= Stella Chou =

Taiwanese journalist and politician

Stella Chou Chou Chuan MLY
- 周荃

Member of the Legislative Yuan
- In office 1 February 1996 – 31 January 1999
- Constituency: Taipei County
- In office 1 February 1990 – 31 January 1996
- Constituency: Taipei 1→Taipei North

Personal details
- Born: 3 July 1956 (age 70) Tainan County, Taiwan
- Party: New Party (1993–1997)
- Other political affiliations: Kuomintang (until 1993)
- Education: Chinese Culture University (BA)

Stella Chou (Chinese: 周荃; born 3 July 1956) is a Taiwanese journalist and politician.

== Career ==
Chou studied journalism at Chinese Culture University and worked as a reporter for several television networks. She stood as a Kuomintang candidate for the 1989 Legislative Yuan elections. During her first term, Chou joined the Legislative Yuan's first all-women caucus. She was reelected in 1992, although she was not formally nominated by the Kuomintang. In August 1993, she became a founding member of the Chinese New Party, alongside Chen Kuei-miao, Jaw Shaw-kong, Lee Ching-hua, Wang Chien-shien, and Yok Mu-ming. Later that year, Chou coordinated New Party campaigns alongside Ju Gau-jeng. Chou contested the 1995 legislative elections, winning a third term. She sought New Party backing for a 1997 bid at the Taipei County magistracy, and left the New Party when it chose to nominate Yang Tai-shun. Supported by Hsieh Chi-ta, Chou ran for the Taipei County magistracy as an independent candidate. In 2002, business executive Su Hui-chen claimed that she bribed a legislative committee four years prior on which Chou was a member.
