= Hsu Li-nung =

Taiwanese military officer, politician and activist (1919–2025)

- 許歷農

Minister of Veterans Affairs Commission of the Republic of China
- In office 18 November 1987 – 26 February 1993
- Preceded by: Chang Kuo-ying
- Succeeded by: Chou Shih-pin

Personal details
- Born: 4 April 1919 Guichi, Chizhou, Anhui, China
- Died: 4 May 2025 (aged 106) Taipei, Taiwan
- Spouses: Wa Jingrong (divorced); Chen Qinghua ()
- Children: 2
- Website: www.facebook.com/lnhsu

Military service
- Allegiance: Republic of China
- Branch: Republic of China Army
- Service years: 1939–1983
- Rank: General (Chinese: Èrjí Shàngjiàng)

Hsu Li-nung (traditional Chinese: 許歷農; simplified Chinese: 许历农; pinyin: Xǔ Lìnóng; 4 April 1919 – 4 May 2025) was a Taiwanese military officer, politician and unification activist.

== Biography ==
=== Early life and military career ===
Hsu's father, Xu Sigong, once served as a civil servant in North China. He died of illness shortly after returning home due to illness in his middle age. Hsu was six years old at the time, so he did not have a deep impression of his father. He had a brother and a sister, and their mother also died when Hsu was 12 years old. School was his home from the time when he was a child. He first attended Anqing No. 1 Middle School and then transferred to several schools before ending up at the United Middle School established in Zhide, Anhui. Tuition and living expenses were paid for by his grandfather Xu Qifen. He joined the army when the Marco Polo Bridge Incident broke out in 1937.

Hsu graduated from the 16th Infantry Course of the Third Branch of the Army Academy. He served as the principal of the Army Academy, Commander of the Kinmen Defense Command, Director of the General Political Warfare Department of the Ministry of National Defense, Commander of the Sixth Army Corps, Chairman of the Executive Yuan Retirement Committee, and Deputy Chairman of the National Unification Committee of the Presidential Office. Equal grade. In 1981, he served as the commander of the National Day parade and in 1982, he was promoted to the second-level general of the Army.

=== Political career ===
Hsu served as the Minister of Veterans Affairs Commission of the Executive Yuan from 1987 to 1993. He once served as a member of the Central Standing Committee of the Kuomintang but quit the party in 1993 due to his opposition to Lee Teng-hui, then President of the Republic of China and Chairman of the Kuomintang. Later, he participated in the founding of the New Party and was expelled from the Kuomintang.

After Lien Chan became the chairman of the Kuomintang, Hsu, Lin Yang-kang and Hau Pei-tsun returned to the party in 2005 and were appointed chairmen of the presidium of the Central Evaluation Committee of the Kuomintang.

Because he co-founded the New Party with Jaw Shaw-kong, Yok Mu-ming, Wang Chien-shien, etc., and was elected as a representative of the third National Congress on behalf of the New Party, he was known as the boss of the New Party and was also known as "Father Hsu". He still had the status of consultant to the New Party.

=== Post-political life ===
Hsu was committed to communicating with the Chinese Communist Party (CCP) and served as the president of the New Alliance to promote unification with the People's Republic of China. In 2005, Hsu stated in an interview with China Central Television that he supported socialism with Chinese characteristics proposed by CCP leader Deng Xiaoping, and so only supported unification after 1979. Since 2007, New Alliance has organized visits to mainland China for retired Taiwanese generals. In 2010, the first Huangpu-Zhongshan Cross-Strait Sentiment Forum was held.

On 19 December 2013, the New Alliance (along with other pro-unification groups such as the New Party, the Association for the Promotion of Peaceful Reunification across the Taiwan Straits, the China Unification Alliance, the Association for the Promotion of Commercial and Industrial Unification, the Chinese Unification Promotion Party, the Workers’ Party, the Chinese National Unity Association, the Republic of China Association for Unity and Self-Strength, and the China Huangpu Sihai The "Joint Meeting of Political Groups Promoting the Peaceful Reunification of the Chinese Nation" composed of 15 groups including the Tongxin Hui, the Loyalty and Righteous Comrades Association of the Republic of China, the Qingtian Association of the Republic of China, the National Democratic Unification Association of China, the New Hongmen Party of China, and the Chinese Patriotic Tongxin Association was held at National Taiwan University) issued a joint declaration to support cross-strait reunification.

On 26 September 2014, Hsu, as the president of the New Alliance and the chairman of the New Party Yu Muming, led the "Taiwan Peaceful Reunification Group Joint Visiting Delegation" to meet with Xi Jinping, the General Secretary of the Chinese Communist Party, at the Great Hall of the People, expressing his hope to see the reunification of China.

== Views ==
On 30 August 2015, Hsu was asked whether he would participate in the Chinese Communist Party's military parade to commemorate the 70th anniversary of the Anti-Japanese War. He responded: "As long as it does not violate the historical truth and methods, I agree to it wherever it can be held." He also explained that he had participated in military parades held in mainland China before. The commemoration of the 60th anniversary of the Anti-Japanese War was because there were no relevant activities in Taiwan at that time, and because "the front battlefield of the Anti-Japanese War was led by the Kuomintang, and the Communist Party fought behind enemy lines", he chose to participate in a series of activities organized by the government of the Republic of China in Taipei.

On 10 November 2016, Hsu went to Beijing to participate in the 7th "Zhongshan·Huangpu·Cross-Strait Sentiment" forum co-sponsored by the Central Committee of the Chinese Kuomintang Revolutionary Committee and the Huangpu Military Academy Alumni Association. He said, "The peaceful reunification of the two sides of the Taiwan Strait will inevitably come naturally. I hope that in our I can see the peaceful reunification of both sides of the Taiwan Strait in my lifetime." Then on 11 November, he and 31 other retired generals of the National Army attended the "150th Anniversary of the Birth of Dr. Sun Yat-sen" held in the Great Hall of the People.

On 2 September 2017, Hsu published an open letter titled "The Truth from a 99-Year-Old Man", explaining the reasons why he no longer opposed the Communist Party in the past 10 years and was still committed to "promoting reunification." The letter pointed out that since Deng Xiaoping promoted "reform and opening up", mainland China has completely abandoned communism and has explored and found an effective plan for governing the country - socialism with Chinese characteristics. The letter lists the actions and achievements of socialism with Chinese characteristics, and believes that the thoughts and actions of mainland China today are fully in line with the principles of normal national development and are also beneficial to both sides of the Taiwan Strait. The reasons for anti-communism in the past have long since ceased to exist. As for "promoting reunification," the letter believes that reunification is the goal consistently pursued by the Constitution of the Republic of China. The slogans of the year such as "Counterattack on the Mainland," "Recover the Mainland's Land," and "Fight for the Survival and Development of the Republic of China" were all pursuit of national reunification. The specific proposition is that "Taiwan independence" is not only inappropriate subjectively (blood relationship, culture), but also objectively (relative situation) impossible.

== Personal life ==
Wang Jingrong, Hsu's first wife when he was in mainland China, and her father, Wang Helin, was Hsu's superior in the army. He was the director of the 25th Army of the National Revolutionary Army at that time. At that time, Wang Helin and Hsu Li-nung's troops were stationed in Peiping, and Wang admired Hsu Li-nung very much. He believed that Hsu "will definitely become a great weapon". When Hsu Li-nung was promoted to battalion commander, Wang Helin took the initiative to marry his daughter Wang Jingrong to Hsu. At that time, Wang Jingrong was only 16 years old and Hsu was 24 years old.

In 1949, when the civil war between the Kuomintang and the Communist Party worsened, Hsu and his wife left Peking with the Nationalist Army. He separated from his wife at the train station and promised to return to his hometown to reunite when the war was over. However, in the end, it backfired. Hsu never saw his first wife again. When Hsu went to Taiwan, his 3-month-old daughter Xu Qiyan was left in mainland China with her mother. Xu Qiyan lived with her maternal grandparents in Wuhan since she was a child. Her maternal grandmother later served as the people's representative of Wuchang. Xu Qiyan was taken home by her mother Wang Jingrong when she was seven years old. In order to make a living, Wang Jingrong remarried a worker named Zhang, and gave birth to a half-brother and sister to Xu Qiyan. They began to work in Wuhan. After the urban population was decentralized, the family moved to Tongshan one after another. Her stepfather named Zhang got a job as a caretaker. Working in a waste workshop, her mother performed odd jobs every day to make ends meet. Father and daughter Hsu Li-nung and Xu Qiyan did not reunite until cross-strait family visits were opened up.

More than ten years after Hsu arrived in Taiwan, he married Chen Qinghua. Chen was from Hubei and worked in life insurance at the Central Trust Bureau. The two had a daughter.

On 30 June 2022, Hsu's first memoir biography was published.

Hsu died at the Taipei Veterans General Hospital on 4 May 2025, at the age of 106.
