= 1994 Taiwanese local elections =

- 3 December 1994
- Provincial election
- Turnout: 76.15%
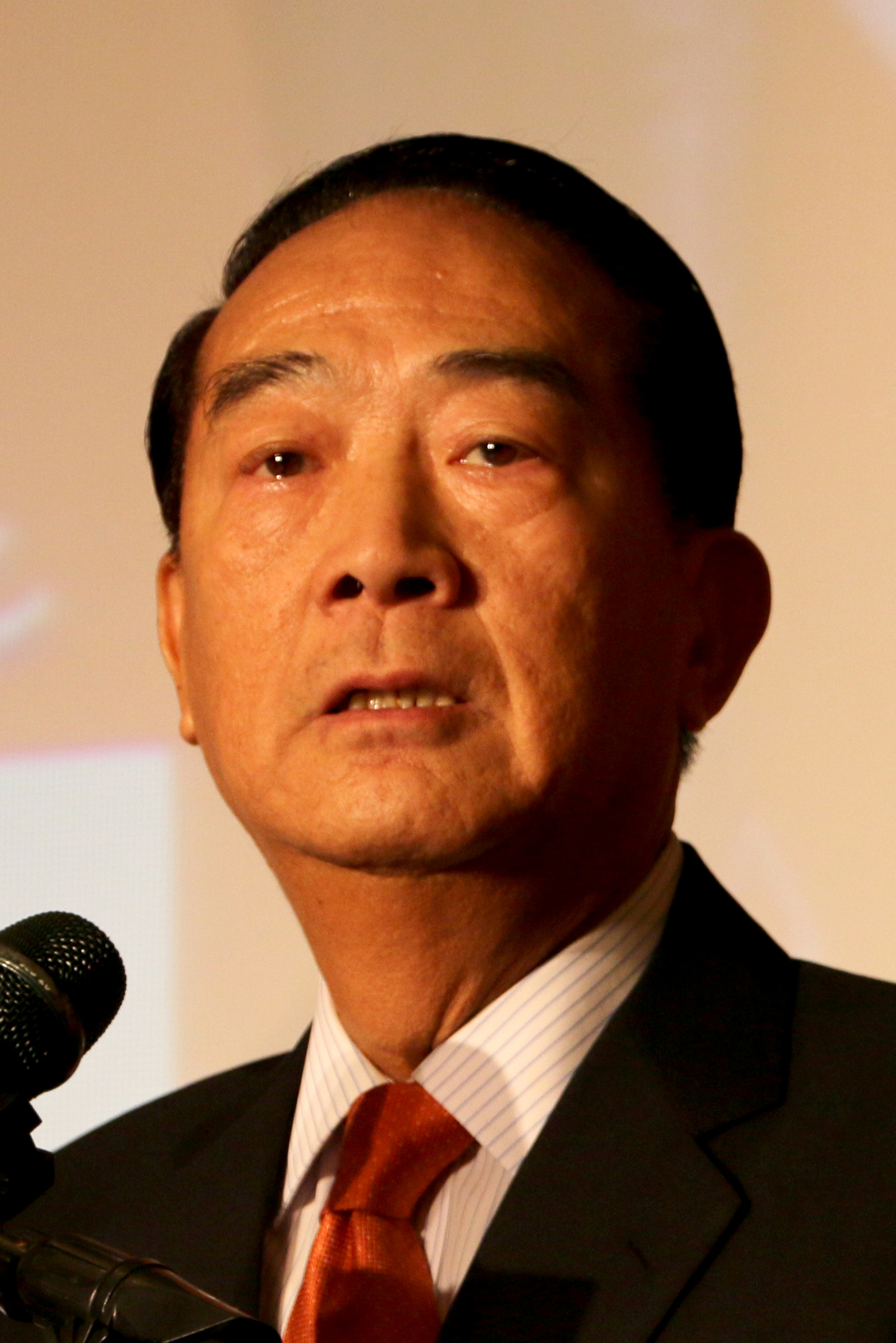

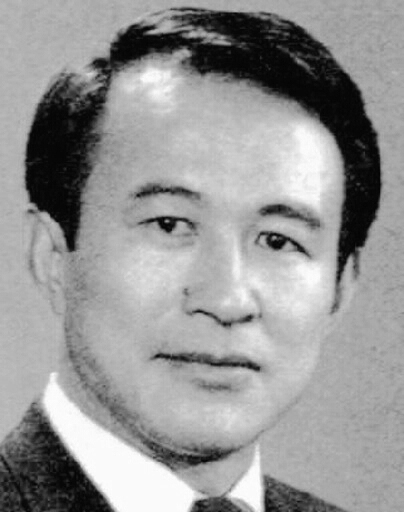
Candidate	James Soong	Chen Ding-nan
Party	KMT	DPP
Popular vote	4,726,012	3,254,887
Percentage	56.22%	38.72%
- Election result in township division James Soong; Chen Ding-nan
- Municipal election

2 mayors of special municipalities
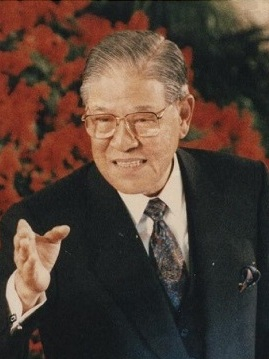

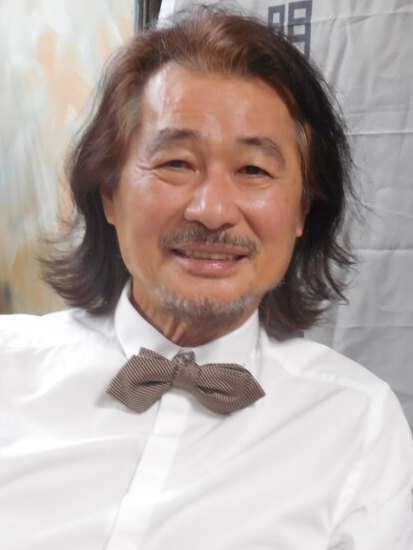
	Majority party	Minority party
Leader	Lee Teng-hui	Shih Ming-teh
Party	KMT	DPP
Mayors	1	1

Provincial and municipal elections were held in Taiwan on 3 December 1994, electing the Governor of Taiwan Province, and mayor of two special municipalities (Taipei and Kaohsiung).

This is the first election for all three posts, and the only one for the governorship of the later-streamlined Taiwan Province.

Kuomintang (KMT) was elected in Taiwan Province and Kaohsiung, while the opposition Democratic Progressive Party (DPP) captured the capital city.

== Taiwan Province ==
Since the retreat of Kuomintang's regime from mainland China to Taiwan, the head of the Taiwan Province was appointed by the central government due to martial law in place.

In 1994, the new Province and County Autonomy Act (Chinese: 省縣自治法) was enacted, the chairmanship of Taiwan Provincial Government was replaced by elected governorship of Taiwan Province.

James Soong of the KMT, then-chairman of Taiwan Provincial Government, was nominated to continue heading the province. The DPP endorsed Chen Ding-nan, member of Legislative Yuan and former Yilan Magistrate.

Soong was elected in a landslide, winning 56% of votes, while the party also secured a majority in the Provincial Council.

Governor of Taiwan Province
Candidate	Party	Votes	%
James Soong	Kuomintang	4,726,012	56.22
Chen Ding-nan	Democratic Progressive Party	3,254,887	38.72
Ju Gau-jeng	New Party	362,377	4.31
蔡正治	Independent	37,256	0.44
吳梓	Independent	25,398	0.30
Total		8,405,930	100.00
Valid votes		8,405,930	98.69
Invalid/blank votes		111,194	1.31
Total votes		8,517,124	100.00
Registered voters/turnout		11,184,258	76.15

Council of Taiwan Province
Party	Votes	%	Seats
Kuomintang	4,223,995	51.03	48
Democratic Progressive Party	2,693,353	32.54	23
New Party	309,648	3.74	2
Independent	1,051,015	12.70	6
Total	8,278,011	100.00	79
Valid votes	8,278,011	97.62	
Invalid/blank votes	202,030	2.38	
Total votes	8,480,041	100.00	
Registered voters/turnout	11,111,460	76.32	

== Taipei City ==
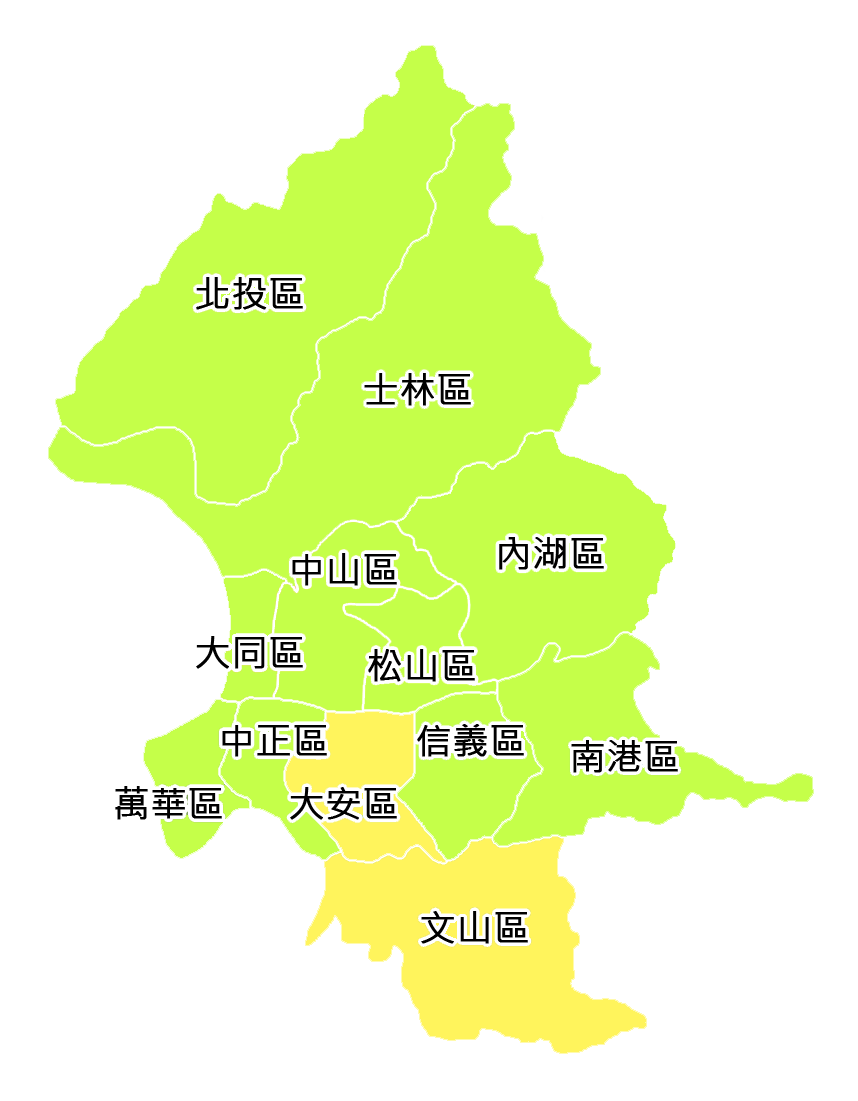
Mayoral result according to districts Won by Chen Shui-bian Won by Jaw Shaw-kong

Taipei City was long seen as the stronghold of Kuomintang as many civil servants and Chinese migrants (or Waishengren) resided there. Between 1951 and 1967, Taipei, then a provincial city, had an elected mayor, and majority were Tangwai locals. After upgraded to a special municipality, Taipei has been headed by government-appointed indigenous mayors.

KMT chose then-mayor Huang Ta-chou for re-election, while the DPP held a party primary for nomination. After legislator Frank Hsieh lost the first round of the primary and subsequently withdrew, Chen Shui-bian was selected to challenge Huang. New Party nominated legislator Jaw Shaw-kong.

Due to vote splitting within the pan-blue coalition between Huang and Jaw, Chen was elected with nearly 44% of votes, ending KMT's 22-year rule in the capital. However, KMT was able to win a plurality in the city council.

Mayor of Taipei City
Candidate	Party	Votes	%
Chen Shui-bian	Democratic Progressive Party	615,090	43.67
Jaw Shaw-kong	New Party	424,905	30.17
Huang Ta-chou	Kuomintang	364,618	25.89
紀榮治	Independent	3,941	0.28
Total		1,408,554	100.00
Valid votes		1,408,554	98.72
Invalid/blank votes		18,298	1.28
Total votes		1,426,852	100.00
Registered voters/turnout		1,816,986	78.53

Council of Taipei City
Party	Votes	%	Seats
Kuomintang	544,670	39.05	20
Democratic Progressive Party	419,505	30.08	18
New Party	302,409	21.68	11
China Loyal Justice Party (中國忠義黨)	66	0.00	0
Independent	128,029	9.18	3
Total	1,394,679	100.00	52
Valid votes	1,394,679	98.02	
Invalid/blank votes	28,241	1.98	
Total votes	1,422,920	100.00	
Registered voters/turnout	1,811,825	78.54	

== Kaohsiung City ==
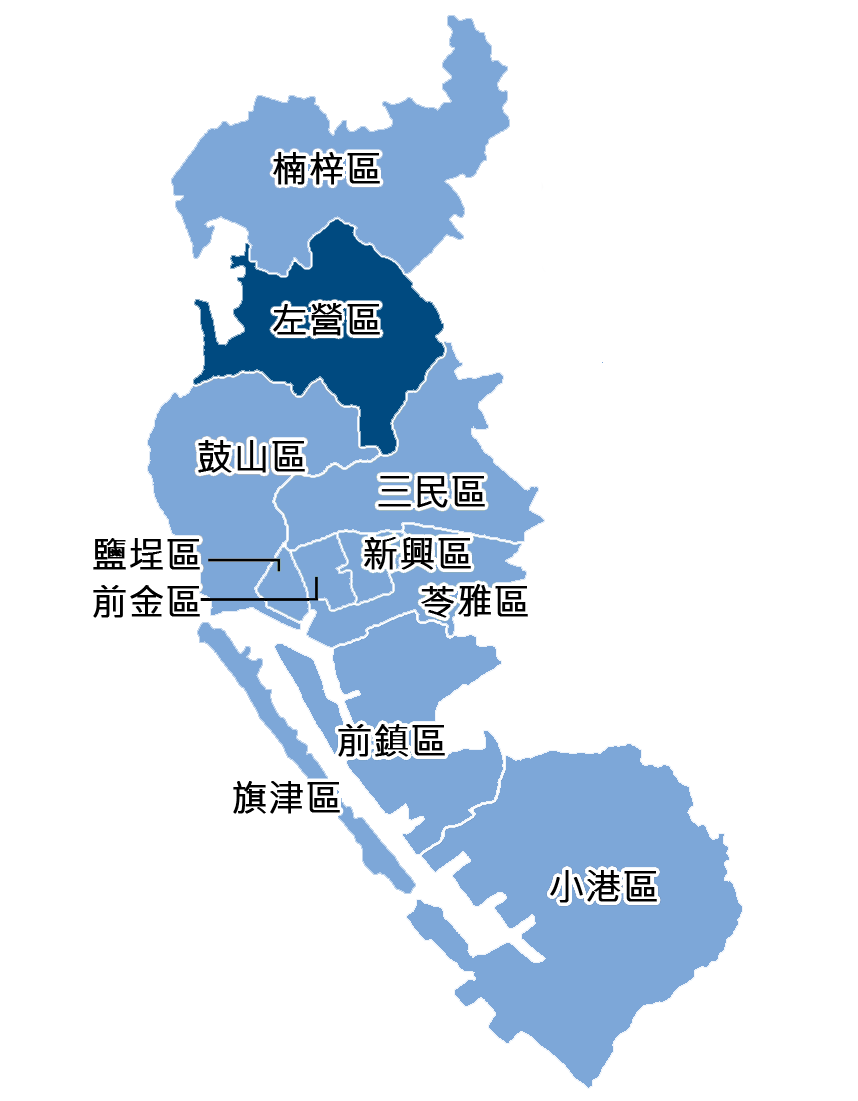
Mayoral result according to districts Won by Wu Den-yih with more than 60% of votes Won by Wu Den-yih with less than 60% of votes

Kaohsiung had long been ruled by the Kuomintang except for a few years. In this election, KMT's candidate Wu Den-yih, former Nantou Magistrate, won 54% of votes and was leading in all districts of Kaohsiung. The KMT also obtained a majority in the council, consolidating the rule.

Mayor of Kaohsiung City
Candidate	Party	Votes	%
Wu Den-yih	Kuomintang	400,766	54.46
Chang Chun-hsiung	Democratic Progressive Party	289,110	39.29
湯阿根	New Party	25,413	3.45
施鐘响	Independent	13,084	1.78
鄭德耀	Independent	7,513	1.02
Total		735,886	100.00
Valid votes		735,886	98.58
Invalid/blank votes		10,583	1.42
Total votes		746,469	100.00
Registered voters/turnout		926,318	80.58

Council of Kaohsiung City
Party	Votes	%	Seats
Kuomintang	337,677	46.28	23
Democratic Progressive Party	181,330	24.85	11
New Party	35,138	4.82	2
Labor Party	1,563	0.21	0
Independent	173,960	23.84	8
Total	729,668	100.00	44
Valid votes	729,668	96.67	
Invalid/blank votes	25,107	3.33	
Total votes	754,775	100.00	
Registered voters/turnout	923,456	81.73	
