= Lee Huan =

Taiwanese politician (1917–2010)

- 李煥
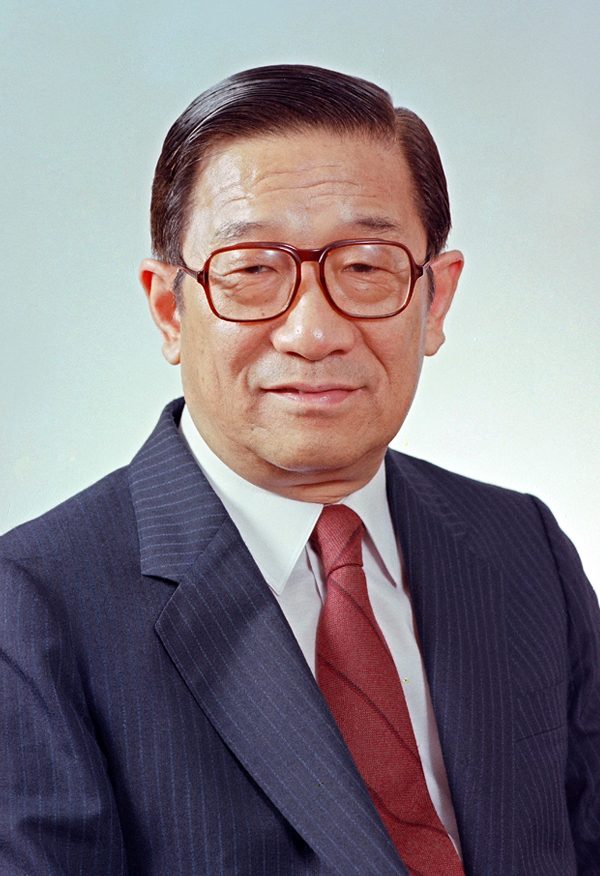

Premier of the Republic of China
- In office 1 June 1989 – 1 June 1990
- President: Lee Teng-hui
- Preceded by: Yu Kuo-hwa
- Succeeded by: Hau Pei-tsun

Personal details
- Born: 8 February 1917 Hankou, Hubei (now Wuhan, Hubei), Republic of China
- Died: 2 December 2010 (aged 93) Taipei, Taiwan
- Party: Kuomintang
- Spouse: Pan Hsing-ning (潘香凝)
- Children: Lee Ching-chung (李慶中); Lee Ching-hua (李慶華); Lee Ching-chu (李慶珠); Diane Lee (李慶安)
- Education: Fudan University (LLB); Columbia University (MA); Dankook University (MA)

Lee Huan (Chinese: 李煥; pinyin: Lǐ Huàn; 8 February 1917 – 2 December 2010) was a Taiwanese politician. He was Premier of the Republic of China from 1989 to 1990, serving for one year under former President Lee Teng-hui. He was the father of Lee Ching-hua and Diane Lee. He was born in Hankou, Hubei.

== Early life and education ==
Lee was born in Hankou, Hubei, on February 8, 1917. He earned a Bachelor of Laws at Fudan University and a Master of Arts in education from Columbia University, where he was a student at Teachers College. He also received a master's degree in administration and social science from Dankook University in South Korea. Lee also received an honorary doctorate from Dongguk University in South Korea.

== Political career ==
In 1972, Lee Huan was appointed as Director General of the Department of Organization for the Kuomintang (KMT) when Chiang Ching-kuo was premier. In 1976, Chiang Ching-kuo instructed Lee Huan to select several dozen young party leaders for the highest level cadre training program at the Institute of Revolutionary Practice. Among the 60 individuals chosen for the training, half were Taiwanese, including Lien Chan, Wu Po-hsiung, Shih Chi-yang. This opening of the KMT's cadre program was an unprecedented opening for native Taiwanese, and was an important step in Chiang Ching-kuo's program of loosening mainlander control of the KMT by integrating native Taiwanese into its leadership.

In 1977, several thousand anti-KMT demonstrators led by Hsu Hsin-liang rallied in the town of Zhongli to protest the use of paper ballots in the upcoming elections, for fear that the KMT would use the ballots to rig the election. When the protesters realized that the KMT had likely carried out the fraud that they had feared, they rioted, ultimately burning down the Zhongli police station. The riot – the first such large-scale protest in Taiwan since 1947 – was subsequently called the Zhongli incident. The Kuomintang believed that Lee Huan's placatory approach to the Tangwai movement had caused the incident and forced him to resign.

After his resignation, he became the president of CTV until 1979. That year he became president of National Sun Yat-sen University. In 1984, he was appointed Minister of Education. In his three years as Education Minister, he abolished restrictions on students' hair length, enabled the establishment of private colleges, established a college of physical education, increased scholarships for graduate students, and established the University Publications Committee.

=== KMT Secretary General ===
Chiang Ching-kuo ascended to the presidency in 1978, and in July 1987, he tapped his old confidante Lee Huan to be the KMT's new Secretary-General. Chiang told Lee that he had three goals he would like Lee to fulfill: reform the KMT, move the ROC towards democracy, and move the ROC towards reunification. In a speech to the KMT's Kaohsiung headquarters in September 1987, Lee declared that the KMT's goal was no longer to replace the communist party ruling mainland China, but rather to "push for democracy, freedom of the press, and an open economy in the mainland so as to rid China of Communism and to move it toward a democratic modern state." Many in the KMT's right-wing claimed the speech betrayed the party's historic commitment to destroy the communists; Chiang countered by instructing Lee to publish the entire speech in the party's official journal. The role Lee played in the lifting of martial law in Taiwan and subsequent reforms to the National Assembly led to assembly members characterizing Lee as one of the Red Guards.

=== Premiership ===
Chiang Ching-kuo died on 13 January 1988 and Vice President Lee Teng-hui immediately stepped in and ascended to the presidency. The "Palace Faction" of the KMT, a group of conservative mainlanders headed by General Hau Pei-tsun, Premier Yu Kuo-hwa, and sought to block President Lee's accession to the KMT chairmanship and sideline him as a figurehead. while Lee Huan supported Lee's appointment as chairman, viewing it as a necessary move to counter Yu's growing influence. With the help of James Soong – himself a member of the Palace Faction – who quieted the hardliners with the famous plea "Each day of delay is a day of disrespect to Ching-kuo," Lee was allowed to ascend to the chairmanship unobstructed. At the KMT party congress of July 1988, Lee named 31 members of the Central Committee, 16 of whom were native Taiwanese: for the first time, the native Taiwanese held a majority in what was then a powerful policy-making body.

Yu Kuo-hwa retired as premier in 1989, and President Lee named Lee Huan to replace him. However, only one year later, Lee was forced out in favor of Hau Pei-tsun, due to strong disagreements between President Lee and Lee Huan.

Despite being forced from office, conservative leaders within the KMT such as Lee Huan, Premier Hau, Judicial Yuan President Lin Yang-kang, and the second son of Chiang Kai-shek, Chiang Wei-kuo, formed a bloc (called the "Non-mainstream faction") to oppose those who followed President Lee (the "Mainstream faction").

Lee died at the Veterans' General Hospital in Taipei on 2 December 2010 at the age of 93.

== Notes ==
Government offices
Preceded by Chu Hui-sen	ROC Minister of Education; 1984–1987	Succeeded by Mao Kao-wen
Preceded by Yu Kuo-hwa	Premier of the ROC; 1989–1990	Succeeded by Hau Pei-tsun
