= Mayor of Taipei =

Head of government of Taipei, Taiwan

Mayor of the City of Taipei
- Emblem of the City of Taipei

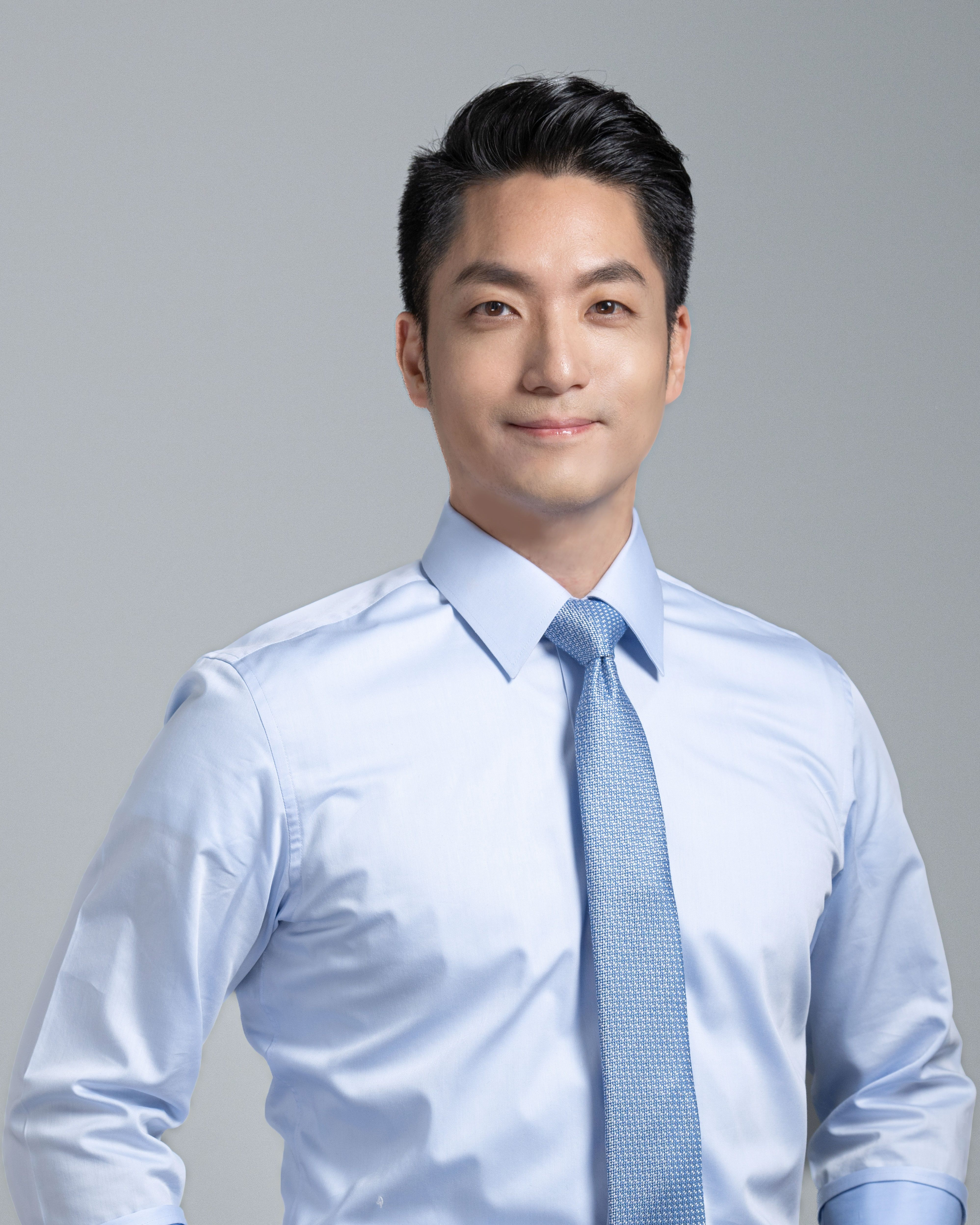
- Incumbent; Chiang Wan-an since 25 December 2022
- Term length: four years; may serve 1 consecutive terms
- Inaugural holder: Mutō Shingorō
- Formation: 1920
- Website: Office of the Mayor

The mayor of Taipei is the head of the Taipei City Government and is elected to a four-year term. Until the election of Tsai Ing-wen, the office was seen as a stepping stone to the presidency: presidents Lee Teng-hui, Chen Shui-bian and Ma Ying-jeou have all held this position prior to being elected president.

Taipei was elevated as a special municipality from 1967. The mayor was a position appointed by the central government from 1967 to 1994, and the first public election for Mayor of Taipei was held in 1994.

The incumbent mayor is Chiang Wan-an, the great-grandson of Chiang Kai-shek.

== Titles of the Mayor ==
Date	English	Characters	Japanese	Mandarin	Taiwanese	Hakka
Oct 1920–Oct 1940	Mayor of Taihoku	臺北市市尹	Taihoku-shi Shiin		Tâi-pak-chhī Chhī-ún	Thòi-pet-sṳ Sṳ-yún
Oct 1940–Oct 1945	Mayor of Taihoku	臺北市市長	Taihoku-shi Shichō		Tâi-pak-chhī Chhī-tiúⁿ	Thòi-pet-sṳ Sṳ-chhòng
Oct 1945–present	Mayor of Taipei	臺北市市長		Táiběi Shì Shìzhǎng	Tâi-pak-chhī Chhī-tiúⁿ	Thòi-pet-sṳ Sṳ-chhòng

== List of Mayors ==
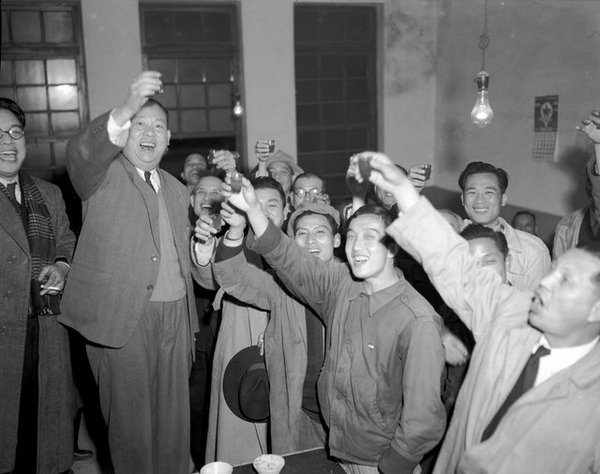
Non-Kuomintang Taiwanese politician Wu San-lien (2L) celebrated his landslide victory (65.5%) in the first-time Taipei city mayoral election in January 1951 with his supporters. Taipei is the capital of the Republic of China (Taiwan) since December 1949.

Kuomintang Independent Democratic Progressive Taiwan People's

=== Prefectural city era (appointed mayors) ===
№	Name	Term of Office	
1	Mutō Shingorō	1 September 1920	23 December 1924
2	Ōta Goichi	23 December 1924	27 July 1927
3	Tabata Kōzaburō	27 July 1927	20 April 1929
4	Masuda Hidekichi	20 April 1929	16 May 1931
5	Utsumi Chuji	16 May 1931	15 March 1932
6	Nishizawa Gichō	15 March 1932	4 August 1933
7	Matsuoka Kazue	4 August 1933	16 October 1936
8	Tatsui Ishi	16 October 1936	27 December 1939
9	Kihara Enji	27 December 1939	14 May 1941
10	Fujimura Kanta	14 May 1941	29 March 1942
11	Hirotani Chiin	29 March 1942	31 March 1944
12	Doi Mimitsu	31 March 1944	31 October 1945

=== Provincial city era (appointed mayors) ===
№	Portrait	Name (Birth–Death)	Term of Office		Political Party
1		Huang Chao-chin 黃朝琴; Huáng Cháoqín (Mandarin); Vòng Chêu-khìm (Hakka) (1897–1972)	1 November 1945	1 March 1946	Kuomintang
2		Yu Mi-chien 游彌堅; Yóu Míjiān (Mandarin); Yù Mì-kiên (Hakka) (1897–1971)	1 March 1946	6 February 1950	Kuomintang
3		Wu San-lien 吳三連; Wú Sānlián (Mandarin); Ǹg Sâm-lièn (Hakka) (1899–1988)	6 February 1950	1 November 1950	Independent
-		Hsiang Chang-chuan 項昌權; Xiàng Chāngquán (Mandarin); Hong Chhông-khièn (Hakka) (1903–2000)	1 November 1950	1 February 1951	Independent

=== Provincial city era (directly elected mayors) ===
№	Portrait	Name (Birth–Death)	Term of Office		Term	Political Party
4		Wu San-lien 吳三連; Wú Sānlián (Mandarin); Ǹg Sâm-lièn (Hakka) (1899–1988)	1 February 1951	2 June 1954	1	Independent
5		Henry Kao; Kao Yu-shu 高玉樹; Gaō Yǜshù (Mandarin); Kô Ngiu̍k-su (Hakka) (1913–2005)	2 June 1954	2 June 1957	2	Independent
6		Huang Chi-jui 黃啟瑞; Huáng Qǐruì (Mandarin); Vòng Khí-sui (Hakka) (1910–1976)	2 June 1957 2 June 1960	2 June 1960 August 1961	3 4	Kuomintang
-		Chou Pai-lien 周百鍊; Zhōu Bǎiliàn (Mandarin); Chû Pak-lien (Hakka) (1909–1991)	August 1961	14 December 1963	4	Kuomintang
6		Huang Chi-jui 黃啟瑞; Huáng Qǐruì (Mandarin); Vòng Khí-sui (Hakka) (1910–1976)	14 December 1963	2 June 1964	4	Kuomintang
7		Henry Kao; Kao Yu-shu 高玉樹; Gāo Yùshù (Mandarin); Kô Ngiu̍k-su (Hakka) (1913–2005)	2 June 1964	30 June 1967	5	Independent

=== Special municipality era (appointed mayors) ===
№	Portrait	Name (Birth–Death)	Term of Office		Political Party
1		Henry Kao; Kao Yu-shu 高玉樹; Gaō Yǜshù (Mandarin); Kô Ngiu̍k-su (Hakka) (1913–2005)	1 July 1967	10 June 1972	Independent
2		Chang Feng-hsu 張豐緒; Zhāng Fēngxù (Mandarin); Chông Fûng-si (Hakka) (1928–2014)	10 June 1972	11 June 1976	Kuomintang
3		Lin Yang-kang 林洋港; Lín Yánggǎng (Mandarin); Lìm Yòng-kóng (Hakka) (1927–2013)	11 June 1976	9 June 1978	Kuomintang
4		Lee Teng-hui 李登輝; Lǐ Dēnghuī (Mandarin); Lí Tên-fî (Hakka) (1923–2020)	9 June 1978	5 December 1981	Kuomintang
5		Shao En-hsin 邵恩新; Shaò Ēnxīn (Mandarin); Seu Ên-sîn (Hakka) (1924–2014)	5 December 1981	19 April 1982	Kuomintang
6		Yang Chin-tsung 楊金欉; Yáng Jīncóng (Mandarin); Yòng Kîm-chhùng (Hakka) (1923–1990)	19 April 1982	30 May 1985	Kuomintang
7		Hsu Shui-teh 許水德; Xǚ Shuǐdé (Mandarin); Hí Súi-tet (Hakka) (1931-2021)	30 May 1985	25 July 1988	Kuomintang
8		Wu Po-hsiung 吳伯雄; Wú Bóxióng (Mandarin); Ǹg Pak-hiùng (Hakka) (1939- )	25 July 1988	2 June 1990	Kuomintang
9		Huang Ta-chou; Thomas Huang 黃大洲; Huáng Dàzhōu (Mandarin); Vòng Thai-chû (Hakka) (1936- )	2 June 1990 15 October 1990	14 October 1990 25 December 1994	Kuomintang

=== Special municipality era (directly elected mayors) ===
№	Portrait	Name (Birth–Death)	Term of Office		Term	Political Party
10		Chen Shui-bian (Note: First Democratic Progressive Party mayor.) (Note: Failed re-election.) 陳水扁; Chén Shuǐbiǎn (Mandarin); Chhṳ̀n Súi-pién (Hakka) (1950–)	25 December 1994	25 December 1998	1	Democratic Progressive Party
11		Ma Ying-jeou 馬英九; Mǎ Yīngjiǔ (Mandarin); Mâ Yîn-kiú (Hakka) (1950–)	25 December 1998 25 December 2002	25 December 2002 25 December 2006	2 3	Kuomintang
12		Hau Lung-pin 郝龍斌; Hǎo Lóngbīn (Mandarin); Khok Liùng-pîn (Hakka) (1952–)	25 December 2006 25 December 2010	25 December 2010 25 December 2014	4 5	Kuomintang
13		Ko Wen-je 柯文哲; Kē Wénzhé (Mandarin); Khóa Vùn-chet (Hakka) (1960–)	25 December 2014 25 December 2018	25 December 2018 25 December 2022	6 7	Independent Taiwan People's Party
14		Chiang Wan-an 蔣萬安; Jiǎng Wàn'ān (Mandarin) (1978–)	25 December 2022	Incumbent	8	Kuomintang

== Electoral history ==
=== Taipei Mayoral Election, 1994 ===
Taipei Mayoral Election, 1994
Party	#	Candidate	Votes	Percentage
Democratic Progressive (DPP)	3	Chen Shui-bian (陳水扁)	615,090	43.67%
New Party	2	Jaw Shaw-kong (趙少康)	424,905	30.17%
Kuomintang (KMT)	4	Huang Ta-chou (黃大洲)	364,618	25.89%
Independent	1	Ji Rong-zhi (紀榮治)	3,941	0.28%
Total			1,408,554	100.00%
Voter turnout			78.53%	

=== Taipei Mayoral Election, 1998 ===
Taipei Mayoral Election, 1998
Party	#	Candidate	Votes	Percentage
Kuomintang (KMT)	2	Ma Ying-jeou (馬英九)	766,377	51.13%
Democratic Progressive (DPP)	1	Chen Shui-bian (陳水扁)	688,072	45.91%
New Party	3	Wang Chien-shien (王建煊)	44,452	2.97%
Total			1,498,901	100.00%
Voter turnout			80.89%	

=== Taipei Mayoral Election, 2002 ===
Taipei Mayoral Election, 2002
Party	#	Candidate	Votes	Percentage
Kuomintang (KMT)	2	Ma Ying-jeou (馬英九)	873,102	64.11%
Democratic Progressive (DPP)	1	Lee Ying-yuan (李應元)	488,811	35.89%
Total			1,361,913	100.00%
Voter turnout			70.61%	

=== Taipei Mayoral Election, 2006 ===
Taipei Mayoral Election, 2006
Party	#	Candidate	Votes	Percentage
Kuomintang (KMT)	5	Hau Lung-pin (郝龍斌)	692,085	53.81%
Democratic Progressive (DPP)	3	Frank Hsieh (謝長廷)	525,869	40.89%
Independent	4	James Soong (宋楚瑜)	53,281	4.14%
Independent	1	Li Ao (李敖)	7,795	0.61%
Independent	6	Ke Tsi-hai (柯賜海)	3,687	0.29%
Taiwan Solidarity Union	2	Clara Chou (周玉蔻)	1,832	0.13%
Total			1,284,549	100.00%
Voter turnout				

=== Taipei Mayoral Election, 2010 ===
Taipei Mayoral Election, 2010
Party	#	Candidate	Votes	Percentage
Kuomintang (KMT)	2	Hau Lung-pin (郝龍斌)	797,865	55.65%
Democratic Progressive (DPP)	5	Su Tseng-chang (蘇貞昌)	628,129	43.81%
Independent	4	Francis Wu (吳武明)	3,672	0.26%
Independent	3	Helen Hsiao (蕭淑華)	2,238	0.16%
Independent	1	Wu Yen-cheng (吳炎成)	1,832	0.13%
Total			1,433,736	100.00%
Voter turnout			70.65%	

=== Taipei Mayoral Election, 2014 ===
Taipei Mayoral Election, 2014
Party	#	Candidate	Votes	Percentage
Independent	7	Ko Wen-je (柯文哲)	853,983	57.16%
Kuomintang (KMT)	6	Sean Lien (連勝文)	609,932	40.82%
Independent	2	Zhao Yan-qing (趙衍慶)	15,898	1.06%
Independent	5	Neil Peng (馮光遠)	8,080	0.54%
Independent	3	Li Hong-xin (李宏信)	2,621	0.18%
Independent	4	Chen Yong-chang (陳永昌)	1,908	0.13%
三等國民公義人權自救黨	1	Chen Ru-bin (陳汝斌)	1,624	0.11%
Total			1,494,046	100.00%
Voter turnout			70.46%	

=== Taipei Mayoral Election, 2018 ===
Taipei Mayoral Election, 2018
Party	#	Candidate	Votes	Percentage
Independent	4	Ko Wen-je (柯文哲)	580,663	41.06%
Kuomintang (KMT)	2	Ting Shou-chung (丁守中)	577,096	40.81%
Democratic Progressive (DPP)	3	Pasuya Yao (姚文智)	244,342	17.28%
Independent	5	Lee Si-kuen (李錫錕)	6,158	0.43%
Independent	1	Wu E-yang (吳蕚洋)	5,611	0.39%
Total			1,413,870	100.00%
Voter turnout			65.33%	

=== Taipei Mayoral Election, 2022 ===
Taipei Mayoral Election, 2022
Party	#	Candidate	Votes	Percentage
Kuomintang (KMT)	6	Chiang Wan-an (蔣萬安)	575,590	42.29%
Democratic Progressive (DPP)	12	Chen Shih-chung (陳時中)	434,558	31.93%
Independent (Note: Supported by the Taiwan People's Party and People First Party)	8	Huang Shan-shan (黃珊珊)	342,141	25.14%
Others			8,662	0.64%
Total			1,360,951	100.00%
Voter turnout			67.70%	

== See also ==
- Taipei
  - Taipei City Government
  - Taipei City Hall
  - Taipei City Council
- Mayor of New Taipei

== Bibliography ==
- Numazaki, Ichiro (1996). "The role of personal networks in the making of Taiwan's guanxiqiye (related enterprises)". In Brown, Rajeswary Ampalavanar (ed.). Chinese Business Enterprise: Critical Perspectives on Business and Management. Vol. 2. London: Routledge. pp. 409–423. ISBN 9780415132398.
