= 1995 Taiwanese legislative election =

- 2 December 1995

All 164 seats to the Legislative Yuan 83 seats needed for a majority
- Turnout: 67.65% ▼4.37pp
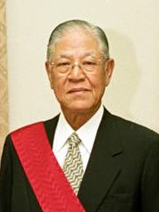

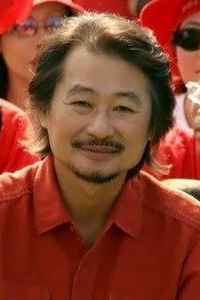

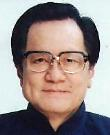
	Majority party	Minority party	Third party
Leader	Lee Teng-hui	Shih Ming-teh	Chen Kuei-miao
Party	KMT	DPP	New
Last election	53.02%, 102 seats	31.03%, 51 seats	–
Seats won	85	54	21
Seat change	▼17	▲3	New
Popular vote	4,349,089	3,132,156	1,222,931
Percentage	46.1%	33.2%	13.0%
Swing	▼6.92pp	▲2.17pp	New

- Elected member party by seat: Kuomintang; Democratic Progressive Party; New Party; Independent
President before election
Liu Sung-pan
KMT
Elected President
Liu Sung-pan
KMT

The 1995 Taiwanese legislative election were held on 2 December 1995. The result was a victory for the Kuomintang, which won 85 of the 164 seats. Voter turnout was 67.6%.

== Results ==
Party	Votes	%	Seats	+/–
Kuomintang	4,349,089	46.06	85	–10
Democratic Progressive Party	3,132,156	33.17	54	+3
New Party	1,222,931	12.95	21	New
Taiwan Indigenous Party	5,707	0.06	0	New
Labor Party	1,207	0.01	0	0
Democratic Non-Partisan Alliance	517	0.01	0	New
Independents	730,529	7.74	4	–10
Total	9,442,136	100.00	164	+3
Valid votes	9,442,136	98.62		
Invalid/blank votes	132,252	1.38		
Total votes	9,574,388	100.00		
Registered voters/turnout	14,153,410	67.65		
Source: Nohlen et al.
