= 1998 Taiwanese legislative election =

- 5 December 1998

All 225 seats in the Legislative Yuan 113 seats needed for a majority
- Turnout: 68.09%
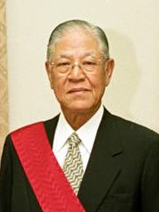

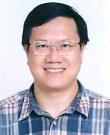
	Majority party	Minority party	Third party
Leader	Lee Teng-hui	Lin Yi-hsiung	Chou Yang-shan
Party	KMT	DPP	New
Last election	46.06%, 85 seats	33.17%, 54 seats	12.95%, 21 seats
Seats won	123	70	11
Seat change	▲38	▲16	▼10
Popular vote	4,659,679	2,966,835	708,465
Percentage	46.43%	29.56%	7.06%
Swing	▲0.33pp	▼3.64pp	▼5.94pp

- Elected member party by seat: Kuomintang; Democratic Progressive Party; New Party; Democratic Union; National Democratic Non-Party Union; Taiwan Independence; New Nation Alliance; Independent
President before election
Liu Sung-pan
KMT
Elected President
Wang Jin-pyng
KMT

Legislative elections were held in Taiwan on 5 December 1998. The result was a victory for the Kuomintang, which won 123 of the 225 seats. Voter turnout was 68%.

== Results ==
Party	Votes	%	Seats	+/–
Kuomintang	4,659,679	46.43	123	+38
Democratic Progressive Party	2,966,834	29.56	70	+16
New Party	708,465	7.06	11	–10
Democratic Union of Taiwan	375,118	3.74	4	New
New Nation Alliance	157,826	1.57	1	New
Taiwan Independence Party	145,118	1.45	1	New
Democratic Non-Partisan Alliance	66,033	0.66	3	+3
Green Party Taiwan	8,089	0.08	0	New
Taiwan Indigenous Party	1,171	0.01	0	0
Chinese Youth Party	723	0.01	0	New
National Democratic Party	342	0.00	0	New
Independents	946,431	9.43	12	+8
Total	10,035,829	100.00	225	+61
Valid votes	10,035,829	98.50		
Invalid/blank votes	152,473	1.50		
Total votes	10,188,302	100.00		
Registered voters/turnout	14,961,900	68.09		
Source: Nohlen et al.
