= Chou Yang-shan =

Taiwanese scientist and politician (born 1957)

Chou Yang-shan MLY
- 周陽山
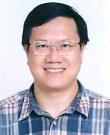

Member of the Control Yuan
- In office 1 August 2008 – 31 July 2014

Member of the National Assembly
- In office 26 May 2005 – 7 June 2005

Convenor of the New Party National Committee
- In office August 1997 – August 1998
- Preceded by: Chen Kuei-miao
- Succeeded by: Chen Kuei-miao

Member of the Legislative Yuan
- In office 1 February 1996 – 31 January 1999
- Constituency: Taipei 1

Personal details
- Born: 24 August 1957 (age 69) Taipei, Taiwan
- Party: New Party
- Education: National Taiwan University (BA); Columbia University (MA, MPhil, PhD)
- Scientific career
- Fields: Political science
- Thesis: Social movements and the party-state in Taiwan: Emerging civil society and the evolving state corporatist structures (1988)

Chou Yang-shan (Chinese: 周陽山; born 24 August 1957) is a Taiwanese political scientist and politician. He was a member of the Legislative Yuan from 1996 to 1999, a member of the National Assembly in 2005, and served on the Control Yuan between 2008 and 2014

== Early life and education ==
Chou was born on August 24, 1957, in Taipei. He graduated from National Taiwan University with a Bachelor of Arts in political science in 1979. He then completed graduate studies in the United States, where he earned a Master of Arts (M.A.) in political science, a Master of Philosophy (M.Phil.), and his Ph.D. in political science with a specialization in comparative politics in 1988, all from Columbia University.

His doctoral dissertation at Columbia was titled, "Social movements and the party-state in Taiwan: Emerging civil society and the evolving state corporatist structures". After receiving his doctorate, Chou worked as a reporter for the China Times and United Daily News, and taught at NTU and National Chengchi University.

== Political career ==
Chou was elected to the Legislative Yuan in 1995 from Taipei 1. He represented the New Party and was the party's caucus convener. After stepping down from the Legislative Yuan, Chou returned to NTU as a political analyst. In this position, he spoke to the media regarding foreign affairs, public opinion, the political nomination process, and constitutional reform. Though it was reported that Chou had accepted a nomination from the People First Party in the legislative elections of 2001, he was not elected to the Legislative Yuan for a second term. Instead, he represented the New Party in a case before the Central Election Commission regarding the joint nomination of Wang Chien-shien. He continued teaching at NTU, and served as an advisor to the Control Yuan.

Chou was elected to the National Assembly in 2005, and attended the legislative body's final meeting prior to its suspension. By 2007, he had joined the faculty of Chinese Culture University, and, backed by the New Party, launched an unsuccessful bid for the Legislative Yuan. Shortly thereafter, Chou was nominated and confirmed for a seat on the Control Yuan. In July 2009, Chou and Ma Yi-kung began investigating the Miaoli County Government's decision to remove kilns in Houlong Township in favor of urban redevelopment. Chou aided other probes regarding infrastructure, public land use, and immigration. In November 2010, Chou motioned to impeach Hu Chen-pu for misusing government funds. In January 2011, Chou disputed Lai Shin-yuan's statement that Taiwanese citizens have free choice with regard to the future because the Constitution of the Republic of China mandates unification with the mainland. That year, Chou participated in reviews exploring the possibility of simultaneous presidential and legislative elections for 2012, the South China Sea territorial disputes, and the average age of Taiwanese diplomats. In August, Chou and Ma Hsiu-ru's report on management practices at the Central News Agency led to the censure of the Government Information Office and Executive Yuan. Three months after the action against the GIO, Chou launched an investigation into Vanessa Shih, Taiwan's representative to Singapore. Upon completing the report in July 2012, Chou advocated for its conclusions to be declassified. Chou's agency eventually decided against his proposal. Though the United Daily News speculated that Chou would resign over this disagreement, he did not do so. Chou ended 2012 by finishing probes into social services for indigenous people and air pollution, while commencing an investigation into the construction of Miramar Resort Village on Shanyuan Bay in Taitung. In April 2013, a report authored by Chou pushed authorities to declassify documents relating to the 228 Incident. Controversially, this report quoted Chi Chia-lin, who stated that Lee Teng-hui was of Japanese descent. That July, a report written by Chou and Ma Hsiu-ru led to the censure of the Ministry of Culture. Chou left the Control Yuan at the end of his six-year term in 2014, and later joined the faculty of National Quemoy University.
