= Ju Gau-jeng =

Taiwanese philosopher, lawyer and politician (1954–2021)

Ju Gau-jeng MLY
- 朱高正

Member of the Legislative Yuan
- In office 1 February 1996 – 31 January 1999
- Constituency: Kaohsiung
- In office 1 February 1990 – 31 January 1996
- Constituency: Taiwan 9th→Yunlin County
- In office 1 February 1987 – 31 January 1990
- Constituency: Taiwan 4th (Yunlin County, Chiayi City, Chiayi County. Tainan City, Tainan County)

Personal details
- Born: 6 October 1954 Yunlin County, Taiwan
- Died: 22 October 2021 (aged 67) Taipei, Taiwan
- Party: Independent (1998–2021)
- Other political affiliations: Democratic Progressive Party (1986–1990); Chinese Social Democratic Party (1991–1993); New Party (1994–1997)
- Education: National Taiwan University (LLB); University of Bonn (PhD)
- Profession: Lawyer

Ju Gau-jeng (Chinese: 朱高正; pinyin: Zhū Gāozhèng; 6 October 1954 – 22 October 2021) was a Taiwanese philosopher and politician who served as a member of the Legislative Yuan from 1987 to 1999. He was known for his combative personality, and helped found two political parties.

== Education ==
Ju graduated from National Taiwan University with a Bachelor of Laws (LL.B.) degree. He then earned a Ph.D. in philosophy from the University of Bonn in Germany. He wrote his doctoral dissertation, Kants Lehre vom Menschenrecht und von den staatsbürgerlichen Grundrechten, in German on the philosophy of Immanuel Kant.

== Political career ==
Ju co-founded the Democratic Progressive Party in 1986, and was responsible for writing the party charter. He was elected to the Legislative Yuan for the first time that year. Shortly after taking office, Ju gained the nickname Rambo for his combative personality, which frequently led to him physically fighting other lawmakers. The first instance of legislative brawling in Taiwan involved Ju, and took place on 7 April 1988, after speaker Liu Kuo-tsai had started counting votes on a budget proposal, which passed. Ju jumped onto the speaker's podium, followed by Jaw Shaw-kong, who was attempting to stop Ju. Throughout the altercation, Liu continued counting votes. Ju ran for election in 1989 without the support of the Democratic Progressive Party, and managed to retain his legislative seat. For mounting an independent campaign, Ju was expelled from the DPP in February 1990 and founded the Chinese Social Democratic Party in 1991. He contested the 1992 legislative elections as a CSDP candidate, which he won. As the only member of his party, Ju chose to caucus with the New Party. By 1993, Ju had again decided to switch affiliations. Though he briefly considered joining the Kuomintang, he was named the New Party candidate for governor of Taiwan Province in August 1994. As a result, Ju consolidated the CSDP with the New Party on 28 December 1994. He lost the gubernatorial election to incumbent James Soong, but subsequently was reelected to parliament as a member of the New Party in 1995. Ju was expelled from the New Party in 1997, and not reelected as an independent candidate in the 1998 legislative election. Ju and Hsu Hsin-liang created the Tangwai round-table forum in February 2003. After his retirement from politics, Ju taught law at Peking University.

Ju died in Taipei on 22 October 2021.
