= Feng Ting-kuo =

Taiwanese politician (1950–2018)

Feng Ting-kuo MLY
- 馮定國
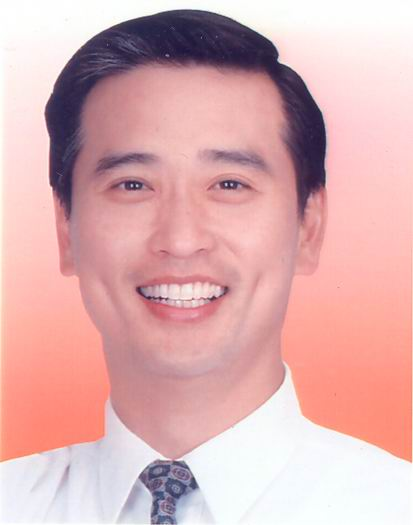

Acting Convenor of the New Party National Committee
- In office December 1998 – January 1999
- Preceded by: Chen Kuei-miao
- Succeeded by: Lee Ching-hua

Member of the Legislative Yuan
- In office 1 February 1996 – 31 January 2008
- Constituency: Taichung County

Member of the National Assembly
- In office 1992–1996

Member of the Taipei City Council
- In office 1985–1988

Personal details
- Born: 24 September 1950
- Died: 5 June 2018 (aged 67)
- Party: People First Party (after 2001); New Party (before 2001)
- Education: Chinese Culture University (LLB); State University of New York (MS); University of Denver (PhD)

Feng Ting-kuo (Chinese: 馮定國; pinyin: Féng Dìngguó; 24 September 1950 – 5 June 2018) was a Taiwanese politician. He served on the Taipei City Council from 1985 to 1988, and was a member of the National Assembly between 1992 and 1996, then represented Taichung County in the Legislative Yuan until 2008.

== Education ==
Feng graduated from Chinese Culture University with a Bachelor of Laws (LL.B.) degree. He then completed graduate studies in the United States, where he earned a Master of Science (M.S.) in computer science from the State University of New York and his Ph.D. in education from the University of Denver in 1994. His doctoral dissertation was titled, "The increase of computer literacy through a computer education series on commercial television in Taiwan, the Republic of China".

== Political career ==
Feng was first elected to the Taipei City Council and later sat on the National Assembly. He was a New Party candidate for Taichung County in the 1995 legislative elections and won. Feng was reelected in 1998, and switched political affiliations to the People First Party in April 2001, eight months before a second successful reelection bid. Feng supported a 2004 proposal for the People First Party to merge with the Kuomintang, though plans fell through. He backed efforts to simplify the process foreign nationals married to native Taiwanese had to go through to obtain a work permit. The People First Party suggested Feng fill a vacancy on the Control Yuan in 2007, but he did not receive an official nomination. Later that year, Feng suspended his legislative campaign in favor of Kuomintang candidate Chiang Lien-fu.

== Misjudgements ==
Feng was charged with bribery in 2008, for accepting a sum of money traced to the National Chinese Herbal Apothecary Association in 1998. The Taipei District Court acquitted Feng in January 2009, but the ruling was overturned by the Taiwan High Court in September 2010, which sentenced Feng to seven years and two months imprisonment. The Taiwan High Court ruled in September 2017 that Feng was not guilty, and his sentence was revoked.

The Taiwan High Court ruled on a separate case involving Feng in 2012, finding him not guilty of breaching the Assembly and Parade Act in a March 2004 protest of presidential election results.

== Death ==
In the early morning of 5 June 2018, Feng died of myocardial infarction at the age of 67.
