= Levi Ying =

Taiwanese politician (1949–2013)

Levi Ying MLY
- 營志宏
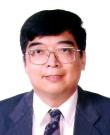

Member of the Legislative Yuan
- In office 1 February 1999 – 31 January 2002
- Constituency: Overseas Chinese

Acting Convenor of the New Party National Committee
- In office December 2001 – January 2002
- Preceded by: Hsieh Chi-ta
- Succeeded by: Yok Mu-ming

Member of the National Assembly
- In office 1997–1998

Personal details
- Born: 1949 Taipei, Taiwan
- Died: 29 April 2013 (age 64) California, United States
- Party: New Party
- Other political affiliations: Kuomintang
- Education: National Taiwan University (BA); National Chengchi University (MA); Whittier Law School (SJD)

Levi Ying (Chinese: 營志宏; 1949 – 29 April 2013) was a Taiwanese politician and legal scholar. He was a member of the National Assembly before serving on the Legislative Yuan from 1999 to 2002. Ying relinquished American citizenship to seek political office in Taiwan, and regained American citizenship before his death in 2013.

== Early life and legal career ==
Ying was born in Taipei, Taiwan in 1949. He received a bachelor's degree in political science from National Taiwan University and earned a master's degree in East Asian studies from National Chengchi University. Ying then moved to the United States, and earned a Doctor of Juridical Science (S.J.D.) from Whittier Law School in California, setting up a law practice there prior to launching a political career in his native Taiwan.

== Political career ==
Ying served in the National Assembly as a member of the Kuomintang. He renounced U.S. citizenship to take up the position. He was elected to the Legislative Yuan in 1998 as a New Party politician, and lost reelection in 2001, as all New Party legislative incumbents failed to retain their legislative seats.

== Later life ==
After Ying's term ended, he moved back to the U.S. on a green card sponsored by his wife, who had remained a U.S. citizen, and he eventually naturalized as a U.S. citizen once again. He died on 29 April 2013, aged 64. His funeral was held at Rose Hills Memorial Park in Whittier, California.
