= Chang Feng-hsu =

Taiwanese politician

- 張豐緒
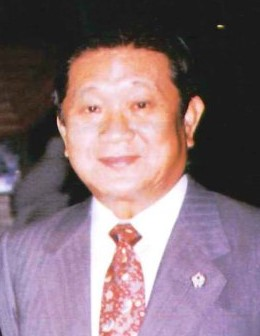

President of the Chinese Taipei Olympic Committee
- In office September 1987 – 19 January 1998
- Preceded by: Cheng Wei-yuan
- Succeeded by: Huang Ta-chou

Minister of the Interior
- In office 11 June 1976 – 1 June 1978
- Preceded by: Lin Chin-sheng
- Succeeded by: Chiu Chuang-huan

2nd Mayor of Taipei
- In office 10 June 1972 – 11 June 1976
- Preceded by: Henry Kao
- Succeeded by: Lin Yang-kang

Pingtung County Magistrate
- In office 2 June 1964 – 1 February 1973
- Preceded by: Lee Shih-chang
- Succeeded by: Ke Wen-fu

Personal details
- Born: 5 August 1928 Mantan, Tōkō, Takao Prefecture, Taiwan, Empire of Japan (today Wandan, Pingtung, Taiwan)
- Died: 1 June 2014 (aged 85) Taipei Veterans General Hospital, Beitou, Taipei, Taiwan
- Party: Kuomintang
- Education: National Taiwan University (BA); University of New Mexico (MA)

Chang Feng-hsu (Chinese: 張豐緒; 5 August 1928 – 1 June 2014) was a Taiwanese politician who served as Mayor of Taipei from 1972 to 1976. He also served as Minister of the Interior and minister without portfolio. From 1987 to 1998, he was chair of the Chinese Taipei Olympic Committee and saw the committee start competing under the name Chinese Taipei.

== Early life ==
Chang Feng-hsu was born in Wandan, Pingtung. He graduated from the National Taiwan University before going to the United States and graduating with a master's degree from the University of New Mexico.

== Career ==
=== Politics ===
Chang served in the Taiwan Provincial Consultative Council for two terms and as the county magistrate of Pingtung County for two terms.

In 1972, Chang replaced Henry Kao as Mayor of Taipei. Governor Carlos Camacho and Chang signed a sister city agreement between Guam and Taipei on 12 January 1973.

Chang served as Minister of the Interior. Chang was a minister without portfolio in Yu Kuo-hwa's cabinet in 1984.

=== Sports ===
Chang was chair of the Chinese Taipei Olympic Committee from 1987 to 1998. He was concurrently president of the Chinese Taipei Sports Federation until stepping down in 1994. In 1991, he was elected as an executive member of the Olympic Council of Asia (OCA). He served as chair of the finance committee of the OCA.

Taiwanese athletes competed for the first time in China since the 1940s after an agreement in 1989. An agreement was reached in 1989 in which Taiwan would compete internationally under the name Chinese Taipei. Taiwan lobbied for the 2002 Asian Games in 1995, but failed and resulted in Kaohisung losing $1 billion of construction sponsorship.

== Death ==
Chang died at the Taipei Veterans General Hospital on 1 June 2014.

== Works cited ==
=== Journals ===
- Winckler, Edwin (1984). "Institutionalization and Participation on Taiwan: From Hard to Soft Authoritarianism?". The China Quarterly. 99 (99). Cambridge University Press: 481–499. JSTOR 653238.
- Yu, Junwei (2008). "China's Foreign Policy in Sport: The Primacy of National Security and Territorial Integrity concerning the Taiwan Question". The China Quarterly. 194 (194). Cambridge University Press: 294–308. JSTOR 20192198.

=== News ===
- "Chance to be running mate turned down". South China Morning Post. 12 November 1995.
- Li, Chien-chung (3 June 2014). 【更新】中華奧會榮譽主席張豐緒 病逝榮總享年87歲 [[Update] Zhang Fengxu, Honorary Chairman of the Chinese Taipei Olympic Committee, passed away at Veterans General Hospital at the age of 87.]. Apple Daily (in Chinese). Archived from the original on 4 March 2016.

=== Newspapers ===
- "Taiwan Cabinet Shift Set by Chiang's Son". Los Angeles Herald Examiner. 30 May 1972. p. A3 – via Newspapers.com.
- "Taiwanese to compete in China". Miami Herald. 8 April 1989. p. 14A – via Newspapers.com.

=== Web ===
- "Industry Report" (PDF). Guam Visitors Bureau. 27 January 2023. Archived (PDF) from the original on 10 July 2026.
- 終身成就獎 張豐緒 [Lifetime Achievement Award Zhang Fengxu] (in Chinese). Ministry of Sports. 7 November 2014.
