= Huang Ta-chou =

Taiwanese sociologist and politician (born 1936)

- 黃大洲
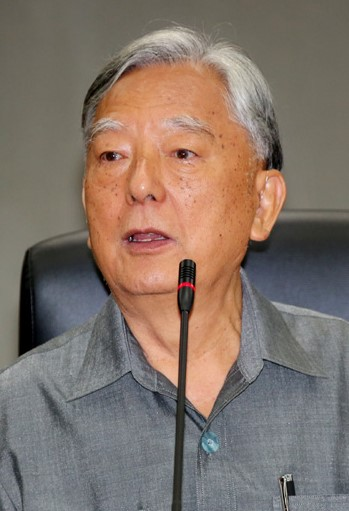
- Huang in 2015

Commissioner of the Chinese Professional Baseball League
- In office 22 July 1998 – 7 March 2002
- Preceded by: Chen Chung-kuang; Yang Tien-fa (acting)
- Succeeded by: Harvey Tung

Chairman of the Chinese Taipei Olympic Committee
- In office January 1998 – January 2006
- Preceded by: Chang Feng-hsu
- Succeeded by: Thomas Tsai

Minister of the Research, Development and Evaluation Commission
- In office June 1996 – September 1997
- Preceded by: Wang Jen-huong
- Succeeded by: Yung Chaur-shin

9th Mayor of Taipei
- In office 2 June 1990 – 25 December 1994
- Preceded by: Wu Po-hsiung
- Succeeded by: Chen Shui-bian

Personal details
- Born: 7 February 1936 (age 90) Shanhua, Tainan, Taiwan, Empire of Japan
- Party: Kuomintang
- Education: National Taiwan University (BS, MS); Cornell University (MS, PhD)
- Profession: Agricultural economist; sociologist

Huang Ta-chou (Chinese: 黃大洲; pinyin: Huáng Dàzhōu; born 7 February 1936), also known as Thomas Huang, is a Taiwanese economist, sociologist, and politician who served as the 9th mayor of Taipei from 1990 and 1994. He chaired the Chinese Taipei Olympic committee from 1998 to 2006. Before entering politics, Huang graduated with two degrees from National Taiwan University and earned a master's degree and a Ph.D. from Cornell University in the United States.

== Early life and education ==
Huang was born in Shanhua, Tainan, in 1936 during the Japanese rule of Taiwan. After high school, he attended National Taiwan University (NTU), where he had Lee Teng-hui as an instructor. He graduated from NTU with a Bachelor of Science (B.S.) in agricultural economics in 1960 and a Master of Science (M.S.) in agricultural economics in 1962.

Huang completed doctoral studies in the United States, earning a second M.S. in rural sociology in 1966 from Cornell University. His master's thesis was titled, "Social differentiation in Taiwanese communities". In 1971, he earned his Ph.D. in rural sociology from Cornell. His doctoral dissertation was titled, "Rural-urban migration in Taiwan". After receiving his doctorate, Huang began teaching at National Taiwan University.

== Political career ==
Huang was admired by Lee Teng-hui, who was helpful throughout Huang's political career. In 1979, Lee then Mayor of Taipei, appointed Huang as the mayoral adviser and the Secretary-General of the Research, Development, and Evaluation Commission, Executive Yuan. Two years later, when Lee became the chief executive of Taiwan Province, Huang followed Lee to the Taiwan Provincial Government and was appointed the Deputy Secretary-General. After returning to National Taiwan University in 1984 as a professor, he was appointed the Secretary-General of Taipei City Government in 1987. He became the acting Mayor of Taipei in May 1990, replacing Wu Poh-hsiung. In October, he was appointed Mayor of Taipei by President Lee Teng-hui. During the final year of Huang's term, under the pressure of democratization, the office of mayor became directly elected. Huang is the last Mayor of Taipei to have served via presidential appointment.

In the 1994 Taipei mayoral election, Huang received a late nomination from the Kuomintang. Though he secured the party's endorsement and support from Lee, Huang did not win the election. The loss could be partly ascribed to the split between the Kuomintang and Chinese New Party within the Pan-Blue Coalition. Although the entire Pan-Blue Coalition gained more votes, Huang only received 25.89% of the voter turnout, allowing Democratic Progressive Party candidate Chen Shui-bian to be elected in a traditional pro-Chinese unification city and Mainlander stronghold.

1994 Taipei City Mayoral Election Result
Party	#	Candidate	Votes	Percentage
Independent	1	Ji Rong-zhi (紀榮治)	3,941	0.28%
New Party	2	Jaw Shaw-kong	424,905	30.17%
Democratic Progressive Party	3	Chen Shui-bian	615,090	43.67%
Kuomintang	4	Huang Ta-chou	364,618	25.89%
Total			1,408,554	100.00%
Voter turnout				

After he lost the mayoral election, Huang was appointed the Minister of the Research, Development, and Evaluation Commission in June 1996, and a Minister without Portfolio in 1997.

He was appointed National Policy Advisor by President Ma Ying-jeou in 2009.

== Sports ==
Huang was elected the President of Chinese Taipei Olympic Committee in 1997, followed by becoming the commissioner of Chinese Professional Baseball League upon invitation in 1998.

== Academics ==
After his session in the Olympic Committee in 2005, he returned to his academic research in agricultural science. He invented a new method of nurturing strawberry. He was a professor of agriculture at Toko University in Taiwan.

Government offices
Preceded by Wu Po-hsiung	Mayor of Taipei; 1990–1994	Succeeded by Chen Shui-bian
