= Yang Shih-kuang =

Taiwanese television presenter

- 楊世光
- Born: 24 October 1976 (age 49); Taipei, Taiwan
- Occupation: Television presenter
- Political party: New Party

Yang Shih-kuang (Chinese: 楊世光; pinyin: Yáng Shìguāng; born 1976) is a Taiwanese television presenter.

Yang was a television host for the EBC Financial News Channel, and later served as the leader of the New Party Youth Corps. On 2 July 2019, Yang was nominated by the New Party as its candidate for the 2020 Taiwan presidential election. Yang ended his presidential campaign on 1 November 2019.
