= Hau Pei-tsun =

Taiwanese politician (1919–2020)

- 郝柏村
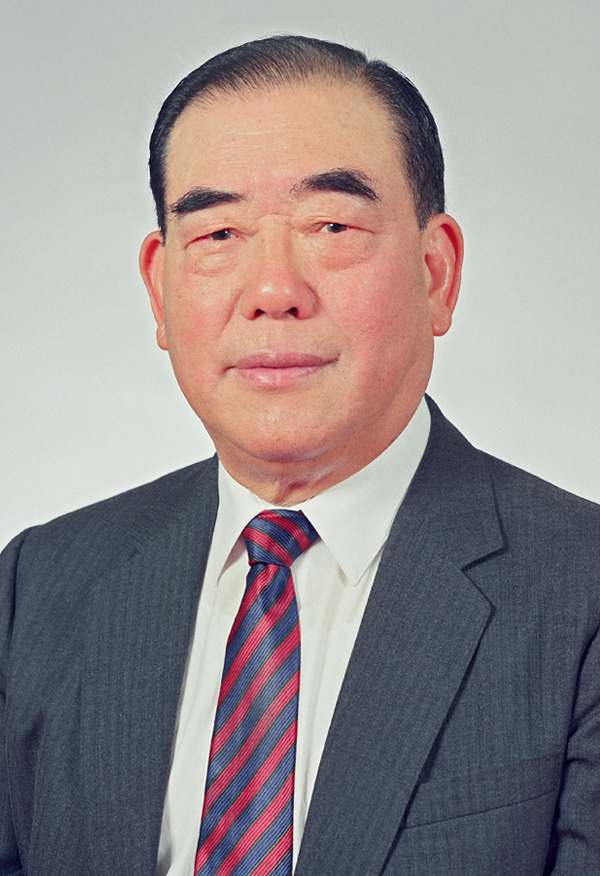
- Official portrait, 1990

13th Premier of the Republic of China
- In office 1 June 1990 – 27 February 1993
- President: Lee Teng-hui
- Vice Premier: Shih Chi-yang
- Preceded by: Lee Huan
- Succeeded by: Lien Chan
Other offices
Minister of National Defense
In office 5 December 1989 – 31 May 1990
Premier	Lee Huan
Deputy	Kuo Tsung-ching
Preceded by	Cheng Wei-yuan
Succeeded by	Chen Li-an
Chief of General Staff of the ROC Armed Forces
In office 1 December 1981 – 4 December 1989
President	Chiang Ching-kuo; Lee Teng-hui
Deputy	Wu Yueh (Air Force); Tsou Chien (Navy); Kuo Ju-lin (Air Force); Chiang Chung-ling (Army)
Preceded by	Soong Chang-chi (Navy)
Succeeded by	Chen Sheng-lin (Air Force)
16th Commander-in-Chief of the ROC Army
In office March 1978 – November 1981
President	Yen Chia-kan; Chiang Ching-kuo
Preceded by	Ma An-lan
Succeeded by	Chiang Chung-ling

Vice Chairman of the Kuomintang
- In office 18 August 1993 – 14 December 1995
- Chairman: Lee Teng-hui
- Preceded by: Position established

Personal details
- Born: 8 August 1919 Yancheng, Jiangsu, Republic of China
- Died: 30 March 2020 (aged 100) Neihu, Taipei, Taiwan (Republic of China)
- Resting place: Wuzhi Mountain Military Cemetery
- Party: Kuomintang (1938–1995, 2005–2020)
- Spouse: Kuo Wan-hua (m. 1950; died 2018)
- Children: 2 sons, including Lung-pin; 3 daughters
- Education: Republic of China Military Academy (BS); United States Army Command and General Staff College

Military service
- Allegiance: Republic of China
- Branch/service: Republic of China Army
- Years of service: 1938–1989
- Rank: Senior General
- Battles/wars: Second Sino-Japanese War; World War II; Chinese Civil War; Second Taiwan Strait Crisis

Chinese name
- Chinese: 郝柏村
Transcriptions
Standard Mandarin
- Hanyu Pinyin: Hǎo Bócūn
- Wade–Giles: hao3 po2 tsʻun1

courtesy name
- Chinese: 伯春
Transcriptions
Standard Mandarin
- Hanyu Pinyin: Bóchūn
- Wade–Giles: po2 chʻun1

Hau Pei-tsun (Chinese: 郝柏村; pinyin: Hǎo Bócūn, 8 August 1919 – 30 March 2020) was a Chinese general and politician who served as the premier of the Republic of China from 1990 to 1993. He was previously the chief of the General Staff of the Republic of China Armed Forces from 1981 to 1989.

On 6 July 2017, Hau attended an academic meeting in Nanjing about the history of the Second Sino-Japanese War, making him the first former ROC premier to visit mainland China since the end of the Chinese Civil War in 1949. He died in March 2020 at age 100.

== Early life and education ==
Hau was born to an upper-class family in Yancheng, Jiangsu, on August 8, 1919. He completed his elementary and high school education in Yancheng. After witnessing the 1931 Mukden incident, Hau decided to enroll in the Republic of China Military Academy, where he graduated in 1938. He then completed advanced studies at the United States Army Command and General Staff College in 1953.

== Career ==
Hau was appointed an artillery officer in 1938, and served in the Chinese expeditionary forces in India during World War II. In the subsequent Chinese Civil War he was a staff officer.

As commander of the 9th Infantry Division from 1958 to 1961, Hau presided over handling the 44-day bombardment of Quemoy by the People's Liberation Army. He commanded the 3rd Corps from 1963 to 1965 and served as Chief Aide to Chiang Kai-shek from 1965 to 1970. He continued his army career as Commander of the 1st Field Army from 1970 to 1973, Deputy Commander-in-Chief of the ROC Army from 1975 to 1977, Executive Vice Chief of the General Staff in the Ministry of National Defense from 1977 to 1978, Commander-in-Chief of the ROC Army 1978 to 1981, and Chief of the General Staff in the Ministry of National Defense from 1981 to 1989. whereas he received the instruction of President Chiang Ching-kuo to investigate the Lieyu Massacre in May 1987.

He was a member of the Central Standing Committee of the Kuomintang from 1984 to 1993 and served as Minister of National Defense from 1989 until 1990 when he was appointed Premier. He was appointed by President Lee Teng-hui in part to mollify the conservative mainlander faction within the KMT that had threatened to run a rival presidential ticket in the March 1990 election. Hau's appointment sparked protests by those who believed it marked retrogression toward military rule, while President Lee defended his decision by saying he valued Hau's tough stance on crime. As premier he held high approval ratings (even higher than Lee's)—he was tough on crime and promoted a multibillion-dollar economic development plan to industrialize Taiwan. Hau submitted his resignation in January 1993 after the KMT's poor showing in the 1992 Legislative Yuan election.

Appointed as one of four vice-chairmen of the KMT in the 14th Party Congress (immediately following the defection of the New Kuomintang Alliance) in another effort by Lee to pacify the mainlander faction, Hau served from 1993 to 1995.

He was expelled from the Kuomintang for his support of New Party candidates in the 1995 legislative elections, and was named Lin Yang-kang's running mate in the 1996 presidential election. Hau rejoined the KMT in 2005.

1996 Republic of China Presidential Election Result
President Candidate	Vice President Candidate	Party	Votes	%
Lee Teng-hui	Lien Chan	Kuomintang	5,813,699	54.0
Peng Ming-min	Frank Hsieh	Democratic Progressive Party	2,274,586	21.1
Lin Yang-kang	Hau Pei-tsun	Independent	1,603,790	14.9
Chen Li-an	Wang Ching-feng	Independent	1,074,044	9.9
Invalid/blank votes			117,160	
Total			10,883,279	100

== Personal life ==
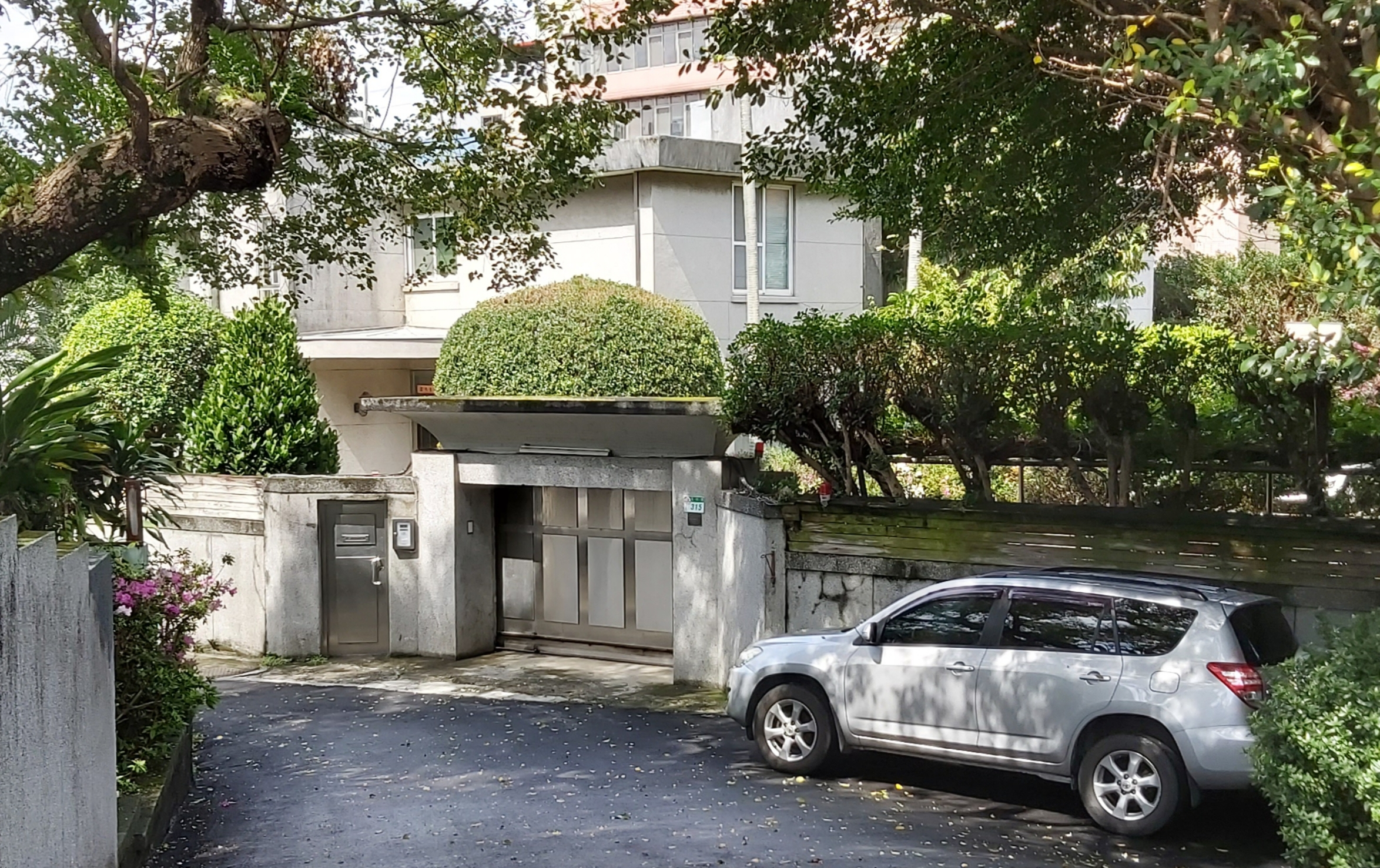
Hau Pei-tsun's residence in Shilin District, Taipei.

He married Kuo Wan-hua and had two sons and three daughters. One of his sons is politician Hau Lung-pin, the former chairman of the New Party, and former Mayor of Taipei. Kuo Wan-hua died on 12 September 2018, aged 96. Hau was baptized as a Christian on 31 December 2017.

Hau Pei-tsun died of multiple organ failure at Tri-Service General Hospital on 30 March 2020, aged 100. He was posthumously awarded a presidential citation.

Government offices
Preceded by Soong Chang-chi	Chief of the General Staff; 1981–1989	Succeeded by Chen Hsing-ling
Preceded by Cheng Wei-yuan	Minister of National Defense; 1989–1990	Succeeded by Chen Li-an
Preceded by Lee Huan	Premier; 1990–1993	Succeeded by Lien Chan
