= Hsieh Chi-ta =

Taiwanese politician (born 1949)

Hsieh Chi-ta MLY
- 謝啟大
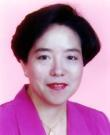

Member of the Legislative Yuan
- In office 1 February 1996 – 31 January 2002
- Constituency: Taichung
- In office 1 February 1993 – 31 January 1996
- Constituency: Hsinchu

Convenor of the New Party National Committee
- In office March 2001 – December 2001
- Preceded by: Hau Lung-pin
- Succeeded by: Levi Ying (acting); Yok Mu-ming

Personal details
- Born: 10 February 1949 (age 77) Shangrao, Jiangxi, Republic of China
- Party: New Party
- Education: National Taiwan University (LLB)

Hsieh Chi-ta (Chinese: 謝啟大; pinyin: Xiè Qǐdà; born 10 February 1949) is a Taiwanese lawyer and former politician who served in the Legislative Yuan from 1993 to 2002.

== Early life and legal career ==
Hsieh was born in Shangrao on 10 February 1949. At the age of eighteen, she became a schoolteacher. Hsieh's legal career began at age 28, after she had focused her legal studies at National Taiwan University on juvenile delinquency. Hsieh was a judge for eleven years prior to her election to the Legislative Yuan, having been appointed to the Yilan and Hsinchu district courts, as well as the Hualien bench of the Taiwan High Court.

Shortly after transferring to Hsinchu's juvenile court in July 1990, Hsieh established a prison education system at the juvenile detention facility, which had been the site of brawls and riots in March 1982 and September 1990. She earned the nickname "Mama Hsieh", and the trust of the prisoners. When another riot occurred at the same location in November 1996, the leaders of the riot asked to meet Hsieh.

== Political career ==
Hsieh represented Hsinchu district in the Legislative Yuan from 1993 to 1996. She served another two terms in the Legislative Yuan, winning the 1995 and 1998 elections as a representative of Taichung. During her first term, Hsieh served on the education committee and worked to improve teaching style and curriculum in public schools. Soon after taking office, Hsieh unsuccessfully intervened in the capital punishment case of Liu Huan-jung, a Bamboo Union gang member who had killed five people and been placed on Taiwan's death row for seven years before his execution. She petitioned for the Judicial Yuan to rule on ROC Civil Code Article 1089, which stated that if parents were to disagree on a decision pertaining to the rights of a child, the father's decision was final. As written, Article 1089 was found to be unconstitutional. In further support of children's rights, Hsieh sought harsher punishments for child prostitution.

In her second term, Hsieh was named a member of the judicial committee. In 1997, Hsieh supported the passage of amendments to the Law Governing the Disposition of Juvenile Cases, making guardians partly responsible for the actions of juvenile delinquents. The next year, she drafted an amendment to the Sexual Violation Prevention Act and Witness Protection Act, subjecting rape allegations to immediate investigation. Hsieh also helped pass an amendment regarding compensation to crime victims. Believing that smaller constituencies would prevent elected officials from accurately reflecting "mainstream public opinion", she opposed a 1998 proposal on electoral district reform. The change from multi-member electoral districts to single-member districts coupled with party-list representation eventually occurred in 2008. Hsieh was a strong advocate for women's rights, and staunchly against the death penalty.

By her third term, Hsieh was routinely listed by TVBS Weekly Magazine, the Vision Information Internet Association, and the Social Lawmaking League as one of the best legislators. Yet, in April 2001 the Taiwan Association of University Professors listed Hsieh one of the thirteen worst legislators. During the 2000 presidential election, she led an investigation of James Soong's finances in support of his candidacy. Hsieh found that the Soong campaign had supported candidates for provincial assemblies, President Lee Teng-hui, set aside funds for a scholarship at the University of California, Berkeley, and the education and business ventures of his son.Shortly after the election, First Lady of the Republic of China Tseng Wen-hui sued Hsieh, Elmer Fung, and Tai Chi for defamation. The three were cleared of charges, but fined upon appeal to the Taiwan High Court. Hsieh refused to pay the fine and was sentenced to three months imprisonment. In her third term, Hsieh opposed the continued operation of the Lungmen Nuclear Power Plant and criticized the Republic of China Navy for excessive spending. She worked to implement a ban on the selling of life insurance to children under fourteen years of age out of concern that parents could be motivated to kill their children and subsequently file claims. By February 2001, Hsieh had become the New Party caucus leader. In June, Hsieh aided a woman who accused Chen Chao-chuan of raping her. She ran again in the December 2001 legislative election, but lost. Following the electoral defeat, Hsieh resigned her position as New Party caucus leader on 8 December 2001. Before she left office, Hsieh played a large part in the 2002 passage of the Gender Equality Employment Law.

Shortly after stepping down from the Legislative Yuan, Hsieh moved to China to teach and run a coffee shop. Upon her return to Taiwan in December 2003, Hsieh served a three-month jail sentence for incidents of defamation that had occurred in 2000 involving Tseng Wen-hui. In 2010, she criticized Ma Ying-jeou's selection of Rai Hau-min as President of the Judicial Yuan. In July 2013, she began working in the Taipei City Government, and resigned from her duties in May 2014.
