= Lee Ching-hua =

Taiwanese historian and politician

- 李慶華
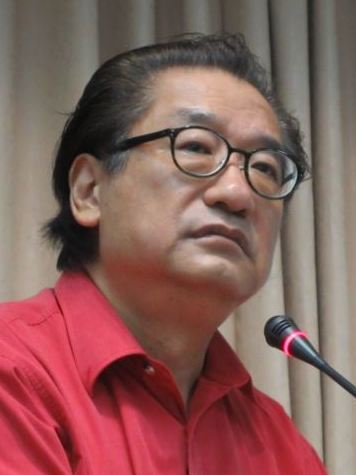

Member of the Legislative Yuan
- In office 1 February 2008 – 31 January 2016
- Succeeded by: Huang Kuo-chang
- Constituency: New Taipei 12
- In office 1 February 1999 – 31 January 2008
- Succeeded by: Yu Tian
- Constituency: Taipei County 3
- In office 1 February 1993 – 31 January 1999
- Constituency: Taipei 2

Convenor of the New Party National Committee
- In office January 1999 – March 2000
- Preceded by: Chen Kuei-miao; Feng Ting-kuo (acting)
- Succeeded by: Hau Lung-pin

Personal details
- Born: 3 December 1948 (age 77) Hangzhou, Republic of China
- Party: Kuomintang (until 1993; since 2005); New Party (1993–2000); People First Party (2000–2005)
- Relations: Diane Lee (sister)
- Parent: Lee Huan (father)
- Education: National Chengchi University (LLB); New York University (PhD)

Lee Ching-hua (Chinese: 李慶華; pinyin: Lǐ Qìnghuá; born 3 December 1948) is a Taiwanese historian, lawyer, and politician.

== Early life and education ==
Lee Ching-hua was born on 3 December 1948, the second child to Lee Huan and Pan Hsiang-ning. He has one older brother, Lee Ching-chung, and two younger sisters: Lee Ching-chu and Diane Lee.

After high school, Lee graduated from National Chengchi University with a Bachelor of Laws (LL.B.). He then completed doctoral studies in the United States, earning his Ph.D. in history from New York University in 1984. His doctoral dissertation was titled, "Teng Hsiao-p'ing's political biography". After receiving his doctorate, Lee returned to Taiwan and became an associate professor at NCCU.

== Political career ==
Lee was elected to the Legislative Yuan for the first time in 1992. He, Chen Kuei-miao, and others broke away from the Kuomintang to found the New Party the next year. He joined James Soong's People First Party in 2000 to support Soong's first presidential bid, but continued serving as the leader of the New Party's national election and development committee during the 2000 election. Lee left the PFP in May 2005 and rejoined the Kuomintang. Lee lost his legislative seat to Huang Kuo-chang of the New Power Party in 2016. The next year, Wu Den-yih named Lee a spokesman for Wu's KMT chairmanship bid.

== Controversy ==
In September 2018, Lee was indicted on charges of corruption by the New Taipei City District Prosecutors’ Office, and accused of embezzling NT$5.23 million, an amount meant to pay for his legislative assistants' salaries.
