= Lee Sheng-feng =

Taiwanese politician

Lee Sheng-feng MLY
- 李勝峰

Member of the Legislative Yuan
- In office 1 February 1990 – 31 January 1993
- Constituency: Tainan County
- In office 1 February 1987 – 31 January 1990
- Constituency: Taiwan 4th (Yunlin County, Chiayi City, Chiayi County, Tainan County, Tainan City)

Personal details
- Born: 10 July 1953 (age 72) Tainan County, Taiwan
- Party: New Party (since 1993); Kuomintang (until 1993)
- Education: Chung Yuan Christian University (BS); National Chengchi University (LLM)

Lee Sheng-feng (Chinese: 李勝峰; born 10 July 1953) is a Taiwanese politician.

== Education ==
Lee graduated with a Bachelor of Science (B.S.) from Chung Yuan Christian University in 1977. He then earned a Master of Laws (LL.M.) from National Chengchi University in 1980.

== Career ==
Lee was first elected to the Legislative Yuan in 1986, as a member of the Kuomintang. During his first year in office, he engaged in debate about the political status of Taiwan, and commented on the end of martial law, stating, "It has made the entire society more lively. The political atmosphere has changed so that there are no taboos. We can talk and think about anything." He was reelected to a second term in 1989. Lee contested the 1993 Taipei County magisterial election as a member of the New Party, and lost the office to You Ching. With the support of the New Party, Lee was co-nominated by the Kuomintang in the elections of 2004, but did not win a legislative seat. He was placed on the New Party list in 2008, but did not win election to the Legislative Yuan via proportional representation.

Within the New Party, Lee has served as secretary-general, and as the national committee adviser.
