= Lin Yang-kang =

Taiwanese politician (1927–2013)

- 林洋港
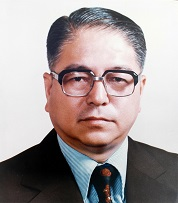
- Official portrait, 1978

6th President of the Judicial Yuan
- In office 17 April 1987 – 1 September 1994
- Appointed by: Chiang Ching-kuo
- Vice President: Wang Dao-yuan; Lu Yu-wen
- Preceded by: Huang Shao-ku
- Succeeded by: Shih Chi-yang

14th Vice Premier of Taiwan
- In office 1 June 1984 – 1 May 1987
- Premier: Yu Kuo-hwa
- Preceded by: Chiu Chuang-huan
- Succeeded by: Lien Chan

15th Minister of the Interior
- In office 25 November 1981 – 1 June 1984
- Premier: Sun Yun-suan
- Preceded by: Chiu Chuang-huan
- Succeeded by: Wu Po-hsiung

10th Chairman of the Taiwan Provincial Government
- In office 12 June 1978 – 5 December 1981
- Premier: Sun Yun-suan
- Preceded by: Hsieh Tung-min
- Succeeded by: Lee Teng-hui

3rd Mayor of Taipei
- In office 11 June 1976 – 9 June 1978
- Preceded by: Chang Feng-hsu
- Succeeded by: Lee Teng-hui

4th Magistrate of Nantou
- In office 1 February 1967 – 16 June 1972
- Preceded by: Yang Chao-pi
- Succeeded by: Ou Shu-wen (acting); Liu Yu-you

Personal details
- Born: 10 June 1927 Gyochi Village, Niitaka District, Taichū Prefecture, Japanese Taiwan (modern-day Yuchi, Nantou, Taiwan)
- Died: 13 April 2013 (aged 85) Taichung, Taiwan
- Party: Kuomintang (until 1995; since 2005)
- Spouse: Chen Ho (陳閤)
- Education: National Taiwan University (BS)

Lin Yang-kang (Chinese: 林洋港; pinyin: Lín Yánggǎng [lǐn jǎŋ.kàŋ]; 10 June 1927 – 13 April 2013) was a Taiwanese politician. He was born at Sun Moon Lake during the Japanese rule of Taiwan. Some thought he might be Chiang Ching-kuo's successor as head of the Kuomintang (KMT), but after failing to win the KMT's nomination for president in 1996, he became an independent. Lin rejoined the party in 2005, and died in 2013.

== Personal life ==
Lin was born in Niitaka District, Taichū Prefecture (modern-day Nantou County), Taiwan, and graduated from National Taiwan University with a Bachelor of Science degree.

Lin was married to Chen Ho (陳閤) and had one son and three daughters. On 13 April 2013, Lin died at home in Taichung, of intestinal obstruction and organ failure, aged 85.

== Political career ==
Lin began his political career in the 1960s. By 1990, he was a vice-chairman of the Kuomintang. Aligned with the "non-mainstream faction" that aimed to be less confrontational with the People's Republic of China than Lee Teng-hui, Lin tried to replace Lee in the 1990 presidential election, with Chiang Wei-kuo as his running mate.

He resigned his position as the head of the Judicial Yuan on 1 September 1994 to become a presidential advisor to Lee Teng-hui. Upon taking the appointment, Lin again declared his candidacy for Taiwan's first direct presidential elections, scheduled for 1996. However, he was not chosen as the Kuomintang nominee. Lin and Chen Li-an resisted calls to join forces and run as the New Party ticket, choosing instead to run separately as independents. After considering Chang Feng-hsu as a running mate, Lin eventually chose former premier Hau Pei-tsun, believing that Hau's background might attract more mainlanders' votes for him. However, Lin's pro-China and pro-reunification views during the Third Taiwan Strait Crisis caused many Taishang to vote against him, and the Lin–Hau ticket finished third with 14.9% of the vote. Chen ran with Wang Ching-feng. Both Chen and Lin were later expelled from the Kuomintang. He retired from political affairs and secluded himself in Taichung after this defeat. Lin resumed membership in the KMT in 2005.

1996 Republic of China Presidential Election Result
President Candidate	Vice President Candidate	Party	Votes	%
Lee Teng-hui	Lien Chan	Kuomintang	5,813,699	54.0
Peng Ming-min	Frank Hsieh	Democratic Progressive Party	2,274,586	21.1
Lin Yang-kang	Hau Pei-tsun	Independent	1,603,790	14.9
Chen Li-an	Wang Ching-feng	Independent	1,074,044	9.9
Invalid/blank votes			117,160	
Total			10,883,279	100
