= New Kuomintang Alliance =

New Kuomintang Alliance Chinese: 新國民黨連線
- Emblem of the Kuomintang
- Registered: 1990; 35 years ago
- Dissolved: 1993
- Split from: Kuomintang
- Succeeded by: Chinese New Party

New Kuomintang Alliance
- Traditional Chinese: 新國民黨連線
- Literal meaning: New Kuomintang Connection
Transcriptions
Standard Mandarin
- Hanyu Pinyin: Xīn Guómíndǎng Liánxiàn
- Wade–Giles: Hsin1 Kuo2-min2-tang3 lien2-hsien4

The New Kuomintang Alliance was a faction of the political party Kuomintang (KMT) in the Republic of China (Taiwan). The faction became formally formed in 1990 after the electoral success of KMT candidates running on an anti-corruption platform in the previous year. the faction was composed of mainly younger and second-generation mainlanders. It was in favor of intraparty reform. It accused President Lee Teng-hui of autocratic tendencies, and complained that the KMT was too corrupt.

In August 1993, days before the 14th National Congress of Kuomintang, the New KMT Alliance broke away to form the Chinese New Party. This move was propelled by the resignation of Premier Hau Pei-tsun, who had been viewed by members of New KMT Alliance members as a counterbalance to Lee's power.

== See also ==
- Politics of the Republic of China
- Revolutionary Committee of the Chinese Kuomintang
