= Yok Mu-ming =

Taiwanese politician and pharmacist

- 郁慕明
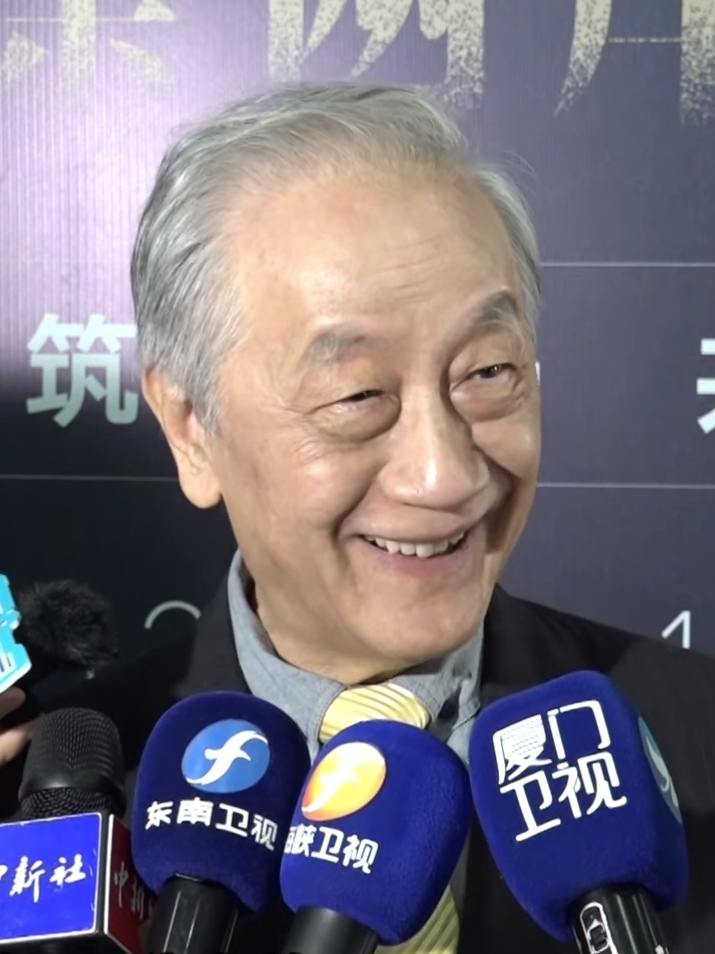
- Yok at the 2021 Straits Forum

Chairperson of the New Party
- In office 1 June 2003 – 21 February 2020
- Preceded by: Himself as convenor of the New Party National Committee
- Succeeded by: Wu Cherng-dean

Convenor of the New Party National Committee
- In office January 2002 – June 2003
- Preceded by: Levi Ying (acting); Hsieh Chi-ta
- Succeeded by: Himself as chairman of the New Party
- In office May 1994 – October 1994
- Preceded by: Jaw Shaw-kong
- Succeeded by: Wang Chien-shien

Member of the Legislative Yuan
- In office 1 February 1996 – 31 January 1999
- Constituency: Taoyuan County
- In office 1 February 1993 – 31 January 1996
- Constituency: Taipei 2
- In office 1 February 1990 – 31 January 1993
- Constituency: Kuomintang party-list

Personal details
- Born: 19 July 1940 (age 86) Shanghai, Japanese-occupied China
- Party: New Party
- Other political affiliations: Kuomintang (until 1993)
- Education: National Defense Medical Center (BS, MS); University of California, San Francisco

Yok Mu-ming (Chinese: 郁慕明; pinyin: Yù Mùmíng; born 19 July 1940) is a Taiwanese pharmacist and politician who was the chairperson of the New Party from 2003 to February 2020.

== Early life and education ==
Yu was born on July 19, 1940, in Shanghai, which was then under the control of the Japanese Wang Jingwei regime. He was a member of a large family of pharmacists; he was the youngest son of a family of 12 sisters and four brothers. His grandfather, Yu Huaizhi, opened a pharmacy in Shanghai in 1903.

In 1948, Yu's family moved to Taiwan and remained there following the Great Retreat. He graduated from the National Defense Medical Center with a Bachelor of Science (B.S.) in pharmacy in 1963, then earned a Master of Science (M.S.) in morphology from the university in 1969. From 1971 to 1973, Yu studied anatomy in the United States at the University of California, San Francisco Medical Center.

== Cross-strait relations ==
=== 2005 mainland China visit ===
Yok and delegates from the New Party made an 8-day visit to mainland China in July 2005 to commemorate the 60th anniversary of China's victory in the Second Sino-Japanese War. The delegates visited Beijing, Dalian, Guangzhou and Nanjing in a tour called "Journey of the Chinese Nation".

In Guangzhou, Yok and his delegates paid tribute at the Huanghuagang Mausoleum of 72 Martyrs honoring the deceased during the Second Guangzhou Uprising to overthrow the Qing dynasty and establish the Republic of China.

=== 2010 mainland China visit ===
In May 2010, Yok visited the National Museum of China in Beijing in which he met with the museum director Lu Zhangshen. Lu briefed Yok about the current situation of the museum renovation. He also expressed hope for future collaboration between the museum and Taiwan, as well as strengthening ties with various cultural organizations in Taiwan.

=== 2012 Tiaoyutai Islands dispute ===
In 2012, responding to the Senkaku Islands dispute between Taiwan, mainland China and Japan, Yok published a written statement saying that trilateral negotiation between the three sides cannot be realized at the current time, Taiwan should hold a dialogue with Mainland China so that the two sides could jointly discuss issues related to defending the islands.

=== 2014 mainland China visit ===
During his visit to China in end of September 2014 to meet with the President of the People's Republic of China and General Secretary of the Chinese Communist Party (CCP) Xi Jinping, Yok attended Xi's speech on peaceful unification and one country, two systems in resolving Taiwan issues and how Beijing would not tolerate a Taiwan independence movement. The statement marked the first time Xi Jinping spoke of one country, two systems as a reunification model for Taiwan before Taiwanese politicians since he became General Secretary of the CCP on 15 November 2012.

=== 2016 mainland China visit ===
Yok attended the 150th anniversary of the birthday of Sun Yat-sen event in Beijing in November 2016 led by General Secretary Xi Jinping.

== See also ==
- United front in Taiwan

Party political offices
| New office | Chairman of the New Party; 2003–2020 | Succeeded by Wu Cherng-dean |
