= Jaw Shaw-kong =

Taiwanese media personality and politician (born 1950)

- 趙少康
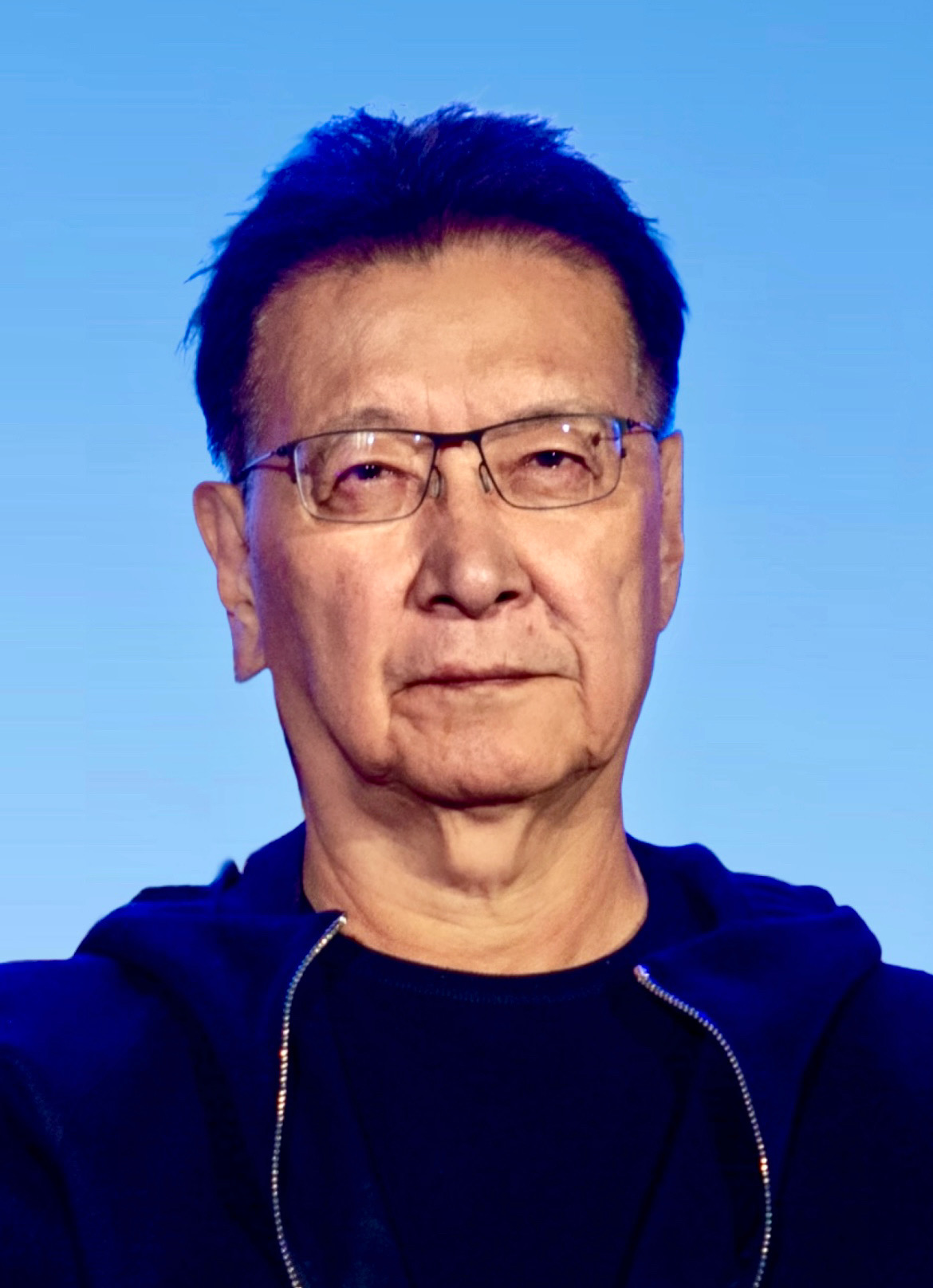
- Jaw in 2023

Member of the Legislative Yuan
- In office 1 February 1993 – 6 December 1994
- Constituency: Taipei County
- In office 1 February 1987 – 31 May 1991
- Constituency: Taipei 1

Convenor of the New Party National Committee
- In office 10 August 1993 – 2 May 1994
- Preceded by: Position established
- Succeeded by: Yok Mu-ming

Minister of the Environmental Protection Administration
- In office 1 June 1991 – 15 November 1992
- Premier: Hau Pei-tsun
- Preceded by: Eugene Chien
- Succeeded by: Larry Chen (acting)

Member of the Taipei City Council
- In office 25 December 1982 – 31 January 1986
- Constituency: 2nd district

Personal details
- Born: 6 May 1950 (age 76) Keelung, Taiwan
- Party: Kuomintang (1968–1994, 2021–present); New Party (1993–2002)
- Spouse: Liang Lei
- Education: National Taiwan University (BS); Clemson University (MS)
- Occupation: Politician; television presenter; radio personality; media entrepreneur; political pundit

Chinese name
- Traditional Chinese: 趙少康
- Simplified Chinese: 赵少康
Transcriptions
Standard Mandarin
- Hanyu Pinyin: Zhào Shàokāng
- Bopomofo: ㄓㄠˋ ㄕㄠˋ ㄎㄤ
- Gwoyeu Romatzyh: Jaw Shawkang
- Wade–Giles: Chao^{4} Shao^{4}-k'ang^{1}
- Tongyong Pinyin: Jhào Shàokang
- IPA: [ʈʂâʊ ʂâʊ.kʰáŋ]

Jaw Shaw-kong (Chinese: 趙少康; pinyin: Zhào Shàokāng; born 6 May 1950) is a Taiwanese politician, media personality and entrepreneur.

Jaw served a single term on the Taipei City Council before being elected to the Legislative Yuan from 1987 to 1991 and 1993 to 1994. In 1993, he co-founded the pro-unification New Party, which he briefly led until 1994. Between Legislative Yuan stints, Jaw led the Environmental Protection Administration. He was the vice presidential candidate of the Kuomintang (KMT) in the 2024 Taiwanese presidential election.

== Early life and education ==
Jaw was born in Keelung, Taiwan, in 1950. His father was a National Revolutionary Army soldier born in She County, Henan, China, who graduated from the Republic of China Military Academy and served in the Second Sino-Japanese War and Chinese Civil War, after which he relocated to Taiwan during the Great Retreat. His mother, Li Lian-chen (李蓮貞), was the director of a kindergarten in Luodong, Yilan County. He attended his mother's kindergarten for three years before completing the first two years of his primary education in Yilan. He then moved to Tainan with his mother.

In Tainan, Jaw attended Jincheng Junior High School, where his classmates included future Democratic Progressive Party politician Chiou I-jen. He then enrolled at National Tainan First Senior High School, but transferred to National Taichung First Senior High School because of his mother's job transfer. After high school, he graduated from National Taiwan University with a bachelor's degree in agricultural engineering in 1972. As an undergraduate, he initially studied water resources before switching to agricultural machinery. He also became a member of the Jue Min Society (覺民學會), a student organization associated with the KMT.

In 1975, Jaw earned a Master of Science in mechanical engineering from Clemson University in the United States. During his graduate studies, he worked as a research assistant in Clemson University's mechanical engineering department. While in the United States, he was also involved in the Republic of China Anti-Communist Patriotic League, an organization opposed to both communism and Taiwanese independence. After receiving his master's degree, Jaw began teaching at National Taiwan University, where he was a lecturer from 1976 to 1981.

== Taipei City Council (1982–1986) ==
Jaw was elected to a seat on the Taipei City Council on 14 November 1981. He served as a councilor representing the Kuomintang (KMT). His constituency was Taipei's second electoral district, which encompassed the Songshan, Neihu, and Nangang districts. In his first election, Jaw received the second-highest number of votes in the constituency, finishing behind independent candidate Chen Shui-bian, who was also elected to the council.

As a councilor, Jaw served as chairman of the Environmental Quality Protection Foundation, established in March 1984 to provide scholarships for students interested in environmental issues. He also began a parallel career in television, becoming the host of the political discussion program News Pursuit (新聞追擊) on Chinese Television System (CTS) in April 1985. He succeeded journalist Li Tao as host after having previously appeared on the program as a guest three times. His first episode as host, broadcast on 7 April 1985, examined whether heavier penalties were effective in discouraging traffic violations, with invited experts and audience members participating in the discussion. Subsequent episodes addressed public controversies involving road access, preferential privileges, and nuclear power.

Jaw won reelection to the Taipei City Council in the election held on 16 November 1985, retaining his seat in the second electoral district. He received the highest number of votes among candidates in his constituency, improving on his second-place finish in 1981.

== Legislative Yuan ==
=== First tenure (1987–1991) ===
Jaw was elected to the Legislative Yuan as a KMT candidate in the legislative election held on 6 December 1986, representing Taipei. He took office in February 1987 as a member of the first Legislative Yuan's supplementary membership. During his legislative career, Jaw became known for his outspoken debating style and was nicknamed the KMT's "political golden boy" (政治金童).

In August 1989, Jaw joined fellow KMT politicians Lee Sheng-feng and Yok Mu-ming in initiating the New Kuomintang Movement, which called for political and party reforms. The movement subsequently developed into the New Kuomintang Alliance, a reformist faction associated with Jaw, Yok Mu-ming, and Wang Chien-shien. He was reelected to the Legislative Yuan in the election held on 2 December 1989, representing Taipei's first electoral district, which encompassed Shilin, Beitou, Datong, Songshan, Neihu, and Nangang.

=== Second tenure (1993–1994) ===
In October 1992, Jaw announced his intention to resign from the Environmental Protection Administration and contest the upcoming legislative election in Taipei County. After the KMT refused to endorse his candidacy, he contested the election as an independent and won a seat with 235,847 votes on 19 December 1992. His vote total was the highest among elected candidates in the constituency. Jaw took office on 1 February 1993 as a member of the second Legislative Yuan.

During his second tenure, Jaw continued his involvement in the New Kuomintang Alliance, whose disagreements with the KMT leadership intensified during the early 1990s. On 10 August 1993, Jaw and other members of the Alliance broke away from the KMT to establish the New Party, with Jaw becoming the inaugural convener of its national committee. He presented the New Party as an alternative to both the KMT and the Democratic Progressive Party (DPP), criticizing the political establishment and advocating greater electoral competition.

In May 1994, the New Party announced that Jaw would be its candidate in the forthcoming 1994 Taipei mayoral election. On 29 November, he resigned from the Legislative Yuan to concentrate on the mayoral campaign. He subsequently lost the election to DPP candidate Chen Shui-bian, ending his tenure in the legislature.

== Environmental minister (1991–1992) ==
In May 1991, Jaw was appointed head of the Environmental Protection Administration (EPA) in the cabinet of Premier Hau Pei-tsun, becoming the agency's second administrator at the age of 41. He served from 1 June 1991 until 15 November 1992, succeeding Eugene Chien. Before his appointment, Jaw had advocated environmental protection as a legislator, including organizing a petition campaign calling for the restoration of the polluted Tamsui River.

During Jaw's tenure, the EPA introduced programs to strengthen industrial water-pollution control. It also issued environmental impact assessment review guidelines for development projects within designated water-source protection areas. His administration was also part a campaign titled "Plant 20 Million Trees to Save Taiwan's Water Sources", organized in cooperation with the China Times group, the Council of Agriculture, the Ministry of Education, and forestry authorities. The campaign was announced at an EPA press conference on 22 February 1992 and began the following March. Participating organizations collected more than NT$17.84 million in donations by the end of 1992 to support tree planting and watershed conservation.

Jaw's management style at the EPA attracted attention as his demands for efficiency and performance at the agency placed considerable pressure on EPA employees. Some officials criticized his demanding leadership style, while some environmental advocates praised his willingness to challenge development projects and enforce pollution controls. On 30 October 1992, Jaw announced his intention to resign from the EPA to contest the upcoming 1992 legislative election in Taipei County. Premier Hau initially sought to retain him, but accepted his renewed resignation on 4 November. His tenure at the EPA ended on 15 November 1992, after which deputy administrator Chen Lung-chi became acting minister.

== Senior political career ==
Jaw later became a member of the New Kuomintang Alliance and the Breakfast Club, set up in opposition to party chairman Lee Teng-hui. In August 1993, he and other members of the New Kuomintang Alliance split from the Kuomintang and co-founded the pro-unification New Party.

In 1994, Jaw resigned his legislative seat to contest to the Taipei City mayoralty on behalf of the New Party, but lost to Democratic Progressive Party (DPP) candidate Chen Shui-bian. Although the pan-Blue forces gained the majority of the votes overall, the vote was split between Jaw and Kuomintang candidate Huang Ta-chou, granting Chen victory in the election.

1994 Taipei City mayoral election result
Party	#	Candidate	Votes	Percentage
Independent	1	Ji Rong-zhi (紀榮治)	3,941	0.28%
New Party	2	Jaw Shaw-kong	424,905	30.17%
Democratic Progressive Party	3	Chen Shui-bian	615,090	43.67%
Kuomintang	4	Huang Ta-chou	364,618	25.89%
Total			1,408,554	100.00%
Voter turnout				

== Media career ==
Jaw announced his intention to retire from politics in July 1996. Soon after announcing his withdrawal from politics in 1996, Jaw founded UFO Radio. He also owned News98 and served as its president. In 2006, Jaw acquired the Broadcasting Corporation of China. He has also hosted his own radio and television programs.

In 2004, Jaw was invited to debate the referendum on cross-strait relations. He was named an adviser to Kuomintang candidates during the 2010 election cycle. In 2017, Jaw reiterated that he was an independent.

== Return to politics ==
Jaw announced his interest about returning to politics in February 2021, disclosing that he had met with Han Kuo-yu in September 2020, who told Jaw that he should return to the Kuomintang and run for the party leadership. The restoration of Jaw's party membership was announced on 3 February 2021, and he subsequently expressed interest in contesting the 2021 party leadership election, as well as the primary for the 2024 presidential election cycle. Jaw stated on 28 April 2021 that he was no longer considering a run for the Kuomintang chairmanship.

On 24 November 2023, the Kuomintang named Jaw its vice presidential candidate for the 2024 presidential election.

== Political positions ==
Jaw is a staunch supporter of unification with China, albeit not under the People's Republic of China, and believes unification is not possible under the current circumstances. He opposes Taiwanese independence, saying there would be no war across the Taiwan Strait as long as Taiwan did not formally declare independence. He believes the current focus of cross-strait relations should be peaceful development, and that it was for the next generation in both sides to see which political system "would bring the greatest happiness to the people."

== Personal life ==
Jaw is fluent in Taiwanese Hokkien. He is married to Liang Lei. Jaw's younger brother Chao Shao-wei has served as president of the Taipei Artist Agency Association. Jaw and I-Mei Foods CEO Louis Ko were classmates in university and have remained friends despite disagreements on issues such as importing pork from the United States.
