= Chen Kuei-miao =

Taiwanese politician

- 陳癸淼
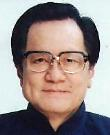

Member of the Legislative Yuan
- In office 1 February 1996 – 31 January 1999
- Constituency: Republic of China (New Party party list)
- In office 1 February 1993 – 31 January 1996
- Constituency: Penghu County
- In office 1 February 1990 – 31 January 1993
- Constituency: Taiwan 16th (Penghu County)

Convenor of the New Party National Committee
- In office August 1998 – December 1998
- Preceded by: Chou Yang-shan
- Succeeded by: Feng Ting-kuo (acting); Lee Ching-hua
- In office August 1995 – August 1996
- Preceded by: Wang Chien-shien
- Succeeded by: Chou Yang-shan

Mayor of Tainan (acting)
- In office 30 May 1985 – 20 December 1985
- Preceded by: Su Nan-cheng
- Succeeded by: Lin Wen-hsiung

Director of the National Museum of History
- In office February 1986 – February 1990
- Preceded by: Lee Ting-yuan
- Succeeded by: Chen Kang-shun

Personal details
- Born: 1 July 1934 Kosei, Makō, Hōko, Taiwan, Empire of Japan
- Died: 15 August 2014 (aged 80) Beitou, Taipei, Taiwan
- Party: New Party; Kuomintang (until 1993)
- Education: National Taiwan Normal University (BA)

Chen Kuei-miao (Chinese: 陳癸淼; pinyin: Chén Guǐmiǎo; 1 July 1934 – 15 August 2014) was a Taiwanese politician.

== Early life and education ==
Chen was born in Taiwan on 1 July 1934 during Japanese rule. In 1958, he graduated from National Taiwan Normal University with a Bachelor of Arts (B.A.) in Chinese literature.

== Political career ==
While serving as acting Mayor of Tainan in 1985, Chen was affiliated with the Kuomintang. He was first elected to the Legislative Yuan in 1989, and represented Taiwan's 16th district, encompassing Penghu County. He was reelected to the Penghu County legislative seat in 1992, and in the midst of his second term, cofounded the New Party, in 1993. Chen was reelected to a third legislative term in 1995, via the New Party proportional representation party list. Chen was one of many legislators to be implicated in a wide-ranging insider trading scandal that also affected Andrew Oung, among others.

Chen Kuei-miao and other politicians broke away from the ruling Kuomintang in opposition to the rule of then KMT chairman and President of Taiwan, Lee Teng-hui.

== Death ==
Chen died at Cheng Hsin General Hospital in Taipei, Taiwan, on 15 August 2014, at the age of 80. He had suffered from kidney and liver disease.
