= Wang Chien-shien =

Taiwanese politician

- 王建煊
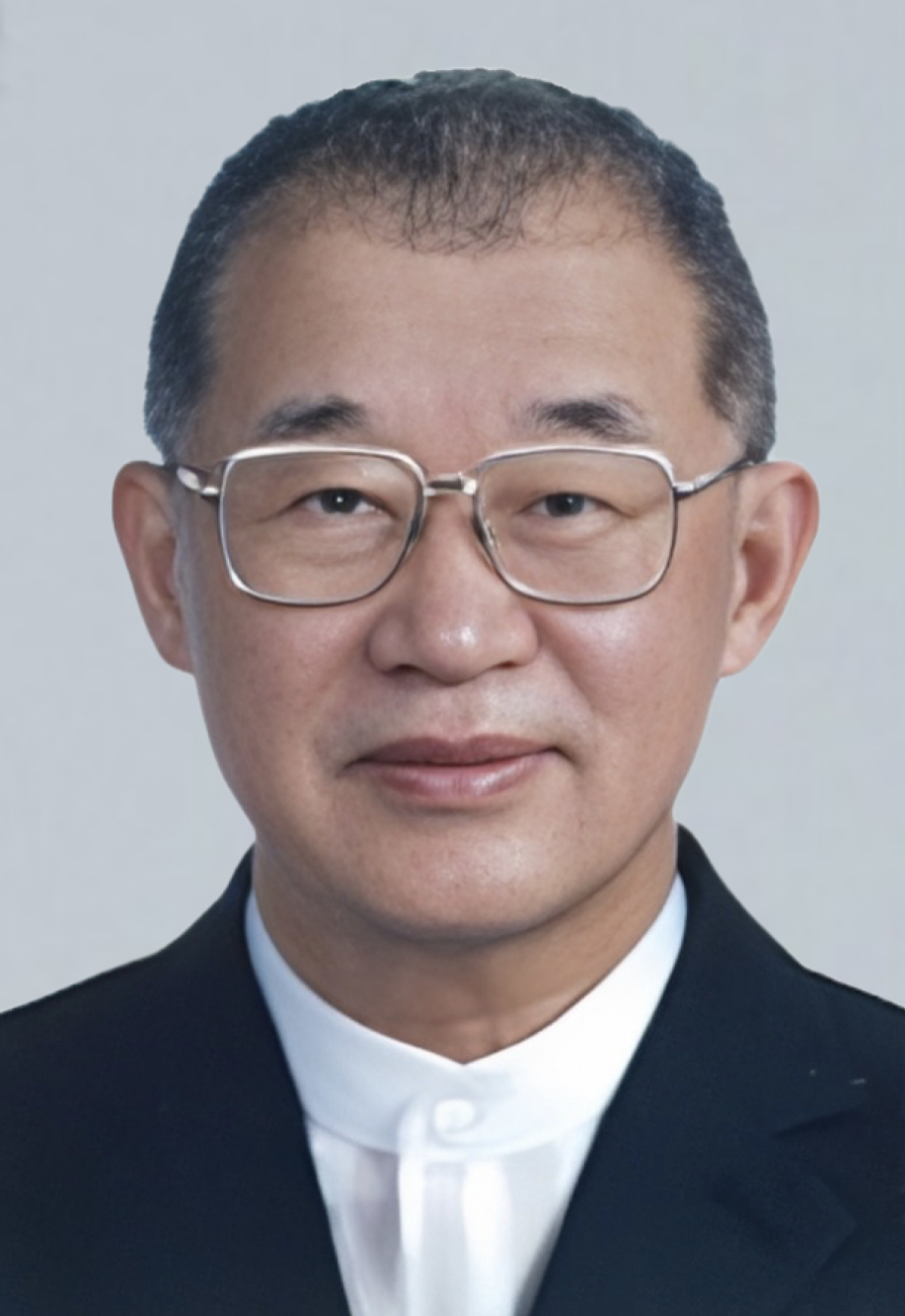

President of the Control Yuan
- In office 1 August 2008 – 31 July 2014
- President: Ma Ying-jeou
- Vice: Chen Jinn-lih
- Preceded by: Vacant (2005–2008); Fredrick Chien
- Succeeded by: Chang Po-ya

Convenor of the New Party National Committee
- In office October 1994 – August 1995
- Preceded by: Yok Mu-ming
- Succeeded by: Chen Kuei-miao

Member of the Legislative Yuan
- In office 1 February 1993 – 31 January 1996
- Constituency: Taipei 1

Minister of Finance of the Republic of China
- In office 1 June 1990 – 23 October 1992
- Premier: Hau Pei-tsun
- Preceded by: Shirley Kuo
- Succeeded by: Bai Pei-ying

Personal details
- Born: 7 August 1938 (age 87) Hefei, Anhui, Republic of China
- Party: New Party
- Education: National Cheng Kung University (BS, MS)

Wang Chien-shien (Chinese: 王建煊; pinyin: Wáng Jiànxuān; born 7 August 1938) is a Taiwanese politician who is the founder of the New Party. He was finance minister of the Republic of China from 1990 to 1992 and is the chairman of the Chinese Management Association (CMA) (since 1990). Wang was the President of the Control Yuan from August 2008 to August 2014.

== Early life and education ==
Wang was born in Hefei, Anhui, in China on 7 August 1938. He grew up in Taipei and earned a Bachelor of Science (B.S.) in accounting and statistics from National Cheng Kung University in 1961 and a master's degree from the university in 1965.

== Political career ==
Wang was popular in the 1990s for his clean reputation and, in 1993, split with the Kuomintang to help found the New Party. He and Jaw Shaw-kong won the most votes in the 1992 Taiwanese legislative election. In 1998, Wang joined the election for the Mayor of Taipei under New Party. However, he lost to Ma Ying-jeou of the Kuomintang.

In 2001, the three parties of the pan-Blue coalition, the Kuomintang, the People First Party, and the New Party agreed to field only one candidate for Taipei County magistrate in 2001. Wang led Lin Chih-chia in a poll, and was selected for the unified ticket, then lost the election to Su Tseng-chang.

In July 2008 Wang was nominated by President Ma and approved by the Legislative Yuan to become the President of the Control Yuan. Wang left office on July 31, 2014.

On March 8, 2023, Wang announced his candidacy for the 2024 presidential election as an independent, pledging cross-strait reunification by 2025.

== Personal life ==
Wang is married to Su Fa-jau (蘇法昭), and is a Christian. After he lost the 2001 election, Wang expanded the work of his educational and cultural foundation by setting up elementary schools in China.

Government offices
Preceded by Fredrick Chien (2005); Vacant (2005–2008)	President of Control Yuan; 2008–2014	Succeeded by Chang Po-ya
