= New Party (Taiwan) =

New Party 新黨
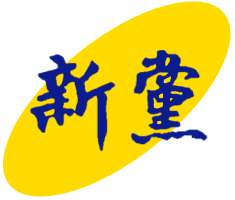
- Chairman: Wu Cherng-dean
- Vice Chairman: Lee Sheng-feng
- Founder: Jaw Shaw-kong, Yok Mu-ming et al.
- Founded: August 22, 1993
- Split from: Kuomintang
- Headquarters: Taipei
- Membership (2020): at least 500
- Ideology: Three Principles of the People Conservatism (Taiwanese); Chinese unification
- Political position: Right-wing to far-right
- National affiliation: Pan-Blue Coalition; Pro-Beijing camp
- Legislative Yuan: 0 / 113
- Municipal mayors: 0 / 6
- Magistrates/mayors: 0 / 16
- Councilors: 1 / 912
- Township/city mayors: 0 / 204

Party flag

Website
- www.np.org.tw

New Party
- Traditional Chinese: 新黨
- Simplified Chinese: 新党
Transcriptions
Standard Mandarin
- Hanyu Pinyin: Xīn Dǎng
Hakka
- Pha̍k-fa-sṳ: Sîn Tóng
Southern Min
- Hokkien POJ: Sin Tóng

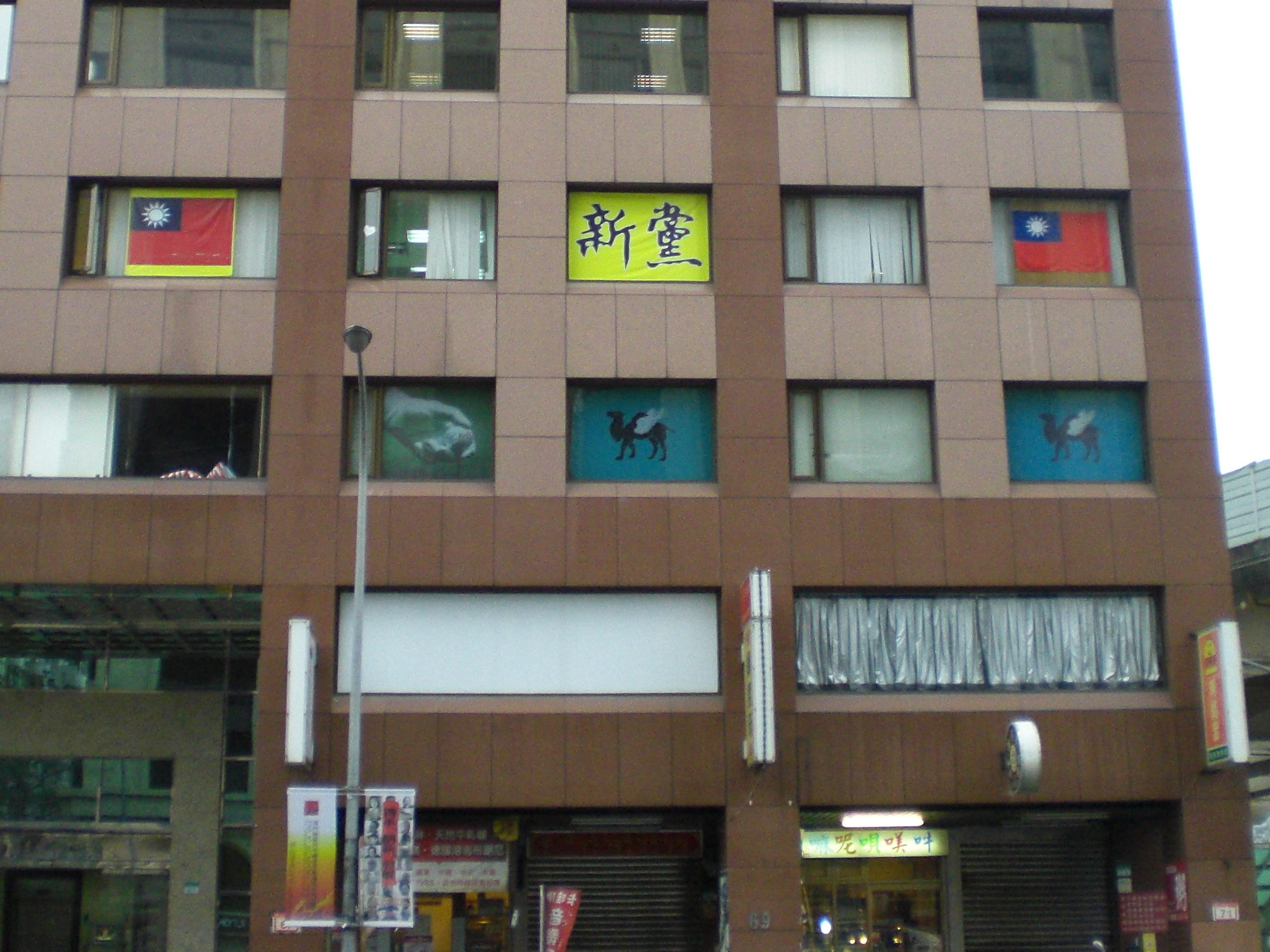
New Party Headquarters

The New Party (NP; Chinese: 新黨; pinyin: Xīn Dǎng; Hakka: Sîn Tóng), formerly the Chinese New Party (CNP), is a Chinese nationalist political party in the Republic of China (Taiwan).

The New Party was established in 1993 due to a split from the Kuomintang by members of the New Kuomintang Alliance, who were dissatisfied with Kuomintang Chairman Lee Teng-hui. In the 2000 presidential elections, the party symbolically nominated Li Ao as its candidate, but both Li and the party encouraged party members to support former Kuomintang member James Soong. It won one seat in the 2001 legislative elections, and saw significant support in the 2005–06 municipal elections, though its influence has waned since then.

The New Party is considered to be on the right-wing or the far-right of the political spectrum. It strongly supports unification with China under the "one country, two systems" formula and opposes Taiwan independence. The New Party's "one country, two systems" plan proposes to establish a unified Chinese nation between the People's Republic of China and the Republic of China. The Party's proposal also includes that after reunification, Taiwan would reduce the size of its military, stop purchasing U.S. equipment, and criminalize Taiwan independence.

== History ==
The New Party was formed on 22 August 1993 out of a split from the then-ruling Kuomintang (KMT) by members of the New Kuomintang Alliance. Members of the Alliance had accused KMT Chairman Lee Teng-hui of autocratic tendencies and moving the party away from Chinese unification. Co-founders of the New Party included Chen Kuei-miao. Originally, the party wanted to keep the name of the faction, but was prevented from doing so due to the similarity of names. The name "New Party" was seemingly inspired by the contemporary electoral success of the Japan New Party.

At this time, the party favored direct presidential elections, the ideals of Sun Yat-sen, voluntary service instead of military service, and "equal protection of human rights." The party also called for direct flights between Taiwan and the mainland, speaking of a "Great Chinese Common Market."

In the mid-1990s, the New Party attracted support from the KMT old guard as well as young urban professionals. The New Party was aided by former Finance Minister Wang Chien-shien and former Environmental Protection Administration Director Jaw Shaw-kong, who had charismatic and clean images.

In January 1997, the Chosun Ilbo, a conservative South Korean newspaper, reported that the New Party, along with the Patriot Alliance Association, was a "far-right" and "anti-Korean"; the report stated that they had torn up the South Korean national flag in protest against the South Korean government and pro-environmental South Korean demonstrators who opposed the Lee Teng-hui administration's attempt to transfer Taiwan's nuclear waste to North Korea's territory through negotiations with the North Korean government.

In 1997, the New Party launched a fierce political campaign against the introduction of the new junior high school textbook series, Knowing Taiwan (認識臺灣). Led by figures such as lawmaker Lee Ching-hua, the party strongly opposed the curriculum reform, criticizing it as a "pro-Japanese" distortion of history that attempted to erase Chinese nationalist identity and subtly promote Taiwanese independence. The New Party argued that the textbook minimized the shared heritage of the Chinese nation and romanticized the era of Japanese colonial rule, positioning themselves as vocal defenders of traditional Chinese-centric history education in Taiwan. They also strongly opposed the Taiwanization policy of the Lee Teng-hui government and some politicians in Kuomintang.

In the 2000 presidential election, the party nominated writer and dissident Li Ao, who ran a spirited but token campaign. In the election, most members of the party supported former provincial governor James Soong, who ran as an independent candidate after losing the KMT nomination and subsequently being expelled from the KMT, and in fact both Li Ao and the New Party leader Lee Ching-hua encouraged people to support him. In the 2001 Legislative Yuan election, the party won a single seat, Wu Cherng-dean's, in Kinmen.

In the 2005–06 municipal elections, the New Party made significant gains, seating over a dozen members into public office. The New Party also gained four seats in the Taipei Mayor's private offices.

Since the 2008 Legislative Yuan elections, the New Party has not won any seats, while the party supported most of the KMT candidates.

== Ideology and policies ==
The New Party considered to be a right-wing or far-right political party. It strongly opposes Taiwan independence and supports Chinese unification. Since 1997, the NP has switched to the Chinese ultranationalist position, also considered pro-Beijing.

In August 2019, New Party Chairman Yok Mu-ming announced a proposal to unify China under the "one country, two systems" principle. Under the party's plan, the People's Republic of China and the Republic of China would be united as one country, and the country's name and flag would be determined by common consultations; Yok suggested "China" as the common name. The proposal includes post-unification goals such as maintaining a multi-party political system, a legal ban on the Taiwan independence movement, reducing the size of Taiwan's armed forces, inclusion of Taiwanese representatives in China's delegation to the United Nations, and integration of Taiwanese business in the Belt and Road Initiative.

== Election results ==
=== Presidential elections ===
Election	Candidate	Running mate	Total votes	Share of votes	Outcome
2000	Li Ao	Elmer Fung	16,782	0.13%	Lost ✗
2020	Yang Shih-kuang	Withdrew			

=== Legislative elections ===
Election	Total seats won	Total votes	Share of votes	Outcome of election	Election leader
1995	21 / 164	1,222,931	13.0%	▲21 seats; Opposition	Chen Kuei-miao
1998	11 / 225	708,465	7.1%	▼10 seats; Opposition	Chou Yang-shan
2001	1 / 225	269,620	2.9%	▼8 seats; Majority Opposition (Pan-Blue)	Yok Mu-ming
2004	1 / 225	12,137	0.13%	; Majority Opposition (Pan-Blue)	Yok Mu-ming
2008	0 / 113	386,660	3.95%	▼1 seats; No seats	Yok Mu-ming
2012	0 / 113	10,678	0.08%	; No seats	Yok Mu-ming
2016	0 / 113	510,074	4.18%	; No seats	Yok Mu-ming
2020	0 / 113	147,303	1.04%	; No seats	Yok Mu-ming
2024	0 / 113	40,429	0.29%	; No seats	Wu Cherng-dean

=== Local elections ===
Election	Mayors & Magistrates	Councils	Third-level Municipal heads	Third-level Municipal councils	Fourth-level Village heads	Election Leader
1994 province-level only	0 / 3	15 / 175	—N/a	—N/a	—N/a	Wang Chien-shien
1997-1998	0 / 23	10 / 886	0 / 319	—N/a	—N/a	Chou Yang-shan
1998 municipalities only	0 / 2	10 / 96	—N/a	—N/a	—N/a	Chen Kuei-miao
2001	1 / 23	3 / 897	0 / 319	—N/a	—N/a	Hsieh Chi-ta, Levi Ying
2002 municipalities only	0 / 2	5 / 96	—N/a	—N/a	—N/a	Yok Mu-ming
2005	1 / 23	2 / 901	0 / 319	—N/a	—N/a	Yok Mu-ming
2006 municipalities only	0 / 2	4 / 96	—N/a	—N/a	—N/a	Yok Mu-ming
2009	0 / 17	0 / 587	0 / 211	—N/a	—N/a	Yok Mu-ming
2010 municipalities only	0 / 5	3 / 314	—N/a	—N/a	0 / 3,757	Yok Mu-ming
2014 unified	0 / 22	2 / 906	0 / 204	0 / 2,137	0 / 7,836	Yok Mu-ming
2018 unified	0 / 22	2 / 912	0 / 204	0 / 2,148	0 / 7,744	Yok Mu-ming
2022 unified	0 / 22	1 / 910	0 / 204	0 / 2,139	0 / 7,748	Wu Cherng-dean

=== National Assembly elections ===
Election	Total seats won	Total votes	Share of votes	Outcome of election	Election leader
1996	46 / 334	1,417,209	13.6%	▲46 seats; Opposition	Chen Kuei-miao
2005	3 / 300	34,253	0.88%	▼43 seats; Opposition (Rejecting amendments)	Yok Mu-ming

== Leaders ==
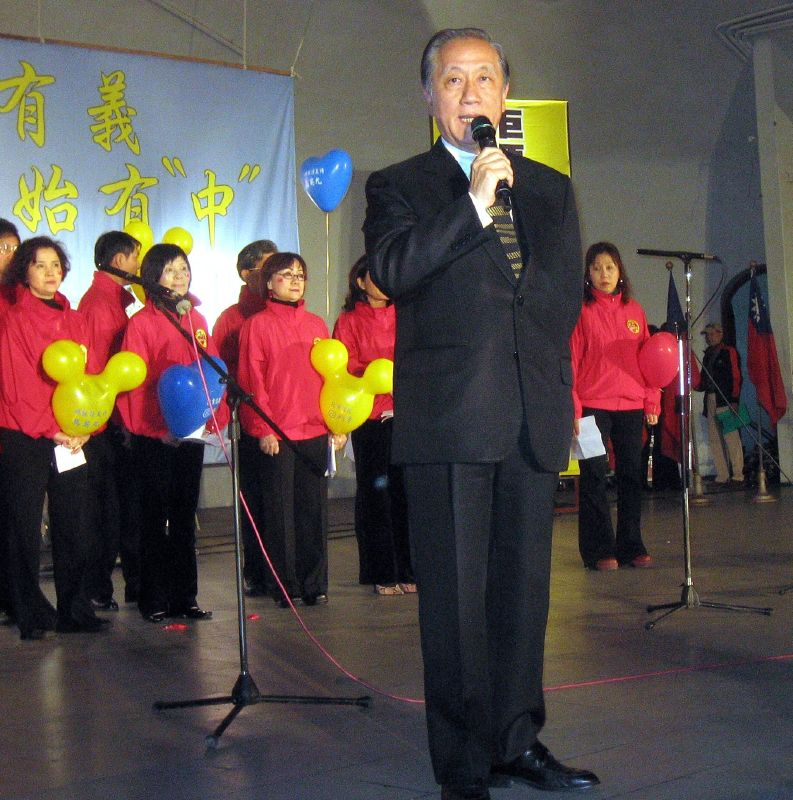
Yok Mu-ming at the New Party rally in 228 Park.

Convenors of the New Party National Committee

- Jaw Shaw-kong (August 1993 – May 1994)
- Yok Mu-ming (May 1994 – October 1994)
- Wang Chien-shien (October 1994 – August 1995)
- Chen Kuei-miao (August 1995 – August 1997)
- Chou Yang-shan (August 1997 – August 1998)
- Chen Kuei-miao (August 1998 – December 1998)
- Feng Ting-kuo (acting; December 1998 – January 1999)
- Lee Ching-hua (January 1999 – March 2000)
- Hau Lung-pin (March 2000 – March 2001)
- Hsieh Chi-ta (March 2001 – December 2001)
- Levi Ying (acting; December 2001 – January 2002)
- Yok Mu-ming (January 2002 – June 2003)

Chairmen of the New Party

- Yok Mu-ming (June 2003 – 21 February 2021)
- Wu Cherng-dean (since 21 February 2021)

Vice chairmen of the New Party

- Lee Sheng-feng (since 2016)

== See also ==
- Political status of Taiwan
- United front in Taiwan
