= Hsu Tain-tsair =

Taiwanese politician

- 許添財
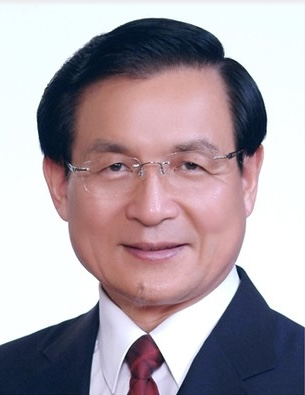

Mayor of Tainan
- In office 20 December 2001 – 25 December 2010
- Preceded by: George Chang
- Succeeded by: Lai Ching-te as mayor of Tainan (special municipality)

Member of the Legislative Yuan
- In office 11 March 2011 – 31 January 2016
- Preceded by: William Lai
- Succeeded by: Lin Chun-hsien
- Constituency: 4th constituency of Tainan City
- In office 1 February 1993 – 20 December 2001
- Constituency: Tainan City constituency

Personal details
- Born: 23 January 1951 (age 75) Guantian, Tainan County (now part of Tainan City), Taiwan
- Party: Democratic Progressive Party
- Spouse: Hung Shu-chen
- Education: Chinese Culture University (BA, MEc); Rutgers University; Columbia University; New School for Social Research
- Profession: Economist

Hsu Tain-tsair (Chinese: 許添財; pinyin: Xǔ Tiāncái; Wade–Giles: Hsu^{3} Tien^{1}-tsai^{2}; Pe̍h-ōe-jī: Khó͘ Thiam-châi; born 23 January 1953) is a Taiwanese politician who served as the mayor of Tainan City from 2001 to 2010.

Born in Tainan County (now part of Tainan City), Hsu earned two degrees from Chinese Culture University and studied for a PhD in economics in the United States, where he started participating in the independence movement of Taiwan. He was placed on the blacklist of the Kuomintang and was not allowed to return to Taiwan until 1990.

When Hsu returned to Taiwan, he joined the Democratic Progressive Party (DPP). Having been elected legislator three times, Hsu is considered a privy councilor to the DPP in the field of economics. He was nominated to run for the mayor of Tainan and was elected in 2001. During his terms as mayor, Hsu worked on public projects and encouraged tourism. For example, a police unit was established to facilitate tourists in 2007, and he also improved the environment of the city.

In 2009, Hsu worked with the Tainan County government to push for a merger that would form a special municipality. The merger was set to take effect in December 2010, giving Hsu one additional year in his mayoral term. During the DPP primary election for the nomination of a new Tainan mayor in May, he lost to William Lai by 12% of the votes. After Lai was elected mayor, Hsu later ran for Lai's seat as a member of Legislative Yuan and was finally elected.

== Early life and education ==
After graduating from Duba Elementary School in Tainan County, Hsu attended Tsengwen Junior High School (Chinese: 曾文中學; now Madou Junior High School), where he was a classmate of former Taiwanese president Chen Shui-bian for four years. He then attended Cheng Kung Senior High School. In 1976, Hsu earned a Master of Economics degree from Chinese Culture University and started teaching banking the next year at the same school.

In 1982, Hsu went to the United States as an exchange scholar at Columbia University. That same year, he joined the World United Formosans for Independence, and he also served as the literary editor for the Taiwan Tribune. As a result, he was placed on the Kuomintang's blacklist and was unable to return to Taiwan. While in the U.S., he was a PhD candidate at The New School for Social Research. In 1990, Hsu was invited to a meeting by President Lee Teng-hui and returned to Taiwan as a Taiwanese-American professor. With the influence of legislators Chen Shui-bian, Peng Pai-hsien, Hung Chi-chang, and Lu Hsiu-yi, the government relented and removed the restriction for Hsu to exit and enter the country, finally issuing him a new passport.

Hsu started helping members of the World United Formosans for Independence return to Taiwan in 1991. In 1992, after being nominated by the Democratic Progressive Party (DPP), Hsu was elected to become a member of the Legislative Yuan. In 1995, he was not nominated by the DPP, but was still elected as an independent candidate. He lost the election for the office of mayor of Tainan in 1997 and instead became the secretary-general of the New Nation Alliance shortly after the establishment of the organization. He was re-elected legislator in the 1998 legislative election. Hsu stepped out of the New Nation Alliance and rejoined the DPP shortly after his re-election to the Legislative Yuan. He was nominated by the DPP Central Executive Committee as the party's candidate for the Tainan mayoral race.

== Tainan mayoralty ==
Hsu was elected mayor of Tainan in 2001 and was re-elected to that post in 2004. In his terms as mayor, he focused on projects to beautify the city, set up cultural parks, and strive for major constructions. He worked to help the city profit from historical assets and restore Tainan's former splendor. He made 2007 Tainan's "year of culture and tourism" to promote Tainan's tourism attractions. His major mayoral achievements were the renovation of the city transportation system and overseeing the city's successful bids for the 2005 and 2006 Taiwan Lantern Festivals, the 2007 International Chihsi Arts Festival, and the 2007 National Games of Taiwan (全國運動會). One of his major goals, the renovation of the Tainan Railway Station and National Cheng Kung University, was scheduled to be completed during his term in office and has earned him high compliments.

Hsu supported a merger between Tainan City and Tainan County to form a special municipality. The Executive Yuan passed a resolution to upgrade the city, and the official merger will occur in December 2010. In January 2010, Hsu declared his candidacy in the 2010 municipal election. During the DPP primary election in May, he lost to fellow Tainan politician William Lai by 12% of the votes, ending his candidacy.

=== Development ===
During the DPP primary election for the presidential candidate's nomination, Hsu expressed that he "will not support the candidate that opposes the construction of an underground railway system in Tainan." Then-Premier Su Tseng-chang promised that the construction would be financially supported by the central government if he were elected. As a result, Hsu openly supported Su in the primary election.

He also believes that in order to improve the competitive advantage of Taiwan, the government should review the distribution of resources between northern and southern Taiwan, with the purpose of balancing their development. Hsu, as a member of the Democratic Progressive Party, also supports the independence movement of Taiwan. Hsu thinks that the United Nations membership referendum is an important step for democracy.

While the National Central Library is located in Taipei, Hsu strongly supports the establishment of a regional branch in Tainan City. The branch might be established in Kaohsiung City, another southern city. Hsu, however, is confident about Tainan being chosen as the location for the new branch because of the transport convenience and academic resources of the region.

=== Environment ===
Under his term, the environment of the city greatly improved. Hsu started a program of having the city's garbage trucks ring out brief English lessons in 2002. He promoted the use of eco-friendly chopsticks by requiring government officials and teachers to use their own reusable chopsticks when dining, expressing that the goal of the campaign is to reduce the use of disposable chopsticks by 100,000 pairs per day.

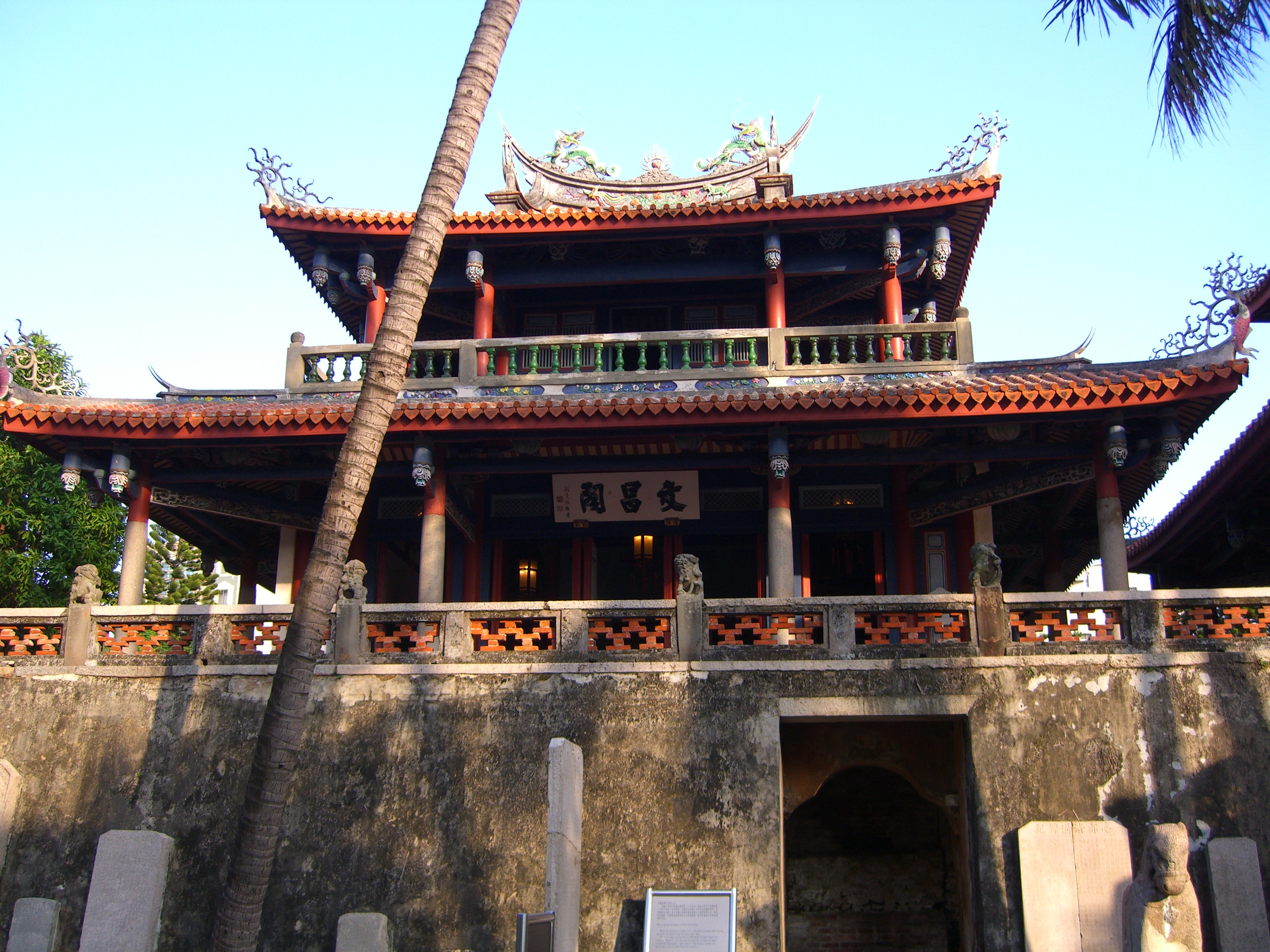
Under the Hsu administration, the Chihkan Tower became the first smoke-free historical site in Taiwan

During his second term in office, Tainan City became the first Taiwanese city to enter the Alliance for Healthy Cities of the World Health Organization. In addition, Tainan also became the first Taiwanese city to enter the Global Cities Dialogue. Hsu also believes that Tainan should become a city of international tourism and culture, and he is working towards that purpose. In September 2007, he spoke to the 2007 Asia-Pacific Cities Summit participants and stated that Tainan is blessed with natural, historical, cultural, and humanistic characteristics and that Tainan also possesses great conditions for high-tech, trade, and investment development.

Hsu worked to make Tainan a smoke-free environment. After the successful ban on smoking in public areas such as shopping centers, he pushed through the ban on smoking in historical sites. The Chihkan Tower became the first smoke-free historical site in Taiwan after the passing of the regulation in October 2007. Other historical sites covered by the regulation include Tainan Confucian Temple, Fort Zeelandia, and Eternal Golden Castle.

In January 2008, the government of Tainan started an operation to clean up dioxin-contaminated soil around the site of a defunct factory of Taiwan Alkali Industrial Corp (台鹼公司). The Hsu administration was the first to take action since 1982 when the government became aware of the mercury concentrations.

=== Law enforcement ===
Due to an accidental killing of a teenage girl, while trying to shoot a psychotic suspect, the Tainan City Police Bureau made a decision to develop a special kind of baton in 2006. When dealing with suspects without firearms, police officers are expected to use the baton first in order to reduce accidental shootings. To commemorate the girl who died, Mayor Hsu named the baton after her.

In September 2007, the Tourism Mounted Police Unit of Tainan (Chinese: 臺南市觀光騎警隊) was established to attract tourists. The members of the unit wear green uniforms and ride bicycles around the city on the weekends. They facilitate tourists and, at the same time, try to reduce the crime rate.

== Criticism ==
After the DPP nominated Hsu as the 2001 Tainan mayoral race candidate, protests led by supporters of the then-incumbent mayor George Chang, who is also a member of the DPP, arose. The protesters called Hsu a betrayer of the party as he left the party in 1995. They showed their disapproval of the party's choice by burning their party membership cards.

The prevention of dengue fever in Taiwan was always most successful in Tainan City. In 2007, however, outbreaks in the city were almost unstoppable. The fever outbreaks originally occurred only in Annan District, where the first case was reported in June. The health department failed to control the spread of the fever, and all six districts ended up having confirmed cases. There was also an outbreak in an old soldiers' home. On 22 August, Mayor Hsu apologized for the disastrous outbreak of dengue fever; he announced that the health department would be reorganized and new officials would be appointed in six months.

=== Mayoral scandals ===
While the then-mayor of Taipei Ma Ying-jeou was indicted for alleged misuse of "special allowance fund," prosecutors dropped Hsu Tain-tsair's case in March 2007. However, on 10 April 2007, Hsu was indicted by prosecutors for his alleged involvement in a construction scandal and violations of the Government Procurement Act (Chinese: 政府採購法). The scandal was broken by the Tainan City councillor Hsieh Long-chieh (謝龍介) in May 2006 during a council meeting.

In April 2007, Hsu was indicted by the Tainan prosecutors. In their statement of charges, the prosecutors accused Hsu of money grafting in an underground city construction project. According to Hsu, the prosecutors heavily used the testimonies of people who were convicted of crime. In August 2009, Hsu was found not guilty by the Tainan District Court.

== Electoral history ==
Tainan City legislative election, 1995
Candidate	Votes	%	±
Hsu Tain-tsair		20.07	
Shih Ming-te		18.81	
Shih Tai-sheng		15.02	
Tu Chen-jung		12.25	
George Chang		10.05	

Tainan City mayoral election, 1997
Candidate	Votes	%	±
George Chang		35.75	
Lin Nan-sheng		20.97	
Hsu Tain-tsair		19.77	

Tainan City legislative election, 1998
Candidate	Votes	%	±
Chen Rong-shen		12.36	
Hsu Tain-tsair		11.84	
Lin Nan-sheng		11.84	
Lai Ching-te		10.6	
Wang Yi-ting		10.59	
Tang Bi-a		10.24	

Tainan City mayoral election, 2001
Candidate	Votes	%	±
Hsu Tain-tsair		43.23	
Chen Rong-shen		37.40	
Su Nan-cheng		14.36	
George Chang		2.9	

Tainan City mayoral election, 2005
Candidate	Votes	%	±
Hsu Tain-tsair		45.65	
Chen Rong-shen		41.40	
Chien Lin Hui-chun		12.95	

Government offices
Preceded by George Chang	Mayor of Tainan; 20 December 2001 – 25 December 2010	Succeeded by William Lai (special municipality)
