= Cho Chun-ying =

Taiwanese politician

Chuo Chun-ying
- 卓春英

Personal details
- Born: 10 February 1955 (age 70); Kaohsiung County (now part of Kaohsiung City), Taiwan
- Political party: Democratic Progressive Party
- Education: Tunghai University; Chinese University of Hong Kong

Cho Chun-ying (Chinese: 卓春英; pinyin: Zhuó Chūnyīng; Wade–Giles: Chuó Chūn-yīng; born 10 February 1955), a Taiwanese politician, is the deputy secretary of the Republic of China Presidential Office Department of Public Affairs. She has been vice magistrate of Kaohsiung County and acting mayor of Tainan City.

== Health conditions ==
In July 2005, Cho had her uterine fibroids treated surgically.

Government offices
Preceded by George Chang	Mayor of Tainan (acting); 2001	Succeeded by Hsu Tain-tsair
