= FoRmosan SoR Party =

Single-issue political party in Taiwan

FoRmosan SoR Party 臺灣SoR無法黨
- Founder: Wen Hsiao
- Founded: January 19, 2020
- Headquarters: Taipei
- Ideology: Single-issue

Website
- www.miparty.org

The FoRmosan SoR Party (Chinese: 臺灣SoR無法黨), formerly named MiLinguall Party (Chinese: 臺灣雙語無法黨), is a single-issue political party in Taiwan. The party was founded by Wen Hsiao on January 19, 2020, and advocates for better bilingual education in the country through the inclusion of science of reading into school curricula.

== History ==
The MiLinguall Party was founded by Wen Hsiao, part-time professor at the National Taiwan Normal University and former interpreter for president Chen Shui-bian, on January 19, 2020. 145 members, mostly educators and parents, joined the party.

The party has three main political views and intends to dissolve itself once all three are met: to synchronize bilingual education in Taiwan with that of the US and Australia, to incorporate science of reading (SoR) into school curricula, and to enforce SoR through legislation. According to Hsiao, the party's ultimate goal is the completion of 2030 Bilingual Nation, a project initiated by the Tsai and Lai administrations that aims to establish English as a co-official language.

The party ran 10 regional constituency candidates and 2 party-list representatives in the 2024 legislative elections. It won 44,852 party-list votes (0.33% of total votes cast), failing to reach the 5% threshold for representation in the Legislative Yuan. Out of the 16 parties that received votes, it finished 9th, above the New Party and Taiwan Solidarity Union. In regional constituencies, voters were urged by MiLinguall candidates to vote for a major party instead. Its best result in 2024 was in Tainan's fifth constituency, receiving 38,695 or 23.46% of the vote.

In August 2026, after being renamed the "FoRmosan SoR Party," the party fielded Wen Hsiao for Mayor of Taipei and Hsiao Lin-hung for Mayor of Tainan in the 2026 local elections.
