= Shikai (disambiguation) =

Yuan Shikai (Chinese: 袁世凯; 1859–1916) was a Chinese general and statesman, and the first president of the Republic of China.

Shikai could also refer to:

- He Shikai (Chinese: 和士開; 524–571), Northern Qi dynasty official
- Xu Shikai (Chinese: 許世楷), Taiwanese independence activist
- Shikai District (also spelled "Shikai District"), a district of Badakhshan Province, Afghanistan
