= TAHR =

TAHR may become:

- Tahr, a type of mammal
- Taiwan Association for Human Rights, an organization in Taiwan
