= Lin Chun-hsien =

Taiwanese politician

Lin Chun-hsien MLY
- 林俊憲
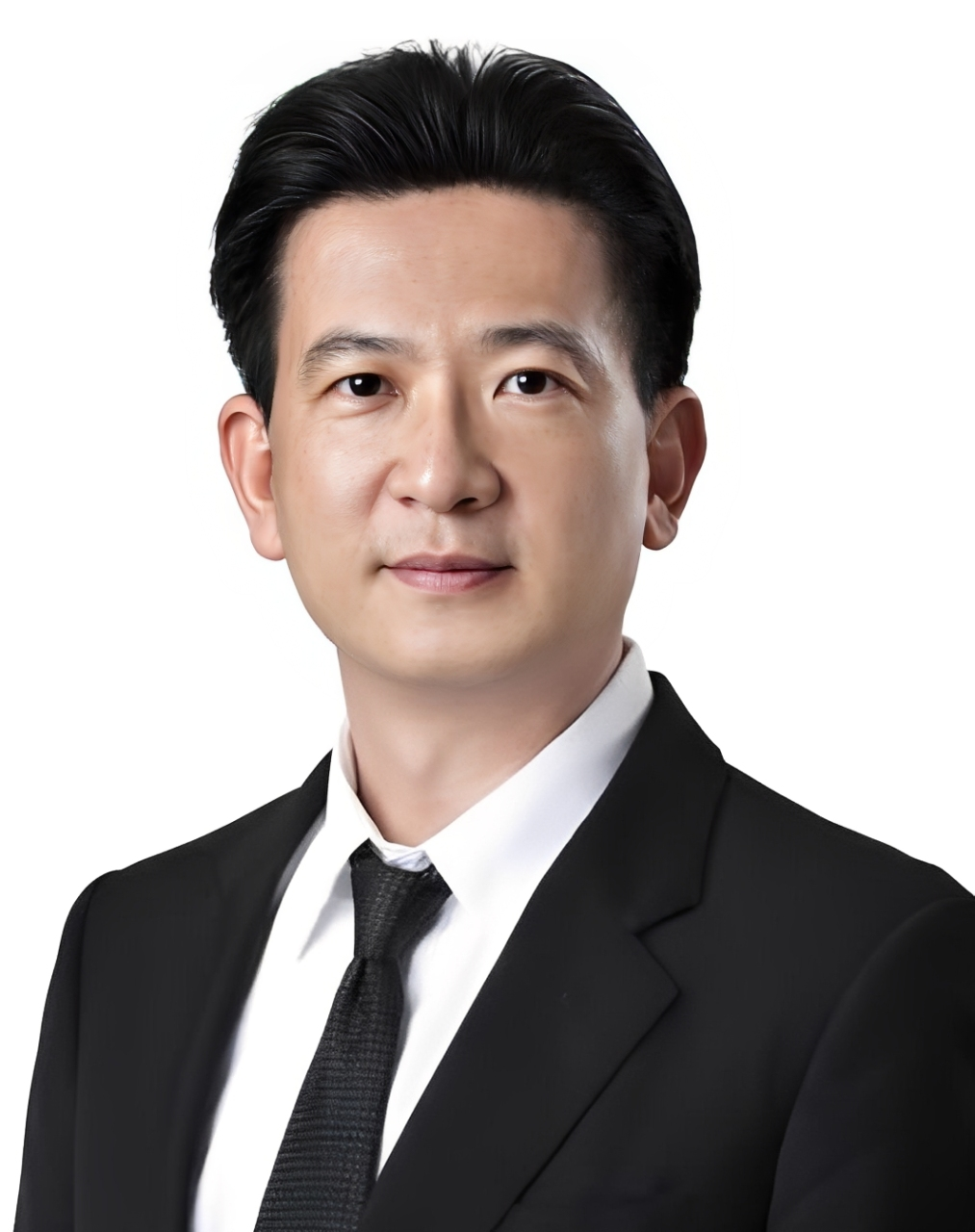
- Official portrait, 2019

Member of the Legislative Yuan
- Incumbent
- Assumed office 1 February 2016
- Preceded by: Hsu Tain-tsair
- Constituency: Tainan 4 Tainan 5

Tainan City Councillor
- In office 1 March 1998 – 25 December 2010
- Constituency: 3rd District

Personal details
- Born: 17 March 1965 (age 61) Tainan, Taiwan
- Party: Democratic Progressive Party
- Education: National Cheng Kung University (BBA); University of Missouri (MBA, MS); National Taiwan University (PhD)

Lin Chun-hsien (Chinese: 林俊憲; born 17 March 1965) is a Taiwanese politician currently serving as a member of the Legislative Yuan. He is a member of the Democratic Progressive Party (DPP) and its New Tide faction. He has served three terms in the Legislative Yuan, and has also served as a member of the Central Standing Committee of the Democratic Progressive Party. He previously was a member of the Tainan City Council for three terms.

== Education ==
After graduating from National Tainan First Senior High School, Lin studied business administration as an undergraduate at National Chengchi University and graduated with a bachelor's degree. He then earned a Master of Business Administration (M.B.A.) and a Master of Science (M.S.) from the University of Missouri in the United States. Afterwards, he returned to Taiwan and earned his Ph.D. from National Taiwan University.

== Political career ==
From 1998 to 2010, Lin was a councilor of Tainan City Council. Since 2016, he has been a member of the Legislative Yuan.

While being a DPP legislator on 29 May 2026, he called on the Taiwan Education Ministry to ban unauthorized sales of products at universities. This request was sparked due to reports he said were received about salesman selling overpriced books and courses on campuses across Taiwan.
