= Koh Se-kai =

Taiwanese politician and diplomat (born 1934)

- 許世楷
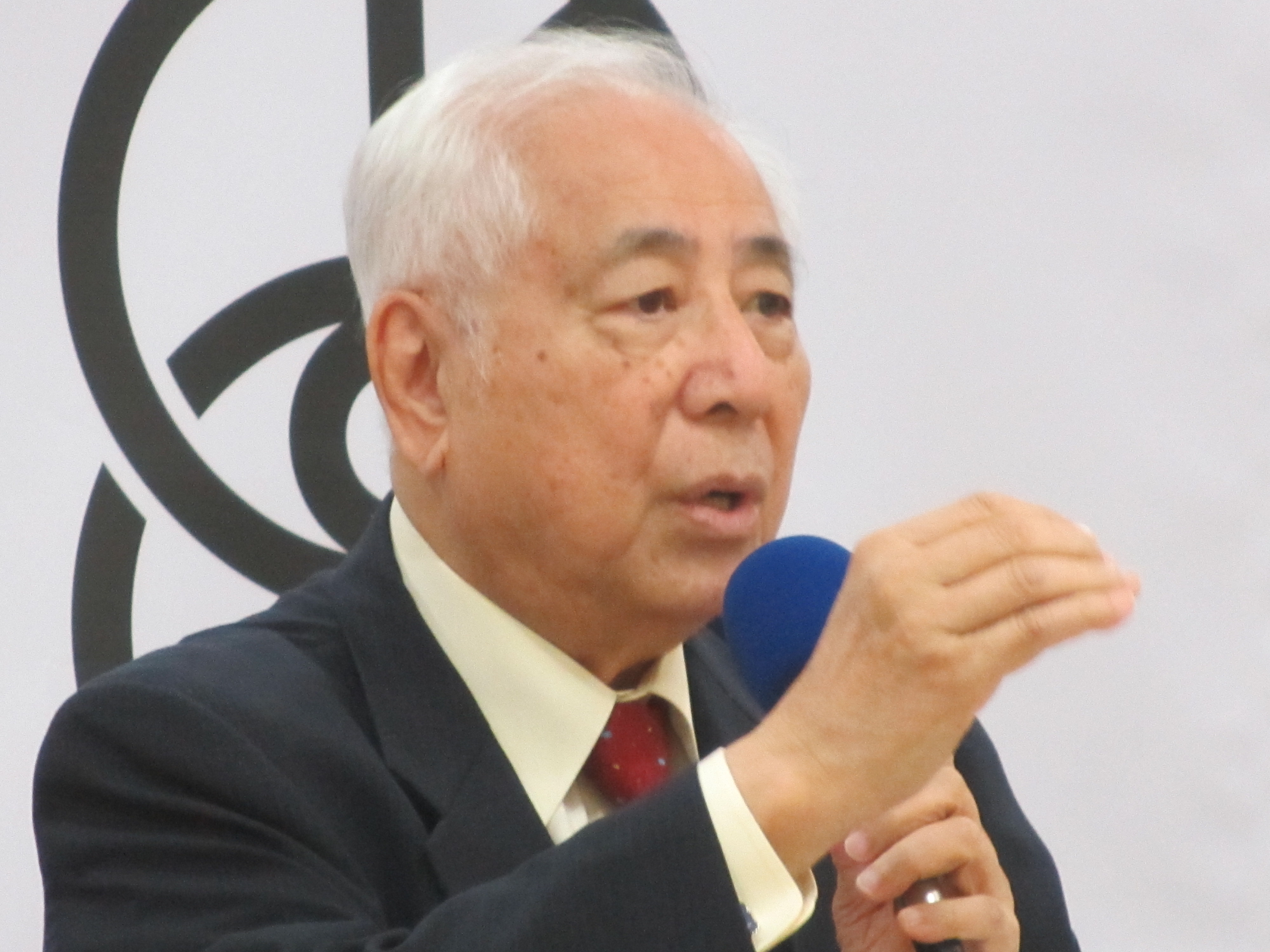
- Koh in 2015
- Born: July 7, 1934 (age 92); Changhua Prefecture, Taiwan
- Citizenship: Empire of Japan (1934–1945); Republic of China (1945–)
- Education: National Taiwan University (BA); Waseda University (MA); University of Tokyo (PhD)
- Occupations: Historian; activist; law professor
- Political party: Taiwan Independence Party (1996–2000); Independent (after 2000)

Koh Se-kai (Chinese: 許世楷; pinyin: Xǔ Shìkǎi; Wade–Giles: Hsu^{3} Shih^{4}-kai^{3}; Pe̍h-ōe-jī: Khó͘ Sè-khái; born July 7, 1934) is a Taiwanese historian, politician, and diplomat. He was a major leader of the Taiwan independence movement. In 2004, Koh was appointed to be the Republic of China’s top representative to Japan. By June 2008, Koh had retired.

== Early life ==
=== Family ===
Koh was born in Changhua City, Japanese Taiwan. His grandfather, Koh Chia-chung, was a member of the Taiwanese Cultural Association who was arrested and persecuted by Japanese authorities in 1923. His father, Koh Nai-pang, was a prominent lawyer who graduated from the Faculty of Law at Kyoto University and from the Faculty of Economics at the University of Tokyo. His mother, Hung Chin-chueh, was a physician who graduated from Tokyo Women's Medical College and practiced medicine in Caotun, Nantou, after returning to Taiwan. Koh Se-kai's uncle was Koh Nai-chang, a well-known left-wing political activist who studied at Moscow Sun Yat-sen University.

=== Education ===
After attending the Affiliated Senior High School of National Taiwan Normal University, Koh graduated from National Taiwan University with a B.A. in political science in 1957. He then was awarded a scholarship in 1959 by the Japanese Ministry of Education, Science, Sports and Culture to pursue graduate studies in Japan. He earned a master's degree in political science from Waseda University in 1962 and a Ph.D. in law from the University of Tokyo in 1968.

Party political offices
Preceded by Chen-Yuan Lee	Chairperson of the TAIP; 1997 – 1998	Succeeded by Cheng Pang-chen
Preceded by George Chang	Chairperson of the WUFI; 1987 – 1991	Succeeded by George Chang
