= Shih Chih-ming =

Taiwanese politician

- 施治明
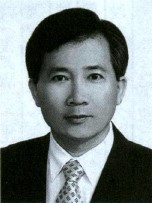

Mayor of Tainan
- In office 20 December 1989 – 20 December 1997
- Preceded by: Lin Wen-hsiung (林文雄)
- Succeeded by: George Chang

Personal details
- Born: 28 October 1952 (age 73) Annan, Tainan
- Party: Kuomintang
- Profession: Politician

Shih Chih-ming (Chinese: 施治明; pinyin: Shī Zhìmíng; Pe̍h-ōe-jī: Si Tī-bêng; born 28 October 1952) is a Taiwanese politician of the Kuomintang party. He served two consecutive terms as mayor of Tainan City, from 1989 to 1997.

He contested the 2001 Tainan municipal election as an independent, and was not elected to the Tainan City Council. During that election cycle, Shih was indicted by the Tainan City Prosecutors' Office on corruption charges. The Supreme Court ruled on charges of bribery against Shih in July 2005, sentencing him to eight years and six months imprisonment.
