= Hsu Shui-teh =

Taiwanese politician (1931–2021)

- 許水德
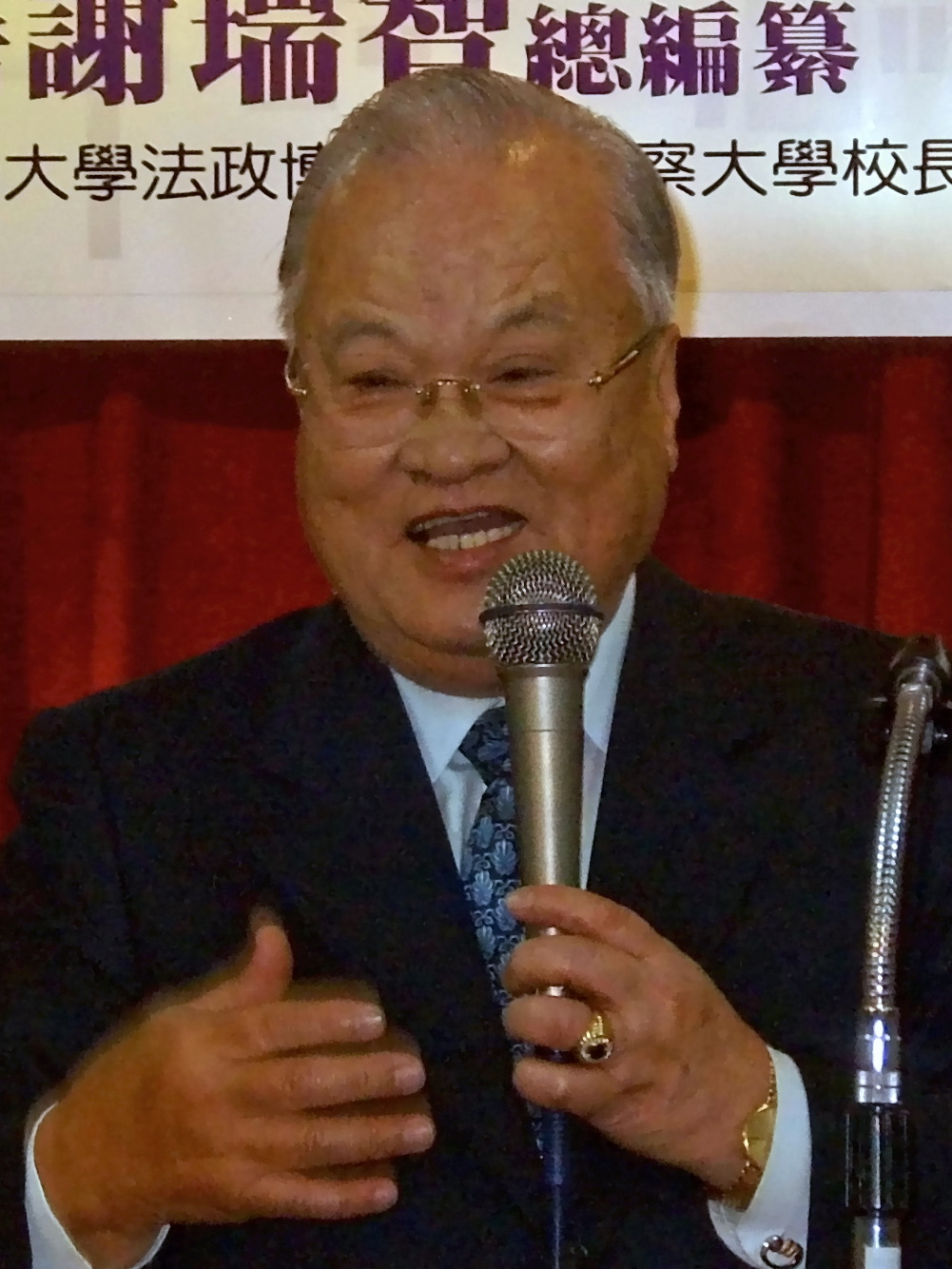

Chairman of the Association of East Asian Relations
- In office 2 September 2002 – July 2004

President of the Examination Yuan
- In office 1 September 1996 – 31 August 2002

Secretary-General of the Kuomintang
- In office 10 March 1993 – 16 August 1996
- Chairman: Lee Teng-hui

Minister of the Interior
- In office 22 July 1988 – 31 May 1991

Chairman of the Central Election Commission
- In office 22 July 1988 – 1 June 1991

7th Mayor of Taipei
- In office 30 May 1985 – 25 July 1988

Mayor of Kaohsiung
- In office 18 April 1982 – 30 May 1985

Personal details
- Born: 1 August 1931 Takao, Taiwan, Empire of Japan
- Died: 31 March 2021 (aged 89)
- Party: Kuomintang
- Education: National Taiwan Normal University (BEd); National Chengchi University (MEd)

Hsu Shui-teh (simplified Chinese: 许水德; traditional Chinese: 許水德; pinyin: Xǔ Shuǐdé; 1 August 1931 – 31 March 2021) was a Taiwanese politician. He was the President of the Examination Yuan from 1996 to 2002. He died of pneumonia on 31 March 2021, at the age of 89.

== Education ==
Hsu earned his bachelor's and master's degrees in education from Taiwan Provincial Normal University and National Chengchi University, respectively.

Government offices
Preceded by Yang Chin-tsung	Mayor of Kaohsiung; 1982–1985	Succeeded by Su Nan-cheng
Preceded by Yang Chin-tsung	Mayor of Taipei; 1985–1988	Succeeded by Wu Po-hsiung
Preceded by Wu Po-hsiung	Minister of the Interior; 1988–1991	Succeeded by Wu Po-hsiung
Preceded by Wu Po-hsiung	Chairman of the Central Election Commission; 1988–1991	Succeeded by Wu Po-hsiung
Preceded by James Soong	Secretary-General of the Kuomintang; 1993–1996	Succeeded by Wu Po-hsiung
Preceded by Chiu Chuang-huan	President of the Examination Yuan; 1996–2002	Succeeded by Yao Chia-wen
Preceded by Chuang Ming-yao	Chairman of the Association of East Asian Relations; 2002–2004	Succeeded by Lo Fu-chen
