= George Chang =

Taiwanese politician and independence activist

Chang Tsan-hung
- 張燦鍙
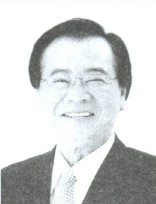

Mayor of Tainan
- In office 20 December 1997 – 20 December 2001
- Preceded by: Shih Chih-ming
- Succeeded by: Cho Chun-ying

Personal details
- Born: 1 March 1936 (age 90) Tainan Prefecture (now part of Tainan City), Taiwan under Japanese rule
- Party: Democratic Progressive Party
- Spouse: Tina
- Education: National Taiwan University (BS); California Institute of Technology (MS); Rice University (PhD)
- Profession: Chemical engineer

Chang Tsan-hung (Chinese: 張燦鍙; pinyin: Zhāng Cànhòng; Wade–Giles: Chāng Tsàn-hùng; born 1 March 1936), also known by his English name George Chang, is a Taiwanese politician, chemical engineer, and independence activist. He was the mayor of Tainan City from 1997 to 2001.

== Early life and education ==
After graduating from the National Tainan First Senior High School, Chang studied chemical engineering at National Taiwan University and received a bachelor's degree in 1958. He then completed graduate studies in the United States, earning his Ph.D. in chemical engineering from Rice University in 1965.

After receiving his doctorate, Chang taught chemical engineering as a professor at the Cooper Union.

During his stay in the US, Chang started taking part in the Taiwan independence movement. He was the first vice chairperson of the World United Formosans for Independence (WUFI), and became its chairperson in 1973. During the occurrence of the Kaohsiung Incident, Chang also advocated many Taiwanese Americans to support the democratic movement going on in Taiwan.

In 1991, Chang returned to Taiwan. In the same year, he was indicted for "leading a rebellion" (首謀內亂罪). However, because of the amendment of "Crime Law Article 100" (刑法第100條), he was pleaded not guilty in October 1992. He later joined the Democratic Progressive Party (DPP) and was nominated by the party to run for legislator. However, he was not elected as he only got thirty thousand votes. In 1997, he was nominated by the DPP to run for the mayor of Tainan and was elected with over one hundred thousand. He became the first mayor of Tainan to be a member of the DPP.

== Mayoralty ==
Chang served as mayor of Tainan from 1997 through 2001.

=== Achievements ===
Chang is known for his impetus to improve the conditions of the Anping Port, the Tainan Confucian Temple, and the Tainan Canal (台南運河). He also opened many historic sites to night-time visits. He had a goal to spur the cultural and tourist industries by preserving historic sites.

Under his term, he proposed and carried out many plans to improve the city. These plans include "Flat Road Proposal" (路平專案), "Fixing the Malfunctioning Streetlights Before Sunset, After Reporting" (路燈查報、當天天黑前修復), "Park Adoption" (公園認養), "No Trash on the Ground" (垃圾不落地), and "Recycling" (資源回收), which improved the living quality of the residents. The public security of the city also improved a lot since Chang's term as Tainan ranked second place out of the five provincial city of Taiwan, the first being Keelung. Chang also started the first Voluntary Firefighting Communication Team of the nation, which secured the lives and properties of the residents.

=== Scandals ===
During Chang's mayoral term, he was involved with several scandals. In August 2000, he was indicted by the Tainan District Court (台南地檢署) for his involvement with the Tainan Canal Renovating Construction Scandal (台南運河整治工程弊案). In November, he was indicted again for the Hsinchi Industrial District Scandal (新吉工業區弊案). In 2001, he was indicted for a land requisition scam (土地徵收貪污弊案). His cases were appealed to the Supreme Court, which found Chang guilty and sentenced him to three years in prison. Chang served two years of his sentence in Tainan Prison, when he was given medical parole in March 2016 and released.

== See also ==
- Mark Chen
- Tainan County
- Taiwanese localization movement

Government offices
Preceded by Shih Chih-ming	Mayor of Tainan; 1997–2001	Succeeded by Cho Chun-ying (acting)
Party political offices
Preceded by Peng Ming-min	Chairperson of the WUFI; 1973–1987	Succeeded by Koh Se-kai
Preceded by Koh Se-kai	Chairperson of the WUFI; 1991–1995	Succeeded by Ng Chiau-tong
