= Tainan City Constituency 5 =

Constituency of the Legislative Yuan of Taiwan

- Single-member constituency for the Legislative Yuan
- District(s): Anping, South, West Central, East (16 villages)
- Electorate: 265,687 (2024 election)

Current constituency
- Created: 2020
- Party: DPP
- Member: Lin Chun-hsien
- Created from: Tainan City Constituency 4 (2008-2020) - without 29 villages of East; Tainan City Constituency 3 (2008-2020) - West Central only

Tainan City Constituency 5 (Chinese: 臺南市第五選舉區) is one of the 73 regional constituencies represented in the Legislative Yuan, the national legislature of Taiwan. It was created in 2020 following boundary changes across Taiwan, and elects one legislator, through first-past-the-post voting, to the Legislative Yuan. It has been represented by Lin Chun-hsien of the Democratic Progressive Party since 2020.

== Legislators ==
Election	Legislator	Party
2020	Lin Chun-hsien	Democratic Progressive Party

== Election results ==

=== 2020 ===
2020 Taiwanese legislative election: Tainan 5
Candidate	Party	Votes	%
Lin Chun-hsien	Democratic Progressive Party	110,547	55.41
Tsai Shu-hui	Kuomintang	67,364	33.76
Lin Yi-feng	Independent	10,110	5.07
Li Po-li	Stabilizing Force Party	6,350	3.18
Chen Chih-hsiao	Independent	4,175	2.09
Wu Ping-hui	Independent	973	0.49
Total		199,519	100.00
Valid votes		199,519	98.51
Invalid/blank votes		3,021	1.49
Total votes		202,540	100.00
Registered voters/turnout		265,703	76.23
Majority		43,183	21.65
Democratic Progressive Party win (new seat)			

=== 2024 ===
* denotes the incumbent legislator

2024 Taiwanese legislative election: Tainan 5
Candidate	Party	Votes	%	+/–
Lin Chun-hsien*	Democratic Progressive Party	126,248	76.54	▲21.13
Hsiao Lin-hung	MiLinguall Party	38,695	23.46	NEW
Total		164,943	100.00	–
Valid votes		164,943	85.85	
Invalid/blank votes		27,197	14.15	
Total votes		192,140	100.00	
Registered voters/turnout		265,687	72.32	
Majority		87,553	53.08	
Democratic Progressive Party hold				
