= Mutual non-recognition of sovereignty and mutual non-denial of authority to govern =

Ma Ying-jeou's view of cross-strait relations

Special non-state-to-state relations
- Traditional Chinese: 特殊非兩國論
- Simplified Chinese: 特殊非两国论
Transcriptions
Standard Mandarin
- Hanyu Pinyin: Tèshū fēi liǎngguó lùn

"Mutual non-recognition of sovereignty and mutual non-denial of authority to govern" (Chinese: 互不承認主權，互不否認治權) is former President of the Republic of China Ma Ying-jeou's description of the relations between the Taiwan Area and Mainland China, as presented in his second inauguration speech after being re-elected in 2012. Sometimes the term special non-state-to-state relations (特殊非兩國論) is used in the press for this concept, following his own statements. Ma defines the relations as a "special relationship for which the model of [state] recognition under conventional international law is not applicable". This marks a departure from the views of his predecessors, former presidents Lee Teng-hui's special state-to-state relations and Chen Shui-bian's One Country on Each Side: Both defined the Republic of China (ROC) and the People's Republic of China (PRC) as states and the relationship between the two as one between two states. In Ma's view, the ROC government considers the one China as the ROC, regardless of the view of the PRC government. While neither governing authority can recognize that in the other area as a legitimate state, neither would deny the other side being the de facto governing authority of its area.

== Background ==
President Ma Ying-jeou on 2 September 2008 stated in an interview with the Mexico-based press, Sol de Mexico, that the relations between mainland China and Taiwan are "special", but "not that between two states", because neither the Constitution of the People's Republic of China nor the Constitution of the ROC allows for another state to exist in their respective claimed territory. He conceded the sovereignty issues between the two cannot be resolved at present, but citing the 1992 Consensus as a temporary measure for the issues, as both accept the One China principle but agrees to differ on the definition of that one "China".

Presidential Office spokesman Wang Yu-chi later elaborated the president's statement and said that under the 11th amendment of the ROC Constitution and the "Statute Governing the Relations Between the Peoples of the Taiwan Area and Mainland Area", the relationship between Taiwan and mainland China is one between two regions of one country. From the ROC's perspective, that country is the ROC.

Ma Ying-jeou was interviewed by the Japanese magazine World on 7 October 2008. In answering questions relating to the "Special non-state-to-state relations", he said that the ROC "definitely is an independent sovereign state", and under its constitution, mainland China is part of the territory of the ROC. The ROC cannot recognise the existence of another state in its territory, nor does the People's Republic of China want to recognize the ROC. In other words, the ROC does not consider the PRC a state. Accordingly, laws relating to international relations cannot be applied regarding the relations between Taiwan and mainland China.

In an interview with the Central News Agency on 25 October 2008, Ma Ying-jeou clarified that conceptualising Taiwan and mainland China as "two areas" was not his invention, but believed the framework offered a way for the two sides of the Taiwan Strait to sidestep sovereignty questions in pursuing closer ties as long as each side did not deny the other's existence. Ma said consultations between the two sides' intermediary bodies have been conducted under such a "mutual non-denial" framework. According to Ma, the "two areas" concept could be dated back to 1991, when then-President Lee Teng-hui announced the termination of the Period of National Mobilisation for Suppression of the Communist Rebellion to acknowledge the fact that the two sides of the Taiwan Strait are under separate rule. The move symbolised that the communist regime established on 1 October 1949 in mainland China is no longer considered by the ROC as a "rebellious group", but "a governing authority that has de facto rule of the mainland", Ma said. Over the past 17 years, several other concepts have been put forth by the country's leaders to try to define Cross-Strait relations, but none has been proven feasible, he said. These include the special state-to-state relations proposed by Lee in 1999, and the one country on each side theory raised by then President Chen Shui-bian in 2002, Ma noted.

== Legacy ==
In the runup to the 2024 presidential election, the Kuomintang candidate Hou Yu-ih reiterated this mutual non-denial framework in the context of the 1992 Consensus, in an interview with the Japanese public broadcaster NHK in August 2023.

== See also ==
- Chinese Civil War
- Political status of Taiwan
- Two Chinas
