= Su Nan-cheng =

Taiwanese politician (1936–2014)

- 蘇南成
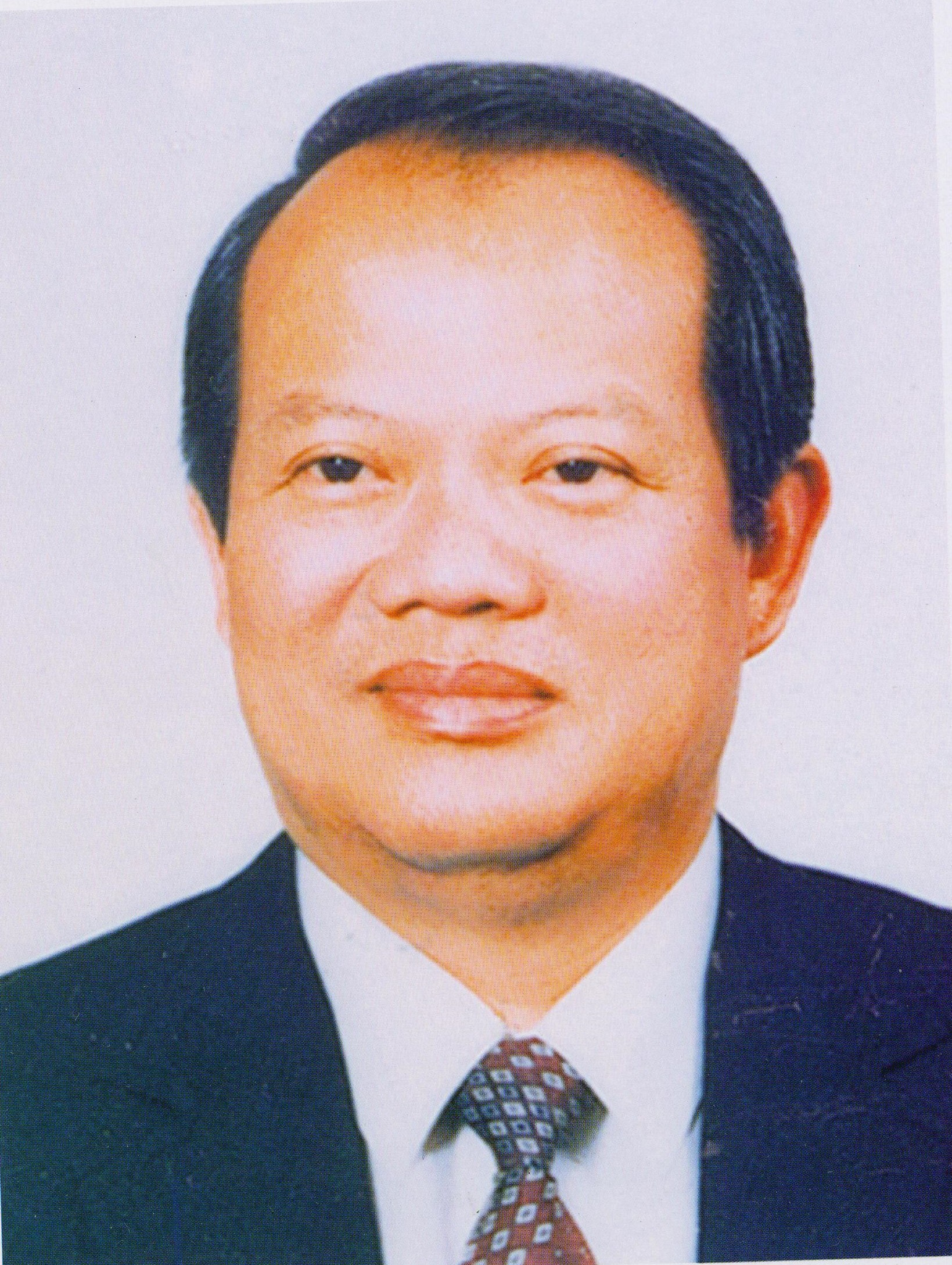

Mayor of Kaohsiung
- In office 30 May 1985 – 15 June 1990
- Preceded by: Hsu Shui-teh
- Succeeded by: Wu Den-yih

Mayor of Tainan
- In office 20 December 1977 – 30 May 1985
- Preceded by: Chang Li-tang
- Succeeded by: Chen Kuei-miao (acting); Lin Wen-hsiung

Personal details
- Born: 14 January 1936 Tainan Prefecture, Taiwan, Empire of Japan
- Died: 2 September 2014 (aged 78) Tainan, Taiwan
- Party: Kuomintang (1952 – 1972; 1982 – 1999)
- Education: National Cheng Kung University (BS)
- Profession: Accountant

Su Nan-cheng (Chinese: 蘇南成; pinyin: Sū Nánchéng; 14 January 1936 – 2 September 2014) was a Taiwanese politician and Senior Advisor to ROC President Chen Shui-bian. He was a mayor of Tainan, serving from 1977 to 1985, and an appointed mayor of Kaohsiung, serving from 1985 to 1990. He was the speaker of the ROC National Assembly in 1999. Su was in the Kuomintang and was part of the faction that supported the Taiwanese localization movement. He was expelled from the KMT twice: first in 1972 for violating a party resolution and running for Tainan City Mayor as an independent; second in 1999 for forwarding a term-extension amendment in the National Assembly against party orders. In 2003, Su openly supported DPP candidate Chen Shui-bian in the 2004 presidential election.

== Education ==
Su graduated from National Cheng Kung University with a Bachelor of Science (B.S.) in accounting and statistics in 1959.

== Tainan mayoralty ==
Su was elected the mayor of Tainan in 1976 as an independent candidate. In 1981, he was nominated by the Kuomintang to run again and was re-elected. He served from 1977 to 1985, until he was appointed the mayor of Kaohsiung. During his term as Tainan mayor, he was recognized by the Ramon Magsaysay Award. He ran unsuccessfully for mayor of Tainan in 2001 as an independent candidate, and was elected a city council member instead.

He died of heart failure in 2014.

== Notes ==
Government offices
Preceded by Chang Li-tang	Mayor of Tainan; 1977–1985	Succeeded by Chen Kuei-miao (acting)
Preceded by Hsu Shui-teh	Mayor of Kaohsiung; 1985–1990	Succeeded by Wu Den-yih
