= Taiwan Association for Human Rights =

Organization of Taiwan

- 台灣人權促進會
- Formation: 10 December 1984; 41 years ago
- Headquarters: Zhongshan, Taipei, Taiwan
- Region served: Taiwan
- Secretary General: Yu Yi-chia
- President: Tu Yu-Yin
- Key people: Peter Huang
- Website: www.tahr.org.tw

The Taiwan Association for Human Rights (TAHR; Chinese: 台灣人權促進會; pinyin: Táiwān Rénquán Cùjìn Huì) is a Taiwan based non-governmental organization which was established on International Human Rights Day, December 10, 1984. TAHR is the oldest independent human rights organization in Taiwan.

== See also ==
- Human rights in Taiwan
