= Cheng Tzu-tsai =

Taiwanese political activist and architect

- 鄭自才
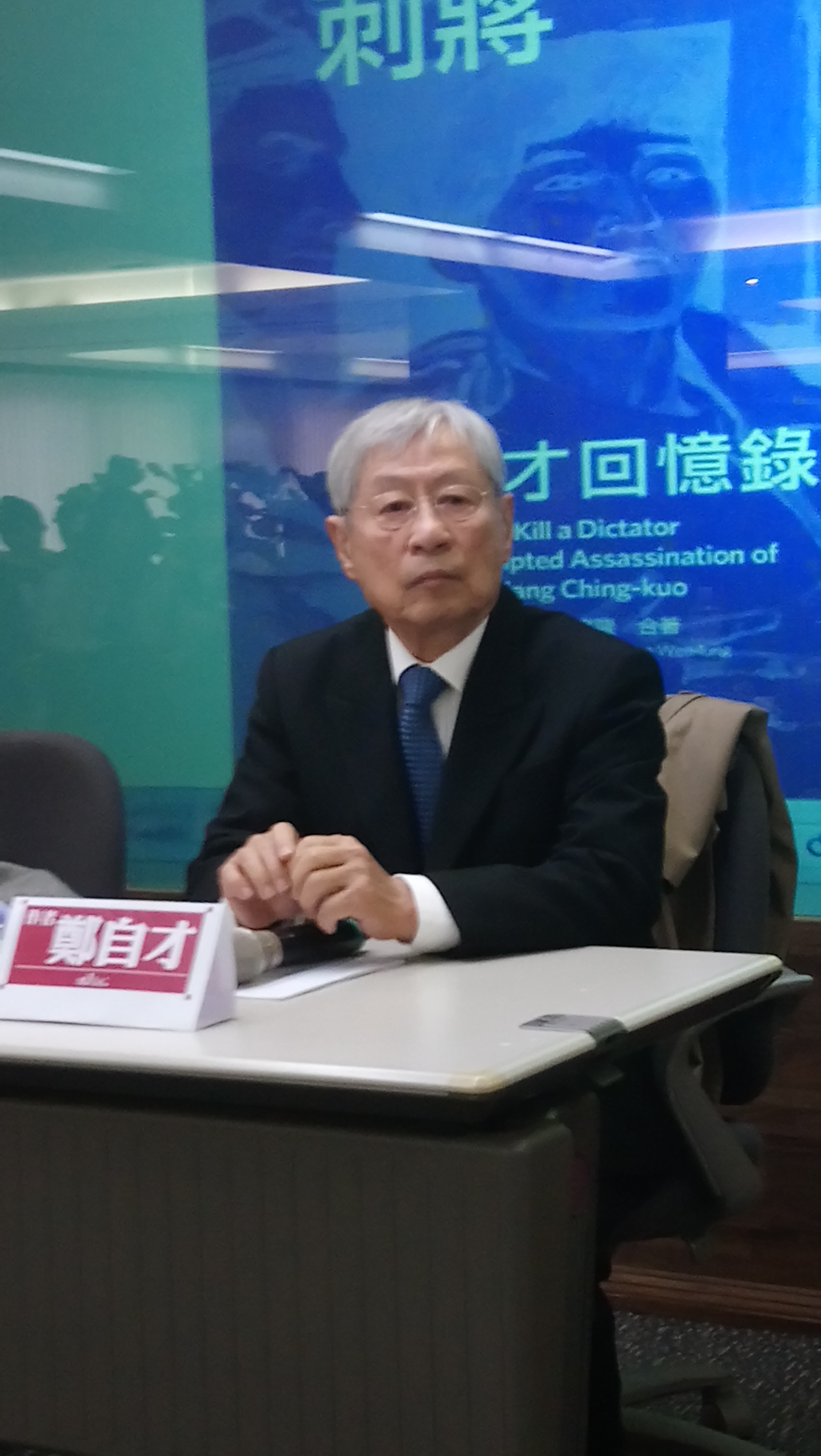
- Born: 1 December 1936 (age 89); Tainan, Taiwan, Empire of Japan
- Other name: T.T. Deh
- Education: National Cheng Kung University (BS); Carnegie Mellon University (MArch)
- Occupation: Architect
- Known for: 1970 assassination attempt on Chiang Ching-kuo with Peter Huang
- Notable work: 228 Massacre Monument
- Spouse(s): Huang Ching-mei (1964–197x); Ellen Wu (197x–)
- Children: daughter (b.1965) son (b.1967) son named Dai (b.1979)

Cheng Tzu-tsai (Chinese: 鄭自才; pinyin: Zhèng Zìcái; Pe̍h-ōe-jī: Tēⁿ Chū-châi, born 鄭自財 on 1 December 1936; also known as TT Deh) is a Taiwanese architect and political dissident who conspired with others in the 1970 assassination attempt of Chiang Ching-kuo, the son of Chiang Kai-shek, in New York City.

== Early life ==
Cheng was born on 1 December 1936 in Tainan when Taiwan was part of the Empire of Japan. He was the third of seven children, and his father was a wholesale fruit distributor.

In 1955, Cheng entered National Cheng Kung University (NCKU) as an architecture student. While enrolled at NCKU, he was offered an application to join the Kuomintang (KMT) ruling party, but chose not to join, stating that he thought it was unfair that economic benefits were disproportionately distributed to party members. After graduating and fulfilling his compulsory military service, he returned to NCKU in 1960 as a teaching assistant. However, since he was not a KMT member, the school could not continue to employ him and he was dismissed after two weeks. He left Tainan and started work as a teaching assistant in the recently formed Chung Yuan Christian College of Science and Engineering Department of Architecture instead, leaving in 1962 to study in the United States.

Cheng enrolled at Carnegie Mellon University in the fall of 1962, where he encountered other Taiwan-born students advocating for independence. He was also influenced by the simultaneous Civil Rights Movement in the United States, attending the March on Washington in 1963. Cheng joined the United Formosans for Independence, predecessor to the World United Formosans for Independence (WUFI) later that year.

While in Pittsburgh, Cheng met, and in 1964 married Huang Ching-mei (黃晴美), who was enrolled in the University of Pittsburgh. Her brother, Peter Huang, would also enroll at the University of Pittsburgh in 1964, studying journalism. By that time, Cheng and his family were moving while he was finding a job, finally settling in 1965 near New York City working for Marcel Breuer.

== 1970 assassination attempt ==
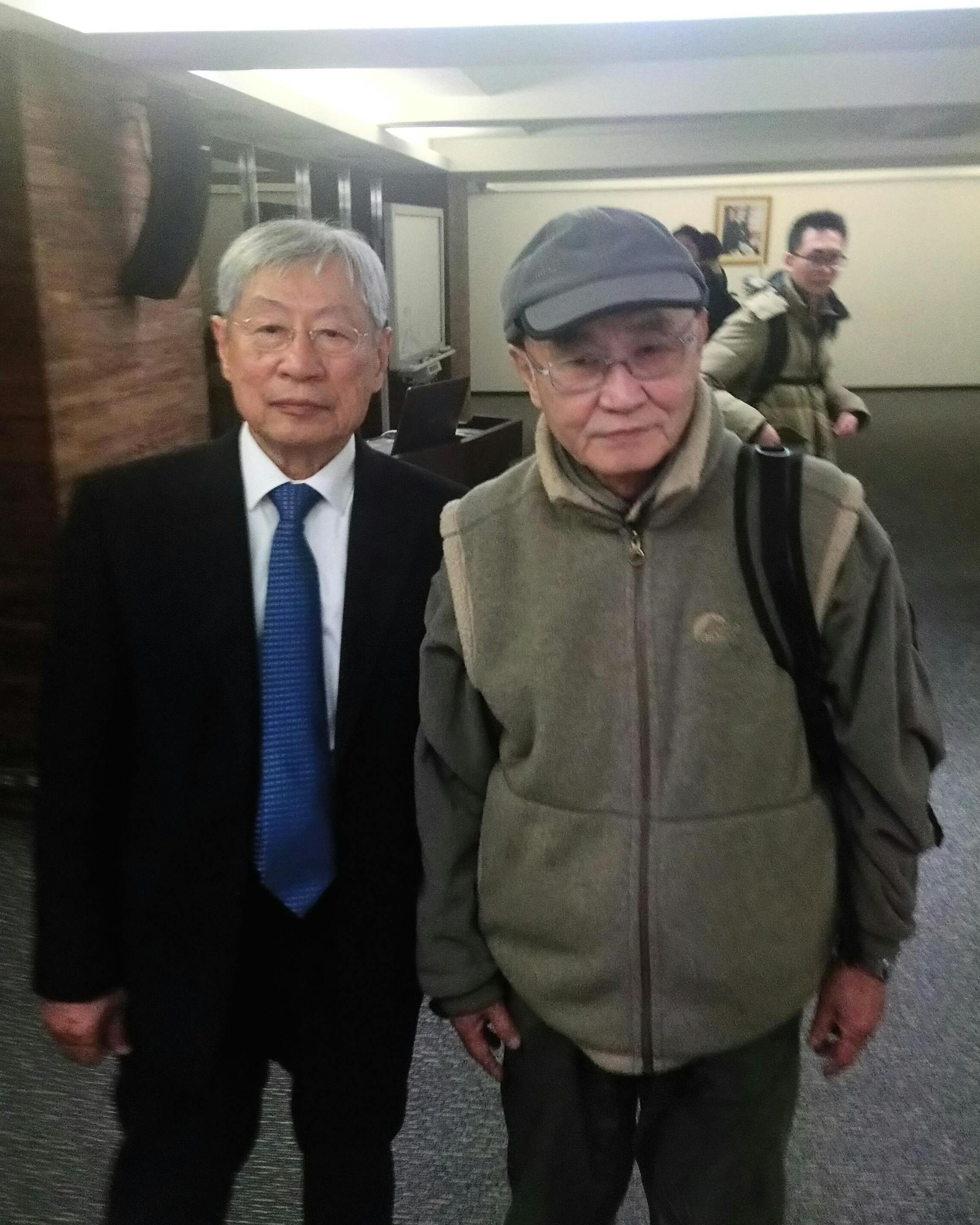
Cheng Tzu-tsai and Peter Huang in 2018

Cheng, then the secretary-general of WUFI, had conceived and organized the plot along with his brother-in-law Peter Huang, Cheng's wife Huang Ching-mei, and WUFI member Lai Wen-hsiung (賴文雄; Lài Wénxióng). On April 24, 1970, Cheng and Huang carried out the attempted assassination. Although Cheng intended to be the assassin, Huang volunteered in consideration of Cheng's wife and children. While Cheng was handing out pamphlets and shouting as a distraction, Huang approached Chiang with a gun at the Plaza Hotel, but a Diplomatic Security Service special agent pushed him out of the way, causing the bullet to strike the hotel's revolving doors. Cheng hurried to Huang's side once the gun was fired, and both men were arrested.

WUFI later issued a statement disclaiming involvement. Huang pleaded guilty in a 1971 trial to charges of attempted murder and illegal possession of a firearm, but was granted bail before sentencing, and fled the United States. Cheng pleaded innocent to attempted murder, but was convicted after a WUFI colleague testified he had given the weapon to Cheng.

Cheng also jumped bail in 1971 just before his conviction, fleeing to Sweden for asylum, but was extradited to the US a year later in 1972. Cheng fought the extradition attempt with a hunger strike, but was loaded while characterized as "semi-conscious" on the flight from Stockholm to New York. That flight was diverted to Copenhagen when the plane developed mechanical issues, and Cheng was taken to the hospital after falling unconscious to receive intravenous fluids. After a second flight from Copenhagen to London, Cheng again fell unconscious, where he was taken, foaming at the mouth, to the health center in Heathrow Airport. He was later moved to a prison hospital. Cheng applied for a writ of habeas corpus while he was detained in the United Kingdom, but this was refused in 1972 and an appeal was denied in 1973. Upon returning to the United States, Cheng was sentenced to up to five years in prison and spent 22 months in jail.

== After 1973 ==
Cheng was released from prison at the end of 1974 and returned to Sweden, living there for more than eight years, and later lived in Canada for eight more years. He divorced his first wife and remarried Ellen Wu (吳清桂; Wú Qīngguì) in the 1970s while living in exile in Sweden.

Cheng returned to Taiwan in June 1991 to attend his father's funeral. He later served an additional year-long prison term starting in November 1992 for illegally entering Taiwan without an entry visa, in violation of the 1987 National Security Law. He filed the winning design for the 228 Massacre Monument in 228 Peace Memorial Park while imprisoned for illegal entry. In 2019, Cheng founded the Sovereign State for Formosa and Pescadores Party. He served as the party's chairman. Cheng ran as a third-party candidate in the 2024 Taiwanese presidential election, alongside running mate Huang Sheng-feng. Cheng's campaign ended in November 2023, as he only recorded 473 valid signatures of at least 289,667 required signatures, or 1.5 percent of all eligible voters in the 2020 presidential election, to be considered for the 2024 ballot. In September 2024, the Taiwanese justice ministry overturned Cheng's conviction for illegal entry into Taiwan. In March 2025, he applied for compensation amounting to NT$1.825 million over his detention under the Act on Promoting Transitional Justice dealing with abuses committed under the pre-1992 Kuomintang regime.
