= Tang Bi-a =

Taiwanese politician

- 唐碧娥

Personal details
- Born: May 3, 1960 (age 66) Tainan, Taiwan
- Party: Democratic Progressive Party
- Education: Utsunomiya University

Tang Bi-a (Chinese: 唐碧娥; pinyin: Táng Bì'é; Pe̍h-ōe-jī: Tông Phek-ngô͘; born 3 May 1960) is a Taiwanese politician and former member of the Legislative Yuan. Tang is a supporter of the Taiwanese localization movement.

== Education ==
Tang was educated at Hsin-Nan Primary School, Chin-Cheng Junior High School, and Chang-Jung High School. After high school, she was educated at Utsunomiya University in Japan.

== Legislative career ==
During her legislative career, Tang expressed her distaste for China by encouraging the boycott of Chinese products, in response to China's blockage of Taiwan's bid to join the World Health Assembly.

She joined President Chen Shui-bian's entourage for a Central America summit in 2007. Having been elected three times as legislator, Tang is an experienced member of the Democratic Progressive Party.

In November 2010, Tang was elected city councilor of Tainan, which is a special municipality after a merger between the provincial Tainan City and Tainan County.

In 2022, Tang chose not to seek re-election.

== Personal life ==
Tang speaks Japanese fluently.
