= Ng Chiau-tong =

Taiwanese politician

- 黃昭堂
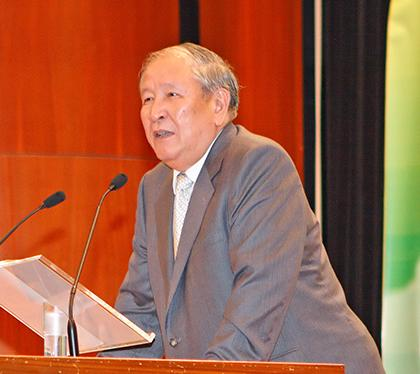
- Born: 21 September 1932; Tainan Prefecture, Japanese Taiwan
- Died: 17 November 2011 (aged 79); National Taiwan University Hospital, Taipei, Taiwan
- Education: National Taiwan University (BA); Tokyo Imperial University (MA)

Ng Chiau-tong (Chinese: 黃昭堂; pinyin: Huáng Zhāotáng; Pe̍h-ōe-jī: N̂g Chiau-tông; 21 September 1932 – 17 November 2011) was a Taiwanese pro-independence activist who served as the chairman of the World United Formosans for Independence (WUFI) until his death in 2011.

== Early life ==
Ng was born in Tainan Prefecture, Japanese Taiwan (modern-day Tainan, Taiwan) in 1932. He graduated from National Taiwan University in 1958 before moving to Japan, where he obtained a master's degree from Tokyo Imperial University. He participated in his first pro-Taiwanese independence demonstration while in Tokyo while studying for his master's degree. Several of Ng's publications and works related to his Taiwan independence advocacy bear the name Ng Yuzin Chiautong. He chose the name to honor his deceased elder brother, Ng Yuzin.

In 1960, Ng established the Taiwan Youth Society in Tokyo, which later became a branch of the World United Formosans for Independence in Japan. His pro-independence activism in Japan lead to a blacklist by the Kuomintang, which governed the Republic of China (Taiwan) at the time. The Kuomintang banned Ng from returning to Taiwan.

Ng was finally permitted to return to Taiwan from exile in 1992 by the Lee Teng-hui administration. He became Chairman of the World United Formosans for Independence in 1995 and held the position until his death in 2011. He served as a presidential adviser to Chen Shui-bian. Ng helped organize the February 28, 2004 hand-in-hand rally, in which one million Taiwanese joined in a human chain along the west coast of Taiwan from Keelung to Eluanbi, which was seen as a key event in President Chen Shui-bian's 2004 re-election campaign.

Ng's support for Taiwanese independence remained steadfast throughout his life, though his political position drifted as he aged. He originally advocated for what he called "swift independence" and the completed removal of the Republic of China government placed on the island by Chiang Kai-shek following end of World War II and the 1949 Chinese Revolution.

Later, Ng promoted a more gradual dissolution of the Republic of China's political infrastructure through consensus, "The ROC is like a cap on the top of our head. If it’s rainy, we’ll have to wear it for now, but we are waiting for a sunny day to take it off...I am very optimistic. The Taiwan independence movement will succeed someday."

== Death ==
Ng Chiau-tong suffered a heart attack while undergoing routine sinus surgery at Koo Foundation Sun Yat-Sen Cancer Center in Taipei. He was taken to National Taiwan University Hospital (NTU), where he died at approximately 11:00 a.m. on 17 November 2011, at the age of 79.

The leader of the Democratic Progressive Party (DPP), Tsai Ing-wen told reporters, "The Democratic Progressive Party was grief-stricken to learn about Ng’s passing. He has devoted his whole life to Taiwan’s democracy and freedom and his spirit will live with us forever and call on us to fight for the well-being of the next generation. May he rest in peace." Historian Lee Yeng-chyh also called Ng's unexpected death, "great loss for the Taiwan independence movement."

A park named for Ng began construction in April 2017. It opened to the public in September 2018.
