= Peter Huang =

Taiwanese activist for democratization and human rights

- 黃文雄
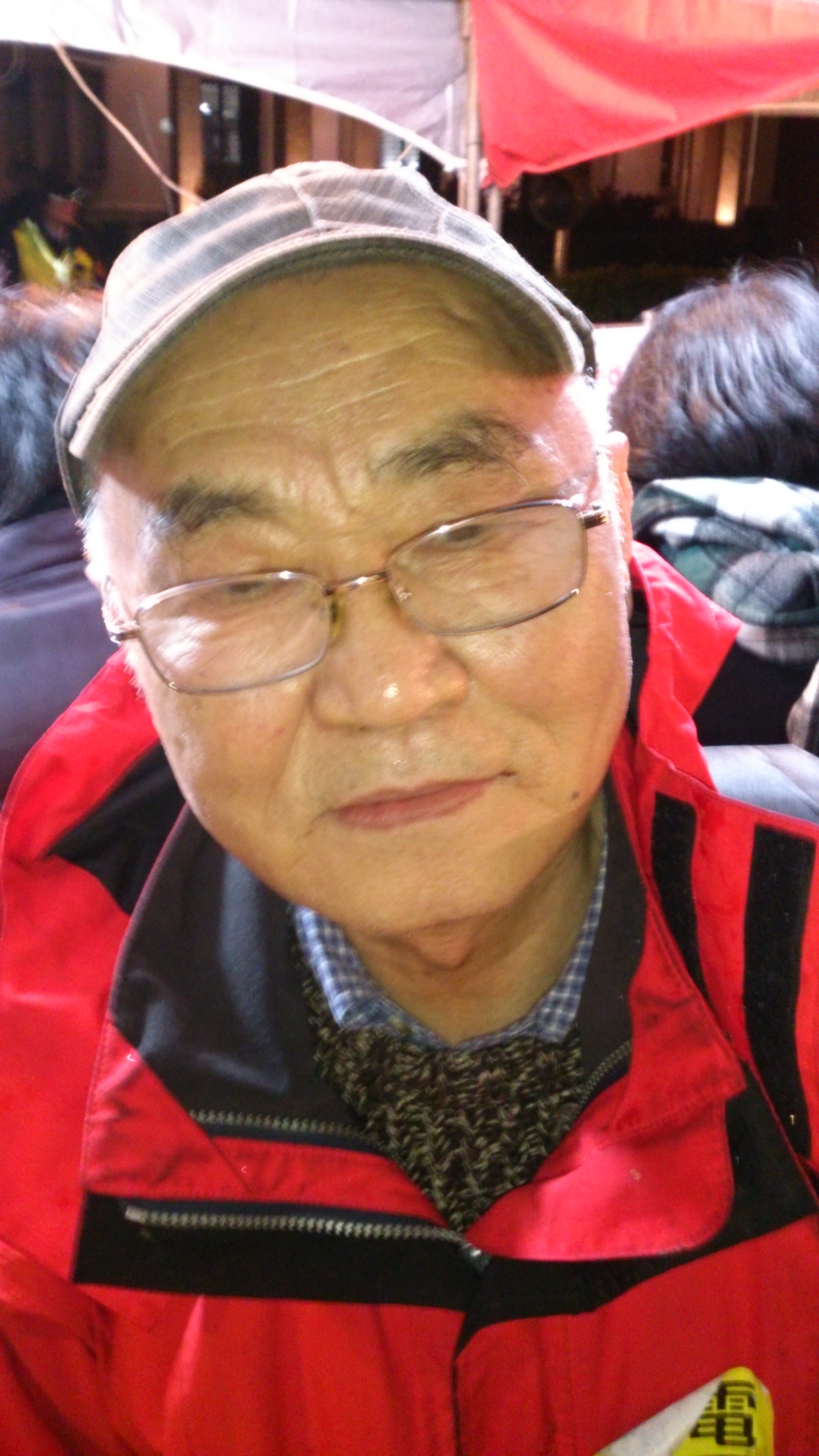
- Peter Huang at Ketagalan Boulevard, March 2014
- Born: October 2, 1937 (age 88); Shinchiku City, Shinchiku Prefecture, Japanese-ruled Taiwan (modern-day Hsinchu)
- Education: National Chengchi University (BA); University of Pittsburgh (MA); Cornell University (PhD)
- Occupation: Pro-democracy activist

Chinese name
- Traditional Chinese: 黃文雄
Transcriptions
Standard Mandarin
- Hanyu Pinyin: Huáng Wénxióng
Southern Min
- Hokkien POJ: N̂g Bûn-hiông

Peter Wen-shiung Huang (Chinese: 黃文雄; pinyin: Huáng Wénxióng; Pe̍h-ōe-jī: N̂g Bûn-hiông, also known as Peter Ng; born 2 October 1937) is a Taiwanese activist for democratization and human rights.

== Education ==
Huang majored in journalism at the National Chengchi University in Taipei and then served in the military for two years. In 1964, he applied to the graduate program in sociology at the University of Pittsburgh and earned a master's degree there. He then went to complete doctoral studies at Cornell University in 1966 and earned his Ph.D. in sociology.

== Assassination attempt ==
On April 24, 1970, Huang and his brother-in-law, Cheng Tzu-tsai, both members of the World United Formosans for Independence, were involved in the assassination attempt of then-Vice Premier Chiang Ching-kuo (Chiang Kai-shek's son) in New York City. Huang approached Chiang with a gun at the Plaza Hotel, but a Diplomatic Security Service special agent pushed him out of the way, causing the bullet to strike the hotel's revolving doors. The World United Formosans for Independence later issued a statement disclaiming involvement. He pleaded guilty in a 1971 trial to charges of attempted murder and illegal possession of a firearm, but was granted bail before sentencing, and fled the United States. Cheng Tzu-tsai also jumped bail in 1971 after his conviction, fleeing to Sweden for asylum, but was extradited to the US in 1972, sentenced in 1973 to up to five years in prison and later served an additional prison term in Taiwan for illegal entry.

Huang viewed his assassination attempt as an act of opposition to the United States war in Vietnam and as an anti-imperialist action, as he deemed the Taiwan government as an "accomplice of Washington."

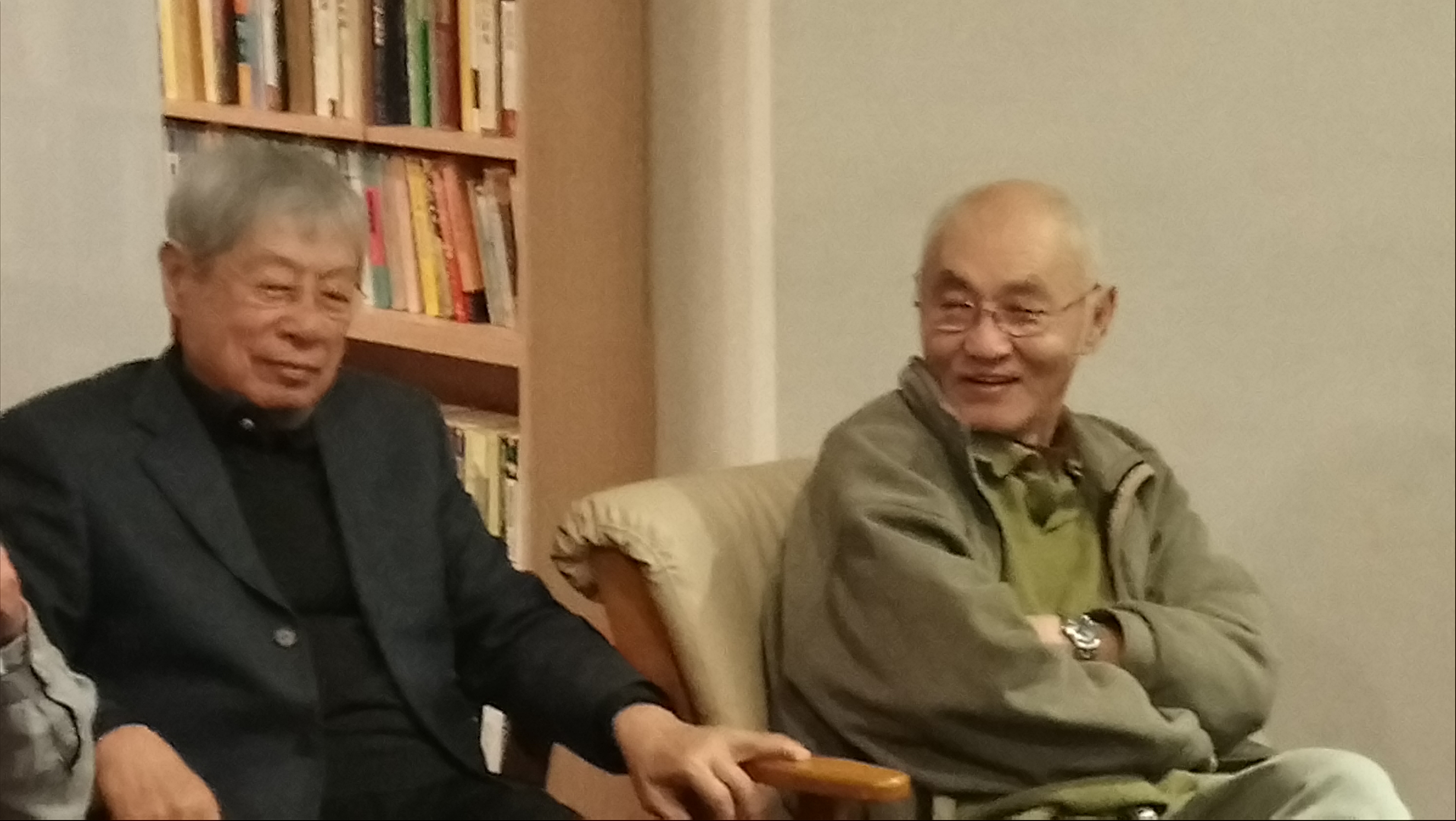
Cheng Tzu-tsai and Peter Huang in 2018

== Aftermath ==
Huang's action is considered a stimulus for political reform in Taiwan, which promotes the role of Taiwanese people in the political arena. He was in hiding for 25 years, returning to Taiwan in 1996, after Taiwan's statute of limitations had run out on further prosecution for the assassination attempt as one of the last persons who had not been permitted to return to Taiwan for political reasons. Huang was prosecuted and served four months in jail for violating the 1987 National Security Law for illegal entry, since he did not have an entry visa when he returned to Taiwan in 1996.

In 1998, Huang became the director of the Taiwan Association for Human Rights. In 2000, he was appointed as National Policy Advisor to the President for human rights issues. He is also an avid supporter of the Green Party Taiwan since its founding. Huang led Amnesty International Taiwan from 2009 through 2013. In 2012, he was given an Alumni Excellence Award by the National Chengchi University for his lifelong commitment to democracy, freedom, and social movements.

Huang shouted “Let me stand up like a Taiwanese!” upon being arrested after the failed assassination attempt. This phrase was later referenced in the song title (無名英雄 Stand Up Like A Taiwanese) by rock band Fire EX., as well as repeated several times at the end of the heavy metal song “Supreme Pain for the Tyrant” by Chthonic.

== See also ==
- Taiwan independence movement
- Human rights in Taiwan
- Resistance movement
- Civil disobedience
