= Mayor of Tainan =

Head of Tainan, Taiwan

Mayor of the City of Tainan
- Flag of Tainan

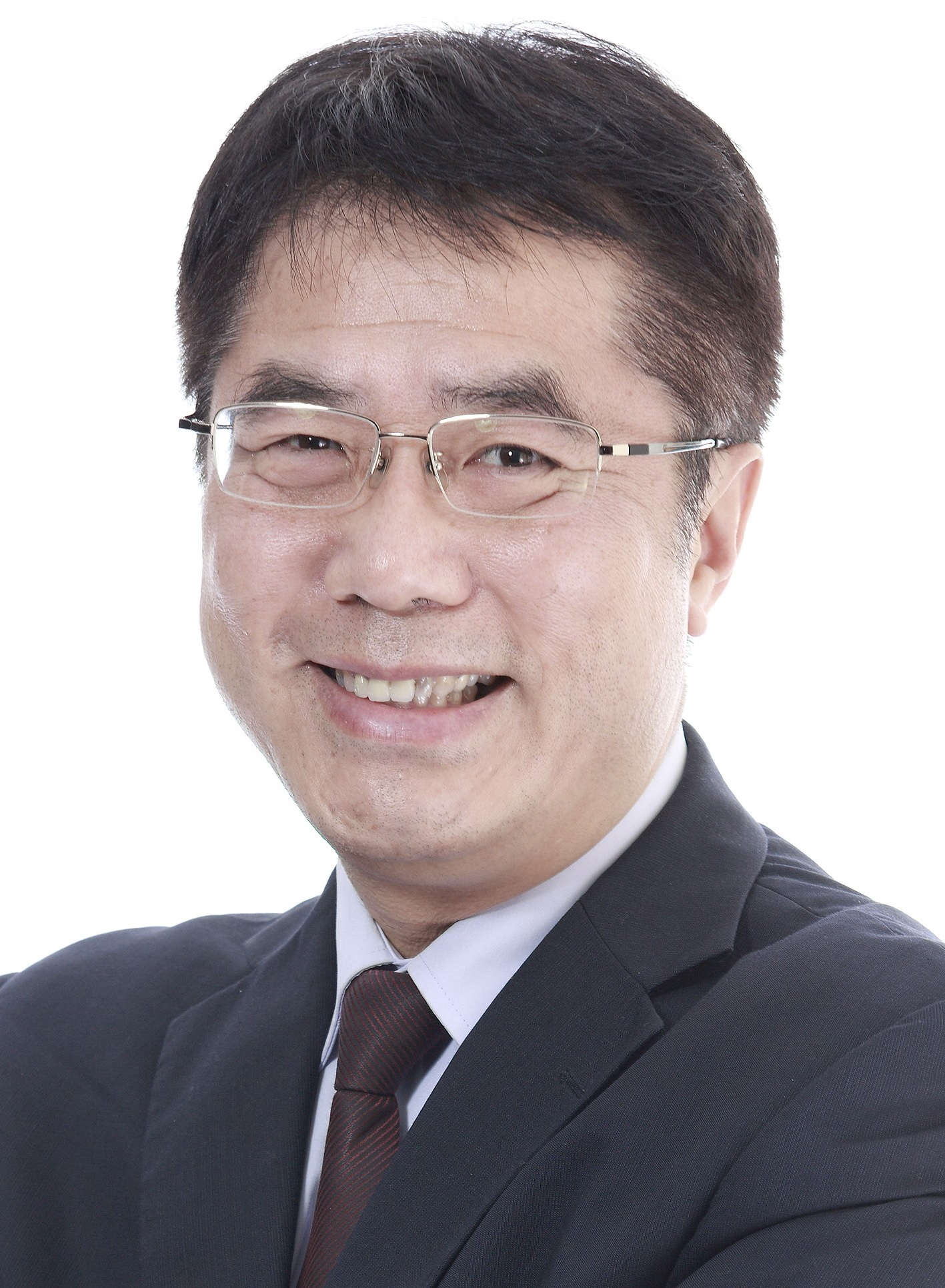
- Incumbent; Huang Wei-che since 25 December 2018
- Term length: four years; may serve 1 consecutive terms

The Mayor of Tainan is the head of the Tainan City Government, Taiwan and is elected to a four-year term. The current mayor is Huang Wei-cher of the Democratic Progressive Party since 25 December 2018.

== Titles of the Mayor ==
Date	English	Characters	Japanese	Mandarin	Taiwanese	Hakka
Oct 1920–Oct 1940	Mayor of Tainan	臺南市市尹	Tainan-shi Shiin		Tâi-lâm-chhī Chhī-ún	Thòi-nàm-sṳ Sṳ-yún
Oct 1940–Oct 1945	Mayor of Tainan	臺南市市長	Tainan-shi Shichō		Tâi-lâm-chhī; Chhī-tiúⁿ	Thòi-nàm-sṳ; Sṳ-chhòng
Oct 1945–present	Mayor of Tainan	臺南市市長		Táinán Shì Shìzhǎng	Tâi-lâm-chhī; Chhī-tiúⁿ	Thòi-nàm-sṳ; Sṳ-chhòng

== List of Mayors ==
This list includes only those persons who served as mayors of Tainan City after the end of World War II, during the Post-War era of Taiwan. The first two mayors served were appointed by the central government of the Republic of China (Taiwan).

The numerals indicate the consecutive time in office served by a single elected mayor. For example, Su Nan-cheng served two consecutive terms and is counted as the tenth mayor (not the eighth and ninth). Yeh Ting-kuei served three non-consecutive terms and is counted chronologically as the 3rd, the 5th, and the 7th mayor. Because of this, the list below contains 14 mayoralties, but only 12 people.

Kuomintang Independent/ unknown Democratic Progressive Party

=== Mayor of Tainan (Provincial city) ===
==== Appointed mayors ====
№	Portrait	Name (Birth–Death)	Term of Office		Political Party
1		Han Lien-he 韓聯和; Hán Liánhé (?-?)	26 November 1945	26 August 1946	Kuomintang
2		Chuo Kao-hsuen 卓高煊; Zhuó Gāoxuān (?-?)	26 August 1946	1 February 1951	Kuomintang

==== Elected mayors ====
№	Portrait	Name (Birth–Death)	Term of Office		Term	Political Party
		Yeh Ting-kuei 葉廷珪; Yè Tíngguī (1905-1977)	1 February 1951	2 June 1954	1	Independent
3		Yeh Ting-kuei 葉廷珪; Yè Tíngguī (1905-1977)	1 February 1951	2 June 1954	1	Kuomintang
		Yeh Ting-kuei 葉廷珪; Yè Tíngguī (1905-1977)	1 February 1951	2 June 1954	1	Independent
4		Yang Ching 楊請; Yáng Qǐng (1906–1971)	2 June 1954	2 June 1957	2	Kuomintang
5		Yeh Ting-kuei 葉廷珪; Yè Tíngguī (1905-1977)	2 June 1957	2 June 1960	3	Independent
6		Hsin Wen-bing 辛文炳; Xīn Wénbǐng (1912–1999)	2 June 1960	2 June 1964	4	Kuomintang
7		Yeh Ting-kuei 葉廷珪; Yè Tíngguī (1905-1977)	2 June 1964	2 June 1968	5	Independent
		Yeh Ting-kuei 葉廷珪; Yè Tíngguī (1905-1977)	2 June 1964	2 June 1968	5	Kuomintang
8		Lin Hsi-shan 林錫山; Lín Xíshān (1928–?)	2 June 1968	1 February 1973	6	Kuomintang
9		Chang Li-tang 張麗堂; Zhāng Lìtáng (1935–)	1 February 1973	20 December 1977	7	Kuomintang
10		Su Nan-cheng 蘇南成; Sū Nánchéng (1936–2014)	20 December 1977	20 December 1981	8	Independent
10		Su Nan-cheng 蘇南成; Sū Nánchéng (1936–2014)	20 December 1981	30 May 1985	9	Independent
		Su Nan-cheng 蘇南成; Sū Nánchéng (1936–2014)	20 December 1981	30 May 1985	9	Kuomintang
—		Chen Kuei-miao 陳癸淼; Chén Guǐmiǎo (1934–2014)	30 May 1985	20 December 1985	9	Kuomintang
11		Lin Wen-hsiung 林文雄; Lín Wénxióng (1942–)	20 December 1985	20 December 1989	10	Kuomintang
12		Shih Chih-ming 施治明; Shī Zhìmíng (1952–)	20 December 1989	20 December 1993	11	Kuomintang
12		Shih Chih-ming 施治明; Shī Zhìmíng (1952–)	20 December 1993	20 December 1997	12	Kuomintang
13		George Chang 張燦鍙; Zhāng Cànhòng (1936–)	20 December 1997	20 December 2001	13	Democratic Progressive Party
		George Chang 張燦鍙; Zhāng Cànhòng (1936–)	20 December 1997	20 December 2001	13	Independent
14		Hsu Tain-tsair 許添財; Xǔ Tiāncái (1951–)	20 December 2001	20 December 2005	14	Democratic Progressive Party
14		Hsu Tain-tsair 許添財; Xǔ Tiāncái (1951–)	20 December 2005	25 December 2010	15	Democratic Progressive Party

=== Mayor of Tainan (Special municipality) ===
№	Portrait	Name (Birth–Death)	Term of Office		Term	Political Party
1		Lai Ching-te (William Lai) 賴清德; Lài Qīngdé (1958–)	25 December 2010 25 December 2014	25 December 2014 7 September 2017	1	Democratic Progressive Party
—		Li Meng-yen 李孟諺; Lǐ Mèngyàn (1966–)	8 September 2017	25 December 2018	2	Independent
2		Huang Wei-che 黃偉哲; Huáng Wěizhé (1963–)	25 December 2018	25 December 2022	3	Democratic Progressive Party
2		Huang Wei-che 黃偉哲; Huáng Wěizhé (1963–)	25 December 2022	Incumbent	4	Democratic Progressive Party

== See also ==
- Tainan City Government
- Tainan City Council
- Tainan City
