= World United Formosans for Independence =

Organization promoting Taiwan independence

- Traditional Chinese: 臺灣獨立建國聯盟
- Simplified Chinese: 台湾独立建国联盟
Transcriptions
Standard Mandarin
- Hanyu Pinyin: Táiwān dúlì jiànguó liánméng
Southern Min
- Hokkien POJ: Tâi-oân To̍k-li̍p Kiàn-kok Liân-bêng

The World United Formosans for Independence (WUFI) is an organization promoting Taiwan independence. It was established in 1970 by like-minded organizations in Canada, the U.S., Japan, Europe, South America and Taiwan. Its aim is to establish a Republic of Taiwan.

Pro-independence activist Ng Chiau-tong, who served as the Chairman of the WUFI from 1995 until 2011, died in office from complications of surgery on 17 November 2011.

The current chairman is of the organisation is Richard Chen (陳南天)

== History ==
=== 1940s and 1950s ===
On 28 February 1947, the 228 Massacre took place in Taiwan. Within 3 years of the incident Taiwanese oversea exiles Thomas Liao and Chen Chih-hsiung established the Taiwan Democratic Independence Party in Japan, and later led the Republic of Taiwan Provisional Government.

In 1950, some Taiwanese left Formosa organized and published “Taiwanese Youth monthly” started to organize young Taiwanese independence activists. The reasons were not all political. The Nationalist Chinese had a land reform to buy excess land not tilled by the landowners and sold them to farmers at zero interest. Those who received stock certificates in compensation were not pleased with the exchange. Banning the use of Japanese in public also caused inconvenience to many Taiwanese who were educated in Japanese under colonial rule. The Japanese officials were mostly honest following a more rigid standards.

In 1954, Taiwanese American students (Jay Loo, John Lin, Edward Chen, Ton-ket Young) organized 3F (Free Formosa for Formosans) in Philadelphia. In a few years 3F was reorganized as UFI (United Formosans for Independence).

=== 1960s ===
In 1964, National Taiwan University Political Science Department professor Peng Ming-min and two students (Hsieh Tsung-min and Wei Ting-chao) in Taiwan's highly controlled society, secretly established a Declaration of Formosan Self-Salvation. (Also known as Taiwan's declaration of independence) Though, it was not successful and all three were arrested. They often challenged the National Chinese Government legitimacy which moved from China to escape communists.

In 1965, the KMT eventually forced Thomas Liao and the leaders of the Republic of Taiwan Provisional Government to surrender to the KMT after they tortured and imprisoned his family in Taiwan. The overseas Taiwanese movement was not affected by his surrender. The KMT efforts to force Thomas Liao to give in caused resentments to strive harder for their goal.

Dr. and Mrs. Chou organized Taiwan study group in University of Wisconsin–Madison. They organized a solidarity meeting for Taiwanese Americans in 1965. The meeting decided to form UFI to be a more effective organization for the purpose of achieving Taiwan independence.

In 1966, United Formosans in America for Independence (UFAI) campus center grassroots revolution.

A reorganization of UFI was initiated in January 1966 and formally launched in June 1966. The new reorganized organization was named as UFAI (United Formosans in America for Independence). UFAI members kept up the struggle for Taiwan independence and were encouraged by George H. Kerr's book Formosa Betrayed, also published in 1965. They were also inspired by the anti-Vietnam war movement on US college campuses and the Taiwanese student movement to protect Tiao-yu-tai Island against Japan. They were especially encouraged by the news of Dr. Peng Ming-min escaping from Taiwan and appearing in Sweden.

They were also inspired by the successful story of the Cuban revolution a decade ago. Cuba, like Taiwan, was also an island nation that was controlled by the Bautista dictatorship in a similar manner that Chiang Kai-shek's dictatorship controlled Taiwan. The Cuban revolution was sparked by 80 idealists who trained to be military guerillas to free Cuba after landing on the Sierra Madre Mountains. Almost all of the idealists died when they made it to the top but rather than surrendering, they made a radio announcement at top of the mountain that the army to free Cuba had arrived. UFAI members seek to follow the same model and trained to be revolutionary guerrillas to free Taiwan from the Chiang Kai-shek government with similar tactics.

UFAI was the first grassroots overseas Taiwanese independence organization dedicated to revolutionary change in Taiwan. Their three basic principles:

1. Promote Taiwan Independence ideology
2. Take effective action
3. Grow strong organizations

The first UFAI meeting was held in June 1966 at Independence, Missouri. It was decided there that they would meet every two years.

In 1967, Francis Tiu (Chong kui hen) became a full time activist to work for Taiwan Independence and work for UFAI as a dedicated activist. He currently resides in Sweden.

In 1969, the Summer UFAI meeting in Hammond, IN, took place.

=== 1970s ===
In April, 1970, UFAI member Peter Huang from Cornell University made an assassination attempt on Chiang Ching-kuo who had been invited to a luncheon in New York City. Huang fired a pistol at Chiang but failed to cause injury. Huang was arrested and pled guilty; his accompliice Cheng Tzu-tsai fled to Sweden where he was extradited back to the U.S.

In December, the World United Formosans for Independence (WUFI) was officially inaugurated in New York city.

In January, 1971, WUFI announced their declaration to struggle for Taiwan independence. Among attendees were George Chang, Trong Chai, Lo hok-tsuan, Kyu Bun-ki, Strong Chuang, Wang Po-wen. A decision was made to start publishing monthly newsletter titled "Taiwan Independence".

In NYC several WUFI members chained themselves at the United Nations headquarter demanding human rights in Taiwan.

In June, WUFI organized their first secret meeting at Denison University with roughly 90 people in attendance. Two people, Clyde Kiang and Tom Tseng, did not attend since they could not decipher the secret code.

At Little League World series held in Williamsport, the activists group hired an air plane to fly a banner. Pro KMT group took Taiwan flags away while in fights against some Taiwan Independence supporters.

WUFI had a campaign to send clandestine Taiwan Independence messages to Taiwan from 1971 to 1975. The Taiwan Independence symbol was the triangle over the circle.

In 1979, the Kaohsiung incident took place.

=== 1980s ===
After the Kaoshiung incident took place, the murder of Lin Yi-siung's family took place on February 28, 1980. This energized the overseas Taiwanese community to fundraise for the movement in Taiwan. In 1980, the Taiwan Tribune started to be published and circulated among the Taiwan Independence supporters. Regional Taiwanese conferences that were organized all across North America would invite speakers and fundraise to support the movement in Taiwan. Efforts to organize the community to lobby the US and Canadian governments were started with earnest.

A series of bombings of KMT offices and officials in the United States from 1979 to 1980 resulted in the Department of Justice adding WUFI to its list of terrorist organizations in May 1980. These bombings were performed after the Formosa incident in 1979 when the Kuomintang arrested a generation of Taiwanese democracy activists. These actions were to serve as a warning to the KMT to not harm the Formosa Incident activists who were arrested in 1979.

In 1984, Taiwanese underground figures came to California murder Chinese-American author Henry Liu. Liu was not an activist. Rather the Taiwan government was sensitive about writing revealing things they wish to protect. The book is available offering little new information.

In 1988, the World Taiwanese conference was to be held in Taiwan. WUFI members sought to attend this conference and convince Taiwanese people that the supporters for Taiwan independence are people who seek to serve Taiwan's best interests.

=== 1990s ===
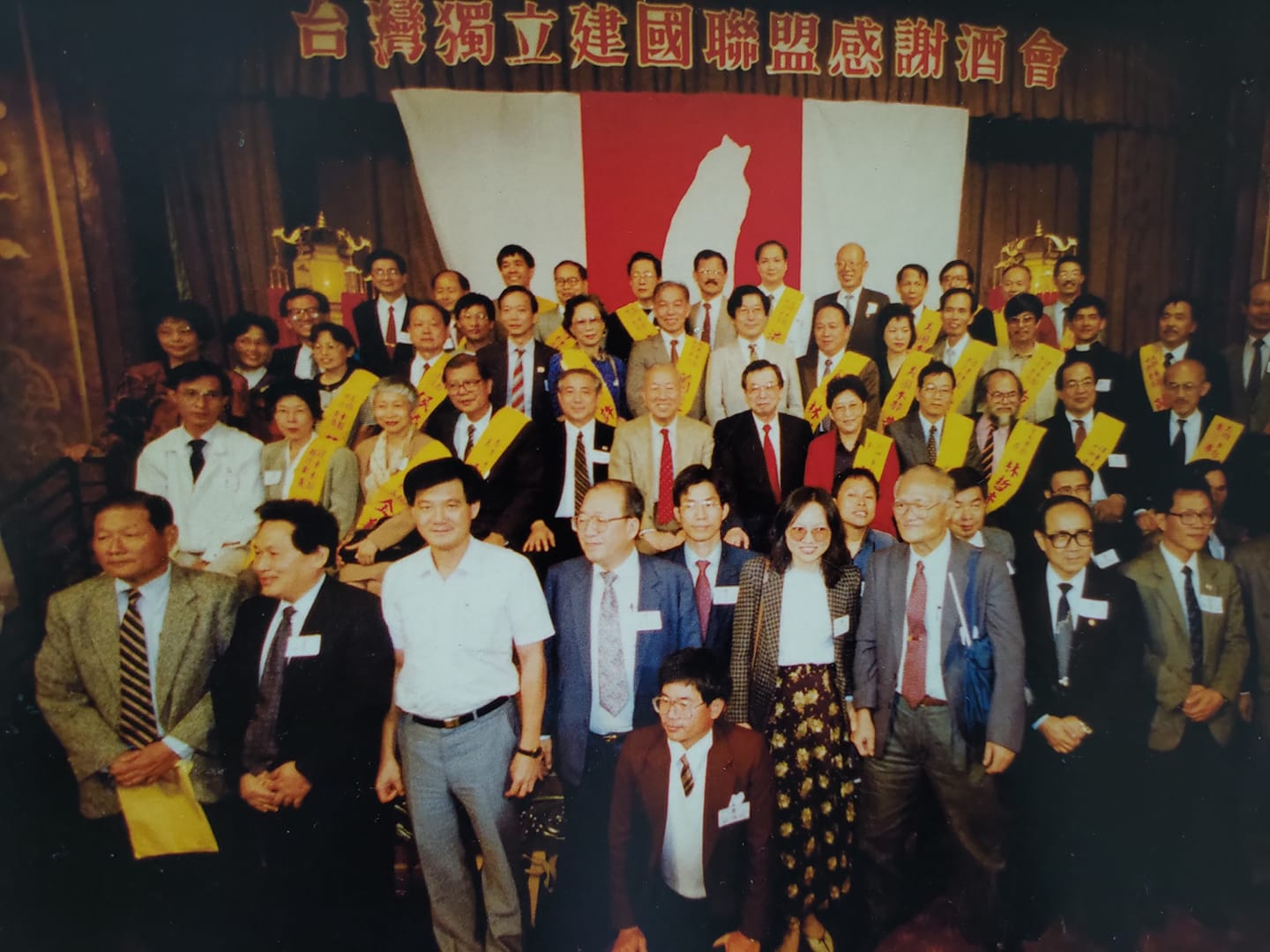
1991 WUFI Celebration dinner honoring activists who were imprisoned along with overseas members who were blacklisted by the KMT from returning to Taiwan

Since WUFI was founded in 1971, the above ground leadership was an overseas Taiwanese movement since to publicly support Taiwan independence in Taiwan would cause immediate arrest and imprisonment. In 1990, the overseas Taiwanese independence movement decided to make a concerted effort to challenge the blacklist and move their leadership back to Taiwan. In 1991, many of the WUFI leaders who went back to Taiwan were arrested and imprisoned. The overseas WUFI members and supporters organized solidarity protests to pressure Taiwan.

== Blacklist ==
Overseas Taiwanese human rights and independence activists faced retribution from the KMT government in Taiwan. Almost all active members of WUFI were blacklisted and unable to return to visit their family in Taiwan. Some were blacklisted since the 1960s. The blacklist was finally lifted in 1993.
