= Yen Teh-fa =

Taiwanese politician

- 嚴德發
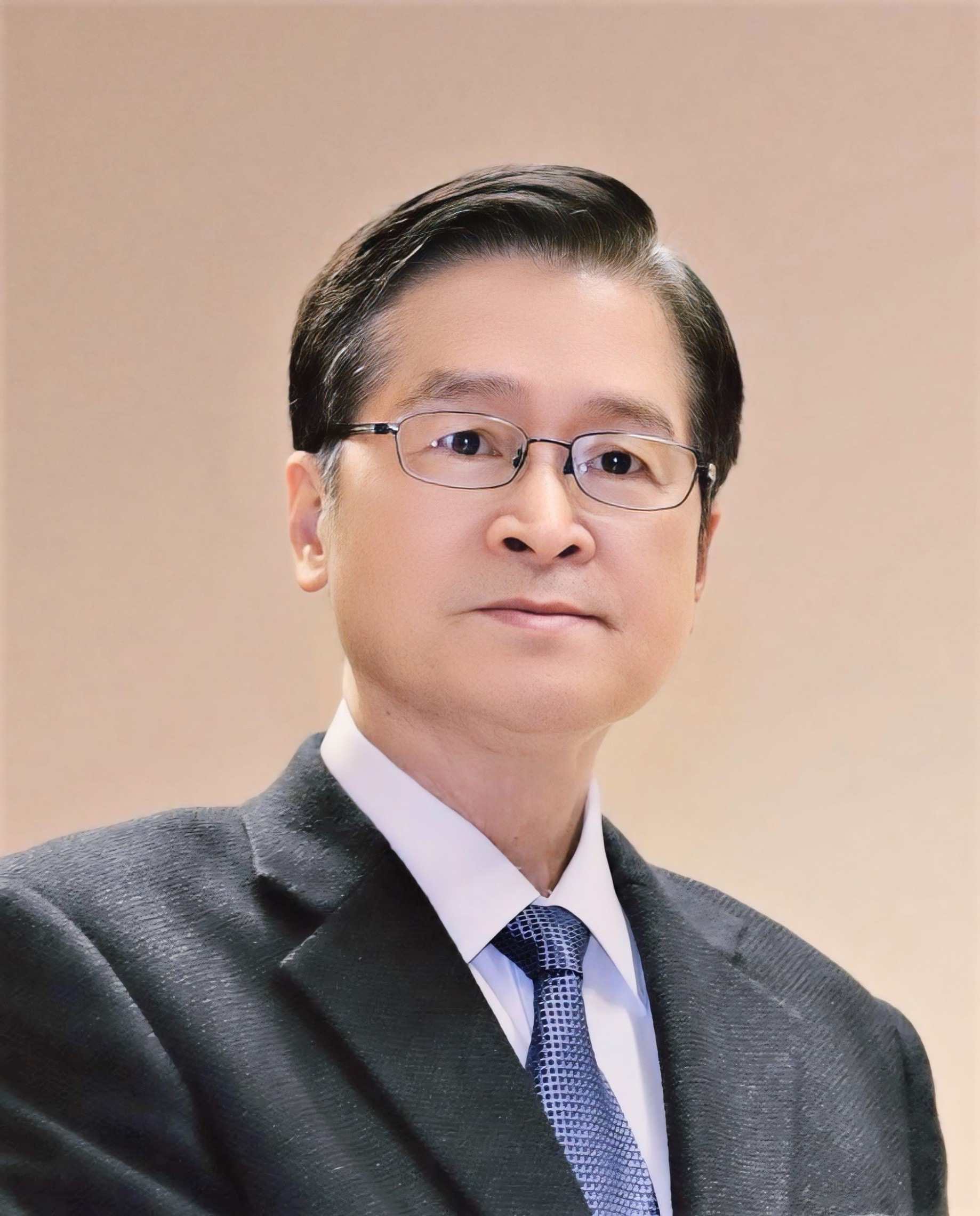
- Official portrait, 2024

5th Minister of Veterans Affairs
- Incumbent
- Assumed office 20 May 2024
- Prime Minister: Cho Jung-tai
- Preceded by: Feng Shih-kuan

Member of the National Security Council
- In office 23 February 2021 – 20 May 2024
- President: Tsai Ing-wen
- In office 16 January 2017 – 23 May 2017
- President: Tsai Ing-wen

33rd Minister of National Defense
- In office 26 February 2018 – 23 February 2021
- Prime Minister: William Lai; Su Tseng-chang
- Vice Minister: See list: Shen Yi-ming Chang Guan-chung
- Preceded by: Feng Shih-kuan
- Succeeded by: Chiu Kuo-cheng

20th Secretary-General of the National Security Council
- In office 18 May 2017 – 26 February 2018
- President: Tsai Ing-wen
- Deputy: Tsai Ming-yen
- Preceded by: Joseph Wu
- Succeeded by: David Lee

24th Chief of the General Staff of the ROC Armed Forces
- In office 30 January 2015 – 30 November 2016
- Deputy: Pu Tze-chun
- Preceded by: Kao Kuang-chi
- Succeeded by: Chiu Kuo-cheng

5th Commander of the ROC Army
- In office 16 January 2014 – 29 January 2015
- Preceded by: Lee Shying-jow
- Succeeded by: Chiu Kuo-cheng

7th Vice Minister of Armaments of National Defense
- In office 16 August 2013 – 15 January 2014
- Minister: Yen Ming
- Preceded by: Kao Kuang-chi
- Succeeded by: Lee Shying-jow

Personal details
- Born: 14 November 1952 (age 73) Cianjhen, Kaohsiung, Taiwan
- Party: Independent
- Spouse: Chu Tai-ying
- Relatives: Yen Teh-tsai (brother)
- Education: Republic of China Military Academy (BA); Tri-service University
- Nickname: "Brother Fa"

Military service
- Allegiance: Republic of China
- Branch/service: Republic of China Army
- Years of service: 1975–2016
- Rank: General
- Commands: 8th Army Corps
- Battles/wars: Typhoon Morakot

Yen Teh-fa (traditional Chinese: 嚴德發; simplified Chinese: 严德发; pinyin: Yán Défā; born 14 November 1952) is a Taiwanese politician and retired general of the ROC Army who has served as the minister of the Veterans Affairs Council since 2024. His ancestral home was in Nanjing. He was previously the Minister of National Defense and the secretary-general of the National Security Council. He was the chief of the general staff of the ROC armed forces from 30 January 2015 until 1 December 2016. He was the vice minister for armaments of the National Defense Ministry (MND) from 9 August 2013 until 15 January 2014.

== Education ==
Yen graduated from the Republic of China Military Academy in 1975 and later graduated from the War College of the National Defense University in 1978.

== Military career ==
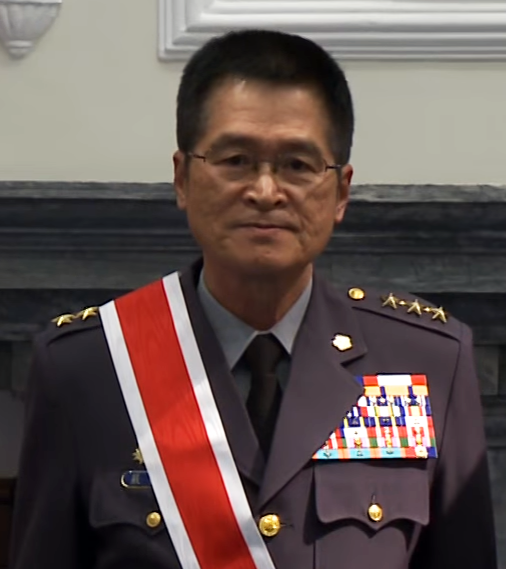
Upon retirement in 2016, Yen was awarded the Order of the Cloud and Banner.

In August 2009, Yen joined the disaster relief efforts under the 8th Army Corps following the Typhoon Morakot.

In August 2013, Yen was named the vice minister of defense for armaments. He left the post in January 2014, and was appointed the chief of the general staff of the Republic of China Armed Forces. Yen retired in December 2016, and was succeeded by Chiu Kuo-cheng. In May 2017, Yen returned to public service as secretary-general of the National Security Council. In February 2018, he was named minister of national defense in place of Feng Shih-kuan. His term was extended in February 2020 due to the ROCAF UH-60M crash with high-rank officers including Chief of the General Staff, General Shen Yi-ming, deceased. In February 2021, Yen was named a consultant to the National Security Council. He formally joined the NSC on 23 February 2021.

== Legacy ==
On 6 January 2018, Yen criticized the PRC's unilateral decision to activate the north-bound airline of M503 Flight Route as unilaterally changing the status quo across the Taiwan Strait and severely impacting the peace and stability in the East Asian region.

On 29 March 2018, a lady guest to a military base posted a selfie inside the classified Boeing AH-64 Apache cabin to Facebook, which exposed the Apache Helicopter Scandal. Further investigation on the host helicopter pilot, Lieutenant-colonel Lau, revealed multiple incidents of corruption and security breaches associated with the 601 Brigade of the ROC Army Aviation and Special Forces Command, which led to 20 officers being either prosecuted or sanctioned. Yen became the first Chief of the General Staff receiving a demerit in the ROC Armed Forces history.

On 3 October 2018, MP Freddy Lim, former Director of the Amnesty International Taiwan, inquired in a hearing session of the Foreign and National Defense Committee in the Legislative Yuan for re-investigation on the Lieyu massacre files in the military archive to render an apology to the victims' families through the Vietnamese Representative Office, but Minister Yen disagreed, claiming that troops followed the "SOP" of the Martial Law to execute the orders, and had been court-martialed. Later, the MND followed up to state that "It has been too difficult to identify the deceased due to the long time, hence (the case) can not be processed further". This served as the sole statement of the government of the Republic of China on the case since martial law was lifted in 1987.
