= Feng Shih-kuan =

Taiwanese politician (born 1945)

- 馮世寬
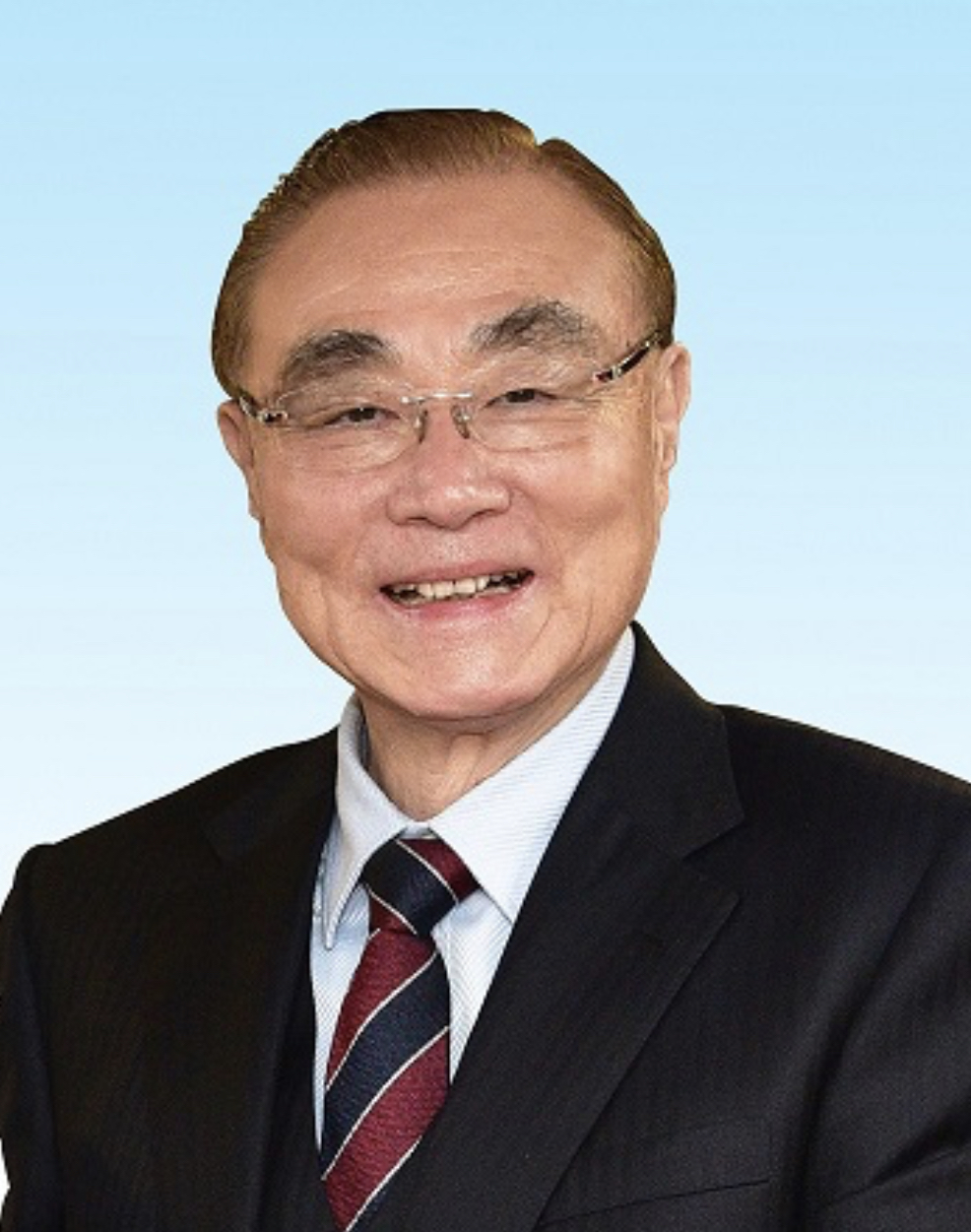
- Official portrait, 2019

4th Minister of Veterans Affairs
- In office 5 August 2019 – 20 May 2024
- Prime Minister: Su Tseng-chang; Chen Chien-jen
- Preceded by: Lee Wen-chung (acting)
- Succeeded by: Yen Teh-fa

32nd Minister of National Defense
- In office 20 May 2016 – 23 February 2018
- Prime Minister: Lin Chuan; William Lai
- Preceded by: Kao Kuang-chi
- Succeeded by: Yen Teh-fa

Personal details
- Born: 25 November 1945 (age 80) Huai-yin, Kiangsu, Republic of China
- Party: Independent
- Other political affiliations: Kuomintang (until 2016)
- Education: Republic of China Air Force Academy (BS); University of Southern California; Armed Forces University (MS)

Military service
- Branch/service: Republic of China Air Force
- Years of service: 1967－2006
- Rank: General

Feng Shih-kuan (Chinese: 馮世寬; pinyin: Féng Shìkuān; born 25 November 1945) is a Taiwanese politician. He served in the Republic of China Air Force from 1967 to 2006, retiring with the rank of General before assuming the post of Minister of National Defense in 2016. Feng stepped down in 2018 and was succeeded by Yen Teh-fa.

== Education ==
Feng completed his education at the Chinese Air Preparatory School of the Ministry of National Defense in 1963. He graduated from the Republic of China Air Force Academy in 1967. In 1977, he obtained his Flight Safety Officer Class from the University of Southern California in the United States. In 1981, he completed his study from the Armed Forces University in the Chinese Air Command and Staff College in 1981 and in the Chinese War College in 1988.

== Non-military career ==
Feng joined Aerospace Industrial Development Corporation as company chairman on 2 May 2006. He was hired to oversee the completion of upgrades to the AIDC F-CK-1 Ching-kuo, which had been ongoing for seven years and cost NT$7 billion.

== Ministry of National Defense ==
Feng was named Minister of National Defense in April 2016, a month before the Tsai Ing-wen administration was to take office. For accepting a post in a Democratic Progressive Party-led government, the Kuomintang suspended Feng's membership. Subsequently, Feng withdrew from the Kuomintang.

=== Cross–Strait relations ===
Speaking at the Foreign and National Defense Committee of the Legislative Yuan on 23 May 2016, Feng said that he would not support the Taiwan independence movement.

At 8:15 a.m. on 1 July, a Hsiung Feng III missile was inadvertently launched from a corvette docked at Zuoying Military Harbor. The strike hit the Taiwanese fishing boat Hsiang Li Sheng, killing the captain and injuring three of his crew. Feng arrived in Kaohsiung to deliver a personal apology to the fisherman's family the next day, but it was rejected. Zhang Zhijun, leader of the Taiwan Affairs Office, also asked for Taipei to adequately explain the incident, which was placed under investigation.

== Later political career ==
Feng resigned as defense minister on 23 February 2018, and was replaced by Yen Teh-fa. Subsequently, Feng was appointed the founding director of the Institute for National Defense and Security Research, established in May. On 5 August 2019, Yeh took office as minister of the Veterans Affairs Council, succeeding Chiu Kuo-cheng, who had been named director-general of the National Security Bureau.
