= Norway–Taiwan relations =

- Norway: Taiwan

Norway–Taiwan relations refer to the bilateral relations between Norway and Taiwan.

== Overview ==
Officially Norway–Taiwan relations are conducted at arm's length so as not to offend China. Since being strongly punished by the Chinese government the Norwegian government has been wary of taking any action which might be viewed negatively by the Chinese, even if it goes against their values. China had been offended by the award of the Nobel Peace Prize to Liu Xiaobo in 2010.

Norway has a One China policy.

== History ==
In 2014 Gro Harlem Brundtland was awarded the Tang Prize in sustainable development.

In 2010 the Norwegian government began listing "China" as the nationality of Taiwanese citizens instead of "Taiwan" on visas, identity cards, and other official documents. In 2018 a group of Taiwanese students studying in Norway sued the Norwegian government over the relabeling, the litigants said, "At the time, we did not receive a positive response from the Norwegian government through the diplomatic channel, so we decided to take legal action. For us, it is normal to defend our rights and interests by exercising litigation in a country with democracy and the rule of law." In 2020 the Supreme Court of Norway rejected the lawsuit on the grounds that the claimants had not demonstrated substantial damage to their wellbeing as a result of the change. The claimants then appealed the decision to the European Court of Human Rights.

In November 2020 Taiwanese Foreign Minister Joseph Wu publicly urged the Norwegian government to correct their mislabelling of Taiwanese nationals calling it a human rights violation and expressed support for the legal campaign.

== See also ==
- China–Norway relations
- Denmark–Taiwan relations
- NASAMS
