= Presidential state car (Republic of China) =

Official car of the president of the Republic of China

The presidential state car of the Republic of China (traditional Chinese: 中華民國總統座車; simplified Chinese: 中华民国总统座车; pinyin: Zhōnghuá Mínguó Zǒngtǒng Zuòchē) is the official car used by the president for official duty.

== History ==
Since the second presidential term of Chen Shui-bian in 2004, the president had been using the BMW 740Li brand. In 2016, it was switched to Audi A8L which was delivered in April 2016 ahead of the first presidential term of Tsai Ing-wen.

== Current state car ==
BMW 760i xDrive Protection (G73)

Overview
- Manufacturer: BMW

Body and chassis
- Class: Full-size luxury car (F)

Dimensions
- Curb weight: 3,965 kg (8,741 lb)

Chronology
- Predecessor: Audi A8 L 55 TFSI quattro (D5,Typ 4N)

== Specifications ==
The cars were modified with armor plates to be bulletproof.

== Cost ==
The 2016 president's car cost approximately NT$24.9 million. Nine accompanying cars procured by the National Security Bureau cost about NT$31.09 million, on an open tender won by VW Taiwan which outbid Pan German Motors, the official agent of BMW in Taiwan, by NT$3.82 million.

== See also ==
- Vice presidential state car (Republic of China)
