= Chiu Kuo-cheng =

Taiwanese politician and retired general

- 邱國正
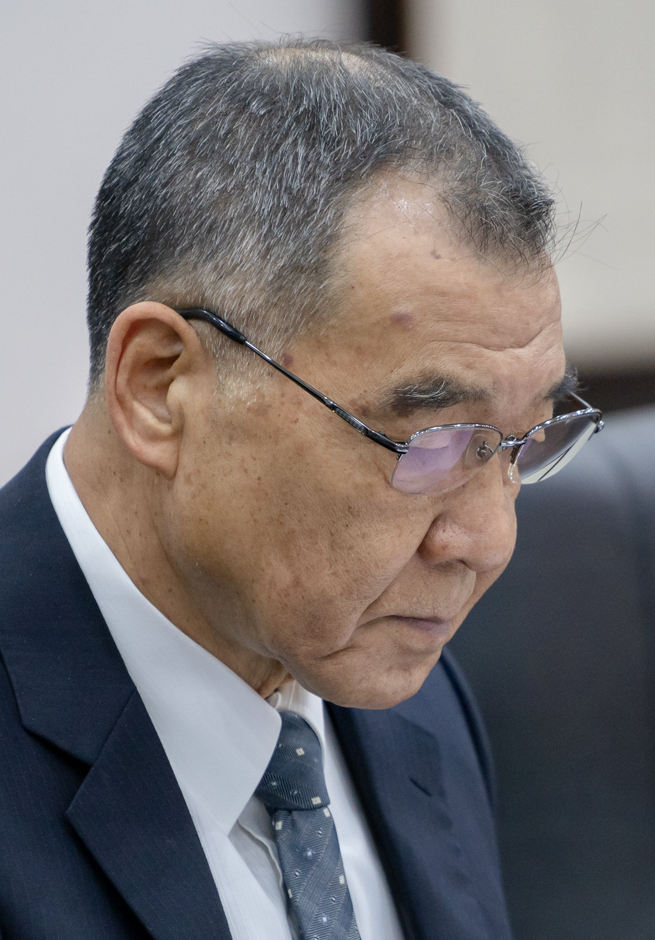
- Chiu in 2020

34th Minister of National Defense
- In office 23 February 2021 – 20 May 2024
- President: Tsai Ing-wen
- Premier: Su Tseng-chang; Chen Chien-jen
- Preceded by: Yen Teh-fa
- Succeeded by: Wellington Koo

18th Director-General of the National Security Bureau
- In office 24 July 2019 – 22 February 2021
- Preceded by: Peng Sheng-chu; Ko Cheng-heng (acting)
- Succeeded by: Chen Ming-tong

3rd Minister of the Veterans Affairs Council
- In office 26 February 2018 – 23 July 2019
- Preceded by: Lee Shying-jow
- Succeeded by: Lee Wen-chung (acting); Feng Shih-kuan

25th Chief of the General Staff of the ROC Armed Forces
- In office 1 December 2016 – 30 April 2017
- Preceded by: Yen Teh-fa
- Succeeded by: Lee Hsi-ming

6th Commander of the ROC Army
- In office 30 January 2015 – 30 November 2016
- Preceded by: Yen Teh-fa
- Succeeded by: Wang Shin-lung

9th Deputy Minister of National Defense for Armaments
- In office 1 August 2014 – 29 January 2015
- Preceded by: Lee Shying-jow
- Succeeded by: Liu Chen-wu

Personal details
- Born: 12 April 1953 (age 73) Taipei, Taiwan
- Party: Independent
- Education: Republic of China Military Academy (BS); National Defense University; South African Military Academy; United States Army War College
- Nickname(s): General Turf-Scalp; Chiu the Squad-leader

Military service
- Allegiance: Republic of China
- Branch/service: Republic of China Army
- Years of service: 1971–2017
- Rank: Chief of the General Staff (Chinese: Cānmóu zǒngzhǎng)

Chiu Kuo-cheng (Chinese: 邱國正; pinyin: Qiū Guózhèng; born 12 April 1953) is a Taiwanese politician and retired Republic of China Army general. He was Minister of National Defense from 2021 to 2024 and the director-general of the National Security Bureau from 2019 to 2021. He served as the Chief of General Staff of the Republic of China Armed Forces from 1 December 2016 to 28 April 2017, and was a former Vice Minister of National Defense for Armaments.

== Education ==
Chiu graduated from the Republic of China Military Academy in 1976 and was commissioned into the Republic of China Military Academy armored corps. He graduated from the Army Command and Staff College of National Defense University in 1989, then studied at the South African Military Academy in 1992, before completing the advanced studies at the War College of National Defense University in 1995. He also completed a 1-year training program of the United States Army War College in 1999. He was inducted into the school's International Fellows Hall of Fame in 2018.

== Career ==
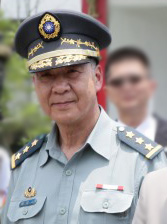
Chiu Kuo-cheng in 2017

Chiu was the president of National Defense University in Taoyuan from 1 September 2012 to 31 July 2014. Chiu was Vice Minister of National Defense for Armaments from August 2014 to January 2015.

Chiu was Commander of the ROC Army from January 2015 through November 2016.

He was appointed to the position of Chief of the General Staff of the ROC Armed Forces on 24 November 2016, upon the retirement of General Yen Teh-fa, and assumed this post on 1 December of that year. Admiral Lee Hsi-ming succeeded his post on 28 April 2017.

Chiu took office as head of the Veterans Affairs Council on 26 February 2018, succeeding Lee Shying-jow.

Chiu succeeded Peng Sheng-chu at the National Security Bureau on 24 July 2019. During his term, the Wang Liqiang incident resulting in the detention case of the couple Xiang xin and Gong Qing for influencing the 2020 Taiwanese presidential election strained the cross-strait relations, while the internal legal issues continued such as the tax-free cigarette smuggling investigation procedure with the review failed to reform the Special Service Command Center from the NSB structure, the compensation lawsuit of a severe training gun-shot injury, and the unresolved military vs civil personnel administrative contradiction with power struggles in the intelligence circle. General Chiu's promise during the parliament committee hearing in 2020 to task a special project to examine the impeached sexual violation case failed without open follow-up report, but the accused superior silently retired, and the female victim trainee being charged in another reason, hence further exposed the long-term ethical and the appealing system issues.

In February 2021, Chiu was appointed defense minister. He formally assumed the role on 23 February 2021.

== Legacy ==
=== Language dispute in the Legislative Yuan ===
The 2018 Development of National Languages Act stipulates the government agencies to provide interpretation services when citizens participating in administrative, legislative, and judicial procedures can freely choose to use their national languages, therefore the Legislative Yuan activated the interpreters for the parliament session in real time accordingly. On 27 September 2021, after having followed the regulation to apply the real-time interpretation service in advance and 3 Taiwanese interpreters been present ready at site, Legislator, Chen Po-wei of the Taiwan Statebuilding Party proceeded his scheduled questioning in Taiwanese during the session of Foreign and National Defense Committee. Chiu rejected to speak Taiwanese, nor accepted the interpreter's real-time service at site, but brought the deputy minister Zong-hsiao Li as his own interpreter, and insisted in the 3-way translation pattern sentence by sentence. Chiu repeatedly interrupted the question process by asking Chen to speak Mandarin Chinese for easier communication, or the session time cannot be lengthened to accommodate the interpretation, but Li is not a linguistic professional, hence his translation contains contextual errors, so Chairman Chen I-hsin intervened when the argument heated, and tried to introduce the existing synchronized interpretation in progress at site as the solution same as the common conference practice in the other countries, but Chiu never picked up the earset, but insisted his way till the session run out of time. Chen later apologized to the public for the good intention of practicing the national language law being turned into a linguistic communication tragedy, and condemned Chiu for "bullying" (鴨霸), but Chiu denied the allegation and claimed that a language is a tool of communication. The parliamentary interpretation service were temporarily suspended afterwards pending on better communication in the future - consequently the parliament members and media editorials such as Kuan Bi-ling and Taipei Times commented that Language is not just a tool of communication as Chiu said, but also an identity of feelings and culture. Councilor Miao Poya also explained that the multi-lingual working environment is essential for a healthy mind without the "Chinese Language Supremacy" (華語至上) attitude to achieve the international level in diversity, equality and mutual respect for a modern state.

=== March 7 Incident script controversy in military literature award ===
On 29 November 2021, during the process co-operating with the Parliament to establish the All-Out Defense Mobilization Agency to reform the ROC Armed Forces Reserve system, Chiu personally handed a fifty-fifth annual military literature award to Colonel Yi-ching Zhou, Deputy Commander of the Psychological Warfare Team from the Political Warfare Bureau, author of the controversial short screen script Lao Dzai (老翟) for its deviation from the historical facts of Lieyu massacre in 1987, referring to the conscription reserve officer in the second lieutenant rank from the National Taiwan University and a retired Senior master sergeant as the offenders and the end with the refugees received the compensation to leave peacefully, hence caused injustice concern among the veterans in the society.

=== Critical comment on the Special Force soldier complaint ===
On 11 March 2022, a special force member wrote a letter to President Tsai Ing-wen complaining that the insufficient logistic supply for the basic combatant equipment has compelled the soldiers to purchase from outsider suppliers at their own expense for two years, then being disqualified as non-standard, in contrast of the reserve trainees receiving new sets; and appealed to abolish the mandatory diary writing for examination. The classified document "2022006470" was mysteriously leaked from the President Office with his identity exposed to the media. On 18 March, Chiu claimed: "I will not let him get away with it", "Fix the crying baby!"; but later clarified while being questioned by the parliament members in the Legislative Yuan, that he just disgusts the coward behavior behind his back, and the critique unfair to the preparatory staff. The incident raised the broad attention on related issues with perspective discussion in politics.

=== FBI Counterintelligence Investigation ===
In October, 2022, FBI Counterintelligence Division arrested Chu Yi-fei (朱一飛), an employee of the National Oceanic and Atmospheric Administration for making false statements about his ties with the Republic of China Navy and falsifying documents when applying for security clearance, according to the FBI investigator's affidavit filed in federal court. Born in Taiwan, Chu signed forms declaring he had renounced his citizenship in 2008, but concealed the fact being still a ROC citizen; and also lied about obtaining a new ROC passport and traveling to live in Taiwan in 2020-21 without his supervisors' knowledge.

Chu failed to disclose extensive contacts with the ROC Navy members and being hired by the Taiwanese company, and multiple meeting occasions on a military base in Taiwan. Chu provided the ROC Navy the consulting services related to his work during an employment period with the United States Navy, which predated his work at NOAA, as per the criminal complaint announced by United States Attorney Dawn Ison.

On 28 October, Chiu declares that Chu is not ROC military personnel, nor does he have direct contact with the ROC Navy, nor ever entered a military camp as rumored.

== Honors ==
- 2024 Order of Brilliant Star with Grand Cordon
