= Hu Kexian =

Chinese general (1909–1961)

Hu Kexian 胡克先
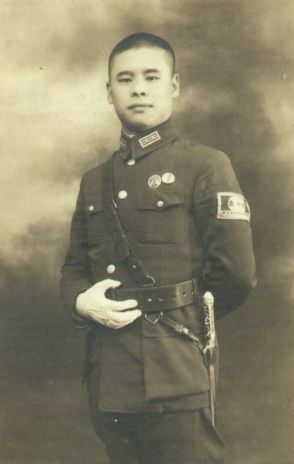
- Born: 11 September 1909 Chengdu, Sichuan
- Died: 19 September 1961 (aged 52) Tainan, Taiwan
- Allegiance: Republic of China
- Branch: (Republic of China (1912–1949)) National Revolutionary Army
- Battles / wars: Second Sino-Japanese War; Battle of Shanghai; Chinese Civil War
- Children: Hu Shaoning; Hu Shaorong; Hu Shaoyu

Hu Kexian (Chinese: 胡克先; pinyin: Hú Kèxiān) was a Chinese general who served in the National Revolutionary Army (NRA) during the Second Sino-Japanese War and the Chinese Civil War. The sixth year graduate of the famous Whampoa Military Academy at the age of 19, Hu Kexian became a Lieutenant General at the age of 28 and was in charge of the only heavy artillery regiment (10th regiment/第十團重炮兵團長) of the ROC army during his time. His heavy artillery regiment played a major role during the Second Sino-Japanese War (1937–1945) such as the Battle of Shanghai because the artillery regiment was trained under the German Nazi instructors and possessed the most effective weaponry in both skill and technology for its time.

The son of an ex-government official (華陽縣縣長) of the Qing Dynasty, Hu Kexian was sent away by his parents to study business in Chongqing when he was a teenager; However, Hu Kexian ran away en route to Chongqing and joined the Huangpu Army Academy in Nanjing. The young man had the ambition of helping Chiang Kai-shek to restore order to China during the period of chaos with warlords throughout the country. By the time Hu Kexian graduated the academy, the campaign against the warlords had already ended, but the invasion of the Japanese had just begun.

Hu Kexian was very talented in Chinese calligraphy. During his trip to join the Huangpu Academy, Hu Kexian had run out of money by the time he reached Guangzhou, where the academy used to be before it relocated to Nanjing. Hu was able use his calligraphy skill to make some fast cash to help him reach the academy in Nanjing successfully.

After the Chinese Civil War, Hu Kexian became the head of security in the southern region of Taiwan (南區警備司令) and often accompanied Chiang Kai-shek to patrol and inspect the cities in the region.

Hu Kexian died in Tainan due to cerebral hemorrhage. He was survived by three sons: Hu Shaoning (胡紹寧), Hu Shaorong (胡紹蓉), and Hu Shaoyu (胡紹渝). His eldest son, Hu Shaoning, was the most trusted one and would often be called in by his father to consult on different matters.

== Military strategy ==
During one of the battles in Yunnan, Hu Kexian's unit had the Japanese army surrounded and trapped in the caves. The Japanese refused to come out while they were being attacked by Hu's heavy artillery. In response, Hu ordered his troops to use the smaller artillery to fire at the Japanese, making the enemy believe Hu's unit had run out of ammunition for the heavy artillery. Unable to reach the caves with the smaller artillery, the Japanese came out of the caves and prepared for a full-scale flanking on Hu's unit. After tricking the Japanese out of their caves, Hu Kexian re-ordered his unit to blast the enemy again with the heavy artillery and successfully annihilated them.
