= Peng Sheng-chu =

Taiwanese military officer

- 彭勝竹
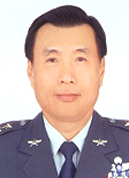

Director-General of National Security Bureau of the Republic of China
- In office 26 October 2016 – 22 July 2019
- Preceded by: Yang Kuo-chiang
- Succeeded by: Ko Cheng-heng (柯承亨) (acting); Chiu Kuo-cheng

Personal details
- Born: February 1950 (age 76)
- Education: Republic of China Air Force Academy (BS); National Defense University (MS)

Military service
- Branch/service: Republic of China Air Force
- Rank: General

Peng Sheng-chu (traditional Chinese: 彭勝竹; simplified Chinese: 彭胜竹; pinyin: Péng Shèngzhú) is a Taiwanese politician and retired general of the Republic of China Air Force (ROCAF). He is the Director-General of the National Security Bureau since 26 October 2016.

== Career ==
Peng was once the chief bodyguard of President Chen Shui-bian. In June 2005, he became the head of Military Intelligence Bureau. In 2009, he was appointed as the strategic adviser for the Presidential Office.

Being the first director general with the ROC Air Force background in both MIB and NSB history, Peng always behaved prudently, but lost the parliament members' confidence for being considered as arrogant to the parliament and unfamiliar with the intelligence works after failing to be present in several important legal hearings in the Legislative Yuan during his term, submitting the false intelligence report with out-of-date information being noticed and corrected by President Tsai Ing-wen in person, and being unable to answer common questions such as identifying the basic information of MSS, nevertheless he also neglected to correct the worsened long-term ethical corruption among subordinates in time until the discipline failures accumulated into more serious crime within the Secret Services were discovered, such as the security guard's sexual harassment case, sidearm discharge accident without following the SOP properly, motel sex scandal, and multiple drinking violations while in duty for years... till the 2019 smuggling case of $200,000 Tax-free cigarettes in 9,800 packs (including 5 illegal orders of 9,200 packs with the Air Force One privilege, and 600 packs trafficking in person) being solved by the Ministry of Justice Investigation Bureau. On 22 July 2019, Peng tendered his resignation due to the cigarette smuggling scandals.

== See also ==
- National Security Council (Taiwan)
