= China–Norway relations =

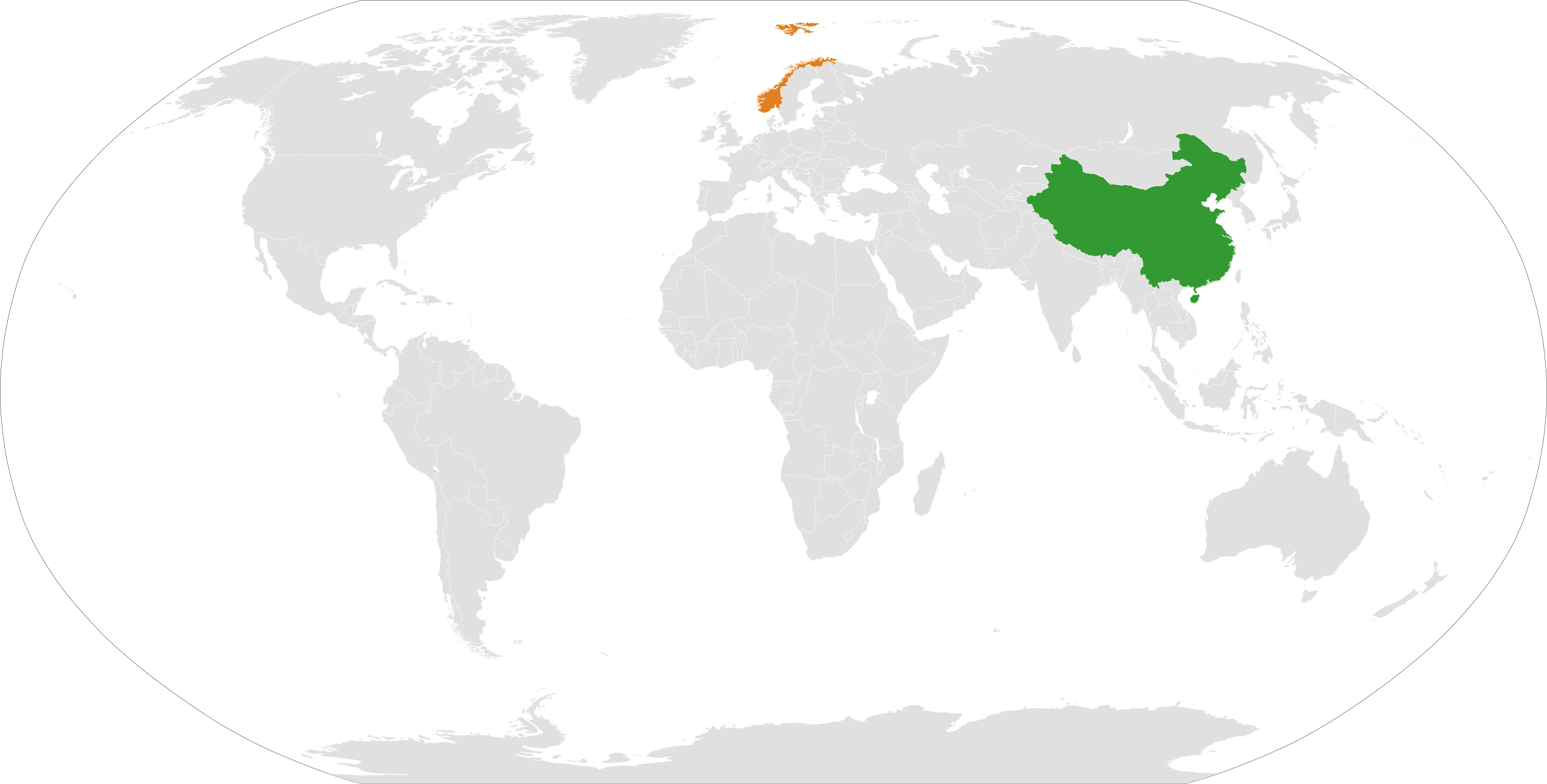
- China: Norway

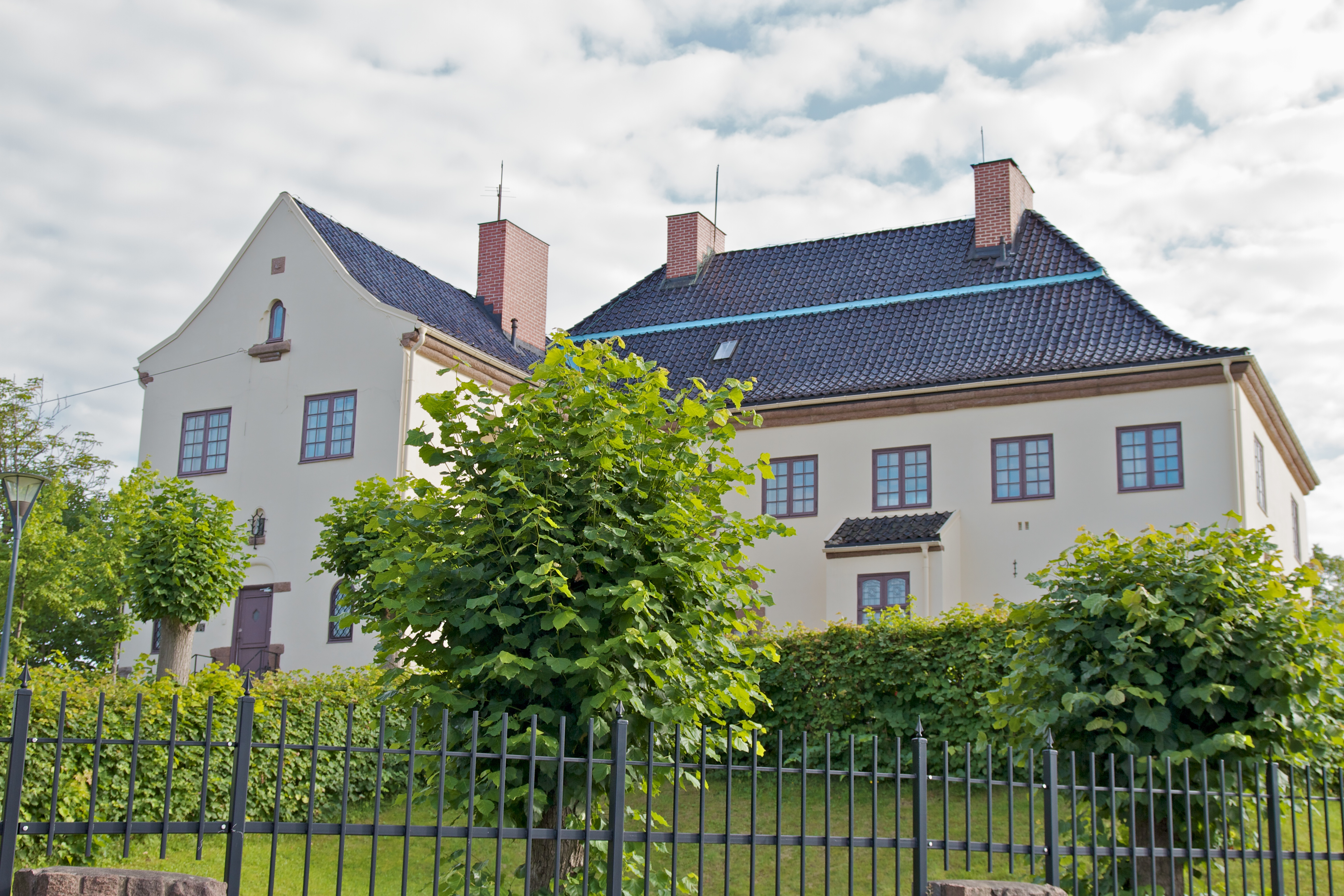
The Chinese embassy in Oslo, Norway

The People's Republic of China and Norway relations established diplomatic relations on 7 October 1950 and shortly after they established diplomatic missions on 5 October 1954.

== History ==
The first Norwegian diplomatic mission was founded 1851 during the union of Sweden and Norway. This was established in Guangzhou. In 1853, a new vice consulate was set up in Shanghai. By 1863, Shanghai became the Consulate General and the branch in Guangzhou was relegated into a vice consulate.

It was not until 1905 when Norway was split from the union with Sweden it had its own diplomatic mission in China. A year later, the first official visit from the Qing dynasty took place with Dai Hongci, chairman for the Imperial Court's Cultural Department.

=== 21st century ===
The commencement of diplomatic relations between the two countries nearly 60 years ago has progressed from cultural and political exchanges to trade ties such as economy, industry and technology.

In 2003, the volume of the bilateral trade between China and Norway was US$1.76 billion. Bilateral trade has steadily increased over the years.

In 2008, the export value from Norway to China is $1.93 billion and exports from China to Norway were up to $5.43 billion. In 2009, Norway's exports to China increased by 39 percent to a value of $2.28 billion. Exports, consisting of equipment, chemicals, optical and medical appliances, have gone up. China's exports to Norway amount to some $5.25 billion, increasing by 4.5 percent from last year.

China's largest exports to Norway were ships, textiles and garments, and mechanical and electronic products.

Norway's largest exports to China were crude oil, mechanical and electrical products, fertilizer, construction, mining equipment, factory and plant equipment, and salmon, as well as raw metals.

==== 2010s ====
The Chinese-Norwegian relationship ran into a large setback in 2010 because the Norwegian parliament-appointed Norwegian Nobel Committee awarded the 2010 Nobel Peace Prize to incarcerated Chinese human rights activist, Liu Xiaobo. China reacted strongly, saying that relations between their two countries had been damaged. A planned meeting in Beijing between Norwegian Fisheries Minister Lisbeth Berg-Hansen and Chinese food control authorities was cancelled at the last minute, ostensibly because their counterparts had "other engagements"; Norwegian officials said that a meeting due to be held the same day between Berg-Hansen and the Chinese vice-minister for fisheries had been cancelled in reaction to the award. Elsewhere, performances of a Norwegian musical scheduled for the following month starring Alexander Rybak, winner of the Eurovision Song Contest 2009, also fell victim to the diplomatic fallout, according to the musical's composer. In early December, Norway announced that its bilateral trade talks with China had been indefinitely put on hold. Haakon Hjelde, Norway's negotiator alleged the postponement was not directly linked to the award, but Henning Kristofferson, director of international relations of the BI Norwegian School of Management, was certain that this was a retaliatory move. He said that Beijing had been "very clear that the prize was a big mistake and that it would damage relations."

The press secretary of Norway's foreign ministry (Hilde Steinfeld) confirmed in November 2011, the absence of bilateral talks during the last 12 months.

The finance committee of Norway's parliament, cancelled its planned trip to China in spring 2012, after not having secured appointments with any leading government representatives of China. The newspaper Klassekampen wrote that Norwegian "war ships are being directed to Northern areas (nordområdene) because nations like Russia and China are showing increased interest for the natural resources of the North. – This is an important region for resources, and a number of nations are showing their interest there, but there is no imminent threat, says Minister of Defence Espen Barth Eide".

The standoff continued into 2013 with unofficial Chinese restrictions on Norwegian salmon and visas and China comparing Norway's action to a noose around the tiger's neck. A 22 April 2014 NRK article said that by not having Norwegian officials meet with Dalai Lama during his upcoming visit, "one sends a quite unfortunate signal, not only to Chinese authorities but to people in Tibet who are exposed to ever increasing repression". A same day Dagbladet op-ed said that "We, as a nation, come across as being led by a president of parliament (and a Government?) that live by the moral [that] the brakkebaronene lived by during the war: Close the eyes for violations of human rights, forget the occupation, money triumphs [or decides]".

Norway and China normalized its diplomatic and political bilateral relations, which had been frozen since 2010 when Liu Xiaobo received the Nobel Peace Prize. In 2018, Norway's private IT infrastructure was penetrated by China's Ministry of State Security-linked hacking group APT31. In July 2019, the UN ambassadors from 22 nations, including Norway, signed a joint letter to the UNHRC condemning China's persecution of the Uyghurs as well as its mistreatment of other minority groups, urging the Chinese government to close the Xinjiang re-education camps.

==== 2020s ====
Norwegian parliamentary email accounts were breached by Chinese state hackers during the 2021 Microsoft Exchange Server data breach.

The bilateral relations of China and Norway has seen some improvements since the normalization in 2016. In talks held between former Chinese minister of foreign affairs Qin Gang and Norwegian prime minister Jonas Gahr Støre in May 2023, Gang described Norway as a friendly country, and that there is a "massive potential for cooperation" During the meeting it was also announced that the Norwegian passport would be eligible for longer stays of 72/144 hours in China without a Visa. With the improving relations, the trade between the nations have grown significantly, with imports to Norway almost quadrupling. China is exporting, mainly high-tech goods, and Norway exporting mainly raw materials.

In 2024, Norway blocked the sale of the last privately owned property on Svalbard for national security reasons following interest in its acquisition from a Chinese buyer. In July 2024, Norwegian authorities arrested a suspected spy for China. In May 2026, the Norwegian Police Security Service arrested a Chinese national on suspicion of attempting to illegally obtain satellite data.

In July 2026, Norwegian prime minister Støre urged China to use its influence with Russia to help facilitate negotiations aimed at ending the war in Ukraine. Støre said that China's close relationship with Russia gave Beijing a unique opportunity to encourage peace talks, while also arguing that this partnership constrained China's economic and political relations with Europe.

== See also ==
- Norway–Taiwan relations
