= Tsai De-sheng =

Taiwanese politician (born 1949)

- 蔡得勝
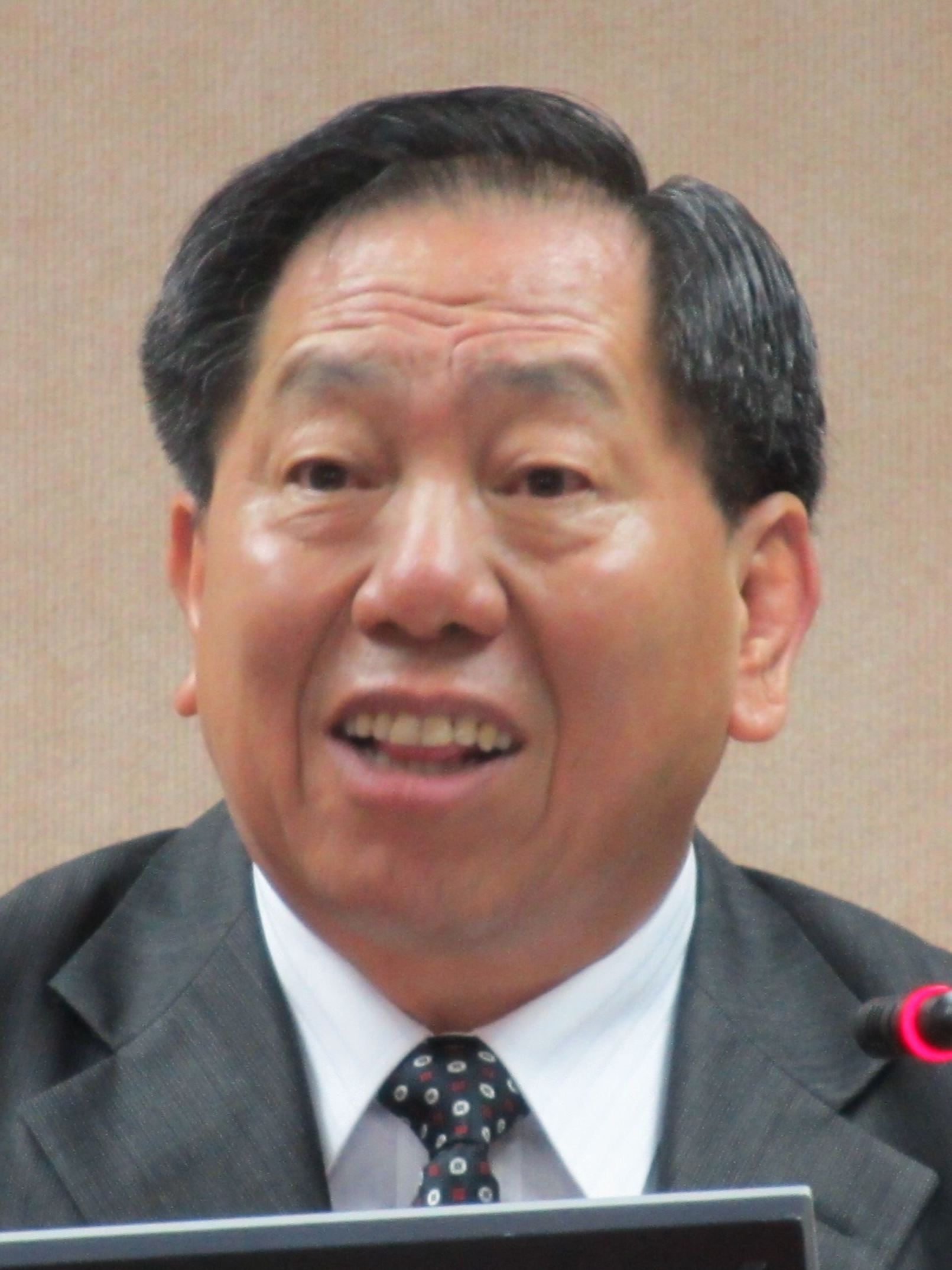

Director-General of the National Security Bureau of the Republic of China
- In office 1 May 2009 – 5 May 2014
- Deputy: Lin Hui-yang, Yan Meng-han
- Preceded by: Tsai Chao-ming
- Succeeded by: Lee Shying-jow

Personal details
- Born: February 1949 (age 77) Xiyu, Penghu, Taiwan
- Education: Fu Hsing Kang College; Army Infantry School

Tsai De-sheng (simplified Chinese: 蔡得胜; traditional Chinese: 蔡得勝; pinyin: Cài Déshèng) is a Taiwanese politician. He was the Director-General of the National Security Bureau (NSB) from 2009 to 2014. NSB during his term was known for the increasing corruption custom such as changing the internal regulation to apply bureau budgets on private travels of families, and demanding local stationed agents risking of identity exposure and security concern to arrange or pay for the private affairs.

== NSB Director-General ==
=== Li Sheng-dong incident ===
On 16 March 2011, Tsai's long-term colleague in D4 (Intelligence Analyses), Li Sheng-dong being the director stationed in Germany, suddenly ran away from the ongoing counterintelligence investigation process of the Federal Office for the Protection of the Constitution (BfV, German: Bundesamt für Verfassungsschutz or Bundesverfassungsschutz) back to Taipei without notification, however received no disciplinary measure but continual seniority promotions till Li's retirement 3 years later, causing internal morale concerns, hence both were reported and questioned by the hearing of Judiciary and Organic Laws Committee in the Legislative Yuan in December 2013, whereas both firmly denied every accusation.

=== Huawei products ban ===
In end of October 2013, speaking at the Legislative Yuan, Tsai said that the NSB didn't support the usage by ROC government agencies of products from mainland China-based Huawei. He added that the government should be more alert for the possibility of information leakage to mainland China via Huawei products.
