= Trade Council of Denmark, Taipei =

- 丹麥商務辦事處
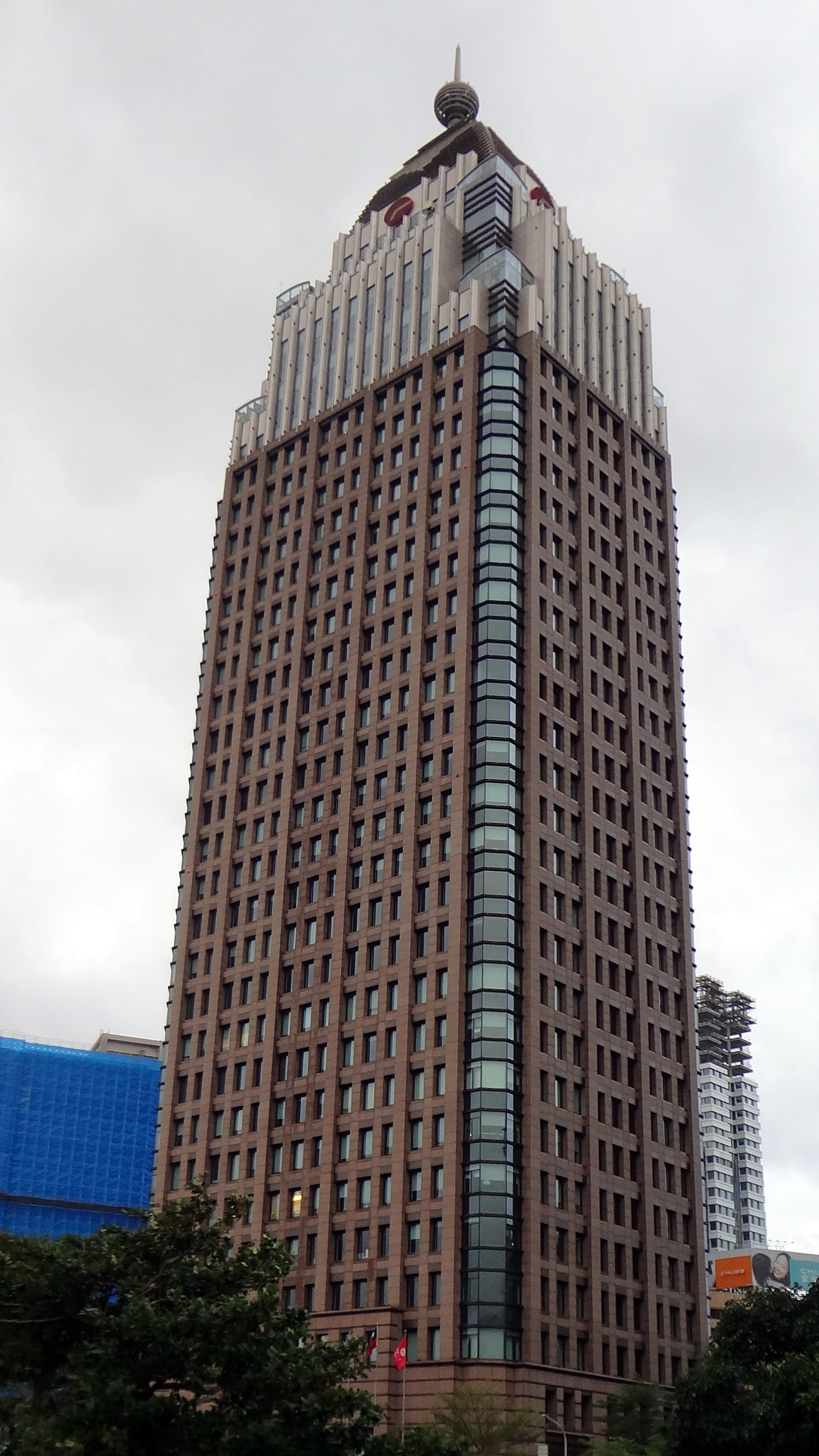
- Farglory Financial Center

Agency overview
- Formed: 1983
- Jurisdiction: Republic of China
- Headquarters: Xinyi, Taipei, Taiwan; 25°02′23.0″N 121°33′51.3″E
- Agency executive: Peter Sand, Director
- Website: taipei.um.dk

The Trade Council of Denmark, Taipei (Chinese: 丹麥商務辦事處; pinyin: Dānmài Shāngwù Bànshì Chù) represents interests of Denmark in Taiwan in the absence of formal diplomatic relations, functioning as a de facto embassy. Its counterpart in Denmark is the Taipei Representative Office in Denmark in Copenhagen.

It was established in 1983 as the Danish Trade Organisations' Taipei Office.

The Trade Council’s Taipei office provides consular services to Danish citizens in Taiwan, including the issuing of Danish passports. In addition, it is responsible for the issuing of visas for Denmark, Norway and Iceland. It also handles Norwegian passport applications on behalf of the Norwegian Embassy in Singapore. Norway previously had its own Norwegian Trade Council office in Taipei, but this was closed in 2004.

The Office is headed by the Director, Peter Sand.

== See also ==
- Denmark–Taiwan relations
- List of diplomatic missions in Taiwan
- List of diplomatic missions of Denmark
