= Lee Shying-jow =

Taiwanese general and diplomat

- 李翔宙
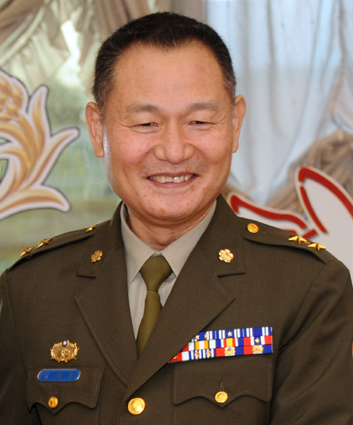
- Lee in 2011

9th Ambassador of Taiwan to Denmark
- In office 19 October 2018 – 3 October 2024
- President: Tsai Ing-wen; Lai Ching-te
- Preceded by: Chuang Heng-sheng
- Succeeded by: Robin J.C. Cheng

2nd Minister of the Veteran Affairs Council
- In office 20 May 2016 – 25 February 2018
- Prime Minister: Lin Chuan; Lai Ching-te
- Deputy: Liu Shu-lin; Lee Wen-chung
- Preceded by: Tung Hsiang-lung
- Succeeded by: Chiu Kuo-cheng

National Policy Advisor to the President
- In office 24 July 2015 – 19 May 2016
- President: Ma Ying-jeou

15th Director-General of the National Security Bureau
- In office 5 May 2014 – 23 July 2015
- President: Ma Ying-jeou
- Deputy: Yen Meng-han; Kuo Chung-hsin; Wang Te-lin; Chou Mei-wu
- Preceded by: Tsai De-sheng
- Succeeded by: Yang Kuo-chiang

8th Armaments Deputy Minister of National Defense
- In office 16 January 2014 – 4 May 2014
- Minister: Yen Ming
- Preceded by: Yen Teh-fa
- Succeeded by: Chiu Kuo-cheng

4th Commander of the ROC Army
- In office 16 August 2011 – 15 January 2014
- Deputy: Huang Yi-ping; Hsun Chueh-hsin; Chu Yu-shu; Wu Yo-ming; Wang Hsing-wei
- Preceded by: Yang Tien-hsiao
- Succeeded by: Yen Teh-fa

Vice Chief of the General Staff of the ROC Armed Forces
- In office 16 May 2011 – 15 August 2011
- Preceded by: Wu Ta-peng
- Succeeded by: Yen Teh-fa

25th Commander of the ROC Military Police
- In office 1 June 2009 – 15 May 2011
- Deputy: Kao Yao-bing
- Preceded by: Ho Yung-chien
- Succeeded by: Chang Ching-hsiang

5th Vice President of the National Defense University
- In office 1 March 2008 – 31 May 2009
- President: Tseng Jing-ling; King Nai-chieh
- Preceded by: Lu Hsiao-jung
- Succeeded by: Wang Chuen-chiang

Personal details
- Born: 2 August 1952 (age 74) Donggang Township, Pingtung County, Taiwan
- Party: Independent
- Education: Republic of China Military Academy (BS); National Defense University (MS); National Taiwan University (MA); National Chung Hsing University (MS); Georgetown University (MS)
- Nickname: "Brother Chou"

Military service
- Allegiance: Republic of China
- Branch/service: Republic of China Army (1974–2009, 2011–2015); Republic of China Military Police (2009–2011)
- Years of service: 1974–2015
- Rank: General
- Battles/wars: Third Taiwan Strait Crisis

Lee Shying-jow or Frank S.J Lee (Chinese: 李翔宙; pinyin: Li Xiángzhòu; born 2 August 1952) is a Taiwanese general and diplomat. He is the incumbent Representative to Denmark, and was formerly the 4th Commanding General of the Republic of China Army (ROCA), 8th Deputy Minister of National Defense (MND), the 15th Director-General of the National Security Bureau (NSB) and the 2nd Minister of the Veterans Affairs Council (VAC).

== Early life ==
Lee Hsiang-chou was born in a military dependents' village of Republic of China Air Force veterans called "the Republican New Village (共和新村)" at Donggang, Pingtung. His family's ancestral home is in Xinxiang, Henan.

Lee later entered the Republic of China Army Preparatory School right after his completion of junior high school at age 15. He then later graduated from the Republic of China Military Academy in 1974 as a Missile Officer, and earned master's degrees from National Taiwan University, National Chung Hsing University, and Georgetown University in the United States.

== Military career ==
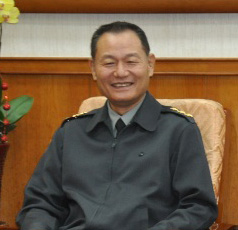
Gen. Lee Shying-jow during his tenure as Commanding General of the Army (ROCA).

=== Early military position ===
Lee served as the Commander of Military Police (ROCMP) from 1 June 2009 to 16 May 2011. He was promoted to General of the ROC Army on 16 May 2011 and appointed as the Vice Chief of the General Staff under Admiral Lin Chen-yi, the then Chief of the General Staff.

=== Army Commanding General ===
General Lee was appointed to success General Yang Tien-hsiao as the Commanding General of the ROC Army on 16 August 2011.

On 16 July and 8 August 2013, General Lee tendered his resignation from his chief position and from the Ministry of National Defense due to the poor handling of the minister on the death scandal of Corporal Hung Chung-chiu, but was rejected by Defense Minister Kao Hua-chu and Yen Ming. Both Kao and Yen asked him to stay in his post.

=== Deputy Minister of National Defense ===
In early April 2014, speaking to the Foreign Affairs and National Defense Committee of the Legislative Yuan, Lee said that if the People's Liberation Army (PLA) were to invade Taiwan, they need at least four months for assault preparation, thus translated to the amount of advance warning Taiwan needs in such scenario. In the event of cross-strait war, the command has to come from Zhongnanhai, the headquarter of the Chinese Communist Party, by the task force formation at the Central Military Commission. The next step would be recalling all of the Chinese envoys in Taiwan, execute economic preparations and tighten control of Taiwanese business people in mainland China. He added that Taiwan has already prepared relevant measures with other countries and military reserve would be called in such attack scenario. Military confidence building measure can only be built between ROC Armed Forces and PLA only if the government of China renounces the use of force to achieve Chinese unification. The ROC Ministry of National Defense however would always remain neutral in any cross-strait issues, he added.

== Political career ==
=== Veterans minister for the Tsai Administration ===
On 28 April 2016, Lee Hsiang-chou was designated to be the new Minister of the Veterans Affairs Council. He then took office on 20 May 2016. Prior to assuming the position, Lee registered as a political independent, ending his affiliation with the Kuomintang, which he had joined in 1969.

In December 2016, on his way to visit Thailand from Taiwan, Lee was denied stopover entry into Singapore for the purpose of visiting veterans of the Republic of China Armed Forces residing in the small island nation.

=== Ambassador to Denmark ===
Lee left the Veterans Affairs Council in February 2018, and was appointed Taiwan's representative to Denmark that October.
