= Lily Li-Wen Hsu =

Taiwanese diplomat

- 徐儷文
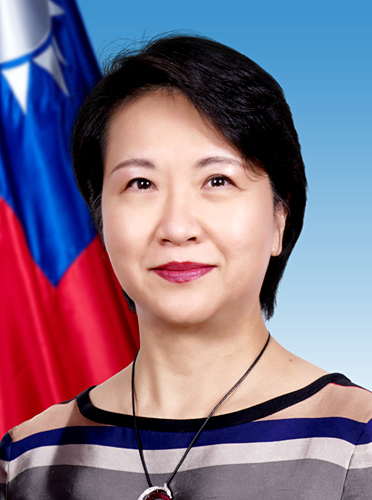
- Official portrait

Ambassador of the Republic of China to Belize
- Incumbent
- Assumed office 24 February 2023
- Preceded by: David K. C. Chien

Representative of the Republic of China to Denmark
- In office August 2012 – January 2016
- Preceded by: Clark Chen
- Succeeded by: Chuang Heng-sheng

Personal details
- Born: Hsu Li-Wen; 1962 (age 63–64) Taiwan
- Spouse: Tung Kuo-yu
- Education: National Taiwan University (BA)

Chinese name
- Traditional Chinese: 徐儷文
- Simplified Chinese: 徐俪文
Transcriptions
Standard Mandarin
- Hanyu Pinyin: Xú Lìwén
Southern Min
- Hokkien POJ: Sû lî-bûn

Lily Li-Wen Hsu (Chinese: 徐儷文; pinyin: Xú Lìwén; born 1962) is a Taiwanese diplomat who has been the ambassador to Belize since 2023.

== Early life and education ==
Lily Hsu was born in 1962. She graduated with a Bachelor of Arts (B.A.) in political science from the National Taiwan University. In 2009, she was a visiting scholar at the George Washington University's Sigur Center of Asian Studies.

== Diplomatic career ==
=== Taiwan frigate scandal ===
Following the Taiwan frigate scandal in August 2004, Hsu was the deputy leader of the Taipei Representative Office in the United Kingdom, and alongside others were transferred to the Control Yuan and the Public Functionary Disciplinary Sanction Commission, respectively. The envoy in the UK, Tien Hung-mao, also tendered his resignation. Following an inquiry, the Control Yuan passed on the case involving Hsu and a secretary at the office in the UK, and the prosecution office was tasked with determining whether there was any criminal responsibility involved.

=== Ministry of Foreign Affairs ===
From July 2010 to August 2012, Hsu was the director of International Organisations at the Ministry of Foreign Affairs of Taiwan. Cho Shih-chao, the Director of International Trade at the Ministry of Economic Affairs, frequently attended meetings with Hsu and senior APEC officials at the Ministry of Foreign Affairs. At a seminar in the United States in April 2012, Joseph C. Y. Chang (張謙彥) disclosed that Taiwan planned to co-organize the 2014 APEC Ministerial Meeting with mainland China. According to Lily Hsu, the VOA reporter misrepresented Chang's conversation and Taiwan had not gotten in touch with mainland China regarding this issue. In August, she became the representative of Taiwan to Denmark, a position she would hold until December 2015.

=== United States ===
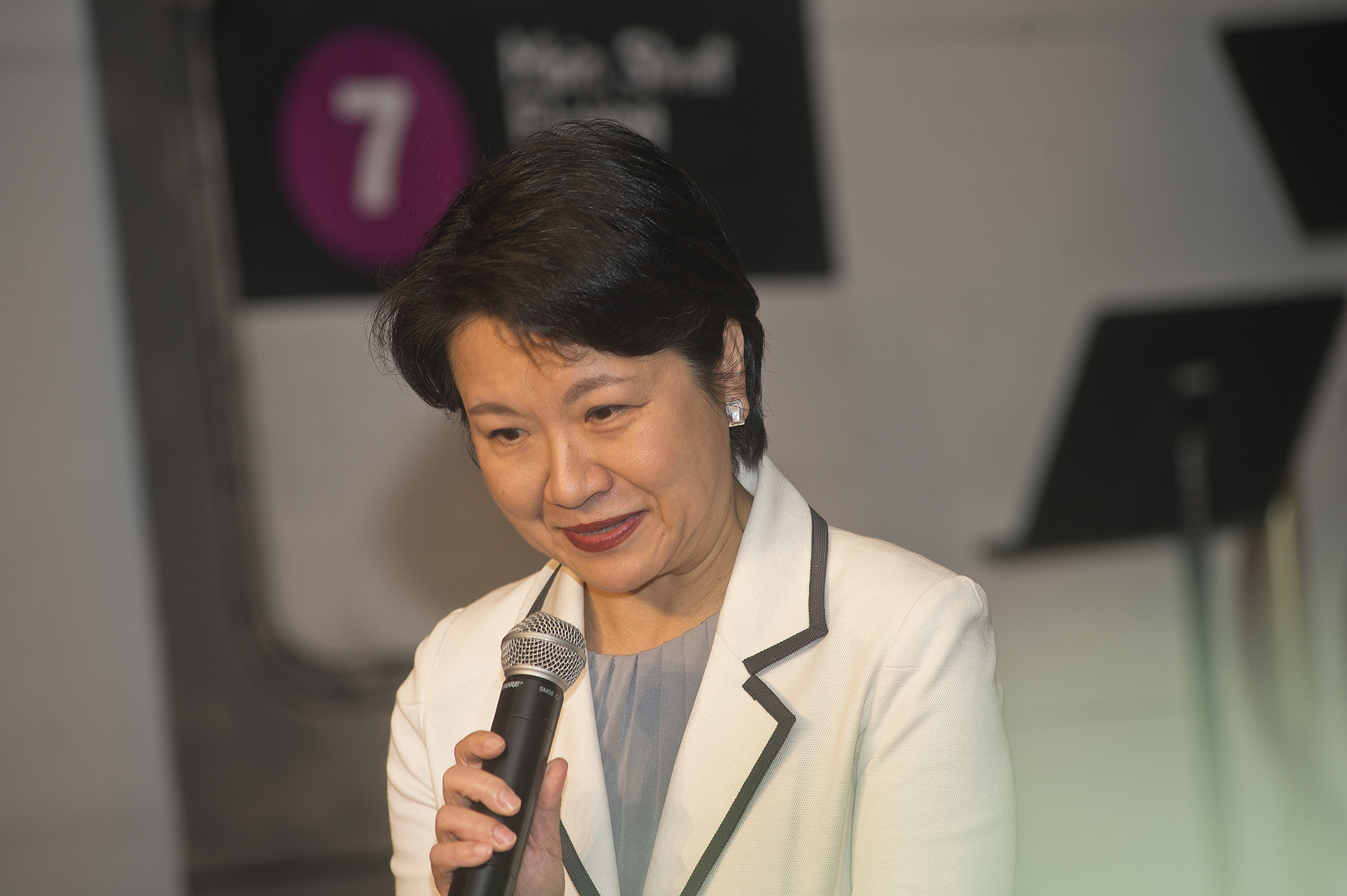
Lily Hsu giving a speech in 2016

Hsu was appointed as the first female director of the Republic of China in New York City in January 2016. Vice President Chen Chein-jen traveled via New York in August 2016 following a visit to the Dominican Republic, Raymond Burghardt, Hsu, together with other representatives traveled to the airport to welcome him and attended a dinner. President Tsai Ing-wen and President Donald Trump spoke in December 2016, "This phone call basically shows the friendship and friendship between Taiwan and the United States," noted Lily Hsu.

During the president of Taiwan's visit to New York in July 2019, she was once again greeted by her at the airport. The Republic of China has not publicly attended a meeting held at UN Headquarters since its exit from the organisation, despite this Lily Hsu was invited. Some reporters inquired about her status as she arrived at the venue with the U.S. State Department and the New York office, respectively, but they received no response. China's Ministry of Foreign Affairs spokesperson, Geng Shuang, responded by stating that the meeting was organised by the US on the basis of the UN and that an informal UN conference was held. He also criticised "Taiwan personnel for sneaking into the UN in a sneaky manner" but insisted that it was a "diplomatic breakthrough."

Tsung-Tsong Wu, the head of Taiwan's delegation to the BIO International Convention (BIO 2019), and Lily Hsu delivered the keynote addresses for the occasion. "Taiwan has become the major biotech hub in Asia," she stated. At BIO 2019, there were about 210 Taiwanese delegates present.

Hsu pointed out Beijing's communication titled "China Bullies Congressmen and Many Others" in a letter to The Wall Street Journal in October 2019. Global democracies should cooperate with Taiwan to oppose the intimidation of authoritarian governments since Taiwan is free and does not hold diverse viewpoints. In an effort to stop the 2019 coronavirus outbreak from spreading globally, Taiwan provided 3.4 million masks to the US in April 2020. Later in July, she was appointed as the secretary to the Ministry of Foreign Affairs. She was present when diplomatic representatives from Taiwan and the United States met in Washington in March 2022 to talk about Taiwan's increased participation in the UN system and other international forums.

In an increasingly heated exchange of words, Taiwan accused China for the first time on 26 May 2021, of obstructing a contract with Germany's BioNTech SE for COVID-19 vaccines. Beijing had offered the shots to the island through a Chinese business. Taiwan's Foreign Ministry secretary-general Hsu described the Chinese offer as "very divisive."

=== Belize ===
On 24 February 2023, Hsu and her husband arrived in Belize. Upon their arrival, they were greeted at the airport by Chinese expatriates. Thanking the Chinese expatriates for their kind greeting at the airport, she expressed her excitement about beginning a new career in the country. On 2 April 2023, she greeted and welcomed President Tsai's delegation amid their arrival at the Philip S. W. Goldson International Airport.

== Personal life ==
Hsu's mother was a justice judge of the Court of Justice, her husband, Tung Kuo-yu was a diplomat and former director of international organisations of the Ministry of Foreign Affairs, an undersecretary of government, and a representative to Belgium and the European Union. Her father was the general manager of the Taiwan Automobile Passenger Transport Company.

Diplomatic posts
Preceded by David K. C. Chien	Ambassador of the Republic of China to Belize; 24 February 2023–present	Succeeded by Incumbent
Preceded by Clark Chen	Representative of the Republic of China to Denmark; August 2012 – January 2016	Succeeded by Chuang Heng-sheng
