= Hsia Chi-ping =

Chinese general (1908–1977)

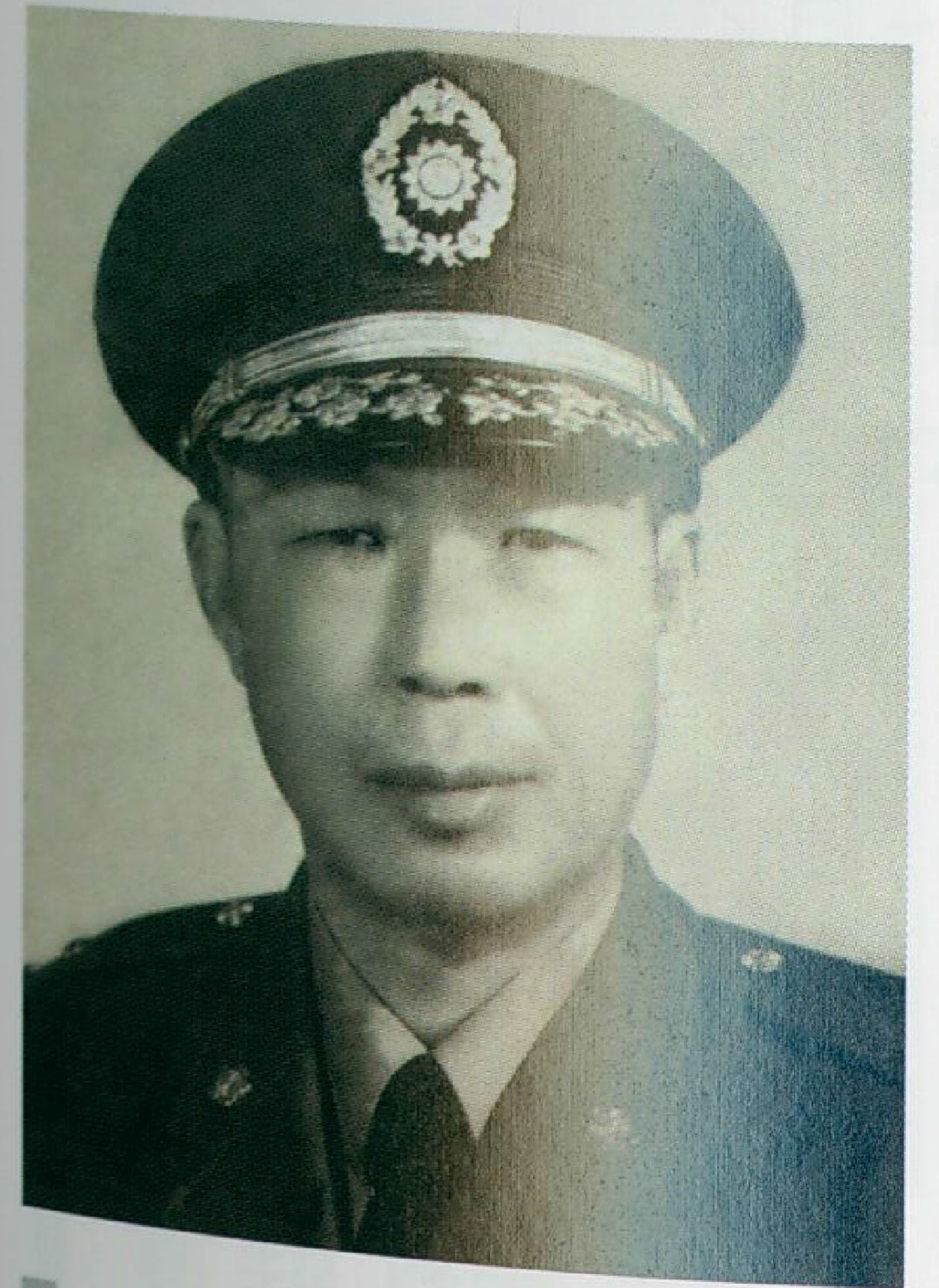
- Native name: 夏季屏
- Born: 1908; Wujin, Jiangsu, Qing dynasty
- Died: 30 November 1977 (aged 68–69) Taipei, Taiwan
- Allegiance: Republic of China
- Branch: (Republic of China (1912–1949)) National Revolutionary Army
- Conflicts: Second Sino-Japanese War; Chinese Civil War

Hsia Chi-ping (1908 – 30 November 1977), a native of Wujin, Jiangsu Province, was a military general of the Republic of China.

== Biography ==
In 1924, he graduated from Changzhou Middle School. In the winter of the same year, he was admitted to the third term of the Whampoa Military Academy and was introduced by Chen Jicheng to join the Kuomintang. In January 1926, he graduated from the third term of the Infantry Department of the Whampoa Military Academy. He served as the platoon leader, company leader, and battalion leader of the First Division. He participated in the Longtan, Xuzhou, and Canal battles and was seriously injured in his right arm. Soon he was promoted to regiment leader and participated in the Battle of Shanghai. He then went to Jiangxi, western Anhui, northern Hubei, southern Longnan, and northern Sichuan to pursue the Chinese Red Army. During the Second Sino-Japanese War, he served as the commander of the 565th Brigade, the commander of the 24th Division, and the deputy commander of the 29th Army. He participated in the Lanfeng Campaign, the Luoyang Campaign, and the counterattacks on Jinchengjiang, Liuzhou, and Guilin. After the war, he served as the commander of the Hangzhou Division Command Area.

In 1949, he went to Taiwan. He was subsequently assigned to the Dachen Islands and served as the commander of the Jiangsu-Zhejiang Anti-Communist National Salvation Army's Maritime Assault Corps. In 1955, he served as the major general commander of the Anti-Communist National Salvation Army's First Corps. In 1957, he was promoted to the commander of the Anti-Communist National Salvation Army's headquarters. In 1958, during the August 23rd Artillery Battle of Kinmen, he was ordered to lead the Anti-Communist National Salvation Army's First Corps to transport supplies from Penghu to Kinmen by motorboat. In 1960, he served as the deputy commander of the Penghu Defense Command. In December 1961, the Preparatory Office of the Battlefield Political Affairs Committee was established, and he was transferred to serve as the deputy director of the office. In 1963, he served as the deputy commander-in-chief of the Taiwan Garrison Headquarters. In 1964, he served as the director of the National Security Bureau. In 1967, he was promoted to the permanent deputy minister of the Ministry of National Defense of the Republic of China. In 1970, he served as the deputy chairman of the Battlefield Political Affairs Committee until the committee was ordered to be abolished in July 1972. He died in Taipei on November 30, 1977.
