= Taipei Representative Office, Copenhagen =

Taiwanese de facto embassy

Taipei Representative Office in Denmark 駐丹麥台北代表處
Agency overview
- Formed: 1980 (as Free China Information Office)
- Jurisdiction: Denmark; Iceland; Faroe Islands
- Headquarters: Copenhagen, Denmark
- Agency executive: Robin J.C. Cheng, Representative
- Website: Taipei Representative Office in Denmark

The Taipei Representative Office in Denmark; (Chinese: 駐丹麥台北代表處; pinyin: Zhù Dānmài Táiběi Dàibiǎo Chù) represents the interests of Taiwan in the Kingdom of Denmark and Iceland in the absence of formal diplomatic relations, functioning as a de facto embassy. Its counterpart in Taiwan is the Trade Council of Denmark in Taipei.

== History ==
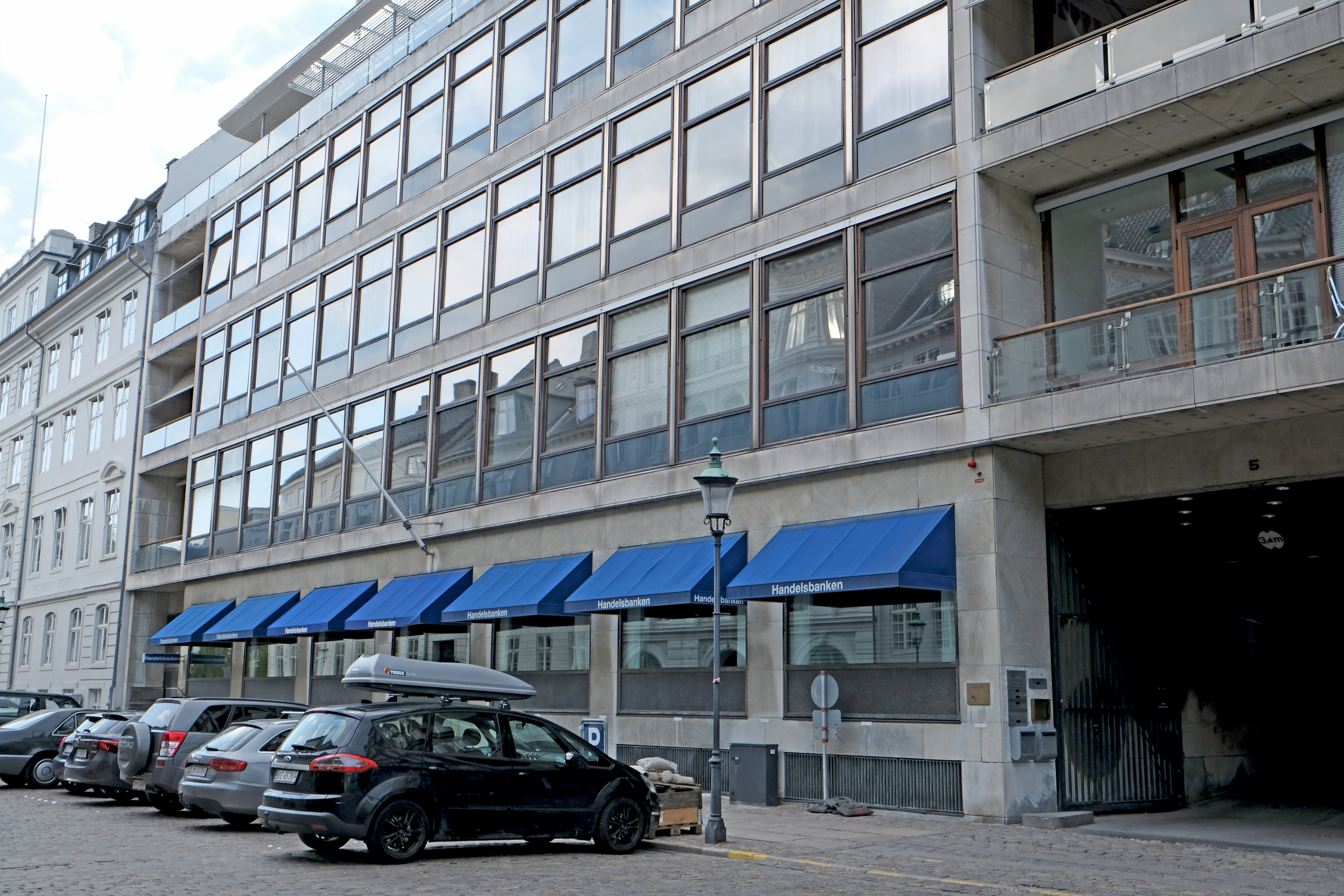
The Taipei Representative Office is located in Amaliegade 5A, also home to the Swedish Embassy to Denmark

The first representative office of Taiwan in Denmark was the Free China News Syndicate, established in 1973, which also covered the other Nordic countries. This was succeeded in 1980 by the Free China Information Office, while another body, known as the Far East Trade Office, was established by the Ministry of Economic Affairs. In 1991, the Free China Information Office were merged into the Taipei Economic and Cultural Office in Denmark, which adopted its present name in 1995. Since June 1995, it no longer has responsibility for Norway and the Baltic States, but has remained responsible for Taiwan's relations with Iceland, as well as Greenland and the Faroe Islands.

== Representatives ==
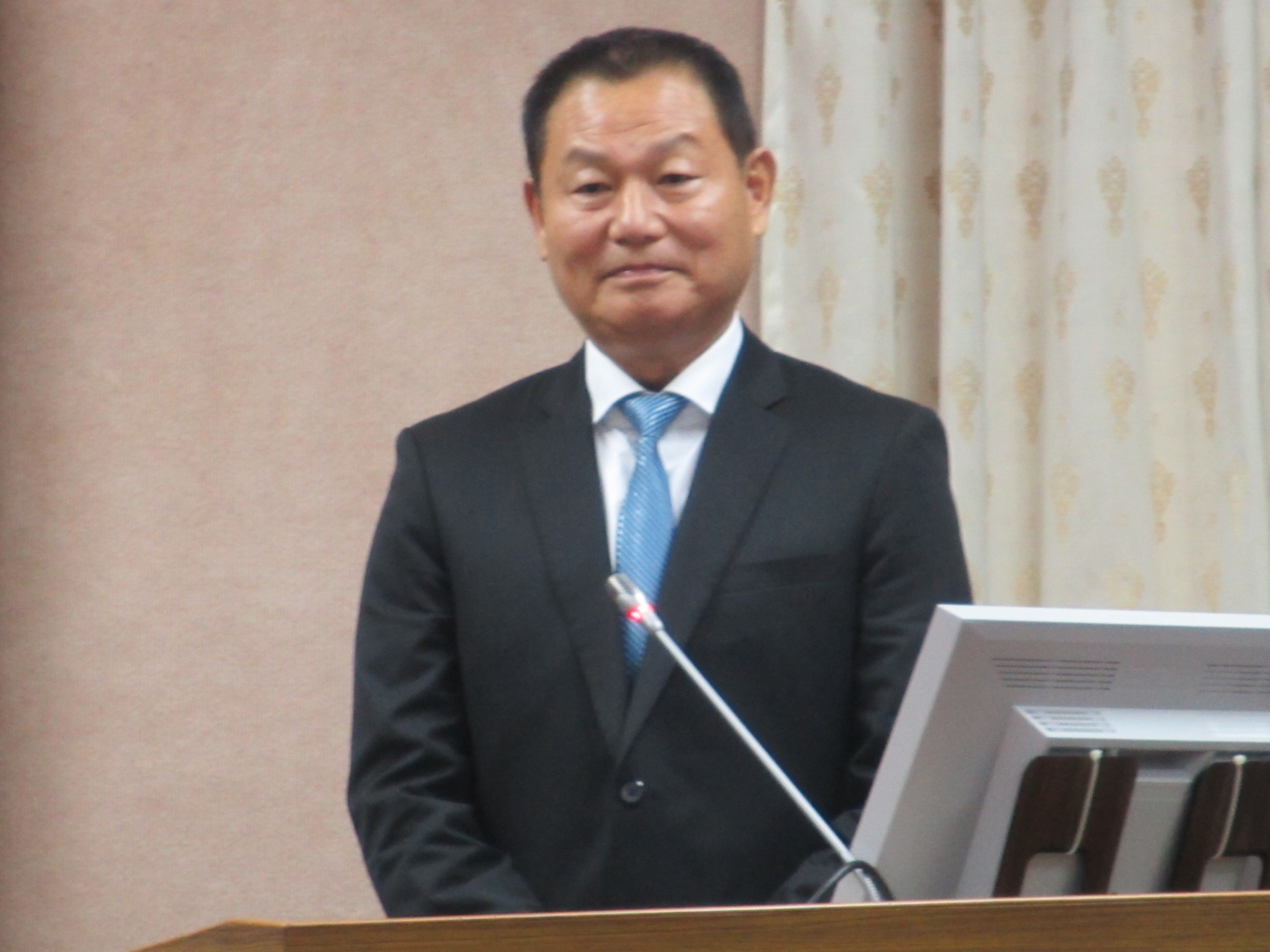
Lee Shying-jow, the incumbent ROC representative to Denmark.

The office is headed by a representative, currently Lee Shying-jow, the former Commanding General of the Republic of China Army.

- Stephan Hsu (1991 - May 1994)
- Chen Yu-chu (May 1994 – November 2000)
- Ku Fu-chang (November 2000 – February 2003)
- Frederic Chang (February 2003 – July 2007)
- Charles Liu (January 2008 – September 2009)
- Clark Chen (September 2009 – August 2012)
- Lily Li-Wen Hsu (August 2012 – January 2016)
- Chuang Heng-sheng (January 2016 – December 2018)
- Lee Shying-jow (December 2018 - September 2024)
- Robin J.C. Cheng (October 2024 -)

== See also ==
- Denmark–Taiwan relations
- List of diplomatic missions of Taiwan
- List of diplomatic missions in Denmark
