= Yang Kuo-chiang =

Chinese military leader

- 楊國強
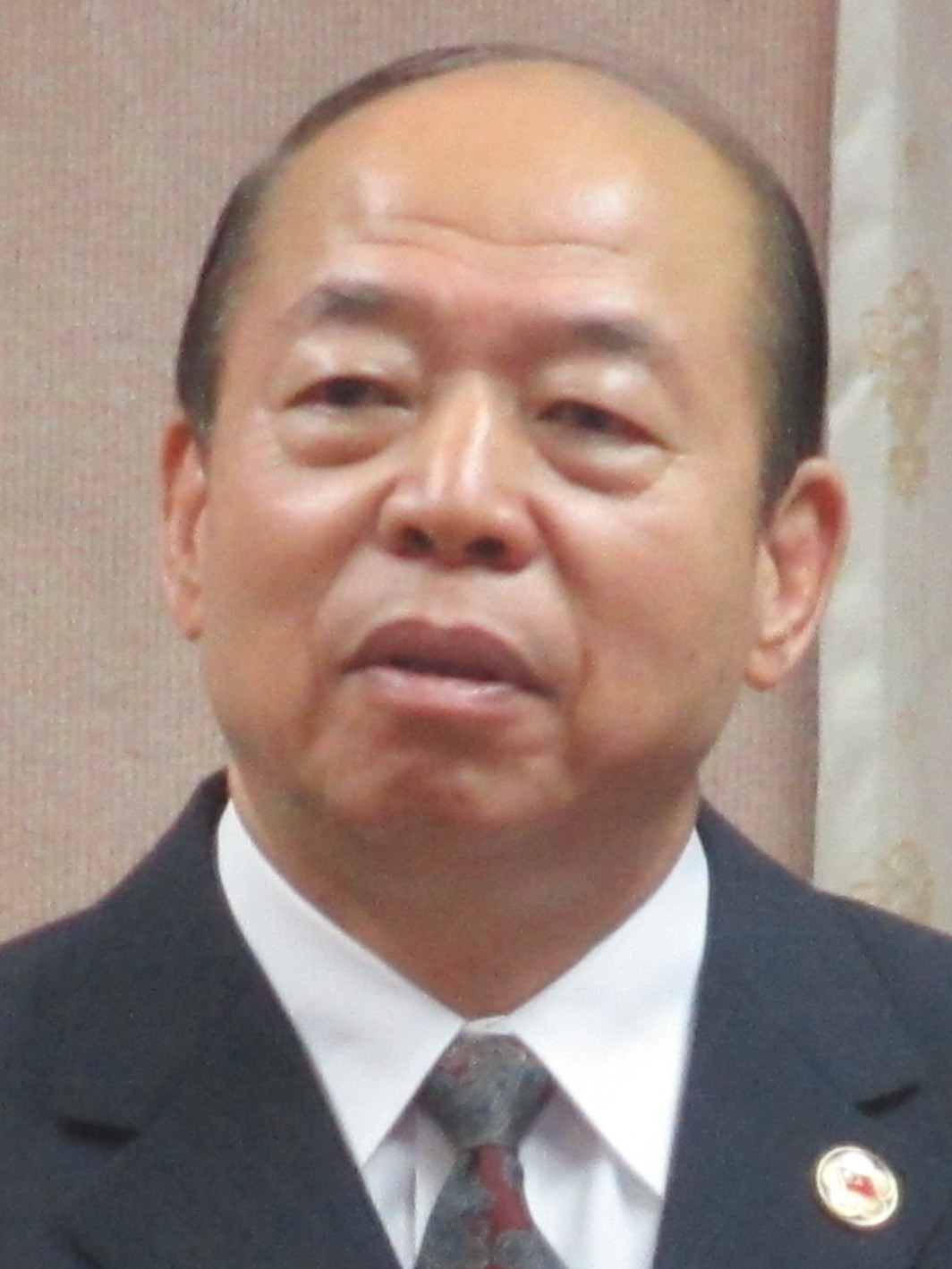

Director-General of National Security Bureau of the Republic of China
- In office 24 July 2015 – 19 October 2016
- Preceded by: Lee Shying-jow
- Succeeded by: Peng Sheng-chu

Personal details
- Born: 5 March 1950 (age 76)
- Education: Republic of China Military Academy (BS); National Defense University (MS)

Yang Kuo-chiang or John K. Young (Chinese: 楊國強; pinyin: Yáng Guóqiáng; born 5 March 1950) is a soldier of the Republic of China. He was the Director-General of the National Security Bureau in 2015–2016.

== Education ==
Yang graduated from Republic of China Military Academy in 1972. He then took the Armor Captain's Career Course from ROC Army School in 1975, Tank Gun Turret Maintenance Class from US Army Engineer School in 1980, Army Command and Staff College of National Defense University in 1983, Army Command and Staff College from the Republic of South Africa in 1985, War College of National Defense University in 1989, US Army War College in 1995 and Research Course of Harvard University Kennedy School of Government in 2004.

== Military careers ==
Yang was the Division Commander of the 109th Mechanized Division of the ROC Army, Inspector-General of the Military Discipline Division of the Ministry of National Defense General Political Warfare Department, Commander of Armor Training Command of the ROC Army Commandant of Armor School. He was also the superintendent for Republic of China Military Academy on 1 March 2002 - 30 June 2005.

== National Security Bureau ==
Yang was appointed as the Director-General of the National Security Bureau by President Ma Ying-jeou in July 2015 when his predecessor Lee Shying-jow resigned from the position citing personal and health reason. On 19 October 2016, Yang tendered his resignation to President Tsai Ing-wen citing that he believed that he has completed his mission during the government transitional period after Presiden Tsai was sworn in on 20 May 2016.

== See also ==
- National Security Council (Taiwan)
