= Vice presidential state car (Republic of China) =

Official car of the vice president of the Republic of China

The vice presidential state car of the Republic of China is the official car used by the Vice President during his/her official duty.

== Current state car ==
BMW 7 Series (G70)

Overview
- Manufacturer: BMW

Body and chassis
- Class: Full-size luxury car (F)

Chronology
- Predecessor: Audi A8 50 TDI quattro (D5, Typ 4N)

== Model ==
The model of the state car is the Audi A8 L Security Sedan which was delivered in October 2017.

== Specifications ==
The car is equipped with VR9 armor which can protect the occupant from rifle bullets up to 7.61x51 mm and hand grenade. The armor is made of steel, ceramic and aramid fiber. The car is equipped with emergency breathing apparatus and an automatic fire suppression system.

== Cost ==
The car cost about NT$24 million. However, the car was not purchased under the presidential car budget.

== See also ==
- Presidential state car (Republic of China)
