= Tung Kuo-yu =

Taiwanese politician

- 董國猷

ROC Representative to European Union and Belgium
- In office March 2013 – March 2017
- Preceded by: David Lin
- Succeeded by: Tseng Ho-jen

Deputy Minister of Foreign Affairs of the Republic of China
- In office October 2011 – March 2013
- Minister: Timothy Yang; David Lin
- Succeeded by: Joseph Shih

Personal details
- Spouse: Lily L. W. Hsu
- Education: National Chengchi University (BA); University of Houston (PhD)

Tung Kuo-yu (Chinese: 董國猷; pinyin: Dǒng Guóyóu) is a Taiwanese diplomat. From 2013 to 2017, he was the Representative of the Republic of China to the European Union and Belgium and previously served in the Ministry of Foreign Affairs.

== See also ==
- Foreign relations of the Republic of China
