= Institute for National Defense and Security Research =

Taiwanese think tank

- Abbreviation: INDSR
- Formation: May 1, 2018; 8 years ago
- Type: Think tank
- Website: indsr.org.tw

The Institute for National Defense and Security Research (INDSR) is a Taiwanese think tank based in Taipei. The Institute’s mission is to safeguard Taiwan's democracy and prosperity by strengthening mutual understanding and advancing common interests in the global and Taiwanese defense and security community. The institute is operated under the auspices of the government and the Legislative Yuan and, as of 2019, has a NT$125 million (US$4.2 million) annual budget.

It is considered to be the top military think tank in Taiwan. While it receives almost all of its funding from government sources INDSR is institutionally independent, nonpartisan, and nonprofit.

== History ==
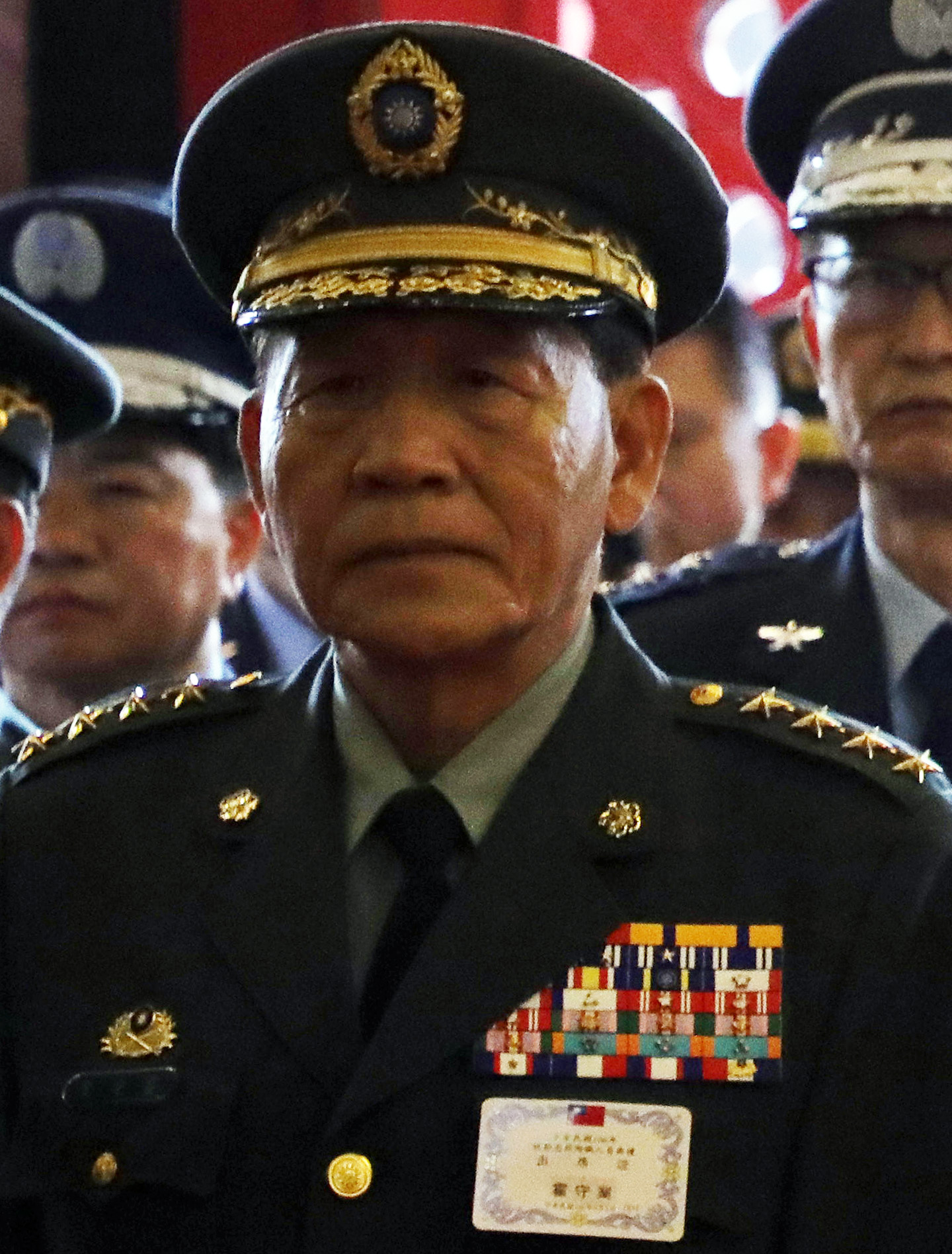
The incumbent Chairman of the INDSR, General Huoh Shoou-Yeh.

The Institute for National Defense and Security Research was inaugurated in May 2018 by Taiwanese President Tsai Ing-wen, former minister of national defense Feng Shih-kuan and representatives from government, industry, academia, and civil society. It was founded with seven research departments, one research center, and 64 employees. To start the Institute hired 17 researchers (all with PhDs) and 17 research assistants.

Lee Ting-Sheng, prior to 2024, was deputy executive director and executive director of the institute. Su Tzu-yun is the director of the institute's Division of Defense Strategy and Resources, as of 2026.

In 2026, the institute commissioned a survey by the National Chengchi University’s Election Study Center, with the institute publishing results that a majority believed improved Taiwan-US relations would strengthen national security.

As of 2026, it was a co-host for the inaugural Taiwan Defense Tech Hackathon. Also that year, it hosted the Taipei Security Dialogue.

Reuters refers to it in 2026 as "Taiwan's top military think tank."

== Organization ==
- Division of National Security Research
- Division of National Defense Strategies and Resources
- Division of Chinese Politics and Military Affairs
- Division of Cyber Security and Decision-Making Simulation

== Publications ==
=== Defense Security Brief ===
The Defense Security Brief (DSB) (國防安全) is an English language publication focused on security and military affairs. It was founded in 2011 and was compiled and published by the Office of Defense Studies, Ministry of National Defense until it was transferred to INDSR in 2018.

=== Defense Strategy and Assessment Journal ===
The Defense Strategy and Assessment Journal (戰略與評估) is a quarterly Chinese-language journal for defense and security research.

=== Defense Situation Monthly ===
The Defense Situation Monthly (國防情勢月報) is a monthly newsletter authored by INDSR experts.

=== Defense Security Weekly ===
The Defense Security Weekly (國防安全週報) is a weekly newsletter offering longer-form analysis by INDSR experts about news, security issues and trends of the preceding week. Distributed internally to government agencies and lawmakers.

=== Defense Security News ===
The Defense Security News (國防安全新聞) is a daily that focuses on global headlines and developments concerning China. Distributed internally to government agencies and lawmakers.

== See also ==
- Center for Strategic and International Studies
- RAND Corporation
- European Centre of Excellence for Countering Hybrid Threats
- List of think tanks
