= Denmark–Taiwan relations =

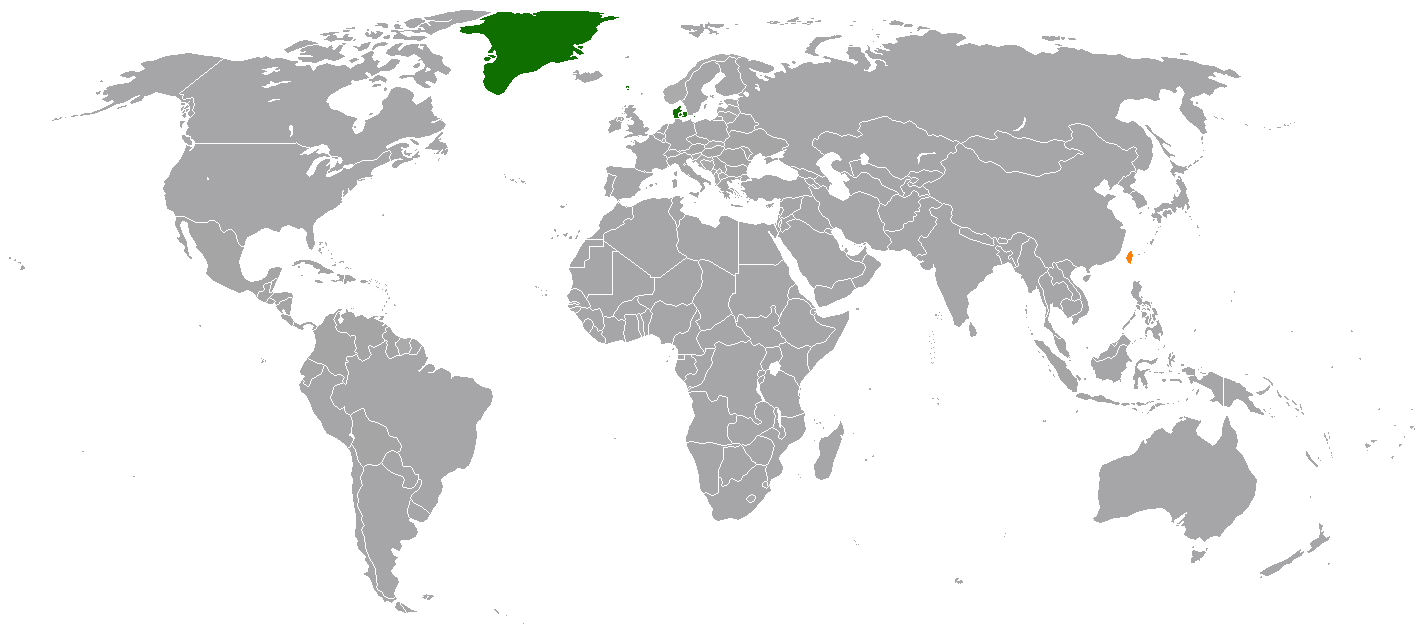
- Denmark: Taiwan

Diplomatic mission
- Trade Council of Denmark, Taipei: Taipei Representative Office in Denmark

Denmark–Taiwan relations are foreign relations between Denmark and Taiwan (officially the Republic of China, ROC). While Denmark only recognizes the People's Republic of China (PRC, commonly known as "China"), it maintains an informal trade council in Taipei. Taiwan maintains an informal representative office in Copenhagen. In 2005, both countries signed a tax treaty.

== History ==
Sino–Danish contacts began in 1674. Denmark and the Qing dynasty established relations in 1908.

On 9 January 1950, Denmark became one of the first European countries to recognize the PRC. While Denmark has continued to maintain unofficial relations with Taiwan, they have primarily been related to trade, culture, science and economic affairs.

== Political relations ==
The Danish People's Party's chairwoman, Pia Kjaersgaard, said that the friendship with Taiwan in the Folketing would help the understanding between Taiwan and Denmark. The Danish People's Party supports the restoration of Taiwan's United Nations membership, and also supports seeing Taiwan joining the World Health Organization.

In February 2025, Taiwanese residents living in Denmark held a protest outside the Danish Parliament against a new government policy that changed their nationality and place of birth from "Taiwan" to "China" in official documentation. This change was in effect from March 2024. The demonstration was organized by the NGO "Taiwan Corner", with protesters holding signs that read "We are from Taiwan, not China." This protest emphasizes the growing tensions in Denmark over identity rights and foreign policy toward Taiwan under pressure from China.

== Trade ==
In 1993, trade between Denmark and Taiwan amounted to US$206.5 million. Trade between Denmark and Taiwan has shown steady growth. From 2000 to 2005, it grew at the average annual growth rate of 15%, which makes Denmark Taiwan's most promising trade partner in Europe. In 2006, trade between the countries set a new record, at US$907.8 million. Denmark's major imports from Taiwan are mobile phones, bicycles and computer-related products. Taiwan's major imports from Denmark are wind turbines, machinery and medical instruments. Danish companies operating in Taiwan include Bang & Olufsen, Danfoss, Lego and Maersk.

== Science and technology ==
The Danish Technical Research Council and Taiwan's National Science Council signed an agreement in 2001 on cooperative research projects.

== See also ==
- Foreign relations of Denmark
- Foreign relations of Taiwan
