= 8th Army Corps (Republic of China) =

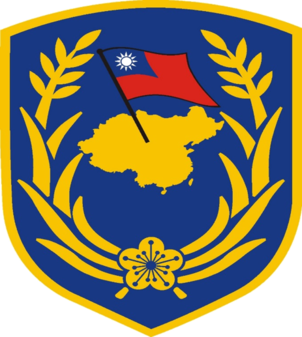
- Patch of the 8th Army Corps
- Active: 1979–present
- Country: Republic of China
- Branch: Republic of China Army
- Type: Corps

The 8th Army Corps is one of the major formations of the Republic of China Army and is tasked with defending southern Taiwan.

== History ==
The 8th Army Corps was formed in July 1979 on the basis of the Army training and combat development headquarters.

In 2021 it was announced that the corps will become part of the 4th Combat Theater Command.

== Organization ==
The 8th Army Corps Headquarters was renamed the 8th Army Corps Command in 2006.

The structure of the corps is as follows:

- 333rd Mechanized Infantry Brigade
- 564th Armored Brigade
- 43rd Artillery Command
- 54th Engineer Group
- 75th Signals Group
- 39th Chemical Warfare Group
