= National Security Bureau (Taiwan) =

Intelligence agency of the Republic of China (Taiwan)

- 國家安全局; Guójiā Ānquán Jú (Mandarin); Kok-ka An-choân Kio̍k (Taiwanese Hokkien); Koet-kâ Ôn-chhiòn Khiu̍k (Hakka)

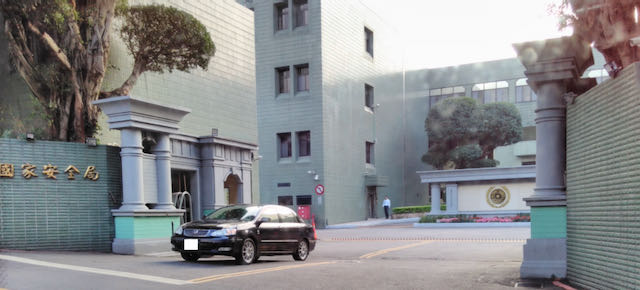
- Entrance of the Headquarters of the Ministry of Justice

Agency overview
- Formed: 1 March 1955
- Preceding agency: Bureau of Investigation and Statistics
- Jurisdiction: Republic of China (Taiwan)
- Headquarters: Shilin, Taipei
- Motto: 安如磐石 (As secure as a rock)
- Agency executives: Tsai Ming-yen, Director-General; Chou Mei-wu (周美伍), Kuo Chung-hsin (郭崇信), Wang Teh-ling (王德麟), Deputy Directors-General
- Parent agency: National Security Council
- Website: www.nsb.gov.tw

The National Security Bureau (NSB; Chinese: 國家安全局; pinyin: Guójiā Ānquán Jú) is the principal intelligence agency of the Republic of China (Taiwan).

== History ==
The organization was created in 1955 by a ROC Presidential Directive from Chiang Kai-shek, to supervise and coordinate all security-related administrative organizations, military agencies and KMT organizations in Taiwan. Earlier, the bureau was nicknamed "China's CIA" or "CCIA".

The first Director-General of National Security Bureau was a three-star army general Cheng Chieh-min, with a background in military intelligence, who once was the deputy of the controversial Bureau of Investigation and Statistics of the National Military Council. (The "Military-Statistics Bureau" served under Dai Li, and even assumed command the "Military-Statistics Bureau" after the death of Dai Li in March 1946. As a result, the National Security Bureau is often seen as one of several successors to the Military-Statistics Bureau.)

Initially, National Security Bureau did not have its own field officers or operatives. However, in order to strengthen its ability to guide and coordinate other intelligence agencies, NSB soon developed its own field intelligence officers and training pool.

The National Security Bureau was involved in the 1980 murder of lawyer and opposition politician Lin I-hsiung and his family.

=== Legalization ===
On 1 January 1994, shortly after the respective organic laws of the National Security Council and NSB were promulgated by the order of the ROC President Lee Teng-hui on 30 December 1993, the National Security Bureau became a legal institution.

=== Recent events ===
Though a few known intelligence failures of the National Security Bureau have surfaced in recent years, supporters have pointed out that the agency rarely, if ever, publicizes any successful operations.

On 1 June 2000, a former NSB official who was a retired one-star army general made a personal visit to the PRC and was detained three days later by the PRC Ministry of State Security.

A former chief cashier of NSB, Liu Kuan-chun (劉冠軍), was suspected of embezzling more than NT$192 million (US$5.65 million) from money returned from the Ministry of Foreign Affairs on 4 April 1999. According to the National Bureau of Investigation, Ministry of Justice, Liu left the country on 3 September 2000, for Shanghai, PRC. He reappeared in Bangkok in January 2002 and then went to North America. Liu remains a fugitive.

In the afternoon of 19 March 2004, President Chen Shui-bian and Vice President Annette Lu were wounded by gunfire the day before the presidential election, while campaigning in Tainan in what would later to become known as the March 19 shooting incident. Afterwards, the Control Yuan impeached nine officials for dereliction of duty, including former National Security Bureau (NSB) chief Tsai Chao-ming (蔡朝明) and former deputy chief of the NSB special service center Chiu Chung-nan (邱忠男). The Control Yuan said in an impeachment report that the National Security Bureau had received information on 18 March 2004 about a possible attack on the president but did not take the report seriously.

In 2004, former US State Department Deputy Assistant Secretary Donald W. Keyser was arrested by the FBI for illegally handing over documents to two Taiwanese NSB officials who served as intelligence liaison officers in USA. Immediately, the director general of the NSB, General Hsueh Shih-ming, recalled crucial intelligence agents from the United States.

The loyalty of NSB officials to the Democratic Progressive Party is constantly questioned. Traditionally, career personnel of law enforcement, intelligence agencies, and military organizations in Taiwan are labeled as pan-blue because most of them have been lifelong Kuomintang members. However, while the DPP is in power, the National Security Bureau has been attacked by the KMT and People First Party for alleged abuses of power. Despite statements from several NSB Directors General on the political neutrality of the organization, some controversial events have still occurred.

In 2004, Chen Feng-lin (陳鳳麟), a colonel of the logistics department, Special Service Center, National Security Bureau, confessed that he leaked classified information regarding security measures at President Chen Shui-bian's residence as well as the president's itinerary to Peng Tzu-wen (彭子文), a former director of the center who retired as a major general. Peng, a retired one-star general, revealed on TV that he would not "take a bullet for President Chen." In August 2005, Peng Tzu-wen was indicted for leaking national secrets on TV and for potentially putting Chen's life in jeopardy.

In April 2025, the NSB reported an uptick in disinformation by the Chinese Communist Party compared to the previous year, including increased use of artificial intelligence.

In June 2026, the NSB launched a webpage for Chinese nationals to provide intelligence tips.

== Structure ==
The National Security Bureau is subordinate to the National Security Council (NSC). Under the chain of command, the NSC is under the direct administration of the President. However, the Director-General of the National Security Bureau usually can and does report directly to the President, bypassing the NSC.

=== Chiefs ===
Traditionally, the successive bureau chiefs were exclusively military officers with the rank of three-star general, though this has changed in recent years. In 2003, President Chen Shui-bian appointed Wang Ginn-wang, a former Director-General of National Police Agency with a career police background, to the post of NSB Deputy Director-General. In 2007, Shi Hwei-yow, a former judge from the Taipei district court, former Director-General of the Coast Guard Administration, and at the time the Deputy Director-General of NSB, replaced a three-star army general (Hsueh Shih-ming) as the first civilian Director-General of National Security Bureau.

=== Field Divisions ===
As result of institutionalizing operations, the NSB now has six intelligence-related divisions:

1. International intelligence
2. Intelligence within the area of People's Republic of China
3. Intelligence within the area of Taiwan
4. Analysis of the nation's strategic intelligence
5. Scientific and technological intelligence and telecommunications security
6. Control and development of secret codes (the matrix) and facilities
7. Armed Forces Internet Security

=== Centers ===
The NSB has three centers:

1. Special Service Command Center (特種勤務指揮中心): Presidential Security and Protection
2. Telecommunication Technology Center (code name Breeze Garden, zh:清風園)
3. Training Center

=== Oversight ===
After martial law was lifted, the NSB has also taken charge of planning special tasks, and it is responsible for guiding, coordinating, and supporting the intelligence affairs in military and civil categories:

==== Military ====
The Military Intelligence Bureau, General Staff Headquarters, Ministry of National Defense (MND)
Office of Telecommunication Development, General Staff Headquarters, Ministry of National Defense (MND)
General Political Warfare Bureau, Ministry of National Defense (MND)
The Military Security General Corps, General Staff Headquarters, MND (Formerly, the Counter Intelligence General Corps of General Political Warfare Bureau, NMD)
The Military Police Command, Ministry of National Defense (MND)

==== Civil ====
The National Police Agency of the Ministry of the Interior
The National Immigration Agency of the Ministry of the Interior
Bureau of Investigation of the Ministry of Justice
The Coast Guard Administration of Executive Yuan.

== Directors-General ==
- Cheng Chieh-ming (August 1954 – 11 December 1959)
- Chen Ta-ching (12 December 1959 – 30 November 1962)'
- Hsia Chi-ping (1 December 1962 – 30 June 1967)
- Chou Chung-feng (1 July 1967 – 30 June 1972)
- Wang Yung-shu (1 July 1972 – 30 November 1981)
- Wang Ching-hsu (1 December 1981 – 14 December 1985)
- Song Hsin-lien (15 December 1985 – 31 July 1993)
- Yin Tsung-wen (1 August 1993 – 31 January 1999)
- Ting Yu-chou (1 February 1999 – 15 August 2001)
- Tsai Chao-ming (16 August 2001 – 31 March 2004)
- Hsueh Shih-ming (1 April 2004 – 6 February 2007)
- Shi Hwei-yow (7 February 2007 – 19 June 2008)
- Tsai Chao-ming (20 June 2008 – 10 March 2009)
- Tsai De-sheng (11 March 2009 – 11 May 2014; acting until 30 April 2009)
- Lee Shying-jow (12 May 2014 – 23 July 2015)
- Yang Kuo-chiang (24 July 2015 – 25 October 2016)
- Peng Sheng-chu (26 October 2016 – 22 July 2019)
- Ko Cheng-heng (23 July 2019) (acting)
- Chiu Kuo-cheng (24 July 2019 – 22 February 2021)
- Chen Ming-tong (23 February 2021 – 31 January 2023)
- Tsai Ming-yen (31 January 2023 – present)

== See also ==
- National Security Council (Taiwan)
- Military Intelligence Bureau
