= Republic of China Military Academy =

Military academy of the Republic of China

Coordinates: 22°37′09.0″N 120°21′56.2″E

- 中華民國陸軍軍官學校
- Former names: Whampoa Military Academy (1924–1926); Central Military Academy (1927–1949)
- Motto: Fraternity, Devotion, Sincerity
- Type: Service academy
- Established: May 1, 1924; 102 years ago
- Superintendent: Maj. Gen. Chang Chieh (張捷)
- Location: Fengshan District, Kaohsiung, Taiwan
- Campus: Suburban
- Website: www.rocma.edu.tw

Republic of China Military Academy
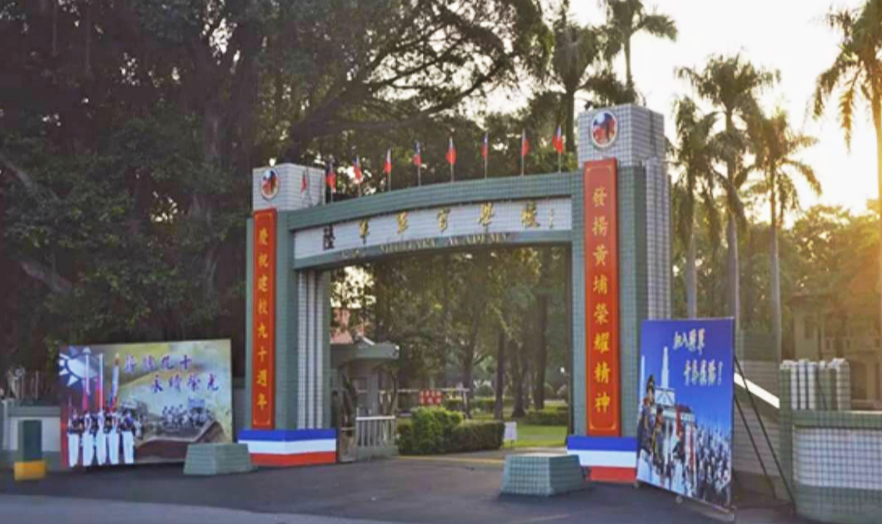
- Main gate
- Traditional Chinese: 中華民國陸軍軍官學校
- Simplified Chinese: 中华民国陆军军官学校
- Literal meaning: Republic of China Army Officer School
Transcriptions
Standard Mandarin
- Hanyu Pinyin: Zhōnghúa Mīngúo Lùjūn Jūnguān Xúexiào
- Wade–Giles: Chung-hua Min-kuo Lu-chün Chün-kuan Hsüeh-hsiao
Southern Min
- Hokkien POJ: Tiong-hôa Bîn-kok Lio̍k-kun Kun-koaⁿ Ha̍k-hāu

abbreviation
- Traditional Chinese: 陸軍官校
- Simplified Chinese: 陆军官校
- Literal meaning: Army Officer School
Transcriptions
Standard Mandarin
- Hanyu Pinyin: Lùjūn Guānxiào
- Wade–Giles: Lu-chün Kuan-hsiao
Southern Min
- Hokkien POJ: Lio̍k-kun Koaⁿ-hāu

Whampoa Military Academy
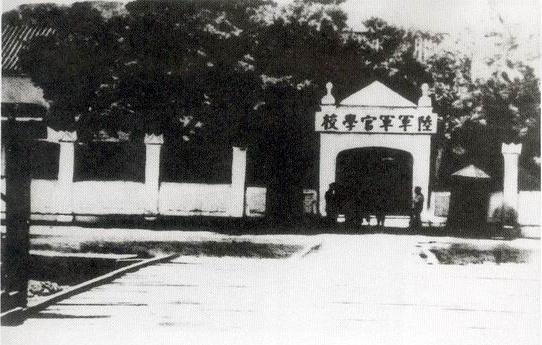
- Main gate
- Traditional Chinese: 黃埔軍校
- Simplified Chinese: 黄埔军校
- Literal meaning: Yellow Port Army School
Transcriptions
Standard Mandarin
- Hanyu Pinyin: Huángpǔ Jūnxiào
- Wade–Giles: Huang-p'u Chün-hsiao
Southern Min
- Hokkien POJ: N̂g-po͘ Kun-hāu

The Republic of China Military Academy (Chinese: 中華民國陸軍軍官學校; pinyin: Zhōnghúa Mīngúo Lùjūn Jūnguān Xúexiào), also known as the Chinese Military Academy (CMA), is the service academy for the Republic of China Army, located in Kaohsiung, Taiwan. It was founded as the Whampoa Military Academy in Whampoa, Canton (present day Huangpu, Guangzhou), in 1924.

At the end of the Chinese Civil War, the academy moved to Taiwan and assumed its current name. Its graduates participated in the Northern Expedition, the Second Sino-Japanese War and the Chinese Civil War.

== Establishment ==
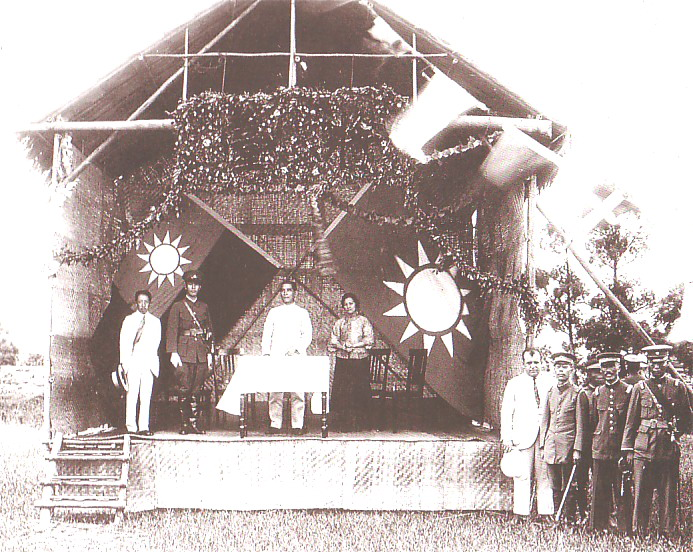
The founding ceremony in 1924. On the stage are Sun Yat-sen, behind the table, and Chiang Kai-shek, in uniform.

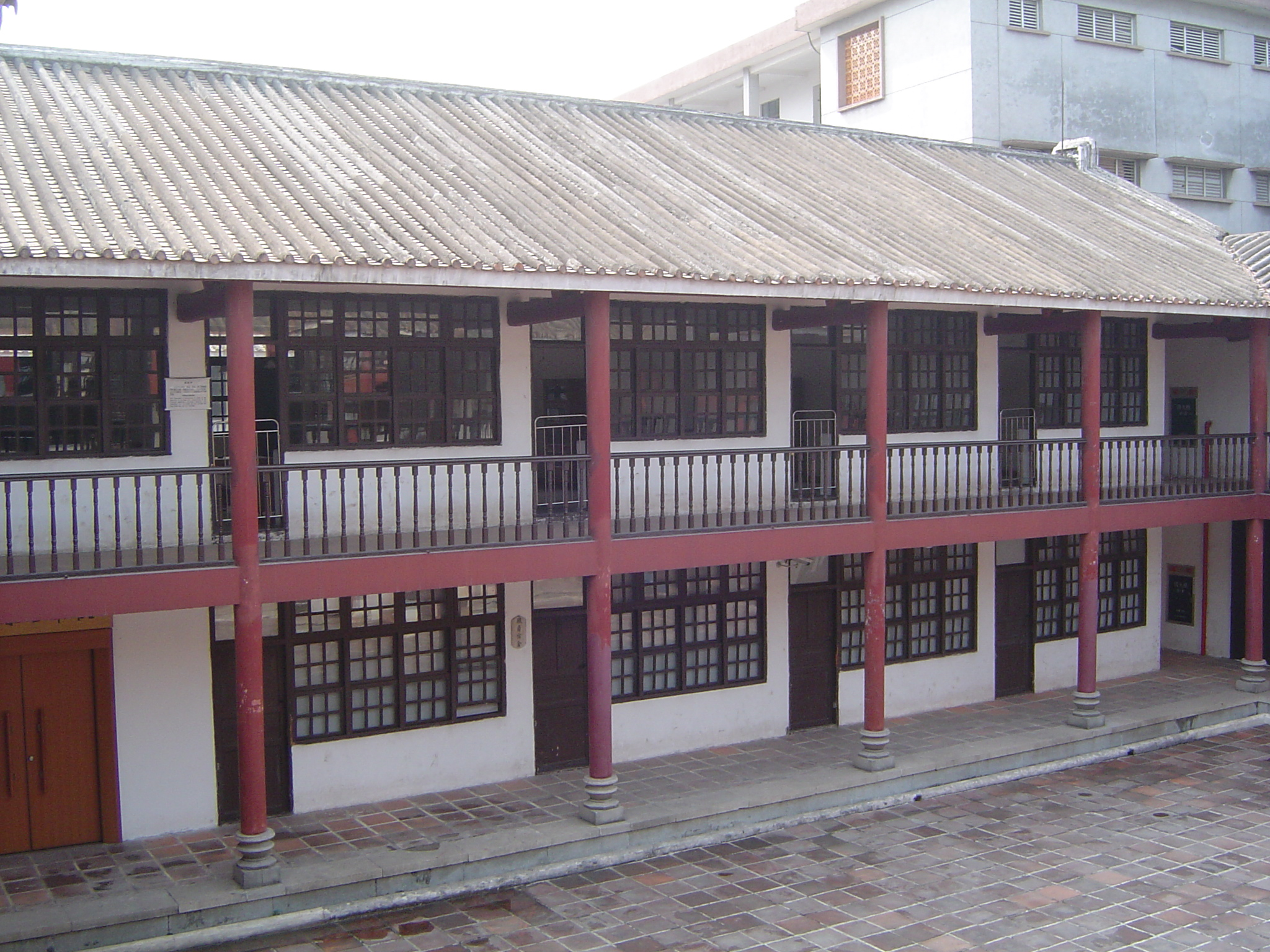
Whampoa buildings in 2005

By 1924, the Kuomintang (KMT) wanted to build a modern, and politically reliable armed force. The KMT received money, materiel, and advisors from the Soviet Union; military advisors provided training and began reorganizing the KMT's forces along Soviet lines. As part of the reforms, political commissars were introduced for political and technical training and, in 1924, the KMT's 1st National Congress approved the creation of the Whampoa Military Academy to train junior officers for the what would become the National Revolutionary Army (NRA). The academy was established in May 1924 on Dane's Island (present day Changzhou Island) in Huangpu, Guangzhou with Chiang Kai-shek as superintendent. Liao Zhongkai, the KMT treasury secretary, was the party's representative to the academy. Sun Yat-sen took the ceremonial position of the academy's premier.

== Early years ==
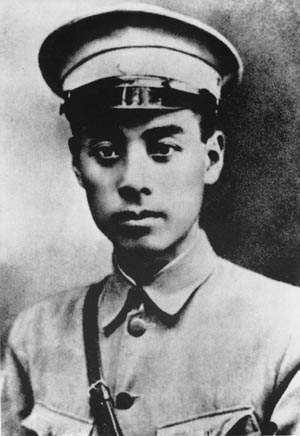
Zhou Enlai as director of the academy's political department in 1924

The Chinese faculty included graduates from the Baoding Military Academy, the Yunnan Military Academy, and the Imperial Japanese Army Academy. There were also a small number of Soviet instructors trained at the Frunze Military Academy; they were the academy's primary instructors. Members of the Chinese Communist Party (CCP) were admitted as faculty and students as part of the First United Front. The political instructors were mostly Communists, as was their director, Zhou Enlai. The later People's Liberation Army also recruited Whampoa graduates.

The academy's provided a 6-12 month military-political program incorporating Western pedagogical methods and practical exercises. Military training was primarily infantry-focused, but also included classes for artillery, engineers, logistics, and heavy weapons. Political training was based on Sun Yat-sen's Three Principles of the People, KMT history, and Western politics and economics. The program was inferior to those provided by contemporary professional armies, but it gave the NRA an advantage over the less professional Chinese armies of the Warlord Era. The first class of 490 graduated in November.

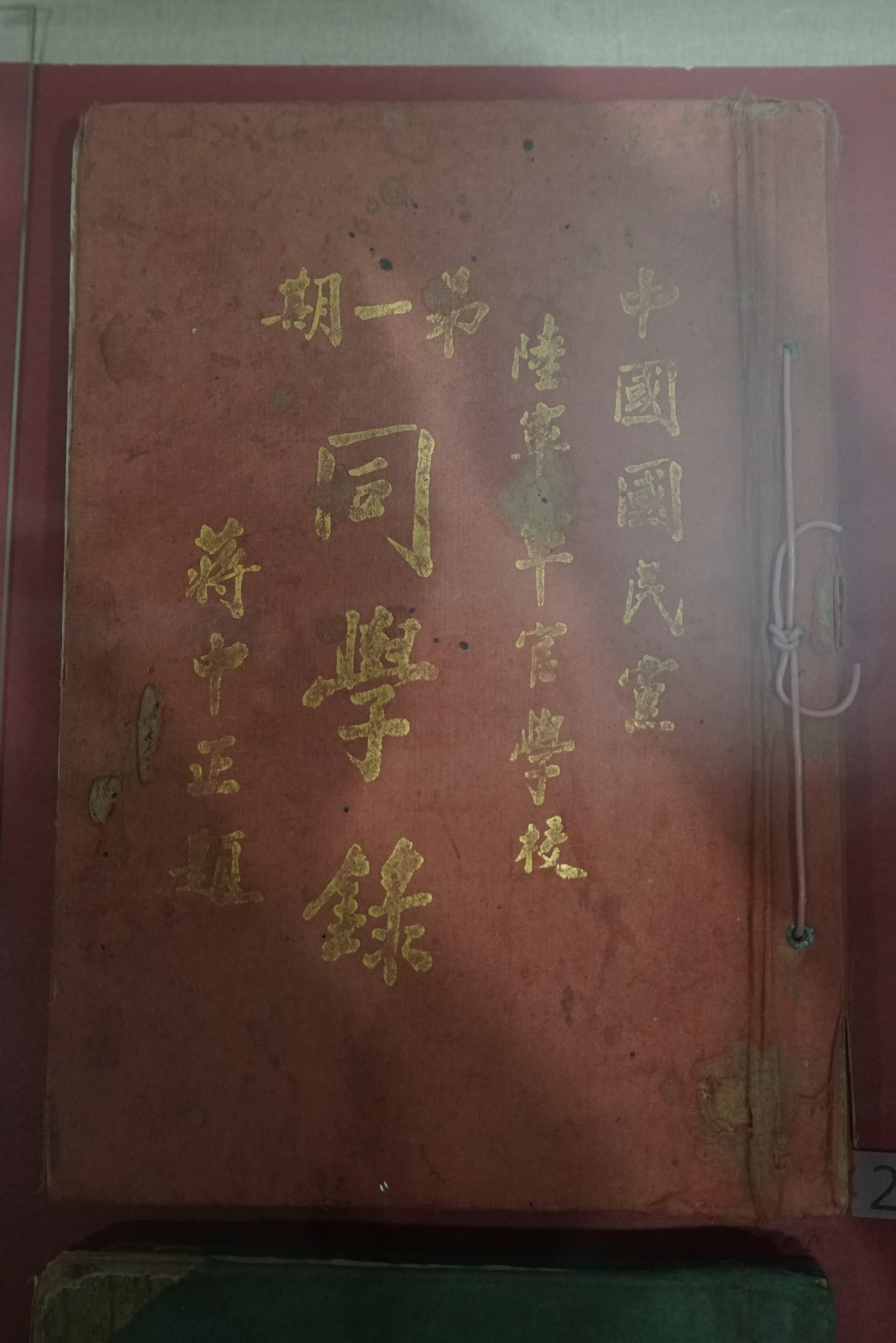
Alumni record of the first group students of Republic of China Military Academy.

The academy formed the first "model" regiment in October 1924, which suppressed an insurrection of angry merchants and their private militia forces late that month. The Whampoa force operated successfully during the Guangdong–Guangxi War and the Yunnan–Guangxi War before becoming the foundation of the NRA.

By the start of the Second Sino-Japanese War in 1937 the majority of Chinese divisions were commanded by Whampoa graduates.

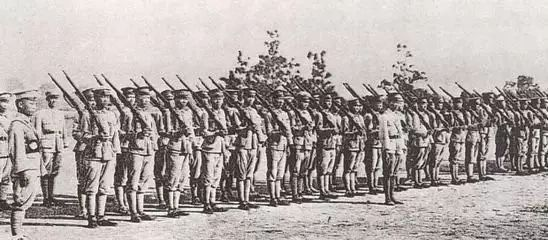
Training at Whampoa.

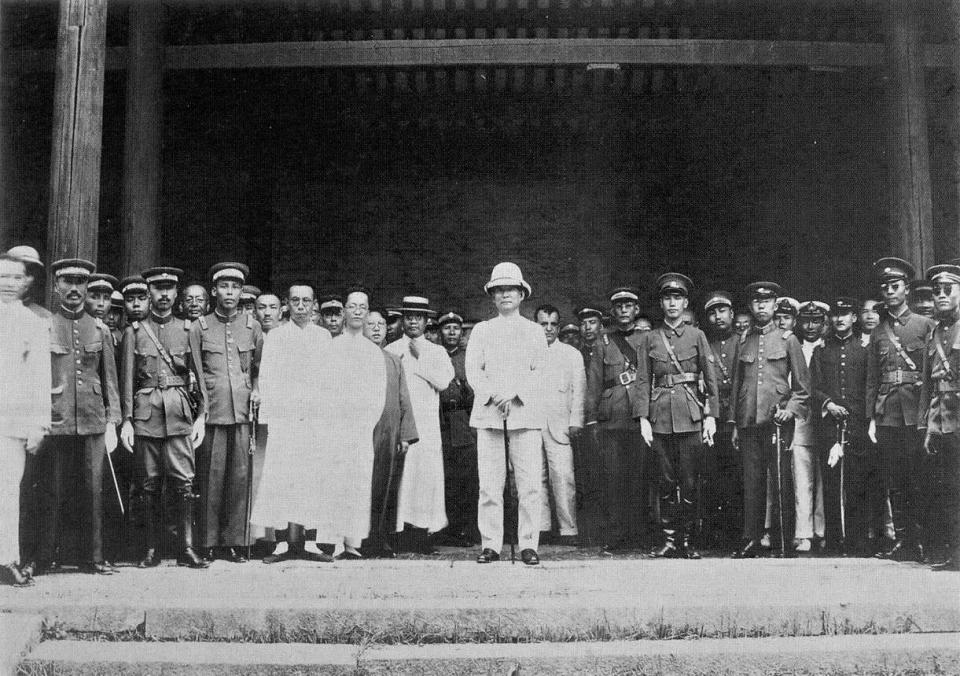
Sun Yat-sen standing with various Whampoa officers in the opening ceremony

== Relocations ==
Flag of the ROCMA

The original academy operated until 1926. In 1928, following the Northern Expedition, it was relocated to Nanjing, the new capital, and renamed as the Central Military Academy. The CMA evacuated to Chengdu in 1938 during the Second Sino-Japanese War.

At the end of the Chinese Civil War, the CMA evacuated to Kaohsiung on Taiwan and was renamed to the Republic of China Military Academy.

The site of the Whampoa Military Academy is now a museum.

== In Taiwan ==
In June 2024, President Lai Ching-te visited the ROC Military Academy on the occasion of its 100th anniversary celebration.

== List of superintendents ==
Note: "class year" refers to the alumnus's class year, which usually is the same year they graduated. However, in times of war, classes often graduate early.
A "—" in the class year column indicates a superintendent who is not an alumnus of the Academy.

#	Start	End	Name	Photo	Class year	Notability
1.	2 May 1924	October 1947	Chiang Kai-shek		—	Generalissimo; 1st president of the Republic of China
2.	October 1947	September 1949	Lt. Gen. Guan Linzheng (關麟徵)		—	General; ROC Army Commander-in-Chief
3.	September 1949	December 1949	Lt. Gen. Chang Yao-ming (張耀明)		1924	Lieutenant general; superintendent of the ROC Military Academy
4.	October 1950	31 October 1954	Lt. Gen. Lo Yu-lun (羅友倫)		1929	General; ROC Combined Services Force Commander-in-Chief
5.	1 September 1954	31 March 1957	Lt. Gen. Hsieh Chao-chih (謝肇齊)		1929	Lieutenant general; vice president of the Army, Navy and Air Force Joint Staff University
6.	1 April 1957	31 December 1960	Lt. Gen. Hsu Ju-cheng (徐汝誠)		1929	Lieutenant general; deputy chief of the General Staff for Operations, MND-GSH
7.	1 January 1961	March 1965	Lt. Gen. Ai Ai (艾靉)		1926	Lieutenant general; deputy executive Minister of National Defense
8.	March 1965	31 March 1970	Lt. Gen. Chang Li-fu (張立夫)		1929	Lieutenant general; superintendent of the ROC Military Academy
9.	1 April 1970	February 1973	Lt. Gen. Lin Chu-yao (林初耀)		1933	Lieutenant general; superintendent of the ROC Military Academy
10.	February 1973	31 March 1976	Lt. Gen. Chin Tsu-hsi (秦祖熙)		1937	Lieutenant general; superintendent of the ROC Military Academy
11.	1 April 1976	December 1977	Lt. Gen. Yen Pai-chien (言百謙)		1941	General; director of the Joint Operations Training Department, MND
12.	December 1977	December 1979	Lt. Gen. Hsu Li-nung (許歷農)		1939	General; director of the General Political Warfare Department, MND
13.	December 1979	30 June 1981	Lt. Gen. Chu Chih-yuan (朱致遠)		1939	Lieutenant general; ROC Army Vice Commander-in-Chief
14.	1 July 1981	30 June 1983	Lt. Gen. Lu Kuang-yi (盧光義)		1949	Lieutenant general; director of the Military Intelligence Bureau, MND
15.	1 July 1983	30 June 1985	Lt. Gen. Huang Hsing-chiang (黃幸強)		1949	General; ROC Army Commander-in-Chief
16.	1 July 1985	December 1986	Lt. Gen. Huang Yao-yu (黃耀羽)		1952	Lieutenant general; deputy director-general of the National Security Bureau
17.	December 1986	30 June 1989	Lt. Gen. Tang Yuan-pu (湯元普)		1960	Lieutenant general; superintendent of the ROC Military Academy
18.	1 July 1989	60 June 1991	Lt. Gen. Hu Chia-chi (胡家麒)		1961	Lieutenant general; superintendent of the ROC Military Academy
19.	1 July 1991	September 1993	Lt. Gen. Yang Te-chih (楊德智)		1964	General; ROC Combined Services Force Commander-in-Chief
20.	September 1993	July 1996	Lt. Gen. Ma Teng-ho (馬登鶴)		1960	Lieutenant general; ROC Combined Services Force Vice Commander-in-Chief
21.	July 1996	July 1997	Lt. Gen. Tung Chao-yang (童兆陽)		1965	Lieutenant general; ROC Army Vice Commander-in-Chief
22.	July 1997	January 1998	Lt. Gen. Ting Yu-chou (丁渝洲)		1966	General; secretary-general of the National Security Council
23.	January 1998	28 February 2002	Lt. Gen. Chang Yueh-heng (張岳衡)		1965	Lieutenant general; superintendent of the ROC Military Academy
24.	1 March 2002	30 June 2005	Lt. Gen. Yang Kuo-chiang (楊國強)		1972	Lieutenant general; incumbent director-general of the National Security Bureau
25.	1 July 2005	30 June 2006	Lt. Gen. Wang Ken-lin (王根林)		1971	Lieutenant general; superintendent of the ROC Military Academy
acting	1 July 2006	31 July 2006	Lt. Gen. Chia Fu-yi (賈輔義)		1970	Lieutenant general; superintendent of the ROC Military Academy (acting); The rank of the superintendent was demoted from lieutenant general to major general by the disarmaments policy of the then President Chen Shui-bian.
26.	1 October 2006	July 2010	Maj. Gen. Chen Liang-pei (陳良沛)		1979	Major general; superintendent of the ROC Military Academy
27.	July 2010	30 June 2012	Maj. Gen. Chuan Tzu-jui (全子瑞)		1981	Lieutenant general; incumbent ROC Army Chief of Staff
28.	1 July 2012	February 2015	Maj. Gen. Liu Te-king (劉得金)		1983	Lieutenant general; incumbent director of the Telecommunications Development Office, MND-GSH
29.	February 2015	present	Maj. Gen. Chang Chieh (張捷)		1985	Major general; incumbent superintendent of the ROC Military Academy

== Faculties ==
- Center for General Education
- Department of Civil Engineering
- Department of Physics
- Department of Foreign Languages
- Department of Political Science
- Department of Management Science
- Department of Chemistry
- Department of Electrical Engineering
- Department of Mechanical Engineering
- Department of Information Management

== Notable alumni ==
- Lee Shying-jow, Minister of Veterans Affairs Council (2016–2018)
- Lin Biao, Marshal of the People's Republic of China
- Justin Yifu Lin, Chief Economist of the World Bank
- Ma Zhongying, Ma clique warlord

== Transportation ==
The academy is within walking distance south of Dadong Station of the Kaohsiung MRT.

== See also ==
- List of schools in the Republic of China reopened in Taiwan
- National Chengchi University, the civil counterpart of the Whampoa Military Academy
- Republic of China Naval Academy
- Republic of China Air Force Academy
