= Capture of the Tuapse =

1954 capture of Soviet tanker by ROC Navy

History

Soviet Union
- Name: Tuapse (Russian: Туапсе)
- Owner: Black Sea Shipping Company
- Port of registry: Odessa, Soviet Union
- Builder: Burmeister & Wain, Copenhagen, Denmark
- Launched: 1953
- Fate: Captured by the ROC Navy in 1954

Republic of China
- Name: ROCS Kuaiji, AOG-306 (會稽)
- Acquired: 23 June 1954
- Commissioned: 20 October 1955
- Decommissioned: 1 October 1965

General characteristics
- Class & type: Apsheron-class, oil tanker
- Tonnage: 13,200 DWT
- Displacement: 18,000 t (17,716 long tons)
- Length: 149.14 m (489 ft 4 in)
- Beam: 19.16 m (62 ft 10 in)
- Draft: 8.36 m (27.4 ft)
- Propulsion: 6DKR 74/160, 5,530 shp (4,120 kW)
- Speed: 14.5 knots (16.7 mph; 26.9 km/h)
- Range: 7 knots (8.1 mph; 13 km/h)
- Complement: 49
- Armament: None

The capture of the tanker Tuapse occurred on 23 June 1954, when a civilian Soviet ship was captured and confiscated by the Republic of China Navy in the high seas near the Philippines and the sailors were detained in Taiwan for various periods with three deaths, until the last four were released in 1988.

== Background ==
On 18 June 1949 during the Chinese Civil War, the Government of the Republic of China (ROC) declared the Closed Port Policy to establish an actual aerial and naval blockade of trade with the People's Republic of China (PRC) along the Chinese coast from Liao River to Min River area, which was extended to include Guangdong on 12 February 1950. The Executive Yuan issued an emergency measure applying to domestic vessels, crews and companies to strengthen the trade ban on China on 16 August 1950, however the Kuomintang government extended the practice to foreign vessels and even in international waters against the international law of the sea and admiralty law.

The New York Times reported that 67 foreign civilian ships were attacked by local pirates between September 1949 and October 1954, as half of them were British vessels, whereas actually 141 interference incidents were reported by the Royal Navy in the routine "Formosa Strait Patrol" operations since 31 October 1949, and recorded in 37 British diplomatic protestation documents, with each containing multiple protests up to seven attacks, showing the anti-British atmosphere within the ROC and the KMT high-rank circle, even on the armed intervention of the Royal Navy escorting the British vessels from ROCN warships. The Western Enterprise Incorporated (WEI), supported by the Office of Policy Coordination of the Central Intelligence Agency, assisted in the operations.

On 13 February 1951, a fleet of 3 ROCS destroyers under the direct orders of ROC President Chiang Kai-shek captured the Norwegian civilian cargo ship Hoi Houw at 24°13'N 123°18'E within Japanese waters among the Yaeyama Islands. On 17–19 February, the British civilian mercantile Nigelock (former HMS Nigella K19, Flower-class corvette), full of fruits and vegetables, and the freighter Josephine Moller were attacked by ROC Anti-Communist National Salvation Army (ACNSA, under the command of General Hu Zongnan) gunboats near the Chekiang coast in the East China Sea, but both escaped. On 15 April 1951, the Panamanian civilian cargo ship Perico was captured by the ROC Navy at 25°31'N 123°48'E, north of Taketomi Island. By 7 December 1952, Captain Robert Adam was also killed by machine gun without warning even though his British freighter Rosita had cooperated in the full stop off the Fuzhou sea lane; then Rosita was hijacked and sailed to Matsu before being released. Nonetheless, she was attacked again next year, marking her thirteenth time since 1950.

Nevertheless, the piracy activities of attack, killing and confiscation reported in the Parliament of the United Kingdom, British Hong Kong and Australian media coverages intensified in the summer of 1953 after Joseph Stalin's death and the Korean Armistice Agreement. On 26 July, the British freighter Inchkilda (former SS Fort Wilhelmus N3-S-A2) was attacked by 3 ROC-ACNSA gunboats south of the Wuqiu region, and was rescued by HMS Unicorn (I72, light aircraft carrier) after receiving the distress call; then Inchkilda was seized by the ROC Navy again on 24 October 1954, but received British and American diplomatic support to be released. On 16 August 1953, Nigelock was captured by the ROC Navy toward the Magong military port in Penghu, but was rescued by HMS St Brides Bay (K600, Bay-class frigate); it was intercepted again by ROCS Huangpu PC-105 (PC-461-class submarine chaser) and was rescued by the destroyer HMS Cockade (R34) on 24 August. The Italian civilian freighter Maribu was also attacked by gunboats on 31 July 1953, and the Danish civilian freighter Heinrich Jessen on 9 August – both were hijacked first to the Kinmen sea area to shift members, then formally confiscated in Keelung. At 18:00, 4 October, 2 ROCS destroyers captured the Polish civilian oil tanker Praca with 9,019 tons of cargo at 21°06'N 122°48'E in the West Pacific Ocean, 125 nautical miles southeast of Taiwan. 29 Polish sailors and 17 Chinese sailors from the PRC were transferred to a military detention center in Zuoying.

In early April 1954, the ROC Air Force and Navy conducted a carpet search for the Czechoslovak civilian cargo ship Julius Fucik, but failed to catch her in the Yaeyama sea area of the Pacific Ocean. At 14:20, 12 May, another Polish civilian cargo ship, the Prezydent Gottwald, carrying 7,066 tons of lathes and medicines, was shelled by a fleet of 3 ROCS destroyers, at 20°30'N, 128°07'E, east of Batanes Islands and south of Okinawa Island. It was then attacked again at 15:20 and captured at 23°45'N 128°35'E. 33 Polish sailors and 12 Chinese sailors from the PRC were first detained in Keelung, then transferred to Zuoying together. The victim sailors' families of both Polish ships appealed to the United Nations Economic and Social Council Session 18 on ROC's piracy conducts on high sea obstructing international trade and cooperation.

The tanker Praca was renamed ROCS Helan (AOG-305, 賀蘭) and the transport Prezydent Gottwald was renamed ROCS Tianzhu (AK-313, 天竺), and both were commissioned into the ROC Navy. 61 out of 62 Polish sailors were released through Polish and United States diplomatic intervention, while one was found dead in a park with signs of torture, while the 29 Chinese sailors were imprisoned in the Green Island Prison. 11 were rescued by the International Committee of the Red Cross in 1956, 3 staff leaders were executed, 1 died in prison, and 5 died due to sickness or accidents. Eventually 5 survivors were released and returned to the PRC after martial law was lifted in 1987, and 4 chose to stay in Taiwan.

== Capture ==
The Soviet tanker Tuapse, with 49 crew members, sailed from Odessa in May 1954. She was loaded with 11,702 tons of aviation fuel in Constanța on the Black Sea, destined for the Peoples Liberation Army airforce in Shanghai in defiance of a UN sanctioned collective trade embargo against China. On 23 June 1954 she passed through the international seaway of Balintang Channel in Bashi Straits, eastbound toward the west Pacific Ocean.

The Tuapse was intercepted at 19°35′00″N 120°39′00″E north of Luzon Island by a ROC taskforce led by Admiral Ma Ji-zhuang (馬紀壯上將), Commander-in-Chief of the ROC Navy, on the flagship Tan Yang DD-12 (formerly Japanese Imperial Navy Yukikaze, transferred to ROCS after WWII), with an order from President Chiang Kai-shek to sink the target if encountering resistance. When Captain Vitaly Kalinin refused to stop the tanker, three rounds of 127 mm naval DP gun shots were fired near the bow to force a full stop. An assault team led by Captain Chiu Zhong-ming, with over 100 seamen and marines, boarded and seized the ship. Captain Kalinin was informed that the boat had been seized for allegedly entering Taiwinese territorial waters, which the Captain (correctly) refuted. Admiral Ma then boarded and took command of the Tuapse. Two engineers attempting to perform the mechanical self-destruction sequence were attacked by ROC seamen who broke into the engineering room. The radio operator of the Tuapse was able to send a message to Moscow and the home port Odessa stating they had been captured.

The ship was towed to the Port of Kaohsiung for intelligence examination. Samples of the oil cargo were collected for chemical analysis in Okinawa, and the oil was pumped into military storage tanks. The crew, including the only female crew, bartender Olga Popov, were divided in 3 groups roughly by age to be transported to different locations for interrogation with no cross contact allowed between them. Captain Vitaly A. Kalinin was denied permission to visit the other groups. ROC military later claimed that such isolation measures were required for "humanitarian" purposes as the captain was allegedly ordering the crew to participate in hunger strikes.

Tuapse's final distress signal before the radio station was silenced and smashed was transmitted through Vladivostok to Moscow and Odessa. Deputy Minister of Foreign Affairs of USSR, V.A. Zorin, summoned the Ambassador of USA, Charles Bohlen in Moscow on 24 June 1954 to deliver a strong protest; the ROC Government admitted to the operation on 25 June. The Black Sea Shipping Company continued to distribute the victims' wages to their families throughout the following years.

British, Danish, Polish, Soviet and other victim states' representatives to the United Nations denounced the piracy conducts and "violation of freedom of navigation" in the General Assembly Session 9 on 30 September, but unable to pass a concrete agreement till December. Polish and Soviet appeals to the International Court and the International Law Commission (Session 9, 1957) did not succeed because ROC being a permanent member state of the UN Security Council could not fit in the traditional non-state "pirate" definition. A Soviet task force of a destroyer and a frigate arrived offshore of Keelung Naval Base in early July, and the governments of Australia and New Zealand also expressed the concerns on ROC's actions providing the USSR a pretext to strengthen its naval presence in the western Pacific Ocean. U.S. Ambassador Karl L. Rankin in Taipei officially urged the release of ship and crew on 9 July, and visited the ROC Minister of Foreign Affairs, George Yeh, in sick leave at home over night; Head of the Office of Chinese Affairs in USDOS, Walter P. McConaughy also talked with ROC Ambassador Wellington Koo on 16 July, whereas the Ambassador of the United States to the United Nations, Henry Lodge later also recalled in the letter to Secretary of State Dulles that President Dwight Eisenhower wrote several letters to Chiang to appeal for returning the tanker, but none of them could change Chiang's mind. Chiang Ching-kuo, the Director of Political Warfare Bureau, attempted to induce the statements of sailors to demand political asylum to score a propaganda victory. The First Lady, Soong Mei-ling led the representatives of Chinese Women's Anti-Communist and Anti-Russian League (中華婦女反共抗俄聯合會) to the persuasion visit. They were invited to a party in the Seven Seas Residence, rowing boats in the Bitan Lake, then the bar visits at nights, and the ladies were also offered along with videotaping for the propaganda record.

A declassified CIA briefing to the White House and United States National Security Council revealed that the shipping insurance premium crossing the South China Sea had increased from 1% to 5% since 24 June after the Tuapse Incident, and certain international liners had been deterred midway at the Singapore Port unable to continue or had to change plans. The PLA Air Force moved in the Hainan Island for the first time in history to secure another transport route through Yulin and Huangpu ports, but accidentally shot down a Douglas DC-4 (VR-HEU) airliner of the Cathay Pacific Airways with 10 deaths on 23 July. Two U.S. aircraft carriers, USS Hornet and USS Philippine Sea (CV-47) arrived for a rescue mission on 26 July and shot down 2 PLAAF Lavochkin La-11 fighters east of Dazhou Island. On 2 August, Commander of PLA in CMC, Peng Dehuai convened an executive meeting to establish the tactical command for the East China Military Region as per Mao Zedong's directive to open another front.

The First Taiwan Strait Crisis started on 3 September 1954. On 8 September, A colonel arrived to announce the order of ROC Chief of the General Staff, General Peng Meng-chi (彭孟緝上將, aka. "Kaohsiung Butcher" due to his brutality against civilians during the Feb. 28 Massacre and the White Terror era) to the crew, declaring that "The Third World War has begun – the tanker and cargo have been confiscated, and the crew are officially treated as prisoners of war", then they were beaten, tortured and received only starving rations, causing hearing, vision, teeth and finger damages. Sailor L. Anfilov lost all his teeth; N. Voronov tried to escape, but was seized and placed in a psychiatric facility and subjected to mock executions; Engineer Ivan Pavlenko slashed his own throat with a blade to commit suicide, but did not die. 20 young Ukrainian, Russian and Moldovan sailors signed an application for political asylum in the United States.

== Development ==
The Battle of Yijiangshan Islands began on 18 January 1955 with Mikoyan-Gurevich MiG-15s and Ilyushin Il-10s scrambling for the aerial domination, followed by the decisive retreat in the Battle of Dachen Archipelago till 26 February. The Kuomintang had lost the strategic control on the East China Sea, and the WEI was dissolved with the remaining intelligence operations transferred to the Naval Auxiliary Coordinations Center, (NACC) under the direct supervision of United States Navy. Secretary of State John F. Dulles arrived in Taiwan to meet President Chiang Kai-shek on 3 March as the Sino-American Mutual Defense Treaty came into force to secure the Taiwan Strait, and tried to persuade him to release the ship and the crew but Chiang still disagreed. The Soviet Government demanded the French Government mediate. Another request was also made through the Swedish Red Cross. As a result of international joint efforts and pressure in 9 months (1 October – 26 July), Chiang eventually agreed to release 29 crew members who did not sign the asylum application, including Captain Kalinin. They were transferred through Taipei, Hong Kong, then arrived in Moscow by plane on 30 July.

The next day on 31 July, PRC returned 11 American servicemen who were on a USAF B-29 bomber shot down above the Yalu River area in North Korea on 12 January 1953. One day later on 1 August, the PRC ambassador to Poland, Wang Bingnan met the United States Ambassador to Czechoslovakia, U. Alexis Johnson in Geneva, Switzerland to establish the first direct communication channel in history later known as the "Warsaw Talks" for diplomatic normalization, which Chiang strongly opposed. One week later on 8 August, the United States Embassy to Japan began to investigate the attack with casualties on the Ryukyuan fishery boat Daisan Seitoku Maru (第三正德丸) by two gunboats of about 40 soldiers wearing the ROC flags and uniforms on the disputed territorial water 25°44'N, 123°28'E of Senkaku Islands on 2 March, where the ROC-ACNSA shortly stationed after the Dachen Retreat, but the ROC Ministry of National Defense (MND) denied this, and claimed that they were framed by a PRC spy operation. The Japanese ship owner also arrived in Taipei to appeal a civil lawsuit, but was denied of compensation later.

Since 25 May 1955, the secret police of Bureau of Investigation and Statistics (BIS) under the command of Mao Renfeng had started to arrest the subordinates of General Sun Li-jen to interrogate with torture for being pro-American in an alleged coup d'état to collaborate with the CIA to take control of Taiwan to declare the independence; till October, over 300 officers were arrested and imprisoned for the high treason by the conspired revolt with the Communist spies. Sun was also put in the house arrest for 33 years until 20 March 1988, only shortly before the release of the crew of Tuapse, Praca and Prezydent Gottwald.

Chiang was upset that the British merchandise liners still passing through the "Bandit Area" (匪區) daily in October 1955, after the ROC Air Force bombing had sunk the British civilian ship Edendale in the Shantou Port on 19 January, so he ordered that the ROC Armed Forces "sink one vessel to show that we are serious." (擊沉一艘，以表明我們的認真態度). United States Senator Wayne Morse and Senator Estes Kefauver proposed to impose the United Nations Trusteeship of Taiwan to replace the Chiang's Kuomintang regime, which led to the 1959 Conlon Report by Robert A. Scalapino of the Harvard University recommending the independent Republic of Taiwan as a resolution, whereas Thomas Liao had convened the Provisional Congress of the Republic of Formosa in Japan on 1 September 1955, and elected the President of the Republic of Taiwan Provisional Government in Tokyo on 28 February 1956.

Tanker Tuapse was renamed ROCS Kuaiji (AOG-306, 會稽), commissioned in the ROC Navy with 22 commissioned officers and 88 enlisted rank seamen on 20 October 1955, to deliver aviation fuel for ROCAF monthly alongshore before the transit pipeline across the island was constructed. Taiwan Navigation Co., Ltd. tried to acquire the ship in 1960, but was turned down because the ship was registered as stolen with the IMO/IMB, so it could not enter the territorial waters of UN countries; the ship was often idle in port. She was retired on 1 October 1965, and laid down permanently in Kaohsiung Harbor.

== Aftermath ==
Chief telegraphist Michael Ivankov-Nikolov, accountant Nikolay I. Vaganov, Valentin A. Lukashkov, Viktor M. Ryabenko, Alexander P. Shirin, Mikhail I. Shishin, Viktor S. Tatarnikov, Venedikt P. Eremenko and Viktor Solovyov left with the assistance of the Church World Service to the United States in October 1955. Two of them appeared in a Voice of America (VOA) radio broadcast to criticize the Soviet system; but in April 1956, Vaganov, Lukashkov, Ryabenko, Shirin and Shishin appeared at the Soviet Embassy and returned to the USSR. Vaganov was arrested in 1963 for the Anti-Soviet agitation on the VOA broadcast, and sentenced by the Gorky Regional Court to ten years in prison for treason. He served seven years and was pardoned in 1970. In August 1992, the Presidium of the Nizhny Novgorod Regional Court recognized Vaganov as correctly convicted, but he was eventually rehabilitated by the Supreme Court of the Russian Federation. Eremenko and Tatarnikov joined the United States Army. Solovyov settled in New York.

In 1959, the Odessa Regional Court sentenced in absentia the sailors who never returned to the USSR – Tatarnikov, Ivankov-Nikolov, Eremenko and Solovyov – to death for treason. After appearing in anti-Soviet speeches in Washington, D.C., Ivankov-Nikolov lost his mind and was handed over to the Soviet Embassy, returning to the USSR in 1959; he did not face judicial proceedings, since he was declared mentally ill and placed in a psychiatric hospital in Kazan, where he spent over 20 years.

Sailors L. F. Anfilov, Vladimir I. Benkovich, Pavel V. Gvozdik and N. V. Zibrov accepted an intelligence assignment to leave for Brazil with Polish passports by the end of 1957, then appeared at the Soviet Consulate in Uruguay and returned to the USSR next year. However they were arrested after a press conference and sentenced to 15 years in prison for treason. Later the sentences were reduced to 12 years, and further released with a pardon in 1963. They were rehabilitated in 1990.

Sailors Valentin I. Kniga, Vsevolod V. Lopatyuk, Vladimir A. Sablin and Boris Pisanov, who withdrew their political asylum applications, were sentenced to 10 years in prison by the trial in absentia in a ROC court-martial as per the Martial Law system, which mandated all the civilian cases tried by the military courts. They spent seven years in prison before being placed under guarded house arrest in various military quarters in Hsinchu and Tainan mountain areas till lastly to the Yilan suburb under the custody of Taiwan Garrison Command, where a ROC Foreign Ministry official spoke on condition of anonymity that they requested the political asylum in Taiwan and were being treated as refugees without torture. Following the Sino-Soviet split, Soviet journalist Victor Louis visited the Minister of National Defense, Chiang Ching-kuo in Taipei in October 1968, and was allowed to bring the sailors some family letters which they had not received for thirteen years; then held several meetings with the Minister of ROC Government Information Office, James Wei in Vienna after the Battle of Zhenbao Island in March 1969 to achieve a mutual agreement on releasing all the remaining crew in ROC military custody in 1970; but this agreement was not realized until after martial law was lifted and legislator Tsai Chung-han wrote a motion which lead to the return of four more of the sailors.

With the new amnesty for all political prisoners issued by the first local Taiwanese president Lee Teng-hui after President Chiang Ching-kuo's death in 1988, they were finally released along with 5 Chinese detainees of the Praca and Prezydent Gottwald crews, and free to leave with the assistance of the Soviet Consul in Singapore, A. I. Tkachenko, to go home after 34 years in military captivity. The last crew member, cook Vsevolod Lopatyuk accepted a teacher job offer with the ROC nationality, but returned to Ukraine in 1993 after three years of bedridden sickness and a stroke.

Sailor Zhorka M. Dimov suffered from the continual beating and bleeding without medical care and committed suicide in 1975; Mikhail M. Kalmazan died of sickness afterwards; Anatoly V. Kovalev died in a psychiatric facility. Their corpses were not returned-family members were later shocked upon receiving postal-mailed ashes. Nevertheless, ROC military records claim the opposite, that they were well-treated and died of illnesses.

== Legacy ==
The communication barriers with the Tuapse crew exposed the issue of lacking interpreters and translators in need, so Major-general Pu Dao-ming (卜道明少將), who was processing the case, gave the detainees a radio to listen to the news, and received special permission to found the first Russian language course in Taiwanese history at the Foreign Language School of MND in 1957. The exceptional permission was extended later to the public institutes with scholarships offered for specified services, till the taboo finally disappeared with decades of accumulated outstanding practice merits, and the East European cultural and linguistic education are open to the civilian society and academies such as the academies of NCCU, CCU, TKU and FHK today. Pu died during a surgery before re-appealing to Chiang for the crew's release, on 24 May 1964.

The story of Tuapse was depicted in the film Ч. П. — Чрезвычайное происшествие (E.A. — Extraordinary Accident) in two parts in 1958, directed by Viktor Ivchenko where two actors were from the original crew, then became the top film of 1959 in the USSR, with 47.5 million viewers.

The ROC naval traffic blockade status ended on 12 September 1979; while the penalties and measures against the vessels, crews and companies involving in the trade with PRC remained until 15 January 1992.

In 1996, the Russian Government awarded a medal to each of the living Tuapse survivors.

ROCS Kuaiji (AOG-306) maintained the record as the largest vessel in the ROC Navy history with the 18,000 tons of displacement until 23 January 2015, when the modern ROCS Pan Shi (AOE-532) with the 20,630 tons of maximum flexible displacement launched in service.

The Central Naval Museum in Saint Petersburg preserves a model of the tanker Tuapse.

In 2005, a marble plaque in memory of Tuapse and her crew was erected in front of the passenger terminal building of the Odessa Port of Ukraine, where her final journey of no return began.

== See also ==
- February 28 incident
- Kashmir Princess
- China Airlines Flight 334
- 1987 Lieyu massacre
- Min Ping Yu No. 5540 incident
- Min Ping Yu No. 5202
- Zhang Xueliang
- Sun Li-jen
- Shih Ming-teh
- Lin Yi-hsiung
- Henry Liu
