= Guanbi policy =

Naval blockade policy of Taiwan (ROC)

The Guanbi policy (Chinese: 關閉政策; lit. 'closure policy'), also known as the closed port policy (Chinese: 閉港政策) was a military blockade policy of the government of the Republic of China (ROC), now commonly known as Taiwan, against the Chinese Communist Party (CCP) in the Communist-controlled Zone and later, the newly established People's Republic of China (PRC). The policy sought to restrict maritime access to ports controlled by the CCP and to disrupt trade and logistics to the PRC during the early Cold War period.

== Background ==
Following the conclusion of the Chinese Civil War, the ROC government relocated to Taiwan while continuing to claim sovereignty over all of China, Mongolia, and other territories. In response to the establishment of the People’s Republic of China in October 1949, the ROC adopted a series of measures aimed at undermining the CCP’s economic and military consolidation. Among these was the declaration of a maritime closure on Communist-controlled ports, a policy that became known as the Guanbi policy.

== Declaration and scope ==
On 18 June 1949, the ROC government announced the closure of coastal ports under Communist control, initially covering the coastline from the Liao River in the north to the Min River in the south. The closure was enforced through naval patrols and aerial surveillance, and the designated area was later extended to include ports in Guangdong Province, extending the blockade to the entire Chinese coastline.

=== Legal framing ===
The ROC government characterized the policy as a “port closure” rather than a formal blockade in order to avoid the legal implications of a declared state of war. Despite this distinction, foreign governments and legal scholars generally regarded the policy as a de facto naval blockade under international law.

== Implementation ==
In August 1950, the ROC Executive Yuan introduced regulations prohibiting ROC-registered vessels, shipping companies, and crews from engaging in trade with PRC-controlled ports. Additional enforcement measures were adopted in July 1962, further tightening restrictions on maritime traffic and authorizing naval interception of vessels suspected of violating the closure.

=== Enforcement and incidents ===
ROC naval forces conducted patrols and interceptions in the Taiwan Strait and adjacent waters. Numerous foreign merchant vessels, including British, Polish, and Soviet ships, were stopped or detained, leading to diplomatic protests. These incidents attracted international attention and raised concerns regarding freedom of navigation and maritime neutrality.

One of the most prominent cases associated with the policy was the 1954 seizure of the Soviet oil tanker Tuapse, which resulted in prolonged diplomatic disputes and allegations of unlawful detention of crew members.

== International reaction ==
Several governments, including the United Kingdom and the Soviet Union, lodged formal protests against ROC enforcement actions. Legal debates emerged over whether the ROC’s actions constituted piracy, unlawful seizure, or a legitimate exercise of belligerent rights in the absence of a declared war.

== Termination ==
Following changes in international relations, including the normalization of relations between the United States and the PRC, the ROC gradually reduced enforcement of the Guanbi policy. The naval blockade component was formally ended on 12 September 1979. Remaining regulations related to port closure and shipping restrictions were abolished on 15 January 1992.

A major milestone of the restoration of Taiwan Strait shipping was the 11-hour passage of the People's Republic of China (PRC) cargo ship Meishan (眉山轮) on 29 May 1979 across the Taiwan Strait from Kinmen to the Matsu Islands. The PRC resumed the use of its own civilian vessels across the Taiwan Strait.

=== Opening of the south-north route ===
In May 1966, premier Zhou Enlai of the State council approved the report of the Ministry of Communications on opening the north–south route from Zhanjiang, Guangdong to Qingdao, Shandong. On 25 April 1968, the Liming (黎明轮, The Dawn) first sailed south from Guangdong, entering the Sulu sea from the Balabac strait. It entered the Pacific Ocean along the northern coast of Mindanao through the Surigao and San Bernardino straits. It then turned northeast towards the Japanese coast and entered the East China Sea through the Osumi strait. On 8 May the Liming arrived Qingdao port, traveling 4533 nautical miles. Between June 2–14, it made its return to Zhanjiang via the reverse route.

From September 22 to October 4, the Jiujiang (九江, lit. Ninth River), belonging to the Guangdong Ocean shipping company took the same route. On October 22, Zhou Enlai officially approved the opening of the north–south route.

In February 1972, Nixon visited China, signaling a détente in US-China relations. In October, the Wuzhishan (五指山轮) sailed from Hainan Basuo port (八所港) to the Dalian port, greatly shortening the north–south route. In July 1974, the Yangmingshan (阳明山轮) sailed from Zhanjiang port to Qingdao, shortening the route even further.

However, because mainland ships cannot typically pass through the Taiwan strait, the South-North route for a long time had to detour around the Pacific. Only in 1979 did shipping resume across the Taiwan strait.

== Legacy ==
The Guanbi policy remains a significant example of Cold War maritime strategy in East Asia. It illustrates the ROC’s use of economic and naval measures to pursue political objectives and has been studied in the context of international law, cross-strait relations, and post-war Asian geopolitics.

== See also ==
- Cross-strait relations
- Capture of Tanker Tuapse
- 1987 Lieyu massacre
- Min Ping Yu No. 5540 incident
- Min Ping Yu No. 5202
- USS Decker
- Article 4 of the Constitution of the Republic of China
