= 1987 Lieyu massacre =

Massacre of Vietnam War refugees by the ROC Army

- Part of the Cold War in Asia and Indochina refugee crisis
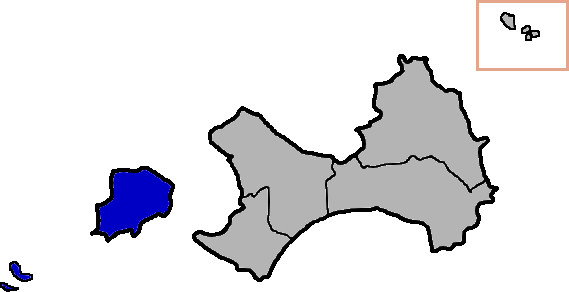
- Location: 24°24′54″N 118°14′21″E; Republic of China; Donggang, Lieyu Township, Kinmen County, Fuchien Province
- Date: 7 March 1987 – 8 March 1987; 39 years ago (UTC+8)
- Target: Vietnamese boat people
- Attack type: Massacre
- Deaths: 24 (Note: Victims list (partial): Vũ Kim Hùng, Hoàng Thị Dung, Vũ Nga and three family members, Nguyễn Văn Dậu, Trần Kim Thanh, Nguyễn Văn Ánh, Nguyễn Văn Huy, Nguyễn Phi Nga, Nguyễn Thị Toan, Nguyễn Phi Tuấn, Nguyễn Phi Ngọc, Vũ Kim Cường, Vũ Kim Dũng, Lê Hải Hiệp, Hoàng Văn Thái, Hoàng Văn Siếng, Nguyễn Thị Dung, Nguyễn Thị Bích Hằng, Vũ Đình Huân, Trần Quốc Hùng, Nguyễn Văn Hạnh....)
- Perpetrators: 158 Heavy Infantry Division, Kinmen Defense Command, Republic of China Army
- Motive: 3: Order of taking no surrender, 16 (?): Eliminating witnesses

1987 Lieyu massacre
- Traditional Chinese: 烈嶼屠殺事件
- Simplified Chinese: 烈屿屠杀事件
Transcriptions
Standard Mandarin
- Hanyu Pinyin: Lièyǔ Túshā Shìjiàn

March 7 Incident
- Chinese: 三七事件
Transcriptions
Standard Mandarin
- Hanyu Pinyin: Sānqī shìjiàn

Donggang Incident
- Traditional Chinese: 東崗事件
- Simplified Chinese: 东岗事件
Transcriptions
Standard Mandarin
- Hanyu Pinyin: Dōnggǎng shìjiàn

Donggang Tragedy
- Traditional Chinese: 東崗慘案
- Simplified Chinese: 东岗惨案
Transcriptions
Standard Mandarin
- Hanyu Pinyin: Dōnggǎng cǎn'àn

The 1987 Lieyu massacre occurred on 7 March 1987 at Donggang Bay, Lieyu Island ("Lesser Kinmen" or "Little Quemoy"), Kinmen, Fuchien, Republic of China (ROC) when soldiers from the ROC Army's 158 Heavy Infantry Division killed 24 Vietnamese refugees on the shoreline of Donggang Bay, including eight children (one baby), five women (one pregnant) and eleven men. The ROC military officially denied the massacre and defined it as an incident of "accidental manslaughter" (誤殺事件), hence referring to it as the March 7 Incident (三七事件) or Donggang Incident (東崗事件).

Despite the ROC's attempts to cover-up the incident, the massacre sparked political outrage, and partially contributed to the end of the 38-year long period of martial law; it had been in place since the Kuomintang's exodus from mainland China in May 1949. The case remains under investigation.

== Background ==
The entire Kinmen Archipelago, a group of about twenty islands and islets, were still considered a war zone at the time and were under martial law. The Kinmen Defense Command (金門防衛司令部, or KDC), a field army of the Republic of China (ROC) Army, controlled the islands in an effort to prevent an attack by the People's Liberation Army after the ROC had ended its attempt to retake mainland China by force in 1970. On 18 December 1978, Deng Xiaoping announced the reform and opening up policy, followed by the establishment of 4 special economic zones. The international port of Xiamen was expanded for commercial traffic on 7 October 1980.

The KDC Commander, General Song Hsin-lien, was promoted to director of the National Security Bureau in Taipei on 15 December, and General Chao Wan-fu assumed the command. In the following spring, Chao instructed the 158 Division Commander, Major-general Gong Li (龔力少將) to construct two propaganda walls—one 3.2m high and 20m long on Dadan Island, and the other on Erdan Island—with slogans proclaiming "Three Principles of the People Unify China" shining with neon lights at night until July 1995. Completed in August 1986, the walls faced the international seaway of Xiamen Bay, where Xi Jinping (later CCP general secretary) was the Deputy Mayor of Xiamen City.

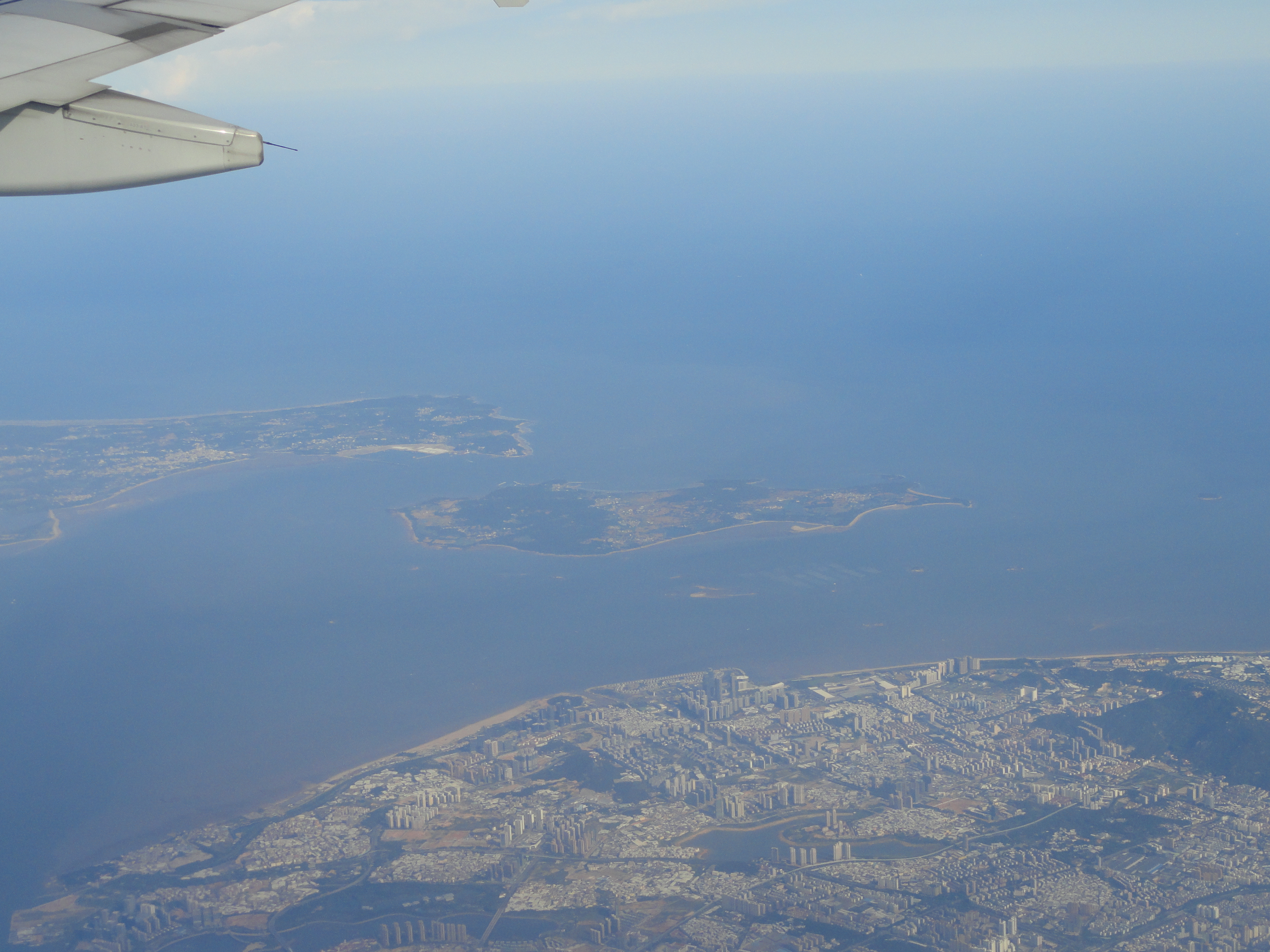
Xiamen, Lieyu (center), and Kinmen (left)

=== Refugees ===
Following the Vietnam War (1955–1975), the Cambodian–Vietnamese War (1978–1979), and the Sino-Vietnamese War (1979), many Indochinese refugees fled abroad. They often had to move several times as local authorities rejected those displaced by the crisis. The Penghu Defense Command (澎湖防衛司令部 or PDC) cooperated with the "Hai-piao Project" (海漂專案) (an arrangement of the Overseas Community Affairs Council and the Chinese Association for Relief and Ensuing Services) to transport 2,098 refugees in 45 boats and the "Ren-de Project" (仁德專案) to relocate another 6,497 refugees by air. In total, over 12,500 people were rescued starting in 1975.

On 1 April 1982, the Executive Yuan issued the "Pingjing Project" (平靖專案), a procedure instructing the Ministry of National Defense (MND) to return the refugees. The MND updated its standard operating procedure in 1985 but did not actually enforce the new guidance. Instead, the actual practice in the frontline was to kill detainees if a purge failed. They would either bury corpses perfunctorily on the beach or let the tides pull the bodies into the sea. The MND were well aware of the practice, but turned a blind eye. They forged ahead with purposeful "refugee warfare" which endangered national security.

=== Incidents ===
In January 1985, a local Chinese sampan with eight fishermen suffered engine failure and floated ashore at Shi Islet, part of the 473 Brigade's defense region. When the platoon stationed there contacted the KDC for instructions, they were ordered to kill the stranded fishermen. Six died under crossfire but two escaped to a rock cave, kneeling down to beg for mercy. When discovered, those two were pushed off the rock cliff to fall to their death after the KDC reiterated the order to kill the entire crew. A subsequent search of the sampan found only a letter drafted by one of the sailors, a son telling his mother that he had collected sufficient yarn for her to knit a sweater for winter.

In April 1986, an incident occurred where a young couple, both teachers, swam from Xiamen to Dadan Island seeking asylum. The commander of the Dadan Defense Team (大膽守備隊), Premier Deputy Division Commander of the 158 Lieyu Division (烈嶼師) Colonel Chien Yi-hu (錢奕虎上校), received the couple and escorted them to the KDC headquarters on the main island of Kinmen. Chien was immediately relieved of his post for violating the directive to "accept no surrender in the war zone".

In mid-July 1986, General Chao inspected the outlying islets of Lieyu, and noticed that the amphibious reconnaissance battalion (ARB-101, 海龍蛙兵) took in an unknown person swimming near Dadan after the local garrison failed to expel him away. Chao was furious, condemning the ARB leader, and left in anger; the Dadan commander then called all the units to announce the kill-them-all policy to prevent anybody arriving onshore. The neighboring Erdan Island commander (二膽守備隊), Deputy Brigade Commander of the 473 Brigade lieutenant colonel Zhong—who had executed 7 stranded fishermen in 1983 and relayed the KDC's order for the aforementioned killings at Shi Islet—also summoned all the soldiers to reiterate the order: "Whoever lands on the island must be executed without exception." Soon after, he was promoted to the position of 472 Nantang Brigade Commander (南塘旅) and took charge of all the units in the South Lieyu Defense Team (烈嶼南守備隊).

=== Nuclear weapons program ===
External image
- Declassified KDC nuclear cannon strike plan covers Xiamen City & international Port of Economy Zone Distance: 10 km, Effective Radius: 8 km, Population: 1.06 million

Both the KDC and the Matsu Defense Command (馬祖防衛司令部, or MDC) guarded nuclear artillery strike plans targeting neighboring regions during the Cold War. These targeted regions included the strategic Xiamen City, even though the affected radius also covered the ROC's own stationed Dadan and Erdan Islands. It is alleged that a previous nuclear weapons program undertaken since 1967 was forced to stop in 1977 under the pressure of United States and IAEA, but was followed by another hidden agenda. In 1986, after nearly 20 years of research and simulation testing, a successful minimized nuclear test at the Jioupeng military field in Pingtung was recorded by US satellite imagery; later, in 1988, it was questioned by the director of American Institute in Taiwan, David Dean, according to the diary of Superior-general Hau Pei-tsun.

The development of the nuclear weapons program was eventually exposed by Colonel Chang Hsien-yi, deputy director of the Institute of Nuclear Energy Research at the National Chung-Shan Institute of Science and Technology, who defected to the United States in January 1988. A ROC military agent traced Chang's child after school to locate their home in Washington, D.C. until finally violated the federal witness protection program, further leading to the confrontation of Director Dean with General Hau.

== Massacre ==
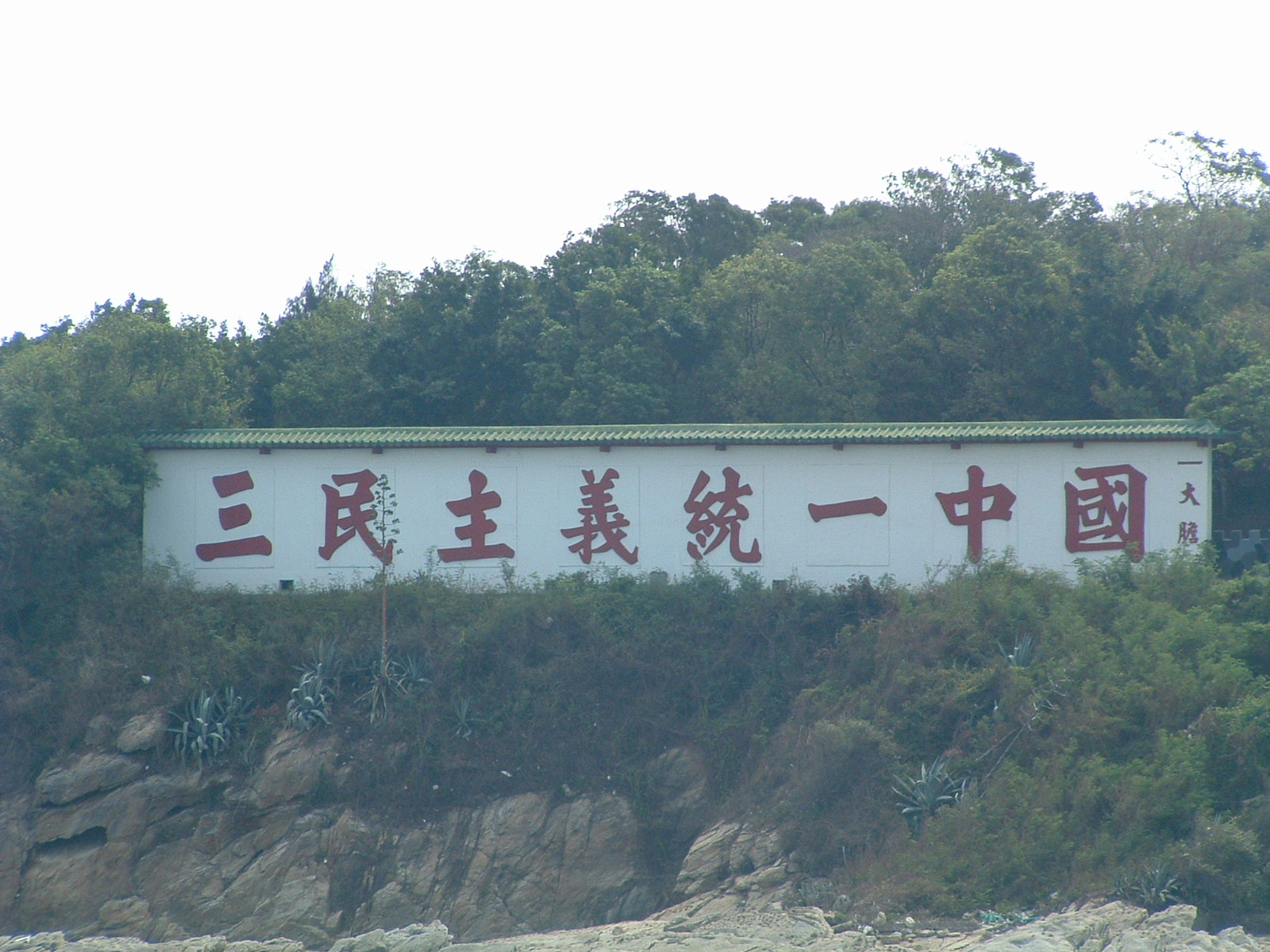
General Chao's "Three Principles of the People Unify China" wall on Dadan Island

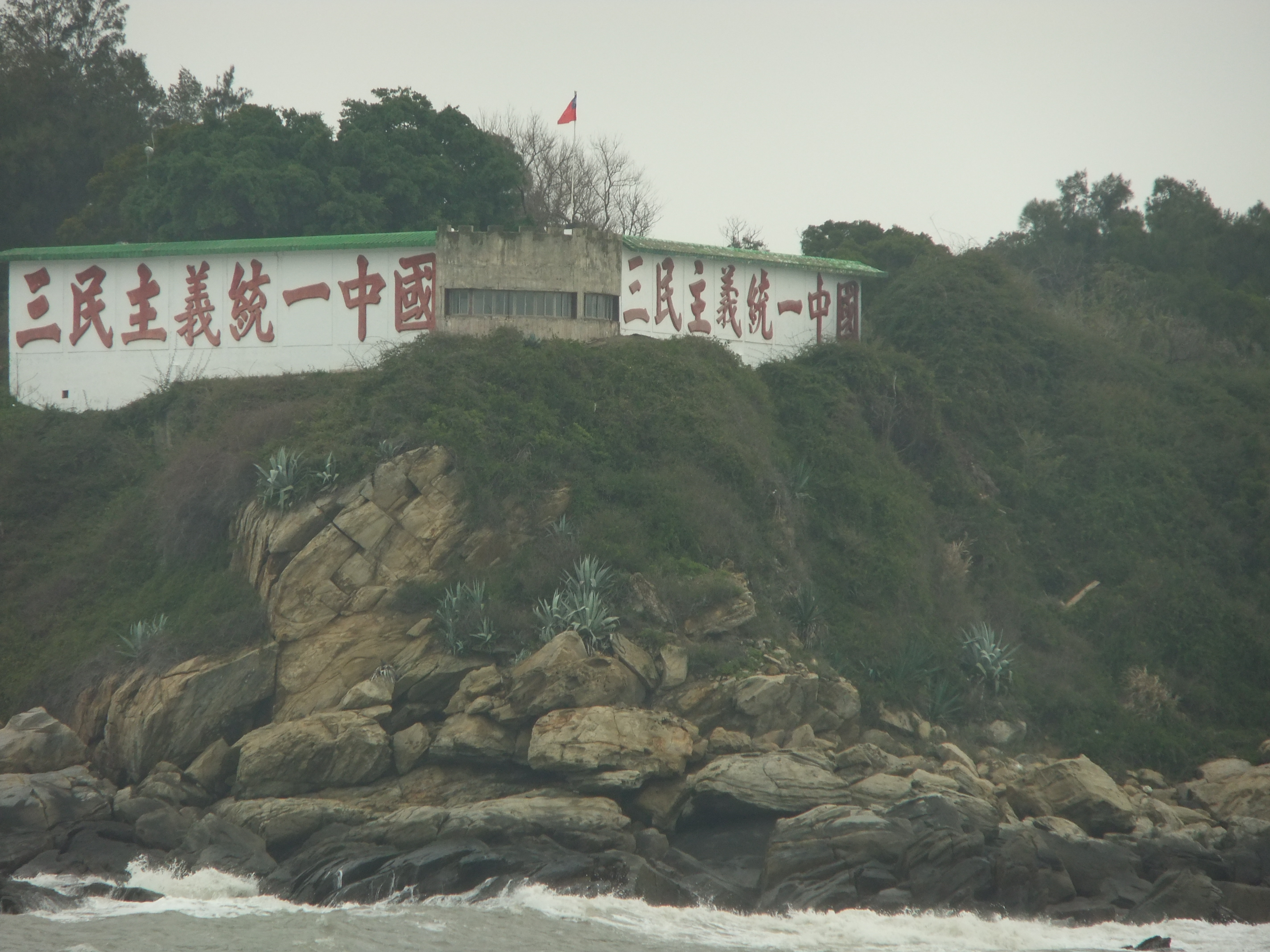
Erdan Island fortress bearing General Chao's same Chinese unification slogans

External image
- Last seen disoriented boat trail mark

External image
- Dashanding Hill & Donggang Bay

External image
- Fishery port (bottom-left), first scene (center) & second scene (mid-left) have been demolished; landform changed

External image
- Gen. Hau's Diary (May 20 – Oct. 1)

On 6 March 1987, a boat of Vietnamese refugees who had been rejected in Hong Kong arrived in Kinmen to request political asylum. However, General Chao rejected the demand, and ordered an ARB-101 patrol boat to tow away the boat from the shore on the morning of 7 March, with a warning not to return. However, for reasons unclear, information about the boat's presence in the Southern Sea was never forwarded to the front line of the coastal defense units, including those on Lieyu Island.

As a seasonal heavy fog appeared on the coast and gradually turned clear in the afternoon, the Vietnamese boat was sighted by an infantry post off the south shore of Lieyu at 16:37, where it had been too close and too late to apply for the indirect fire support by artillery intervention. The local 1st Dashanding Infantry Battalion (大山頂營) Commander, Major Liu Yu; the 472 Brigade Commander, Colonel Zhong; and the 158 Division G3 Chief Operation Officer (參三科科長), Colonel Han Jing-yue (韓敬越), arrived at the scene with staff officers. The 629 Light Artillery Battalion—which happened to be taking a field drill practice in the ancient airport on the northeastern beachfront—launched a single star shell which lit up the background horizon sky, but found no invasion force approaching. Meanwhile, warning shots followed by expelling shots were fired in sequence as per the procedure steps in the rules of engagement, using T57 rifles, .30 caliber, and .50 caliber machine guns in short range by the 3rd Company and the reserve platoons of three companies while another one was coming in, totaling over 200 infantrymen.

The Vietnamese boat was stranded on the sand beach southwest of Donggang (Dōnggāng) Fishery Port (Fort L-05), a sensitive strategic point in front of the mobile positions of M40 recoilless rifles and M30 mortars. Nearby was the communication transit station nicknamed "04" (a homonym of 'You die' in Chinese pronunciation) on a hill with a 30°-angle blind corner on radar screens caused by the steep hillside. This hillside lay in front of the classified 240 mm howitzer M1 ("Black Dragon" or "Nuclear Cannon") railway gun positions of Kinmen Defense Command, and the 155/105 mm artillery battalions of 158 Division. As such, the foreign boat's landing location on the beach beneath aroused significant concern. The boat was hit by crossfire from L-05, L-06, and Fort Fuxing Islet of the 2nd Battalion, plus two M72 LAW (light anti-tank weapon) rounds by the WPN Company in reinforcement. Armor-piercing shells penetrated through the sky-blue wooden hull without detonation. Three unarmed Vietnamese left the boat, raised their hands, and pled in Chinese, "Don't shoot ...!" but were all shot dead.

The local 3rd Dongang Company (東崗連) Commander, Lieutenant Chang, received the order from the brigade commander to dispatch a search team to board the boat. Two hand grenades were thrown into the boat before the search team found that all the passengers were Vietnamese refugees with no weapons on board. The passengers said that the vessel had experienced a mechanical failure. Because of the heavy fog, the strong seasonal currents and the rising tide since late afternoon, the boat drifted into the open bay. The surviving passengers and the bodies of the dead were taken out of the boat and placed on the beach, with neither first aid nor any life support supply rendered. Following intense telecommunication with the Division Headquarters, the commanders at the scene received orders from their superiors—alleged directly by Commander General Chao—to kill the passengers to eliminate all the eyewitnesses. Some refugees received multiple shots when the first bullet did not kill them. Among the bodies piled were elderly people, men, women, one pregnant woman, children, and a baby in a sweater.

The following identification evidence was collected at the scene, and enlisted through the P4 (Internal Security) channel of the Political Warfare Department, the KDC, and the MND Army Commands HQ:

- one "Declaration of no possession lost/damaged on boat" issued by the Director of Immigration Office of Hong Kong Alan Carter on 12 December 1986
- four copies of the "Notification on the voluntary alternative options to stay under indefinite custody or the assistance to continue navigation" by the British Hong Kong Government on 12 January 1987
- several personal ID documents from the French Indochina government
- two kerosene barrels printed in English with "Singapore" on surface
- several Singaporean magazines and Hong Kong newspapers
- a notebook written in English with the last entry on 6 March

For unknown reasons, none of this evidence was later adopted by either the prosecutor or the judge, hence all the court documents named the victims only as the "unknown people" (不明人士).

After collecting the refugee documents, a mother and three children (one baby being held in her arm and two kids running around her) were killed together kneeling down on the beach. The last words of the pregnant woman were in English: "Help me ... Help my baby ... My baby seven months ...", before she and two other women were killed by .45 caliber handgun shots; the battalion operation officer then made a joke on her dead body (never showing remorse during the annual reunions in subsequent years). A boy got up to flee but was shot in the shoulder and fell down, until another officer stepped forward to finish him off. Major-general Gong arrived at Donggang at 18:30; Zhong and Liu reunited with Gong again at the Division Headquarters to report to General Chao by the phone landline at 21:00, and received Chao's praise.

At 07:00 the morning of 8 March 1987, the medical platoon of the Battalion Headquarters (BHQ) Company was called in to bury all the bodies at the beach. The platoon members were ordered to kill any surviving refugees. The wounded were buried alive, and those who were still moving or crying were dictated to be killed by military shovels. The entire boat was instructed to be burned (aside from the 3-blade propeller), then buried in sand to destroy all the evidence. The last victim, a young boy hidden underneath a board cell, was also found and killed by order without exception. The guarding sergeant of the BHQ Company overnight counted the bodies as more than nineteen.

Over 30 individual rifles with maintenance records were suddenly reported jammed as non-operational, possibly due to the soldiers unwilling to kill the civilians, hence jammed their own rifles on purpose. Since some medics defied direct orders to kill the victims, the brigade command dispatched the Brigade Headquarter Company (RHQ) commander to take over the BHQ Company as the emergency measure to prevent mutiny and to blockade the site.

== Revelation ==
=== Cover-up ===
A local store owner heard the crying of the refugees overnight and made a phone call to inform Huang Chao-hui, the National Assembly member in Kaohsiung, but the contact was soon lost. At the time, all civilian and public long-distance phone calls were being routinely monitored by the Communication Supervision Section of Kinmen Defense Command. Nevertheless, the bodies were not buried deeply at the first site. Influenced by tidal seawater and high temperatures, the bodies soon began to decompose and were dug out by wild dogs from the landfill (小金垃圾場) on the back side of the western hill. The bodies were later reburied collectively in one mound at a second site on the higher ground next to the tree line. This task was performed by the 1st Company, who had just resumed their posts after winning the annual Army Physical and Combat Competitions in Taiwan. Accounts of ghost sightings prompted villagers to hold religious ceremonies, and a tiny shrine was built by soldiers on the beach the next year. This activity made it all the more difficult to prevent the spread of information about the incident. Nonetheless, both sites, along with 04 Station, L-05 Fort, Donggang Port, and even the breakwater bank, were all demolished with bulldozers in name of demining in August 2011. In 2021, the local villagers rebuilt a new shrine beside the path inland in lament.

In early May 1987, British Hong Kong newspapers first reported that the refugee boat went missing after leaving the port along the coast for Kinmen, Taiwan. Informed by the overseas office, higher officials questioned the Kinmen Defense Command but got no concrete response. Instead, the Command urgently swapped this front line coast defense battalion with a reserve battalion from the training base in order to strengthen the personnel control and communication restriction to prevent further leaking news. In addition, the battalion's unit designation codes were shifted for the following two years to confuse outsiders. Two "extra bonuses" of cash summing up to half a month of a captain's salary ($6,000) were also abnormally awarded to the company commanders against government regulations and ethics, on the eve of the Dragon Boat Festival. However, at the end of May, recently discharged conscript soldiers from Kinmen began to arrive in Taiwan proper and finally were able to appeal to the newly founded opposition party, the Democratic Progressive Party. The information of the massacre started to spread in Taiwan.

Ten weeks after the massacre, the President of the Republic of China (Taiwan), Chiang Ching-kuo, reacted to the cover-up by the 158 Division and the Kinmen Defense Command. General Chao Wan-fu said he was unaware of the event. While being questioned by the Chief of the General Staff (參謀總長), Superior-general Hau Pei-tsun on 20 May, General Chao still stated: "It was just a couple of 'Communist soldiers' [referring to the People's Liberation Army] being shot in the water", but Chao's statement contained contradictory evidence. Hau then ordered that the corpses be moved from the beach to a remote hidden slope in front of Fort L-03 (east cape) on the right, filled over with cement to seal the corpses at the third unmarked site, and a concrete military training wall be built on top to prevent any future investigation. General Chao ordered all the 158 Division officers to be present as participating the cover-up operation. The path access was prohibited to the public by the military after 2020 till 10 August 2024; Hsien-Jer Chu, the documentary film director who accompanied the victim's family members to the site, realized that the corpses had been "disappeared."

At the end of their conscription service terms, the soldier witnesses were ordered to sign an oath to maintain silence and guard the secret for life before returning home to Taiwan.

On 5 June 1987, Independence Evening Post was the first Taiwanese newspaper to report the massacre, which prompted formal questioning by the newly elected Legislative Yuan member Wu Shu-chen, along with a joint written form by PMs Chang Chun-hsiung and Kang Ning-hsiang from the Democratic Progressive Party to the MND during the general assembly. They received only the response: "No need to reply!" Her questions were repeatedly denied by the military spokesman Major-general Chang Hui Yuan (張慧元少將), who accused Congresswoman Wu of "sabotaging the national reputation", and claimed it was actually "a Chinese fishing boat being sunk in the sea after ignoring the warnings". That night, uniform propaganda was broadcast on the evening news on all public TV channels. The next morning, on 6 June, all local newspapers received government instructions to publicize the press release of the Central News Agency originating from the Military News Agency (軍聞社).

=== Censorship ===
The case was classified as a military secret for 20 years to prevent any further information leaks. Subsequent media reports were censored, and publication of the case was banned by the Nationalist government. In April 1989, when the police broke into the office of the magazine Freedom Era Weekly (which had publicized case interviews and editorials before) for an arrest on a separate charge of treason, editor-in-chief Cheng Nan-jung set himself on fire and died in protest for freedom of speech. Separately, military journalist Chang You-hua of Independence Evening Post was sentenced to 1 year and 7 months with a probation period of 3 years in November 1991.

For the same reason, the Hujingtou Battle Museum of Lieyu (built in 1989) conspicuously left out any information on this part of history, nor was it documented in the official archives of the Kinmen National Park that later took over management of the beach. The official cover-up story of the Chinese fishing boat being sunk by one shell in a bombardment was what was told to the public for 13 years, until being uncovered by the publication of 8-year Diary of the Chief of the General Staff (1981–1989) (八年參謀總長日記) by Superior-general Hau in 2000. The Government of the Republic of China has made no comment thereafter.

== Aftermath ==
=== Political stage ===
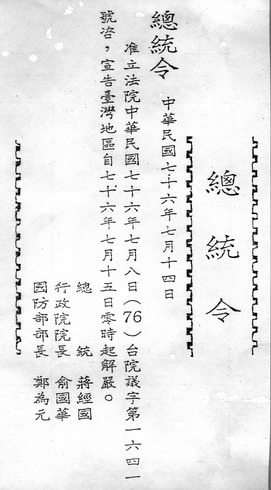
Minister Cheng endorsed President Chiang's decree to lift the martial law, four months after the Lieyu massacre.

With the support of the Formosan Association for Public Affairs, the United States House of Representatives hence passed the "Taiwan Democracy Resolution" (H.R.1777) on 17 June 1987, calling on the ROC government to end the martial law ruling, lift the ban on political parties, accelerate the realization of democracy including the protection of freedom of speech and assembly, and reform the parliament election system for the legitimacy of government; the United States Senate passed the same resolution in December. Though the resolution did not direct Taiwan to integrate into neoliberal globalization, it gradually turned the political movement for Taiwanese self-identity against the Chinese unification agenda within ROC politics. The opposition party, supported by the international community, took the chance to force Chiang Ching-kuo to lift martial law and begin the democratization process to distance itself from the Kuomintang's One China Policy. This developed with the promotion of neoliberal tendencies in Taiwan in a way that blocked political forces that favored a return to reunification.

Later, on 14 July, Minister Cheng endorsed President Chiang's historic decree to end the notorious 38-year-long period of martial law in Taiwan (1948–1987), except the War Zone Administration (戰地政務) on the frontier regions, including Kinmen and Matsu Islands, which remained under military governance until 7 November 1992. Furthermore, on 2 November, President Chiang lifted a ban preventing people from visiting their divided families in China across the Taiwan Strait by allowing transfer through a third place, such as Hong Kong, Okinawa, or Tokyo.

=== Investigation ===
After the scandal was exposed, President Chiang Ching-kuo received a letter from Amnesty International expressing humanitarian concern, and assigned the Chief of General Staff, Superior-general Hau, to investigate this case. On 16 June 1987, President of the Control Yuan (CY), Huang Tsun-chiu of the Chinese Nationalist Party (Kuomintang), assigned the committee member Ruo Wen-fu (羅文富) on an official investigation task to Lieyu. General Hau opposed this CY jurisdiction and considered the tour a pro-governmental "sightseeing visit" (參訪金門). However, after Ruo submitted a field survey report expectedly identical to the KDC's story, Huang did not approve nor rejected the content, but only signed a word "Read" (閱) on 9 March 1988, which rendered the investigation incomplete.

The Minister of National Defense, Cheng Wei-yuan, also arrived in Kinmen, and dispatched a special envoy of the Political Warfare Bureau to conduct the field investigation and excavation that discovered the civilian cadavers and eventually solved the criminal case on 23 May. On 28 May, the Military Police began to detain over 30 officers back to Taiwan for court-martial, including the commanders, corresponding political officers, and related staff officers along the 5 levels on the chain of command; 45 officers received the administrative sanction of dishonored transfer.

Nonetheless, the court-martial did not follow the 1949 Fourth Geneva Convention and the 1951 Convention Relating to the Status of Refugees to process this case. The accused have never been charged for wrongdoings to international refugees, regardless of evidence, but each was prosecuted for killing several "unknown people" of the "bandit area" (Note: "Bandit area" ("匪區") is the official ROC term for regions under PRC control, with the extended application to other terms by definition, such as PRC nationals as "bandit people" (匪民), the PRC boats as "bandit boats" (匪船), etc.) (applying only to the domestic criminal codes) on 11 September 1987. Division Commander Gong, Political Warfare Director Colonel Chang, and the P4 Section Leader Lieutenant-Colonel Hong were set free in 10 days.

=== Trials ===
The first trial on 30 May 1988 sentenced Commander Zhong to 2 years and 10 months in prison, Liu to 2 years and 8 months, and Li and Chang to 2 years and 6 months, but the prosecutor and all four defendants appealed for rehearing. The MND then repealed the sentences on 9 September as failing to check the facts and reasons favoring the defendants. The retrial on 19 December 1988 reduced the sentences for Zhong to 1 year and 10 months, Liu to 1 year and 10 months, and Li and Chang to 1 year and 8 months, all commuted with a probation period of three years; therefore, none of the convicted field commanders were required to spend even one day in prison. They stayed in rank with posts suspended to continue service without pay until the end of the term, before relocating to training officer positions. Their retirement and pension plans were not affected. Commander Zhong took a senior lead colonel position in a military academy, Army Communication, Electronics and Information School.

Likewise, the superior officers received no official punishment, and resumed their military careers after President Chiang suddenly died in January 1988. Principal staff officer Major-general Fan Jai-yu (范宰予少將) was promoted to the commander of the 210 Heavy Infantry Division of Hualien Expansion in 1989; then further to lieutenant-general, commander of the Penghu Defense Command in 1994; and then to the Principal of the Political Warfare Cadres Academy in 1996.

Division Commander Major-general Gong Li was shifted to the Chief of Staff of the War College, National Defense University; then promoted to the deputy commander of the Huadong Defense Command in 1992; and then became the Civil Level-12 Director of Banqiao District House of the Veterans Affairs Council in 2000.

Kinmen Defense Commander Chao was promoted to deputy chief commander general of the Republic of China Army in 1989, and further to Deputy Chief of the General Staff of the Republic of China Armed Forces in 1991; then appointed with honours as a strategy advisor to the President of the Republic of China in two terms; and then received the permanent title as the reviewer member of the Central Committee of the Chinese Nationalist Party until his death on 28 February 2016. His official funeral was proceeded with his coffin covered by the national flag and the military salute of the top-ranked generals. Vice-president Wu Den-yih presented a commendation decree by President Ma Ying-jeou, who praised Chao's 50-year career in national security with so-called "loyalty, diligence, bravery, perseverance, intelligence, wisdom, insight and proficiency" (忠勤勇毅，才識閎通), and that "his virtue and conducts have set a good example model for future generations to follow..." (武德景行，貽範永式... 逾五十載攄忠護民，越半世紀衛國干城，崇勛盛業，青史聿昭). Chao was buried in the National Wuzhi Mountain Military Cemetery.

=== Later developments ===
Twenty years later, in May 2007, Major Liu Yu, the 1st Battalion Commander, proclaimed in a military magazine interview that they were executing direct superior orders, and one officer who killed the refugees was never charged. Ten years later, in January 2018, Liu was invited by the Kinmen National Park administration to re-visit the old posts of the South Lieyu Defense Team. On the beach, he recalled to a China Times journalist that he "handled" over 100 corpses—including in the Donggang Incident—during his total four years of assignments within three KDC terms.

On 19 July 2020, Instructor Colonel (Ret.) Liao Nianhan (廖念漢) of the ROC Military Academy interviewed the WPN company commander Captain Li Zhong-yan (李中焱) to re-affirm the official testimony that he had, in person, found that all the passengers had died after firing two M72 LAW shells, and hence nobody got out of the boat and there were no killings by shooting. Liao's article dignified the four convicted schoolmates with "the ultimate sublime respect" (致上最崇高的敬意), in comparison to the atomic bombings of Hiroshima and Nagasaki and Mỹ Lai massacre. However, in January 2022, Captain Li changed his statement in a cross-examination through Facebook with the other veterans of 158 Division before the Lunar New Year. He then confirmed the boat stranding site and the later killings at two different locations.

The chilling effect of the massacre led to an absence of international refugees in the waters around Kinmen, and the last Jiangmei refugee camp, which had operated for 11 years in Penghu, was shut down on 15 November 1988 due to the policy change. The purge policy on the Chinese fishermen and the surrendered remained the same, as the technique instructed by the new 158 Division Commander, Major-general Song En-ling, to the G3 staff officers: "Tell the landed people to run or they will be shot; then wait after they run to kill them". However, in live practice, the survivors were taken into custody with their head covered for transferring to a temporary lodgment to be expelled later, and the political officers started to make reparations for the civilian casualties.

After negotiations for compensation failed, local Chinese fishing boats sometimes gathered around the incident islands to protest. Particularly in July and August 1990, the ROC military was criticized by the general Taiwanese public for the cheating and ignorance attitude on the Min Ping Yu No. 5540 and No. 5502 disasters. Therefore, the Red Cross Society of China and Red Cross Society of the Republic of China—representing both sides—signed the Kinmen Agreement on 12 September to establish the humanitarian repatriation procedures through Kinmen.

On 7 November 1992, the provisional martial law control was historically lifted after 42 years of the War Zone Administration in power, and KDC returned governmental and civilian services management to the local county offices. Still, it was not until 1995 that the first marine police patrols appeared in the Kinmen and Matsu regions. The Water Police Bureau, formally established on 15 June 1998, fully took over marine law enforcement, working with local police stations and the coastal justice systems; it was later reformed as the Coast Guard Administration under the Ocean Affairs Council.

Over 100 years after its establishment in 1911, the Republic of China still lacked a refugee law to regulate the political asylum process in accordance with modern international law, and its government did not render an apology or any legal compensation to the families or country of the victims. On 3 October 2018, legislator Freddy Lim, former Chairman of the Amnesty International Taiwan, inquired in a hearing of the Foreign and National Defense Committee to examine the victims' files in the military archives in order to express an apology to their families through the Vietnamese Representative Office (Vietnamese: Văn phòng Kinh tế Văn hoá Việt Nam), but Minister of National Defense General Yen Teh-fa disagreed: "The troops were following the Standard operating procedure (SOP rule) of the martial law period to execute [the orders], though it might look like having some issues nowadays; also, they have been court-martialed...". Later, MND replied: "It has been too difficult to identify the deceased due to the long time, so [the case] cannot be processed further", which served as the sole statement of the ROC government for over 30 years after martial law was lifted in 1987.

On 2 October 2021, a third round of Anonymous hacks on a Chinese government tourism promotion website included a meme stating "If Taiwan wants to truly become Numbah Wan [sic], it must first redress the 1987 Lieyu Massacre", with a public Wikimedia Commons image of Xiamen, Lieyu, and Kinmen in the background.

On 13 July 2022, Control Yuan member Kao Yong-cheng submitted a re-investigation report after one year of documentation based on the provided military archives and interviews with nearly 20 veteran witnesses. Interviewees included the convicted officers, whose testimonies (without passing lie detection) contradicted each other with retracted confessions, and contradicted new evidence and controversies at the first site, since the last CY investigation reported 34 years ago was considered incomplete. The investigation then received approval from the joint committees of the Judicial and Prison Administration Affairs, the Domestic and Ethnic Affairs, the Foreign and Overseas Chinese Affairs, and the National Defense and Intelligence Affairs. The report condemned the KDC for falsifying the facts, the court-martial prosecutor and judge for failing their duties of investigation, and the MND for ignoring the case for 35 years. It then recommended the Ministry of Justice re-open the case with a special appeal for legal re-investigation.

On 9 August 2024, four family members of the Vietnamese refugee victims came to Taiwan from Vietnam and from Norway for the first time with the assistance of Amnesty International Taiwan Executive Director, Yi-ling Chiu (邱伊翎), Control Yuan member Kao Yong-cheng, documentary film director Hsien-Jer Chu (朱賢哲), and poet Hung-hung (鴻鴻) to seek truth and reconciliation. One of them, Tran Quoc Dung, who arrived in Xiamen later, was informed that two Vietnamese refugee boats had been destroyed in Kinmen and realized that his brother and cousin were dead, presented a commemorative plaque with a list of victims' names, pictures and birth years at the press conference, and stated that he was not there to blame the government or any individual. He understood the reasons for the historical mistake and believes that the Taiwan government and people, out of humanitarianism and respect for human rights, will take concrete action to console the victims' families. "I wish to retrieve the evidence and belongings collected from the victims and re-bury their bodies properly... They sacrificed themselves to teach us the difference between democracy and autocracy, so let's protect this democracy and make it stronger... The 24 people were rejected the first time in Kinmen and the second time in Lieyu. This is the third and last time – on behalf of them, I hereby request the Taiwan government and people to let them regard Taiwan as their second and final home, please don't reject them again!" Kao demanded the MND restart an internal investigation and search for evidence, data and items which the Control Yuan could not acquire before, and reveal them to the public or return them to the victims' families. A complete administrative investigation report should be submitted within 6 months. Chiu expressed hope that the state pay attention to transitional justice to reopen the investigation, face historical mistakes and address the shortcomings of Taiwan's long overdue missing Refugee Law to pass a bill that meets international human rights standards this year. A MND representative attended the conference to express their condolences and stressed accompanying the families to the scenes of the incidents, but maintained that the soldiers were carrying out their duties, and did not respond to the re-investigation demand.

The ROC military has continued to assert that the soldiers' actions were justified. The incident then stands at the juncture of certain issues, including transitional justice, inclusive of past crimes committed by the military and its refusal to be accountable in the present, as well as Taiwan's poor treatment of refugees, which has affected individuals from a number of nationalities. As there is no temporal or jurisdictional limitations on prosecution in the international criminal law and the universal jurisdiction is recognized beyond the domestic law system and procedure, the legal exercise apply to all ranks and positions including officers, soldiers and national leaders regardless subject to the justice even after decades.

== Legacy ==
- Hushen (胡神) – This 2019 novel by the retired school principal Tian-lu Jian (姜天陸) analyzes the humanity concern of the situation at the first site, with his personal experience of service time under Lieyu tunnels. It won the 16th Kinmen Literature Award.
- The Burning Island (戰地殺人; 'Battleground Massacre') – This 2020 film produced by Hsien-Jer Chu (朱賢哲), former member of the 319 Heavy Infantry Division in the Kinmen East region where similar shooting incidents had occurred earlier, interprets the history as a mirror to reflect universal value. It won the top prize in the 42nd Selection of Excellent Screenplays.
- Lao Dzai (老翟) – The 2021 short screenplay by Colonel Chou Yi-ching (周宜慶), deputy commander of the Psychological Warfare Team of the Political Warfare Bureau forged this case as a single misconduct of the 2nd-lieutenant conscription officer from the National Taiwan University, who had volunteered to the frontline as a platoon leader, then covered by the Senior master sergeant's help, ending in the refugees receiving compensation and left in peace. Zhou received the top prize of the 55th Annual Military Literature Award from the Minister of National Defense General Chiu Kuo-cheng in person. In reality, there was only one conscription platoon officer with the university background in 1B, who led the 2nd Company reserve from Yang Tsuo to arrive the outskirt late without participating the massacre; the referred SMSgt had retired hence not in the camp; ROC conscription system distributed the personnel only by random sortition or superior selection after finishing the basic training; never giving the "volunteer" option then.
- The fog has no voice – mourning the souls lost in the March 7 Incident (霧沒有聲音——悼三七事件亡魂): Poet Hung-hung (鴻鴻) recited the eulogy in memory of the victims for the refugee families in the press conference on 9 August 2024."

== See also ==
- February 28 incident
- July 13 Penghu incident
- Capture of the Tuapse
- Kashmir Princess
- Ting Yao-tiao
- Lei Chen
- Bo Yang
- Lin Yi-hsiung
- Chen Wen-chen
- Henry Liu
- China Airlines Flight 334
- Min Ping Yu No. 5540 incident
- Min Ping Yu No. 5202
- Death of Hung Chung-chiu
- Hsiung Feng III missile mishap
