= Kinmen Agreement =

1990 co-operation agreement between the Chinese and Taiwanese Red Cross societies

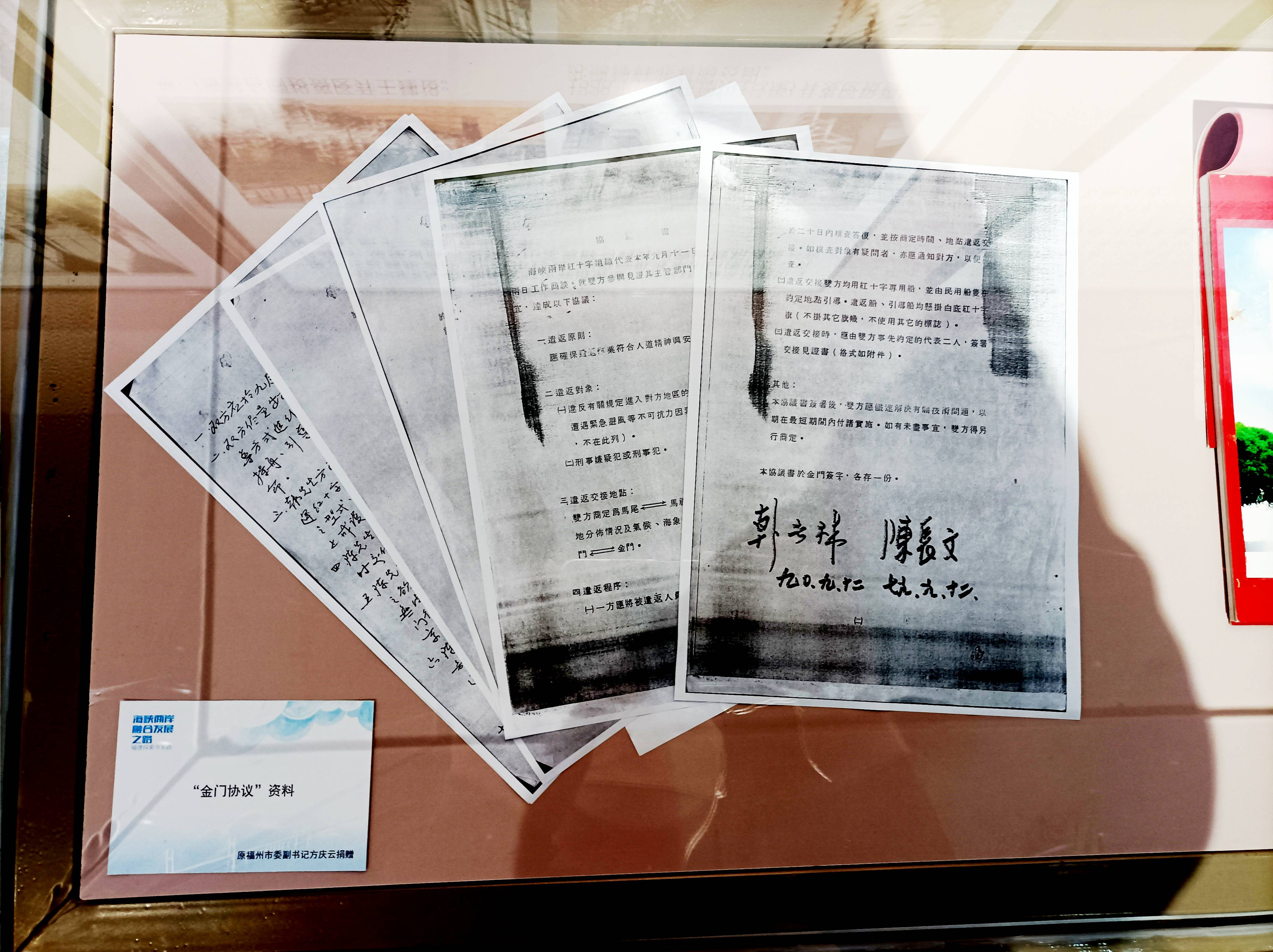
- Kinmen Agreement documents at the China Museum for Fujian-Taiwan Kinship
- Native name: 金門協議
- Date: 12 September 1990
- Location: Kinmen, Fujian, Republic of China
- Also known as: Kinmen Accord
- Type: Treaty
- Cause: Min Ping Yu No. 5540 and Min Ping Yu No. 5202 disasters killing a total of 46 mainland Chinese during repatriation
- Participants: Red Cross Society of the Republic of China, Red Cross Society of China

Kinmen Agreement
- Traditional Chinese: 金門協議
- Simplified Chinese: 金门协议
Transcriptions
Standard Mandarin
- Hanyu Pinyin: Jīnmén Xiéyì
Southern Min
- Hokkien POJ: Kim-mn̂g Hia̍p-gī
Eastern Min
- Fuzhou BUC: Gĭng-muòng Hiĕk-ngiê

The Kinmen Agreement or Kinmen Accord (simplified Chinese: 金门协议; traditional Chinese: 金門協議; pinyin: Jīnmén Xiéyì) is an agreement between Red Cross Society of the Republic of China and Red Cross Society of China in Kinmen, Fujian Province, Republic of China. It is the first formal agreement reached by civil organizations across the Taiwan Strait. The agreement was provoked by the Min Ping Yu No. 5540 and Min Ping Yu No. 5202 disasters in the previous two months, in which 25 and 21 mainland Chinese died respectively during repatriation to mainland China from Taiwan. The Kinmen Agreement has served as the basis of cross-strait repatriation operations since its signing in September 1990.

== History ==
After lifting the martial law in Taiwan in 1987, Taiwan saw a large influx of illegal immigrants from mainland China by sea, who were attracted by the economic prosperity of Taiwan at the time. Since the Taiwan government refused any contact with the mainland Chinese government at the time, Taiwan military sent the immigrants back to mainland China by seized mainland Chinese fishing boats, often packing each boat with deportees coming from several boats, a policy known as "deporting by merging boats" (Chinese: 併船遣返). Illegal immigrants were kept in sealed holds on the boats and the boats were guarded by naval vessels en route to prevent them from turning back. The inhuman repatriation method led to Min Ping Yu No. 5540 and Min Ping Yu No. 5202 disasters in July and August 1990, in which 25 people died from suffocation and 21 from drowning respectively, sparking off heavy criticisms of the Taiwan government from the public across the Strait and calls for a change in repatriation method to prevent further disasters.

After the news of the first tragedy came out in mainland China, mainland China's Red Cross society contacted its Taiwan's counterpart for help to understand the circumstances of the incident. Taiwan's Red Cross society suggested that the repatriated persons would be handed over at the imaginary median line of Taiwan Strait and a meeting could be held at a third place to work out concrete problems, to which the mainland China's counterpart agreed in principle. Soon afterwards, the second tragedy broke out, adding more urgency to solve the repatriation problem. Upon suggestion by ROC Premier Hau Pei-tsun, Taiwan's Red Cross society proposed to hold talks in Kinmen, Fujian Province, and mainland China's Red Cross society agreed. Being close to mainland China, Kinmen had been the frontline of the Chinese Civil War and was still placed under martial law by Taiwan government.

In the early morning of 11 September 1990, a five-member delegation of mainland China's Red Cross society sailed on a mainland Chinese fishing ship from Xiamen and set foot on Kinmen, which was a historical breakthrough for the still heavily guarded island. They held talks with a four-member delegation of Taiwan's Red Cross society on 11–12 September 1990. The talk concluded with an agreement on cross-strait repatriation procedures, which assigned the Red Cross societies to witness the repatriation operations via sea routes by the authorities. Although it was not explicitly mentioned in the agreement, the repatriation procedures have been implemented by respective government agencies across the Strait. The agreement was signed on 12 September 1990. The mainland Chinese delegation departed the following morning by the same fishing ship.

== Content of the agreement ==
After two days of work meeting, representatives of Red Cross societies across the Strait reached the following agreement on the matter of how they would witness the repatriation operations on sea conducted by their competent authorities:

- Principle of repatriation

The repatriation operations should be ensured to meet the principles of humanity, safety and convenience.

- Persons to be repatriated
1. Residents who enter the area of the other side in violation of relevant regulations (excluding those who have to enter temporarily due to force majeure such as emergency sheltering from the wind in fishing operations).
2. Crime suspects or criminals.
- Places of handover

The two sides agree on the route between Mawei and Matsu, or, based on the distribution of origins of the repatriated persons, the climate and the sea state, they may agree on the route between Xiamen and Kinmen.

- Repatriation procedures
1. One side should inform the other side of relevant information of the persons to be repatriated, and the other side should check and reply within 20 days, and carry out the repatriation handover at the agreed time and place. If one side has any questions on the subjects being checked, it should inform the other side for review.
2. The two sides of repatriation operation both use Red Cross special purpose vessels, guided by civil vessels at agreed place. The repatriation and guidance vessels should all hoist the red cross on white background flags. No other flags nor signs are used.
3. During the repatriation handover, two representatives whom the two sides have agreed upon in advance should sign the certificate of witness to handover.
- Other matters

After signing the agreement, the two sides should solve related technical issues as quickly as possible so as to put it into practice in the shortest time. Should there be any unsettled matters, the two sides should hold other discussions on them.

== Special characteristics ==
As both governments across the Strait claimed to be the sole legitimate government of the entire China, the wording of the agreement was tailored to avoid acknowledging the government of either side. For example, the names of Red Cross societies were not written out and the expressions "illegally crossing the border" (Chinese: 非法越境) and "territories under jurisdictions of the two sides" (Chinese: 雙方所轄地區) were rejected. It was signed by Chen Changwen (Chinese: 陳長文) and Han Changlin (Chinese: 韩长林), presidents of Red Cross societies from Taiwan and mainland China respectively, without stating their representing organizations and without official chops, and they each wrote the date under their signatures in Chinese numbers only, with the year as "79" and "90" in Chinese, leaving out "Minguo" (Chinese: 民國) and "Common Era" (Chinese: 公元) for the calendar systems officially used in Taiwan and mainland China respectively. The signatures switched sides on the two copies of the agreement.

== See also ==
- Cross-Strait relations
