= 2024 Kinmen Chinese motorboat capsizing incident =

Maritime incident in the Taiwan Strait

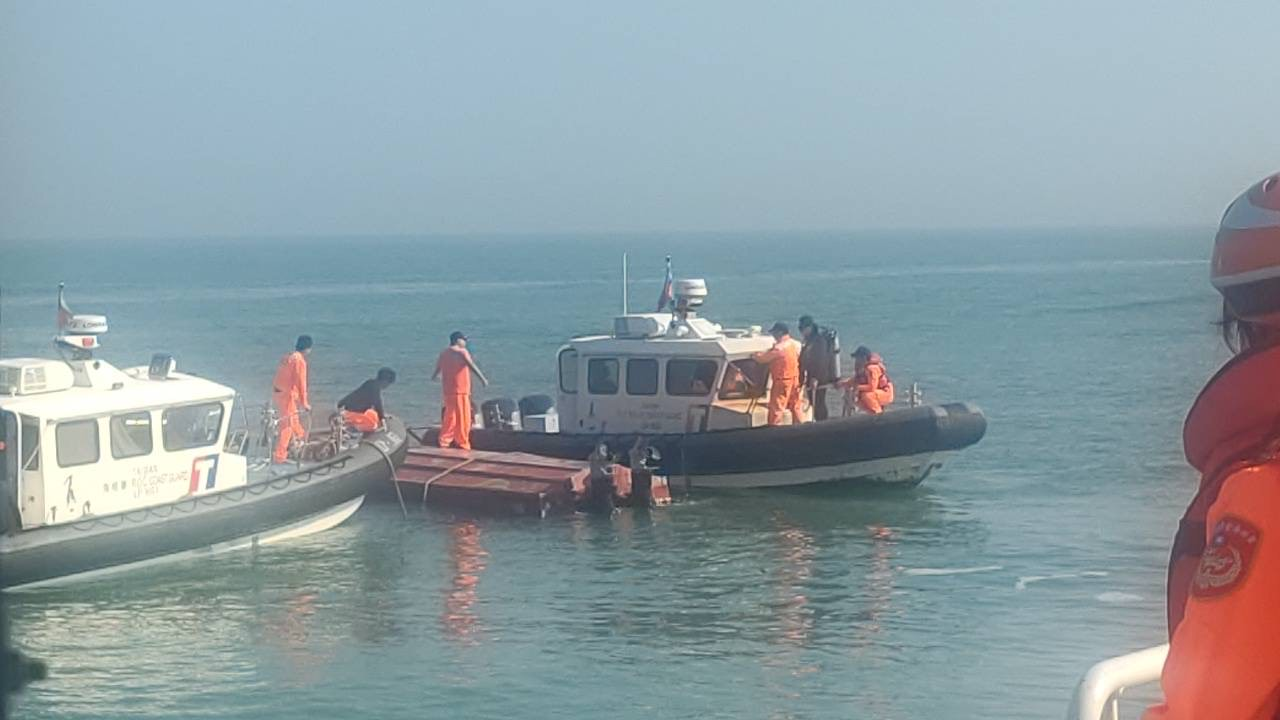
- The Chinese motorboat seen from the Coast Guard carrier
- Date: February 14, 2024
- Location: 0.5 nmi east of Beiding Island, Kinmen, Fuchien Province, ROC
- Cause: Collision between a motorboat from Quanzhou, PRC and a Taiwanese Coast Guard vessel inside the restricted waters of Kinmen (Note: The Restricted waters of Kinmen are the restricted or prohibited waters zone drawn by the Taiwanese government, which the PRC has never recognized the legitimacy of.)
- Participants: Republic of China: Ocean Affairs Council; Coast Guard Administration
- Deaths: 2

The 2024 Kinmen Chinese motorboat capsizing incident, (Note: Chinese: 2024年金門近海快艇翻覆事故) also called the 2/14 Kinmen Incident, took place on 14 February 2024, when a boat of the 9th Brigade of the Taiwanese Coast Guard Administration (CGA) collided with a Chinese motorboat in the waters of Kinmen, Fuchien Province, Taiwan (ROC). All four crew members of the Chinese motorboat were thrown into the water, two of whom later died.

== Event ==
The 9th Brigade of the Coast Guard Administration of Taiwan (CGA) collided with a Chinese motorboat on 14 February 2024. Both Taiwan's CGA and the Mainland Affairs Council stated that the boat was unmarked and unregistered. All four crew members of the Chinese motorboat were thrown into the water, two of whom later died.

The Taiwan Coast Guard Administration (CGA) first stated that the Fujian motorboat capsized due to refusing inspection and "zigzagging", without mentioning a collision.

However, the CGA later changed its statement on 20 February, stating that there were multiple "contacts" between the two vessels during the high-speed interception. Mainland Chinese crew members who returned to Fujian also confirmed that the coast guard's speedboat directly collided with the fishing boat.

== Aftermath ==
The two surviving crew members were detained in Kinmen, and subsequently deported. The incident led to increased tensions between China and Taiwan, as China disputed the CGA's justification for the chase and the concept of restricted waters. Taiwan's Mainland Affairs Council reiterated that the Act Governing Relations between the People of the Taiwan Area and the Mainland Area permitted Taiwanese authorities to take any defensive action necessary if a Chinese vessel enters any restricted or prohibited waters.

The China Coast Guard increased patrols in the area following the incident. On 19 February, China Coast Guard officials boarded a Taiwanese cruise ship near Kinmen for half an hour, which drew criticism from Taiwanese authorities.

At the end of February 2024, a conspiracy theory was discussed on Twitter that one of the survivors of the capsizing incident was not an ordinary fisherman, but a first-class sergeant in the Navy Submarine Force of the South Sea Fleet of the PLA named Chen Zujun (陳祖軍).

Discussions about the incident were delayed due to the effects of Typhoon Gaemi. An agreement was reached in late July 2024, in which the remains of the fatalities were to be repatriated and compensation given to families of the victims. On 30 July, CGA commander Chang Chung-lung (張忠龍) apologised to the victims' families "for the suffering [they have] endured" and for failing to record evidence "in this case".

The captain and helmsman of the CGA vessel were investigated by the Kinmen District Prosecutors' Office, which declined to indict the pair.

== Reactions ==
Shen Ming-shih (沈明室), a research fellow at the Institute for National Defense and Security Research, compared the Chinese denial of restricted and prohibited waters to previous statements rejecting the tacitly understood Davis line of the Taiwan Strait. Yu Tsung-chi (余宗基), the former dean of Fu Hsing Kang College of the National Defense University, observed that rejection of restricted and prohibited waters by China showed a lack of respect toward Taiwan, and also argued that previous seizures or attempts to drive away Chinese vessels could not have happened if both sides did not understand the concept of restricted and prohibited waters. Taiwanese premier Chen Chien-jen urged both Taiwan and China to approach the waters around Kinmen and Xiamen with rationality and equality in mind. United States National Security Advisor Jake Sullivan commented that the US was "against any kind of action, by any party, that undermines [...] peace and stability" across the Taiwan Strait. Matthew Miller, spokesperson for the United States Department of State, stated that the United States was closely monitoring Chinese actions, and "urge[d] restraint and no unilateral change to the status quo" in the Strait.

== See also ==
- Cross-strait fishery conflict
- 1987 Lieyu massacre
- Min Ping Yu No. 5540 incident
- Min Ping Yu No. 5202
