= Min Ping Yu No. 5540 incident =

1990 deaths of illegal immigrants in Taiwan

- Min Ping Yu No. 5540 incident (Taiwan)
- Native name: 閩平漁5540號事件
- English name: Min Ping Yu No. 5540 incident
- Date: July 21–22, 1990
- Location: Aodi, Yilan County, Taiwan Province, Republic of China
- Cause: Taiwan Garrison Command forced the illegal immigrants into sealed holds of the boat for repatriation.
- Participants: 76 Fujian residents being repatriated, Taiwan Garrison Command
- Deaths: 25

Min Ping Yu No. 5540 incident
- Traditional Chinese: 閩平漁5540號事件
- Simplified Chinese: 闽平渔5540号事件
Transcriptions
Standard Mandarin
- Hanyu Pinyin: Mǐn Píng Yú 5540-hào Shìjiàn

The Min Ping Yu No. 5540 incident (simplified Chinese: 闽平渔5540号事件; traditional Chinese: 閩平漁5540號事件) was an incident that occurred on July 21–22, 1990, when the Taiwan Garrison Command (TGC) forced 76 mainland Chinese illegal immigrants into sealed holds of a boat while repatriating them from Taiwan to Fujian, causing 25 of them to die by suffocation. Twenty-three days after the incident, another mainland Chinese fishing boat, Min Ping Yu No. 5202, was hit by a Taiwanese naval destroyer escort in its repatriation operation, killing 21 of the 50 illegal immigrants on board.

== Background ==
After the lifting of martial law in Taiwan in 1987, there was an influx of illegal immigrants from Fujian across the strait to Taiwan looking for a better life. Since the ROC government adhered to the Three Noes policy and refused to have any contact with the PRC government, the Taiwanese authorities regularly commandeered seized mainland Chinese fishing boats to repatriate the illegal immigrants and had never informed the mainland Chinese authorities about the repatriation operations. ROC Taiwan Garrison Command was in charge of the repatriation. To prevent the deportees from forcing the boats to go back to Taiwan, the TGC officers ordered that the deportees be kept in sealed holds throughout the journey and the boats were accompanied by Taiwanese military vessels.

== Incident ==
Min Ping Yu No. 5540 was an 18-tonne fishing boat of length 17.5 metres (57 ft) and width 4.37 metres (14.3 ft). It set sail with a crew of six on July 12 from Pingtan County, Fujian to the Taiwan Strait. The crew members were trading with Taiwanese fishermen when the TGC coast guard patrols arrested them and seized the boat.

On July 21, ROC Taiwan Garrison Command ordered this boat and another boat to carry a total of 123 illegal immigrants and depart from Aodi, Yilan County, Taiwan, in the morning. The other boat suffered a problem one hour after departure, so Min Ping Yu No. 5540 was ordered to tow the boat back to shore and the deportees were sent back to detention center. The repatriation restarted at 2 pm. Thirteen illegal immigrants from Pingtan County, Fujian who had come on another boat were ordered to return on Min Ping Yu No. 5540 to Fujian. 63 illegal immigrants with hands tied by plastic tape were forced by armed officers to enter four of the holds at the bow of the boat. The crew members were then ordered to seal the covers of the holds with new nails of 15.5 cm (6") length given by the officers.

In the early morning of July 22, fishermen discovered a boat stranded on a beach in Aoqian Town, Pingtan County, Fujian. They noticed that two of the boat's holds were covered by large wooden planks, with one plank pried open and the other still nailed shut. They found corpses in the holds and promptly reported the situation to the police and border guards. When the authorities arrived, they took more than half an hour to open the remaining planks, as they were firmly nailed. There were 11 corpses in one hold, 14 corpses and a very weak man named Lin Licheng of age 25 in another hold. Lin Licheng said that people started getting thirsty and suffocated in less than an hour after departing from Taiwan, so they shouted for help, hit the covers with their heads and scratched them with their fingers, yet it was futile. He tried to breathe through a tiny hole in the compartment wall, but he also fainted later.

The fourth, fifth, sixth and seventh holds were 2.8 m^{3} (99 cu ft), 3.6 m^{3} (130 cu ft), 4.9 m^{3} (170 cu ft), and 5.8 m^{3} (200 cu ft) in volume and contained 5, 15, 20 and 23 people respectively. According to survivors' accounts, since the seventh hold was close to the bridge which blocked the sight from Taiwanese military, the crew opened its covers as soon as the sky went dark. When the boat arrived on shore, the crew members opened the covers of the other holds and saw dead people in the fifth and sixth holds, so they fled in great fear.

Autopsy showed that all 25 victims had clear signs of asphyxia, and had injuries on their heads and fingers from attempts to break the covers, but they had no fatal injuries. Combining with the circumstantial evidence that they had been trapped in tiny, hot, humid and sealed holds, the autopsy thus concluded that they had all died from asphyxia.

== Reactions ==
The mainland Chinese authorities condemned the Taiwanese authorities for their "extremely inhumane" treatment of illegal immigrants, and demanded that the Taiwanese authorities punish those responsible for the incident seriously and ensure that similar incidents would not happen again.

Taiwanese government officials and media claimed that the victims were killed in fighting between factions on board the boat. The claim was refuted by the autopsy results and the fact that these people were crammed in tiny spaces where they could not stand straight and could hardly move, making it impossible for a fight to occur.

The ROC government arranged a high-profile repatriation operation for the media to witness on August 13. However, the operation ended in another incident when the fishing boat Min Ping Yu No. 5202 which carried 50 illegal immigrants was hit by an accompanying military vessel and sank, and 21 people drowned.

The Taiwanese authorities denied any responsibility for the Min Ping Yu No. 5540 incident. On August 15, ROC President Lee Teng-hui said that the public should understand and support the military for its hard work in carrying out the repatriation tasks. In a press conference, ROC Premier Hau Pei-tsun said the Min Ping Yu No. 5540 incident was an "accident", criticized the "harsh demand on the military" from the Taiwan public and praised the military for dutifully carrying out its tasks in spite of strong criticisms. The Control Yuan released its investigation report on October 10, which concluded that the military had nothing to do with the incident, claiming that it was the chief crewman who had decided to seal the holds to prevent other people from taking over the boat. The investigators had not been able to go to mainland China for the investigation and had relied on the rebuttals of the mainland media news reports by Taiwan Garrison Command and Ministry of National Defense.

To avoid any more tragedies, Red Cross Society of China and Red Cross Society of the Republic of China started discussion and reached the Kinmen Agreement on September 12, so that future repatriation operations would be carried out by the Red Cross organizations instead.

== See also ==
- 1987 Lieyu massacre
- 2019 Essex lorry deaths, involving Vietnamese migrants
- 2024 Kinmen Chinese motorboat capsizing incident
