= Guo Meimei =

Guo Meimei (郭美美) may refer to:

- Jocie Kok (born 1982), or Guo Meimei, Singaporean female singer
- Guo Meimei (Internet celebrity) (born 1991), Chinese Internet celebrity
