= Cheng Wei-yuan =

Taiwanese politician

- 鄭為元
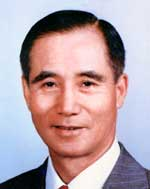

Minister of National Defense of the Republic of China
- In office 29 April 1987 – 4 December 1989
- Preceded by: Wang Dao-yuan
- Succeeded by: Hau Pei-tsun

Minister of the Veterans Affairs Council
- In office 18 June 1981 – 28 April 1987
- Preceded by: Chao Tsu-yu
- Succeeded by: Chang Kuo-ying

Personal details
- Born: 20 January 1913 Anhui
- Died: 3 August 1993 (aged 80) Taipei, Taiwan
- Party: Kuomintang

Military service
- Branch/service: Republic of China Army

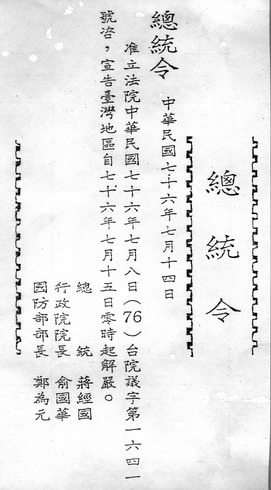
Minister Cheng endorsed Pres. Chiang’s decree to lift the Martial Law in 1987

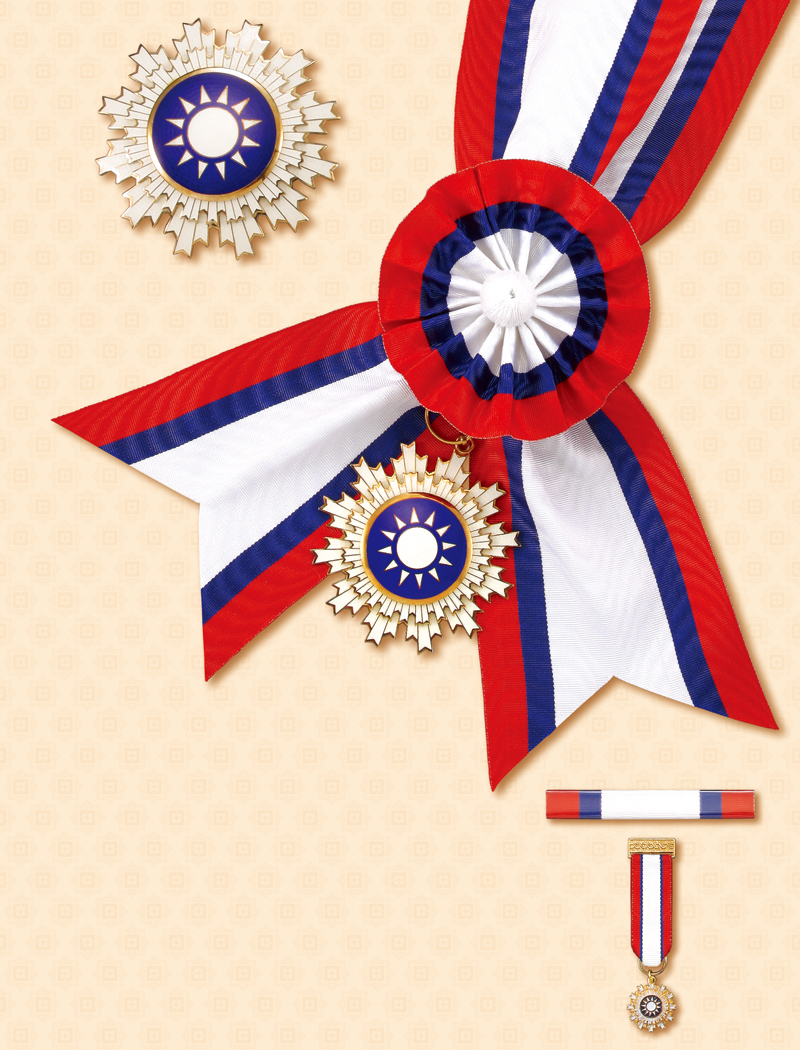
Order of Blue Sky and White Sun with Grand Cordon Ribbon

Cheng Wei-yuan (traditional Chinese: 鄭為元; simplified Chinese: 郑为元; pinyin: Zhèng Wèiyuán; 20 January 1913 – 3 August 1993) was a Taiwanese politician. He was the only Minister of National Defense (1987-1989) with the complete personal achievements in all the 4 power systems (Kuomintang, Politics, Military and Intelligence) in the ROC history. Being one of the few top-rank KMT generals sympathizing the victims by the Martial Law operation during White Terror and supporting the democratic modernization trend of the state; he kept the open-mind policy of communication to cooperate with the demands of parliament, media and societies, including the subtle relation with the newly founded Democratic Progressive Party.

== Biography ==
=== 1930s ===
- 1930: Travelled south to join the Infantry study in the ROC Military Academy after high school graduation.
- 1933: Graduated with honour being selected as a lieutenant training officer for cadet platoons, and the German translator of the Academy.
- 1936: Studied and practised in Italian Army; promoted as a training supervisor in captain rank.

=== 1940s ===
- 1940: Graduated from University of Perugia; promoted to the major rank as a battalion commander of the advanced infantry officer academy.
- 1944: Transferred as a regiment commander in lieutenant-colonel rank during WWII.
- 1945: Participated multiple counter-strike battles to recover Guangxi province.
- 1946: Transferred as a leader of G2 (Intelligence) section of Ministry of National Defense (MND) in colonel rank after the war.
- 1947: Dispatched to the United States as a military attaché.
- 1948: Dispatched to the Italy as a military attaché.
- 1949: Returned G2 as a commissioner.

=== 1950s ===
- 1950: Promoted to the major-general rank.
- 1951: Promoted as the Chief of G5 Bureau of MND.
- 1953: Transferred as 14th Division Commander of ROC Army.
- 1954: Transferred as the Chief Staff Officer of the 1st Army Group.
- 1955: Promoted as the Commander of the 2nd Army.
- 1956: Studied in United States Army Command and General Staff College.
- 1957: Returned as the Chief of the G3 (Operation) section of MND; supervised the fortress construction in Kinmen and Matsu Islands.
- 1958: Promoted to the lieutenant-general rank as the Assistant Deputy Chief of Staff of MND in charge of support operations during Second Taiwan Strait Crisis.
- 1959: Promoted as the Chief of G1 (Personnel) Bureau of MND, then the Chief of Staff of ROC Army.

=== 1960s ===
- 1961: Promoted as the Commander of ROC Marine Corps.
- 1964: Transferred as the Commander of the 1st Army Group.
- 1966: Promoted to the General rank as a Deputy Chief of General Staff of MND.
- 1967: Transferred as the Deputy Commander of ROC Army.
- 1969: Promoted as the Premier Deputy Chief of General Staff (CEO) of MND.

=== 1970s ===
- 1972: Transferred as the General Commander of ROC Joint Logistics Command.
- 1973: Founded Chinese Taipei Football Association and Taiwan Mulan Football League to promote male/female football sport.
- 1975: Transferred as the General Commander of Taiwan Garrison Command.
- 1978: Promoted as the Deputy Minister of MND.

=== 1980s ===
- 1981: Retired in term of the military career in order to perform civil services.
- 1982: Nominated the Minister of Veterans Affairs Commission (VAC), Chairman of Chinese Taipei Olympic Committee, Chairman of Chinese Amateur Athletic Federation. During his term in VAC, ROC Arm Forces reformed with significant downsizing to adapt the world situation change in 80s, Cheng devoted all resources to assist retired veterans transforming to civilian life in society, such as the paratrooper veteran association...
- 1983: After a visit to the Chinese refugee camps in northern Thailand, Cheng dispatched the veteran technician mission to northern Thailand to assist farming, vegetable and fruit agriculture to replace the traditional opium production of the Golden Triangle area, and the success earned the welcoming praise of His Majesty Rama IX in 1984.
- 1987: Shortly after taking Minister term in MND on April 28, Cheng arrived in Kinmen with a special envoy of the Political Warfare Bureau conducting the field investigation and excavation discovering the victim civilian cadavers at the first scene to solve the criminal case of Lieyu Massacre on 23 May, which lead to 30 involved officers under the Kinmen Defense Command detained to court-martial, and 45 related officers received the administrative sanction transfer. Later on 14 July, he also endorsed the historical decree of President Chiang Ching-kuo to end the notorious 38-year Martial law ruling period to pave the foundation for the democratic reform in Taiwan. MND also accordingly abolished 30 relevant special laws and regulations based on the Martial Law, and granted the commutation or release of the related current prisoners sentenced by courts-martial under the authorities.
- 1988: On 14 January, 17 hours after the death of President Chiang Ching-kuo, Minister Cheng and General Hau dispatched the public telegram on behalf of 22 commanding generals declaring the allegiance to Vice President Lee Teng-hui, and supported him following the procedure of Constitution to succeed the presidency, which delayed the internal power struggle within Kuomintang core and prevented the emerging crisis of Coup d'état by Madame Chiang Kai-shek's influences.
- On March 15, Cheng addressed a statement in Legislative Yuan that personnel of the military were free to join any political party. Nevertheless, they were not allowed to take part in any anti-government protest. Cheng accompanied President Lee Teng-hui on a visit to Singapore in 1989.
- On May 1, President Lee accepted Cheng's proposal to release the falsely accused General Sun Li-jen after 33 years of house arrest by Chiang Sr. and Jr.
- 1989: Retired from the civil service and nominated as a National Policy Advisor in ROC Office of the President (OP).
- 1990: Nominated with honour as the Senior advisor in OP.

== Legend ==
Cheng was known for his gentlemanly attitude and measured responses. Under questioning by legislator Ju Gau-jeng in 1988, he replied with a poem written by Master Su Shi.

He was awarded the Order of Blue Sky and White Sun by President Lee Teng-hui, in recognition of his contribution to military reform and democracy, and, in a show of respect to the state, requested that his family not display the medal after his death.

== See also ==
- Republic of China Armed Forces

Government offices
Preceded by Luo You-lun	Commander of Marine Corps; 1961–1964	Succeeded by Yu Hao-zhang
Preceded by Chao Tsu-yu	Minister of Veterans Affairs Commission; 1981–1987	Succeeded by Chang Kuo-ying
Preceded by Li Yu-hsi	Chairman of ROC Sports Federation; 1981–1987	Succeeded by Chang Feng-hsu
Preceded by Shen Iia-míng	Chairman of Chinese Taipei Olympic Committee; 1982–1987	Succeeded by Chang Feng-hsu
Preceded by Wang Dao-yuan	Minister of National Defense; 1987–1989	Succeeded by Hau Pei-tsun
