= Guo Meimei (internet celebrity) =

Chinese internet celebrity (born 1991)

Guo Meimei (Chinese: 郭美美; pinyin: Guō Měiměi; born 15 June 1991), born as Guo Meiling (Chinese: 郭美玲), is a Chinese internet celebrity notorious for being involved in many scandals and crimes.

== Biography ==
Guo was born in Yiyang, Hunan in 1991, living with her mother in Yiyang and Shenzhen when she was a child. She went to Beijing Film Academy in 2008.

Guo's mother, Guo Dengfeng, is a millionaire and owned two properties in Shenzhen. She had made her wealth from successful stock market investments. Guo's parents divorced when she was young and her mother raised her alone. In order to compensate for Guo's childhood as a single parent's child, Guo Dengfeng attempted to make up for the mental anguish by providing Guo with a luxurious life.

Guo frequently showed her luxurious lifestyle by posting on her Sina Weibo page where she posted photos of her collection of Hermes bags and her Maserati car. During a Chinese Business News television program, Larry Lang Live, Guo claimed that she used to be a thrifty and "honest girl at heart" who turned to a luxurious lifestyle after interacting with rich people at her time at Beijing Film Academy.

Due to her wealth, she was given the nickname Queen of the Fuerdais (second-generation rich Chinese).

== Incidents ==
=== Weibo verification ===
Guo Meimei was originally verified as an actress on Sina Weibo. Later she filed an application to change her title to the general manager of Red Cross Commerce, which Sina Weibo didn't check carefully, according to Weibo's statement. Her display of pictures showing a lavish lifestyle, driving a Mercedes, and owning a big mansion drew scepticism from people who questioned if her wealth came from the Red Cross Society of China and if the charity had misused its donations from the public.

Guo said Wang Jun, a real estate developer from Shenzhen and her then boyfriend, told her about his planned investment in a company related to the Red Cross Society of China and he could get her a manager's position there. After her status was questioned by netizens, Wang supposedly withdrew his investment from China Red Cross Bo'an Asset Management Co. Guo apologized for the incident and said she had never spent any money from the Red Cross Society of China. She also responded on her microblog saying she had no relationship with the Red Cross. She also stated that she wasn't the daughter of the organization's president or the granddaughter of Guo Moruo, a late Chinese scholar.

=== Illegal casino ===
In July 2014, Guo was arrested in Beijing for illegal betting on the World Cup. Prosecutors said Guo had rented an apartment in Beijing and subsequently organized poker sessions there in March, June and July 2013. Guo would take a cut of between three and five percent on each game played. During her trial, Guo denied running a casino but only gambled in the apartment.

On September 10, 2015, Guo was sentenced for 5 years in prison and fined 50,000 yuan for running an illegal casino. On July 13, 2019, Guo was released from prison in Hunan after serving her 5 years sentence.

=== Prostitution ===
A CCTV program aired in August 2014 claimed that Guo had engaged in prostitution, charging hundreds of thousands of yuan each time, to fund her lifestyle. Guo had confessed to prostitution.

=== Banned drug trafficking ===
On March 18, 2021, Guo was arrested in Shanghai for selling diet products containing Sibutramine, a drug which has been withdrawn from the market in China since 2010.

On October 18, 2021, Guo was sentenced for 2 years and 6 months in prison and fined 200,000 yuan for selling banned drugs.

Guo was released from prison in September 2023. On November 6, 2025, Guo's Weibo account was blocked from "repeatedly and publicly promoting unhealthy values".
