= Min Ping Yu No. 5202 =

1990 boat sinking in the East China Sea

Min Ping Yu No. 5202 shipwreck
- Native name: 闽平渔5202号船难
- English name: Min Ping Yu No. 5202 shipwreck
- Date: 13 August 1990
- Time: 10:08 pm (UTC+8)
- Location: 13 nautical miles north of Keelung, Taiwan Province
- Cause: Hit by ROCS Wen Shan PF-834
- Participants: 50 Fujian residents being repatriated, Republic of China Navy
- Deaths: 21

Min Ping Yu No. 5202
- Traditional Chinese: 閩平漁5202號
- Simplified Chinese: 闽平渔5202号
Transcriptions
Standard Mandarin
- Hanyu Pinyin: Mǐn Píng Yú 5540-hào

Min Ping Yu No. 5202 was a 50-foot (15 m) mainland Chinese fishing boat from Baiqing Township, Pingtan County, Fujian Province that sank on August 13, 1990, drowning 21 people, after being hit by Taiwan's naval vessel ROCS Wen Shan PF-834 while carrying out a repatriation operation of mainland Chinese illegal immigrants. Of the 50 mainland Chinese on board, 29 were rescued by Taiwan's Navy. It was the second tragedy in repatriation of mainland Chinese illegal immigrants in less than a month after Min Ping Yu No. 5540 incident, in which 25 Fujian residents being repatriated from Taiwan died from asphyxia.

== Background ==
Fujian fishermen numbering in thousands each year unlawfully crossed the strait into Taiwan after the lifting of martial law in Taiwan in 1987, as the economy of Taiwan was much better than that of mainland China at the time. Since the ROC government refused any contact with the PRC government, the ROC government repatriated them by seized mainland Chinese fishing boats. Taiwanese authorities ordered that deportees be locked in sealed holds to prevent them from forcing the ship to return to Taiwan. On July 21, 1990, 25 mainland Chinese illegal immigrants died from suffocation on fishing boat Min Ping Yu No. 5540 in a repatriation operation, which had caused indignation in mainland China and Taiwan.

In response to criticisms from the Taiwanese public, on August 13, a high-profile repatriation was arranged by the Taiwanese authorities. Legislators and the media were invited to witness the repatriation of mainland Chinese illegal immigrants. Before the repatriation operation, legislators including Jaw Shaw-kong, Lin Cheng-chieh and Stella Chou visited "Jinglu" detention center and talked to the mainland Chinese illegal immigrants to be repatriated in this operation. The boat departed from Nanfang'ao Port, Su'ao Town, Yilan County, Taiwan carrying 50 mainland Chinese illegal immigrants and was accompanied by Taiwan naval vessels.

== Incident ==
At 10:08 pm on August 13, at 13 nautical miles to the north of Keelung, the fishing boat collided with accompanying frigate ROCS Wen Shan PF-834 and broke into two pieces. The rear part of the boat sank. A rescue operation by the Taiwan's Navy followed and saved 29 people. They were taken back to Keelung military port at 4pm the next day and a press conference was held. According to the captain of the frigate, the boat accelerated and veered to the left in front of the frigate, so the frigate hit the boat, while survivors said that the frigate hit the boat while swerving to avoid a Taiwanese fishing boat. The survivors also accused Taiwan's Navy of delaying rescue operation which had caused more deaths, which the Navy captain denied. The survivors also said that people had been kept in sealed holds, but they had opened the covers before the incident, otherwise there would have been more victims. Later, the Taiwan military did not allow the survivors to speak out to the media while being held again in the detention center.

== Aftermath ==
The Taiwan government was under heavy criticisms for the two repatriation operations which caused a total of 46 deaths in less than a month. ROC Premier Hau Pei-tsun said that the repatriation was a matter of national security and the public should support the military. The Red Cross organizations of Taiwan and mainland China signed the Kinmen Agreement and took over the repatriation mission on September 12, 1990.

The shipwreck had caused a public outrage in Pingtan, Fujian, as it was the second incident claiming many lives of people from there. The deputy director of Taiwan Affairs Office of Pingtan County Xue Laijin said that it was not an accident, but a result of Taiwan government's constant maltreatment of mainland Chinese illegal immigrants.

An investigation by the Control Yuan found that the frigate had failed to keep distance with the fishing boat, and the Navy had not actively carried out the rescue operation after the shipwreck, and had not made full effort to salvage the boat to preserve evidence, so the Navy was responsible for the shipwreck.

== See also ==
- Min Ping Yu No. 5540 incident
- 1987 Lieyu massacre
- 2024 Kinmen Chinese motorboat capsizing incident
