= Convention on the Non-Applicability of Statutory Limitations to War Crimes and Crimes Against Humanity =

1968 United Nations treaty

- Signed: 26 November 1968
- Location: New York City, United States
- Effective: 11 November 1970
- Condition: 10 ratifications
- Parties: 56

The Convention on the Non-Applicability of Statutory Limitations to War Crimes and Crimes Against Humanity was adopted and opened for signature, ratification and accession by United Nations General Assembly resolution 2391 (XXIII) of 26 November 1968. Pursuant to the provisions of its Article VIII (90 days following the deposit of the tenth ratification), it came into force on 11 November 1970.

The Convention provides that no signatory state may apply statutory limitations to:

- War crimes as they are defined in the Charter of the Nürnberg International Military Tribunal of 8 August 1945.
- Crimes against humanity, whether committed in time of war or in time of peace, as defined in the Charter of the Nürnberg International Military Tribunal, eviction by armed attack or occupation, inhuman acts resulting from the policy of apartheid, and the crime of genocide as defined in the 1948 Convention on the Prevention and Punishment of the Crime of Genocide.

As of December 2020, with the adhesion of Ecuador, the convention has 56 state parties, which includes 55 UN member states and the State of Palestine.

== Member states ==
- Signatories
  - Poland, signed on 16/12/1968, ratified on 14/02/1969
  - Russia, signed on 06/01/1969, ratified on 22/04/1969
  - Belarus, signed on 07/01/1969, ratified on 08/05/1969
  - Bulgaria, signed on 21/01/1969, ratified on 21/05/1969
  - Mongolia, signed on 31/01/1969, ratified on 21/05/1969
  - Ukraine, signed on 14/01/1969, ratified on 19/06/1969
  - Hungary, signed on 25/03/1969, ratified on 24/06/1969
  - Romania, signed on 17/04/1969, ratified on 15/09/1969
  - (Socialist Federal Republic of Yugoslavia) Ex Yugoslavia, signed on 16/12/1968, ratified on 09/06/1970
  - Ex Czechoslovakia, signed on 21/05/1969, ratified on 13/08/1970
  - Mexico, signed on 03/07/1969, ratified on 15/03/2002
- Adherents
  - Nigeria, adhered on 01/12/1970
  - India, adhered on 12/01/1971
  - Albania, adhered on 19/05/1971
  - Guinea, adhered on 07/06/1971
  - Kenya, adhered on 01/05/1972
  - Tunisia, adhered on 15/06/1972
  - Cuba, adhered on 13/09/1972
  - Cameroon, adhered on 06/10/1972
  - Philippines, adhered on 15/05/1973
  - Rwanda, adhered on 16/04/1975
  - Gambia, adhered on 29/12/1978
  - Saint Vincent and the Grenadines, adhered on 09/11/1981
  - Vietnam, adhered on 06/05/1983
  - Afghanistan, adhered on 22/07/1983
  - Bolivia, adhered on 06/10/1983
  - North Korea, adhered on 08/11/1984
  - Laos, adhered on 28/12/1984
  - Nicaragua, adhered on 03/09/1986
  - Yemen, adhered on 09/02/1987
  - Libya, adhered on 16/05/1989
  - Estonia, adhered on 21/10/1991
  - Latvia, adhered on 14/04/1992
  - Slovenia, adhered on 06/07/1992 (Note: The former Yugoslavia had signed and ratified the Convention on 16 December 1968 and 9 June 1970, respectively.)
  - Croatia, adhered on 12/10/1992
  - Moldova, adhered on 26/01/1993
  - Czech Republic, adhered on 22/02/1993 (Note: The former Czechoslovakia had signed and ratified the Convention on 21 May 1969 and 13 August 1970, respectively, with a declaration.)
  - Slovakia, adhered on 28/05/1993
  - Armenia, adhered on 23/06/1993
  - Bosnia and Herzegovina, adhered on 01/09/1993
  - North Macedonia, adhered on 18/01/1994
  - Kuwait, adhered on 07/03/1995
  - Georgia, adhered on 31/03/1995
  - Lithuania, adhered on 01/02/1996
  - Azerbaijan, adhered on 16/08/1996
  - Ghana, adhered on 07/09/2000
  - Serbia, adhered on 12/03/2001
  - Uruguay, adhered on 21/09/2001
  - Peru, adhered on 11/08/2003
  - Argentina, adhered on 26/08/2003
  - Liberia, adhered on 16/09/2005
  - Montenegro, adhered on 23/10/2006
  - Panama, adhered on 21/06/2007
  - Paraguay, adhered on 23/09/2008
  - Costa Rica, adhered on 27/04/2009
  - Honduras, adhered on 16/08/2010
  - State of Palestine, adhered on 02/01/2015
  - Ecuador, adhered on 01/12/2020
