= Red Cross Society of the Republic of China =

Taiwanese humanitarian organization

Red Cross Society of the Republic of China (Taiwan) 中華民國紅十字會
- Founded: March 10, 1904
- Founder: Shen Dunhe
- Type: Aid agency
- Purpose: Assisting refugees in times of conflict and victims of disaster
- Location: Taipei, Taiwan
- Origins: Shanghai
- Region served: Taiwan, Pescadores, Kinmen, and Matsu
- Product: Humanitarian aid
- Key people: President
- Revenue: 1,509,510,000 New Taiwan dollars (at December 2008)
- Endowment: Public and private donations.
- Website: www.redcross.org.tw

Red Cross Society of the Republic of China
- Traditional Chinese: 中華民國紅十字會
- Simplified Chinese: 中华民国红十字会
Transcriptions
Standard Mandarin
- Hanyu Pinyin: Zhōnghuá Mínguó Hóngshízìhuì
- Wade–Giles: Chung-hua Min-kuo Hung-shih-tzu-hui
- Tongyong Pinyin: Jhōnghuá Mínguó Hóngshíhzìhhuèi
- IPA: [ʈʂʊ́ŋxwǎ mǐnkwǒ xʊ̌ŋʂɻ̩̌tsɹ̩̂xwêɪ]
Southern Min
- Hokkien POJ: Tiong-hôa-bîn-kok Âng-si̍p-jī-hōe

The Red Cross Society of the Republic of China (Taiwan) (Chinese: 中華民國紅十字會), also known as Taiwanese Red Cross, is the Red Cross Society of the Republic of China (Taiwan). The society is not recognized by the International Committee of the Red Cross (ICRC) because it does not meet all the conditions set out in the Statues of the Red Cross and Red Crescent Movement, and it is not a member of the International Federation of Red Cross and Red Crescent Societies. From its founding in 1904, to 1949, when the Kuomintang retreated to Taiwan, the society shared its history with the Red Cross Society of China. Both societies associate their origins with the founder, Shen Dunhe, a tea merchant.

== History ==
=== Origin ===
On 3 March 1904, during the Russo-Japanese War, Shen Dunhe created the "Manchuria Red Cross Benevolent Society" and on 10 March 1904, the society was renamed the "Shanghai International Red Cross Committee". Its founders were Chinese business and political leaders and expatriates from the West. Shen chose the aegis of the Red Cross because its neutrality allowed aid to reach those Chinese civilians caught between Japanese and Russian forces in Manchuria.

=== Expansion ===
After the Russo-Japanese War, the society expanded and its mission to aid those affected by war and disaster continued. The society opened Red Cross hospitals in Shanghai and other cities. Local Red Cross chapters were popular because the association represented international connections, modernity and its activities were seen as patriotic. For example, the society sent workers to San Francisco after the 1906 earthquake and workers, medicines and funds were sent to Japan after the 1923 Great Kantō earthquake. In 1920, there were over 300 Red Cross chapters in China.

=== Recognition ===
In 1912, the ICRC recognised the national society of the then Republic of China. In 1919, the society joined the International Federation as one of its first members. In the 1920s, 30s and 40s, the society held ties with American and British Red Cross, the Kuomintang government and the Shanghai business community. In 1933, during the Second Sino-Japanese War, the Act of Administrative Rules and Procedures of the Red Cross Society of the Republic of China (中華民國紅十字會管理條例施行細則) was passed. The society was renamed the Red Cross Society of the Republic of China. The society's activities during the war time period (1937 - 1945) were limited to Kuomintang held areas in southwest China and to some areas under Japanese control. Supplies were received through Burma and India from the United States and the United Kingdom. Expatriate Chinese also raised funds.

=== Relocation to Taiwan ===
After 1950, when the major hostilities of the Chinese Civil War had ended, the society moved its headquarters to Taiwan. In 1955, the government of the Republic of China declared the Red Cross Society of the Republic of China the sole national humanitarian organization of the country and wrote this in legislation. The act clarified the role of the society in the case of invasion by the forces of the Chinese Communist Party and in caring for wounded Taiwanese soldiers and prisoners of war. Fiscal exemptions for society volunteers were approved. The organization was tasked with provision of basic sanitation and hygiene to the most impoverished; and, with teaching first aid to adults and children.

=== International recognition ===
The society meets most of the conditions laid out in Article 4 of the Statutes of the International Red Cross and Red Crescent Movement of 1995, and notably the ROC/Taiwan is a signatory to the Geneva Conventions. Its mission may be made more difficult because of a lack of clarity surrounding the society's independence from the Red Cross Society of China.

=== Kinmen Agreement ===
On 11–12 September 1990, the society held talks with its mainland counterpart in Kinmen, resulting in the Kinmen Agreement signed on 12 September. The talks were about issues such as repatriation of criminals, smugglers or fugitives in the spirit of humanity and practicality.

== Chronology of selected activities ==
- 19 April 1974, the chairman of the society founded the "Blood Donation Association of the Republic of China" (BDA).
- 2 November 1987, the society began processing applications for residents of Taiwan to visit relatives in mainland China.
- November 2008, the society presented 2,120 double bed sized comforters, each weighing 3 kg, to its Sichuan counterpart to assist victims after the 8.0 magnitude earthquake of 12 May 2008.
- April 2011, concerns were raised that funds raised for the society to provide aid to Japan earthquake and tsunami victims were not being utilised in a timely fashion.
- December 2013, following typhoon Haiyan, the society sent aid, including 44 prefabricated houses, standpipes, rice, instant noodles and funds to Palau.

== See also ==
- International Red Cross and Red Crescent Movement
  - List of Red Cross and Red Crescent Societies
- Red Swastika Society
