= Red Cross Society of China =

National Red Cross society in China

Red Cross Society of China 中国红十字会
- Founded: 1950; 76 years ago
- Founder: Sheng Xuanhuai; Shen Dunhe
- Type: People's organization. aid agency
- Purpose: Helping the refugees in times of conflict and providing assistance to disaster victims
- Location: Beijing
- Origins: Shanghai
- Region served: People's Republic of China
- Product: Humanitarian Aid
- Members: 100 corporate members, 7,500,000 individual members and 310,000 volunteers
- Key people: Han Zheng (honorary President), He Wei (President), Wang Ke (Chinese: 王可) (Executive Vice President)
- Revenue: US$220 million (donations)
- Endowment: Public and private donations
- Employees: 70,000
- Website: www.redcross.org.cn

Red Cross Society of China
- Simplified Chinese: 中国红十字会
- Traditional Chinese: 中國紅十字會
Transcriptions
Standard Mandarin
- Hanyu Pinyin: Zhōngguó Hóngshízìhuì
- Wade–Giles: Chung-kuo Hung-shih-tzu-hui

The Red Cross Society of China (Chinese: 中国红十字会) is the national Red Cross Society in the People's Republic of China.

== Origins and history before 1949 ==
The Red Cross Society of China was founded as the Shanghai International Red Cross Committee on March 10, 1904, during the Russo-Japanese War. The founders were a group of Chinese business and political leaders, led by Shanghai tea merchant Shen Dunhe. Shen chose to use the Red Cross aegis for his group because the neutrality provided by the Red Cross symbol allowed Chinese relief teams into the Manchurian war zones to aid Chinese civilians caught in the conflict between Japan and Russia. Shen created a Red Cross organization made up of wealthy Chinese and prominent Westerners living in China. The Red Cross Society, supported by government officials, Chinese elites and Western medical workers provided aid to more than a quarter of a million people in China's northeast.

After the end of the Russo-Japanese War, the Chinese Red Cross expanded exponentially, now providing peacetime relief as well. There was no shortage of natural disasters in China for the new group to work on. Floods, famine and fire were endemic in the first half of China's 20th century, along with the outbreak of civil war. The Society opened Red Cross hospitals in Shanghai and in other cities, while local Red Cross chapters blossomed throughout the country, staffed and funded by Chinese eager to participate in patriotic activities, particularly as part of an organization with international connections and an aura of "modernity". By the 1920s, there were over 300 Red Cross chapters in China.

The International Committee of the Red Cross recognized the Red Cross Society of China in 1912 after the establishment of the Republic of China. The Red Cross Society of China formally joined the International Federation in 1919 and was one of the first members. During the 1920s, the Red Cross Society of China contributed to help other countries hit by natural disasters. In 1906, during the San Francisco earthquake and fire that killed 3,000 and destroyed the city, the Chinese Red Cross sent 20,000 silver taels to its San Francisco counterpart to help with relief efforts. In 1923, after the great Tokyo earthquake, the Chinese Red Cross sent a relief team, crates of medicines, and almost $20,000 (in 1923 Chinese dollars) to Japan. The Society's leadership from the 1920s-1940s was closely tied with the American and British Red Cross societies, the Kuomintang government and the Shanghai business community. In 1937, while the Second Sino-Japanese War was raging on, the Act of Administrative Rules and Procedures of the Republic of China Red Cross Society (中華民國紅十字會管理條例施行細則) was passed, and the society was renamed Red Cross Society of the Republic of China, a society that still exists today, but located in Taiwan.

The Red Cross Society of the Republic of China (the name of the organization at the time) was naturally very active during the Second Sino-Japanese War, though its operations were mostly limited to the Kuomintang strongholds in southwest China and some areas under Japanese occupation. Invaluable medical supplies from the United States and the United Kingdom were transferred to the Red Cross Society of the Republic of China by their American and British counterparts, through Burma and India. Overseas Chinese from Southeast Asia and around the world also raised funds for the Red Cross Society of the Republic of China, and appeals by Chinese diplomats and advocates around the world convinced the American public to make significant donations to support the Chinese people.

== After the proclamation of the People's Republic of China in 1949 ==
Following the outcome of the Chinese Civil War, the Red Cross Society, together with other government agencies of the Republic of China, moved to Taiwan. In 1955, the government of the Republic of China declared the Red Cross Society of the Republic of China the sole national humanitarian organization in the country, and a law was enacted that same year. The Chinese Communist Party re-organized the Red Cross organization in Beijing and was admitted to the International Federation in 1950 under the name of Red Cross Society of China. Following the liberalization of the communist regime after the death of Mao Zedong, a new Red Cross Law was enacted in 1993, allowing the Chinese people to connect with and help each other once again on a private, grassroots basis. The law describes the legal relationship of the Red Cross Society and the PRC government.

The Hong Kong Red Cross and the Macau Red Cross became autonomous members of the Red Cross Society of China after their handover to the People's Republic of China in 1997 and 1999 respectively.

Since the early 1990s, the Red Cross Society of China has negotiated with the Red Cross Society of the Republic of China to facilitate exchanges of individuals, mostly illegal immigrants or fugitives, between both sides of the Taiwan Strait.

In 2008, the RCSC received 1.537 billion yuan (about 220 million US dollars) in donations from both domestic and overseas sources, nine times the figure of 2007. Ninety percent of the donation was received for disaster-relief work in Sichuan and other quake-hit areas in China, while the Red Cross Angel Program, which provides medical aid to poor areas, received 104 million yuan, and the Bo'Ai Aid Program for poor students received 36.95 million. The Angel Program helped to train 400 rural doctors, and provided aid to about 7,800 people with leukemia, congenital heart disease, cleft lip and palate, deafness, paraplegy and cancer. The Bo'ai Aid Program trained 100 rural teachers, helped 107 needy students to complete their middle school study, and built 556 Red Cross libraries for rural middle and primary schools. That more than 6.9 million people had benefited from the total of 2,194 clinics, 194 schools and 1,112 libraries the foundation had built throughout the country by the end of 2008.

The organization came under public scrutiny in 2011 when Guo Meimei, a 20-year-old who claimed to be the general manager of a company called Red Cross Commerce and had boasted online about her luxurious lifestyle, cars and home. This led to public speculation that funds meant for earthquake ravaged areas were instead diverted to internal officials.

== See also ==
- Red Cross Society of the Republic of China
- Red Swastika Society
