= Chase Nielsen =

United States Air Force officer and participant in the Doolittle Raid

Chase J. Nielsen
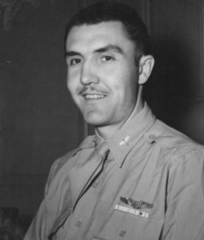
- Born: January 14, 1917; Hyrum, Utah, U.S.
- Died: March 23, 2007 (aged 90); Brigham City, Utah, U.S.
- Burial place: Hyrum City Cemetery; Hyrum, Utah, U.S.
- Military career
- Allegiance: United States of America
- Branch: United States Army Air Forces; United States Air Force
- Service years: 1939–1961
- Rank: Lieutenant colonel
- Unit: 17th Bomb Group
- Conflicts: World War II; Doolittle Raid
- Awards: Distinguished Flying Cross; Purple Heart (2); Air Medal

Chase Jay Nielsen (January 14, 1917 – March 23, 2007) was a career officer in the U.S. Air Force. He participated in the Doolittle Raid in 1942 and was one of the four surviving prisoners of war from that raid.

== Early life ==
Born in Hyrum, Utah to Floyd Nielsen and Carrie Miller Nielsen, who were of Danish, Swedish, Prussian, and Welsh descent. He was one of six children born to the family and was a member of the Church of Jesus Christ of Latter-day Saints. In 1935, he graduated from South Cache High School in Hyrum, Utah and then attended Utah State University, where he graduated in 1939 with a Bachelor of Science degree in civil engineering.

== Military career ==
In August 1939, he enlisted in the U.S. Army Air Corps as a flying cadet at Fort Douglas in Utah. He graduated from Navigator School in June 1941 and on the same month, Nielsen was assigned to the 17th Bomb Group at McChord Field in Washington, which was equipped with the North American B-25 Mitchell bomber.

=== World War II ===
After the Japanese attack on Pearl Harbor on December 7, 1941, the 17th BG immediately began anti-submarine patrols off the coast of Oregon and Washington.

==== Doolittle Raid ====
Nielsen (left) stands with his fellow crewmen before the Doolittle Raid.

In February 1942, Nielsen volunteered for a "secret mission", even though he did not know what duties were involved or any other details. This mission ended up being the critical Doolittle Raid, which was led by Lieutenant Colonel Jimmy Doolittle. The raid was daring not only because of the intended targets, the Japanese homeland, but because the pilots trained to take-off in a B-25 bomber from the deck of an aircraft carrier, something neither the designers of the B-25, nor the aircraft carrier, ever envisioned.

Nielsen was the navigator for sixth bomber, plane# 40-2298 nicknamed "The Green Hornet", to depart the deck of the USS Hornet during the mission. On April 18, 1942, Nielsen and his B-25's four crewmembers, took off from the Hornet and reached Tokyo, Japan. They bombed their target; a steel mill in the northern part of the city. They then headed for their recovery airfield in China. Running low on fuel due to the early launch of the raid, the B-25s failed to reach any of the designated safety zones in China. The pilot of Meder's bomber, First Lieutenant Dean E. Hallmark, was forced to ditch at sea off the coast of Wenzhou, China. Second Lieutenant William J. Dieter (bombardier) and Sergeant Donald E. Fitzmaurice (gunner) drowned when the aircraft ditched into the sea, while Nielsen, Hallmark and co-pilot Robert J. Meder managed to swim ashore. The next day, they buried the bodies of Fitzmaurice and Dieter.

On April 27, as they tried to reach safety with the help of friendly local Chinese, all three men were captured by Japanese troops and interred as POWs in Shanghai, along with crew of the sixteenth bomber. Nielsen and other American prisoners were held in solitary confinement, where they were threatened and tortured by the Japanese, but resisted weeks of interrogation. The Japanese government sentenced all the eight prisoners to death and after a mock trial on October 14, 1942, Hallmark, Second Lieutenant William G. Farrow (pilot of bomber#16) and Sergeant Harold A. Spatz (gunner of bomber#16) were selected for execution, while the Japanese commuted others to life in prison. The three men were executed on October 15, 1942, at Shanghai's Public Cemetery No. 1.

Nielsen and other prisoners of the raid were placed in solitary confinement and on the anniversary of the Doolittle Raid in 1943, the prisoners were transferred to a military prison at Nanking, where Meder died in December 1943, due to malnutrition and beri-beri. Meder's death resulted in the improvement of conditions for Nielsen and the remaining prisoners of the raid. On August 20, 1945, Nielsen and other prisoners were rescued at the end of the war by an Office of Strategic Services para-rescue team and brought back to the U.S. He returned to Shanghai in January 1946 to testify in the trials against his former captors, who had tortured him with waterboarding, then called the "water cure." Extracts from his testimony were later presented at the Tokyo Trial.

=== Post war ===
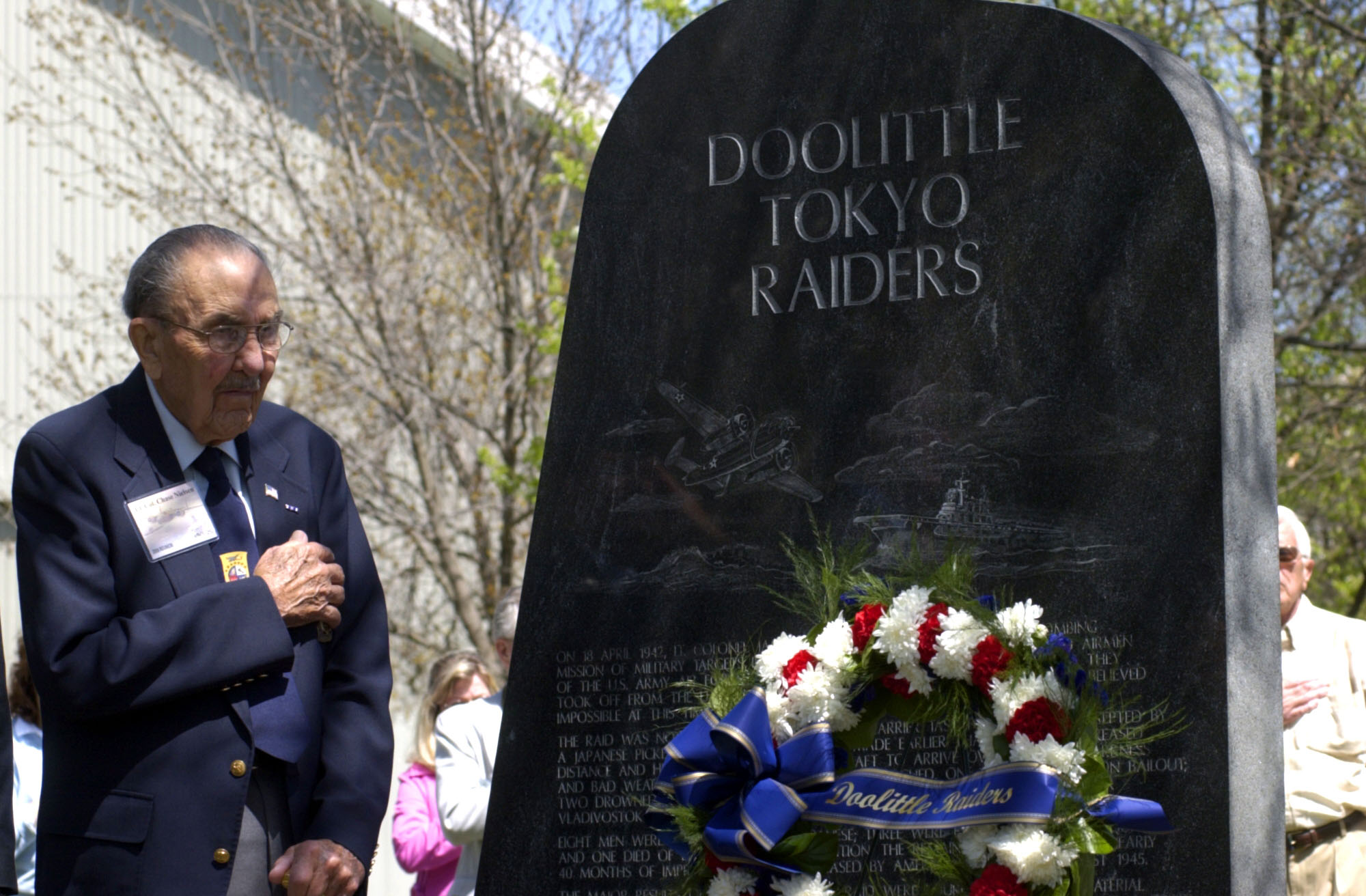
Nielsen at the Doolittle Tokyo Raiders memorial at the National Museum of the United States Air Force (2006)

Nielsen became a member of Strategic Air Command (SAC) in March 1949 at Roswell AFB in New Mexico, where he was assigned to the 509th Bombardment Group, the first group to be organized, equipped and trained for nuclear warfare. Enola Gay, the B-29 that dropped the Little Boy atomic bomb on Hiroshima in the first ever use of a nuclear weapon, was assigned to the 509th.

During his decade with SAC, Colonel Nielsen helped the command develop key operational innovations, including radar navigation bombardment, air refueling employing the flying boom, and electronic countermeasures. He helped integrate "fail safe" and other emergency war order procedures into SAC's unique set of flight profiles.

Colonel Nielsen returned to the air while assigned to SAC and reached more than 10,000 flying hours in B-29s, B-50s, B-36s and B-52s. His longest flight lasted 26 hours non-stop without refueling from Okinawa, Japan, to Walker Air Force Base, in a B-36. Lieutenant Colonel Nielsen retired from the Air Force in 1961. He accumulated over 10,000 flying hours during his Air Force career.

== Later life ==
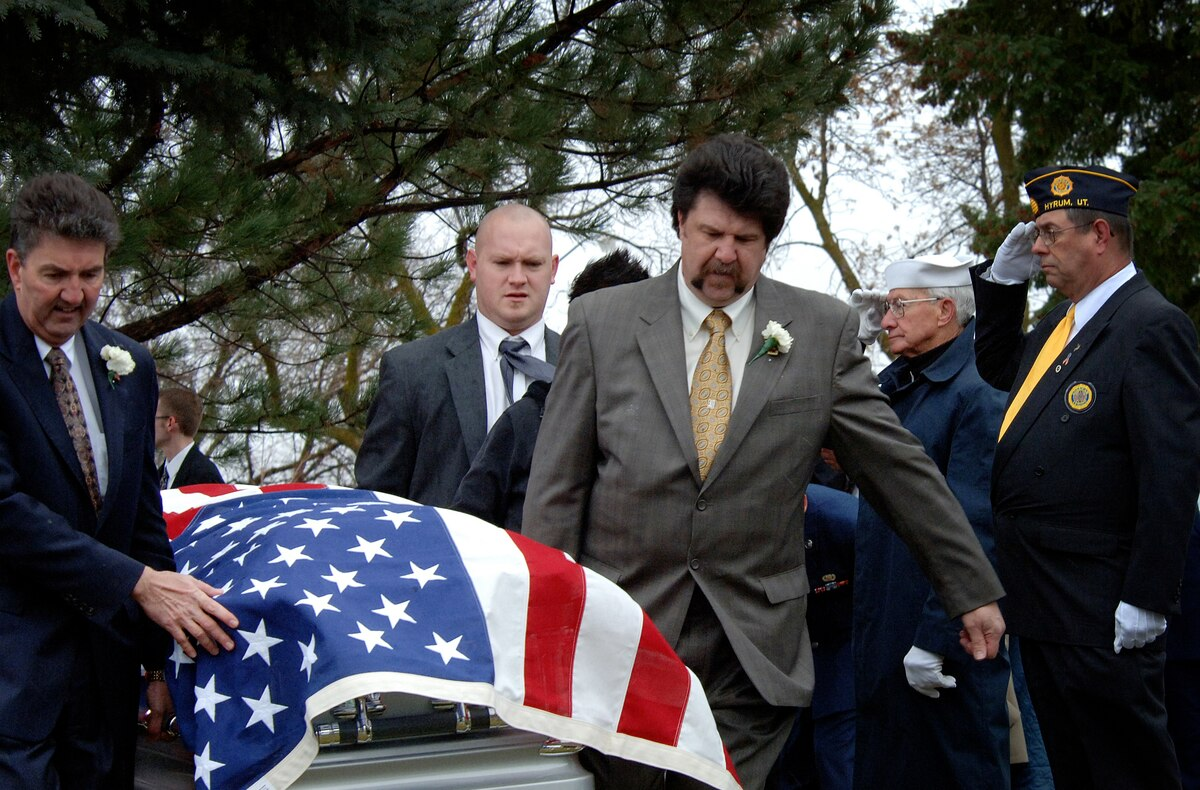
Funeral of Lt. Col. Chase J. Nielsen (2007)

Nielsen was married twice and had three children from his first marriage, and several grand and great-grandchildren.

After his retirement from the Air Force, Nielsen began a career as an industrial engineer with the Ogden Air Logistics Center at Hill Air Force Base, Utah. He retired in 1981.

Nielsen died at his home in Brigham City, Utah on March 23, 2007, at the age of 90. He was buried at Hyrum City Cemetery in Hyrum, Utah.

== Awards and honors ==
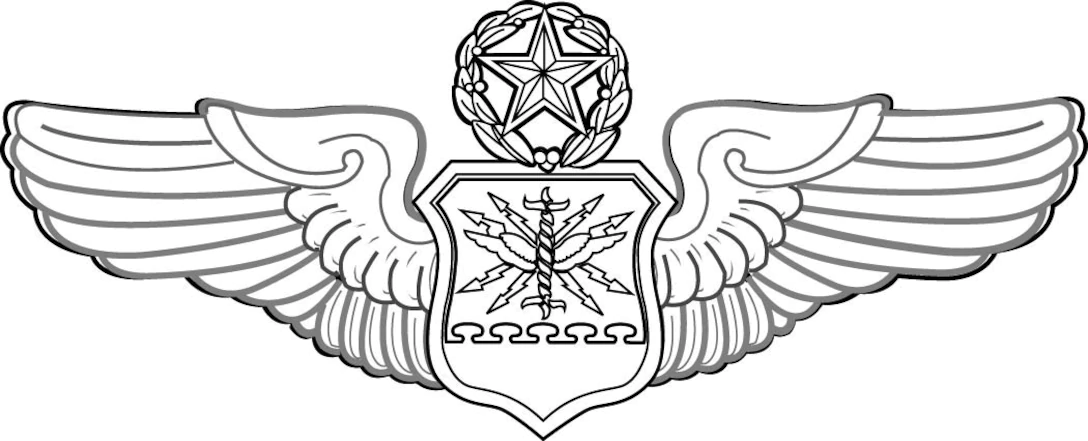

U.S. Air Force Master Navigator/Observer Badge
Distinguished Flying Cross		Purple Heart with bronze oak leaf cluster
Air Medal	Air Force Commendation Medal with bronze oak leaf cluster	Air Force Presidential Unit Citation with bronze oak leaf cluster
Air Force Outstanding Unit Award	Prisoner of War Medal	American Defense Service Medal
American Campaign Medal with service star	Asiatic–Pacific Campaign Medal with bronze campaign star	World War II Victory Medal
National Defense Service Medal with service star	Air Force Longevity Service Award with four bronze oak leaf clusters	Armed Forces Reserve Medal
Republic of China Medal of the Armed Forces; A-1	Republic of China Order of the Sacred Tripod	Republic of China War Memorial Medal

- In 2002, he was inducted into the Utah Aviation Hall of Fame.
