= List of Michigan Wolverines men's basketball seasons =

This is a list of seasons completed by the Michigan Wolverines men's basketball program. The team played its first game in January of 1909. The program has won two national championships: the 1988–89 and 2025–26 Wolverines. Michigan's highest-scoring team was the 1965–66 Wolverines, led by Cazzie Russell, which averaged 91.9 points per game. The 2025–26 Wolverines won the most total games, 37, and Big Ten Conference games, 19, which is a Big Ten record.

== Seasons ==
Record table
Season	Coach	Overall	Conference	Standing	Postseason
George Corneal (Independent) (1908–1909)
1908–09	George Corneal	1–4			
Elmer Mitchell (Big Ten Conference) (1917–1919)
1917–18	Elmer Mitchell	6–12	0–10	10th	
1918–19	Elmer Mitchell	16–8	5–5	4th	
E. J. Mather (Big Ten Conference) (1919–1928)
1919–20	E. J. Mather	10–13	3–9	T–7th	
1920–21	E. J. Mather	18–4	8–4	T–1st	
1921–22	E. J. Mather	15–4	8–4	T–2nd	
1922–23	E. J. Mather	11–4	8–4	3rd	
1923–24	E. J. Mather	10–7	6–6	7th	
1924–25	E. J. Mather	8–6	6–5	5th	
1925–26	E. J. Mather	12–5	8–4	T–1st	
1926–27	E. J. Mather	14–3	10–2	1st	
1927–28	E. J. Mather	10–7	7–5	5th	
George F. Veenker (Big Ten Conference) (1928–1931)
1928–29	George F. Veenker	13–3	10–2	T–1st	
1929–30	George F. Veenker	9–5	6–4	5th	
1930–31	George F. Veenker	13–4	8–4	T–2nd	
Franklin Cappon (Big Ten Conference) (1931–1938)
1931–32	Franklin Cappon	11–6	8–4	4th	
1932–33	Franklin Cappon	10–8	8–4	T–3rd	
1933–34	Franklin Cappon	6–14	4–8	T–8th	
1934–35	Franklin Cappon	8–12	2–10	9th	
1935–36	Franklin Cappon	15–5	7–5	T–3rd	
1936–37	Franklin Cappon	16–4	9–3	T–3rd	
1937–38	Franklin Cappon	12–8	6–6	T–5th	
Bennie Oosterbaan (Big Ten Conference) (1938–1946)
1938–39	Bennie Oosterbaan	11–9	4–8	T–7th	
1939–40	Bennie Oosterbaan	13–7	6–6	6th	
1940–41	Bennie Oosterbaan	9–10	5–7	7th	
1941–42	Bennie Oosterbaan	6–14	5–10	T–7th	
1942–43	Bennie Oosterbaan	10–8	4–8	8th	
1943–44	Bennie Oosterbaan	8–10	5–7	T–6th	
1944–45	Bennie Oosterbaan	12–7	5–7	5th	
1945–46	Bennie Oosterbaan	12–7	6–6	7th	
Osborne Cowles (Big Ten Conference) (1946–1948)
1946–47	Osborne Cowles	12–8	6–6	5th	
1947–48	Osborne Cowles	16–6	10–2	1st	NCAA Elite Eight
Ernie McCoy (Big Ten Conference) (1948–1952)
1948–49	Ernie McCoy	15–6	7–5	3rd	
1949–50	Ernie McCoy	11–11	4–8	T–6th	
1950–51	Ernie McCoy	7–15	3–11	T–9th	
1951–52	Ernie McCoy	7–15	4–10	T–8th	
William Perigo (Big Ten Conference) (1952–1960)
1952–53	William Perigo	6–16	3–15	T–9th	
1953–54	William Perigo	9–13	3–11	T–9th	
1954–55	William Perigo	11–11	5–9	T–6th	
1955–56	William Perigo	9–13	4–10	T–8th	
1956–57	William Perigo	13–9	8–6	T–5th	
1957–58	William Perigo	11–11	6–8	7th	
1958–59	William Perigo	15–7	8–6	T–2nd	
1959–60	William Perigo	4–20	1–13	10th	
Dave Strack (Big Ten Conference) (1960–1968)
1960–61	Dave Strack	6–18	2–12	10th	
1961–62	Dave Strack	7–17	5–9	8th	
1962–63	Dave Strack	16–8	8–6	T–4th	
1963–64	Dave Strack	23–5	11–3	T–1st	NCAA University Division Final Four
1964–65	Dave Strack	24–4	13–1	1st	NCAA University Division Runner-up
1965–66	Dave Strack	18–8	11–3	1st	NCAA University Division Elite Eight
1966–67	Dave Strack	8–16	2–12	10th	
1967–68	Dave Strack	11–13	6–8	T–7th	
Johnny Orr (Big Ten Conference) (1968–1980)
1968–69	Johnny Orr	13–11	7–7	4th	
1969–70	Johnny Orr	10–14	5–9	T–6th	
1970–71	Johnny Orr	19–7	12–2	2nd	NIT Quarterfinal
1971–72	Johnny Orr	14–10	9–5	T–3rd	
1972–73	Johnny Orr	13–11	6–8	T–6th	
1973–74	Johnny Orr	22–5	12–2	T–1st	NCAA Division I Elite Eight
1974–75	Johnny Orr	19–8	12–6	2nd	NCAA Division I first round
1975–76	Johnny Orr	25–7	14–4	2nd	NCAA Division I Runner-up
1976–77	Johnny Orr	26–4	16–2	1st	NCAA Division I Elite Eight
1977–78	Johnny Orr	16–11	11–7	T–4th	
1978–79	Johnny Orr	15–12	8–10	6th	
1979–80	Johnny Orr	17–13	8–10	T–6th	NIT Quarterfinal
Bill Frieder (Big Ten Conference) (1980–1989)
1980–81	Bill Frieder	19–11	8–10	7th	NIT Quarterfinal
1981–82	Bill Frieder	7–20	7–11	T–7th	
1982–83	Bill Frieder	15–13	7–11	9th	
1983–84	Bill Frieder	23–10	11–7	4th	NIT Champion
1984–85	Bill Frieder	26–4	16–2	1st	NCAA Division I second round
1985–86	Bill Frieder	28–5	14–4	1st	NCAA Division I second round
1986–87	Bill Frieder	20–12	10–8	5th	NCAA Division I second round
1987–88	Bill Frieder	26–8	13–5	2nd	NCAA Division I Sweet Sixteen
1988–89	Bill Frieder; Steve Fisher	30–7^{[Note A]}	12–6	3rd	NCAA Division I Champion
Steve Fisher (Big Ten Conference) (1989–1997)
1989–90	Steve Fisher	23–8	12–6	3rd	NCAA Division I second round
1990–91	Steve Fisher	14–15	7–11	8th	NIT first round
1991–92	Steve Fisher	25–9^{[Note B]}	11–7	T–3rd	NCAA Division I Runner-up
1992–93	Steve Fisher	31–5^{[Note C]}	15–3^{[Note C]}	2nd^{[Note C]}	NCAA Division I Runner-up
1993–94	Steve Fisher	24–8	13–5	2nd	NCAA Division I Elite Eight
1994–95	Steve Fisher	17–14	11–7	T–3rd	NCAA Division I first round
1995–96	Steve Fisher	21–11^{[Note C]}	10–8^{[Note C]}	T–5th^{[Note C]}	NCAA Division I first round
1996–97	Steve Fisher	24–11^{[Note C]}	9–9^{[Note C]}	T–6th^{[Note C]}	NIT Champion
Brian Ellerbe (Big Ten Conference) (1997–2001)
1997–98	Brian Ellerbe	25–9^{[Note D]}	11–5^{[Note D]}	4th^{[Note D]}	NCAA Division I second round
1998–99	Brian Ellerbe	12–19^{[Note D]}	5–11^{[Note D]}	T–9th^{[Note D]}	
1999–00	Brian Ellerbe	15–14	6–10	T–7th	NIT first round
2000–01	Brian Ellerbe	10–18	4–12	9th	
Tommy Amaker (Big Ten Conference) (2001–2007)
2001–02	Tommy Amaker	11–18	5–11	T–8th	
2002–03	Tommy Amaker	18–12	10–6	T–3rd	Ineligible^{[Note D]}
2003–04	Tommy Amaker	23–11	8–8	T–5th	NIT Champion
2004–05	Tommy Amaker	13–18	4–12	9th	
2005–06	Tommy Amaker	22–11	8–8	T–6th	NIT Runner-up
2006–07	Tommy Amaker	22–13	8–8	T–7th	NIT second round
John Beilein (Big Ten Conference) (2007–2019)
2007–08	John Beilein	10–22	5–13	T–9th	
2008–09	John Beilein	21–14	9–9	T–7th	NCAA Division I second round
2009–10	John Beilein	15–17	7–11	T–7th	
2010–11	John Beilein	21–14	9–9	T–4th	NCAA Division I third round
2011–12	John Beilein	24–10	13–5	T–1st	NCAA Division I second round
2012–13	John Beilein	31–8	12–6	T–4th	NCAA Division I Runner-up
2013–14	John Beilein	28–9	15–3	1st	NCAA Division I Elite Eight
2014–15	John Beilein	16–16	8–10	9th	
2015–16	John Beilein	23–13	10–8	8th	NCAA Division I first round
2016–17	John Beilein	26–12	10–8	T–5th	NCAA Division I Sweet Sixteen
2017–18	John Beilein	33–8	13–5	T–4th	NCAA Division I Runner-up
2018–19	John Beilein	30–7	15–5	3rd	NCAA Division I Sweet Sixteen
Juwan Howard (Big Ten Conference) (2019–2024)
2019–20	Juwan Howard	19–12	10–10	9th	No postseason (COVID-19)
2020–21	Juwan Howard	23–5	14–3	1st	NCAA Division I Elite Eight
2021–22	Juwan Howard	19–15^{[Note E]}	11–9^{[Note E]}	T–7th	NCAA Division I Sweet Sixteen
2022–23	Juwan Howard	18–16	11–9	T–5th	NIT second round
2023–24	Juwan Howard	8–24	3–17	14th	
Dusty May (Big Ten Conference) (2024–present)
2024–25	Dusty May	27–10	14–6	T–2nd	NCAA Division I Sweet Sixteen
2025–26	Dusty May	37–3	19–1	1st	NCAA Division I Champion
Total:		1,767–1,129^{[Note F]}			
National champion Postseason invitational champion Conference regular season champion Conference regular season and conference tournament champion Division regular season champion Division regular season and conference tournament champion Conference tournament champion

^A. Fisher served as interim coach during the 1989 NCAA tournament after Bill Frieder resigned. Michigan credits the 1988–89 regular season to Frieder and the NCAA tournament to Fisher.
^B. Michigan vacated its two 1992 Final Four games and its status as tournament runner-up. Official record is 24–8.
^C. Entire season, including postseason tournament appearances, later vacated by the school.
^D. Due to NCAA sanctions, a total of 36 wins were vacated: 24 wins from the 1997–98 season, including 11 Big Ten regular season wins, three wins in the Big Ten Tournament, and one win in the NCAA Tournament, and 12 wins in the 1998–99 season (including five Big Ten regular season wins). Michigan's 1998 Big Ten Tournament championship was also vacated. Originally, Michigan finished fourth in the Big Ten in 1997–98 and ninth in 1998–99. The punishment cost the 2002–2003 team its postseason eligibility.
^E. Head coach Juwan Howard was suspended for the final five regular season games of the 2021–22 season. Martelli served as interim head coach in his absence.
^F. Michigan's total record includes games subsequently vacated by the school.
