= Robert J. Meder =

Participant in the Doolittle Raid

Robert John Meder
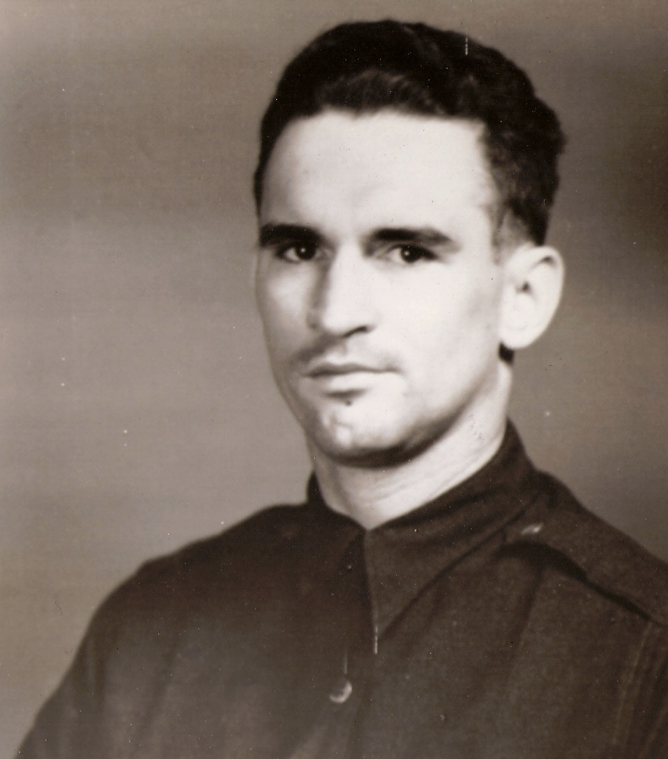
- Born: August 23, 1917; Cleveland, Ohio, U.S.
- Died: December 11, 1943 (aged 26); Nanjing, Jiangsu, Japanese-occupied China
- Burial place: Arlington National Cemetery
- Military career
- Allegiance: United States of America
- Branch: United States Army Air Corps; United States Army Air Forces
- Service years: 1940–1943
- Rank: First Lieutenant
- Nickname: "Bob"
- Units: 95th Bomb Squadron; 17th Bomb Group
- Conflicts: World War II
- Awards: Distinguished Flying Cross; Purple Heart

Robert John Meder (August 23, 1917 – December 1, 1943) was a lieutenant in the United States Army Air Forces who participated in the Doolittle Raid. In February 1942, he volunteered to participate in the raid, which took place on April 18 that year. Meder and his bomber crew was captured by the Japanese after the completion of his bombing mission. He died while in Japanese captivity in 1943.

== Early life ==
Meder was born on 1917 in Cleveland, Ohio, to Martin and Rose Meder. He graduated from Lakewood High School where he was a cheerleader and in 1935, he entered Miami University where he was a member of Phi Kappa Tau fraternity. He graduated in 1939 and worked as a salesperson.

== Military career ==
On November 22, 1940, he enlisted in the Aviation Cadet Program of the U.S. Army Air Corps and was commissioned a second lieutenant and awarded his pilot wings on July 12, 1941. After receiving his pilot wings, he was assigned as a B-25 Mitchell pilot with the 95th Bomb Squadron of the 17th Bomb Group at Pendleton Army Airfield in Oregon, in July 1941. Following the Japanese attack on Pearl Harbor on December 7, 1941, the 17th BG immediately began anti-submarine patrols off the coast of Oregon and Washington.

=== Doolittle Raid ===
The crew of the Green Hornet (crew #6) just before take off for the mission on USS Hornet (CV-8), 18 April 1942.(Left to right) Lt. Chase J. Nielsen (navigator), Lt. Dean E. Hallmark (pilot), Sgt. Donald E. Fitzmaurice (engineer-gunner), Lt. Robert J. Meder (co-pilot) and Sgt. William J Dieter (bombardier)

In February 1942, Meder volunteered for a "secret mission", which ended up being the critical Doolittle Raid. Led by Lieutenant Colonel Jimmy Doolittle, the raid was daring not only because of the intended targets, the Japanese homeland, but because the pilots trained to take-off in a B-25 bomber from the deck of an aircraft carrier, something neither the designers of the B-25, nor the aircraft carrier, ever envisioned.

Meder was the navigator for sixth bomber, plane# 40-2298 nicknamed "The Green Hornet", to depart the deck of the USS Hornet during the mission. On April 18, 1942, Meder and his B-25's four crewmembers, took off from the Hornet and reached Tokyo, Japan. They bombed their target; a steel mill in the north of the city. They then headed for their recovery airfield in China. Running low on fuel due to the early launch of the raid, the B-25s failed to reach any of the designated safety zones in China. The pilot of Meder's bomber, First Lieutenant Dean E. Hallmark, was forced to ditch at sea off the coast of Wenzhou, China. Staff Seargent William J. Dieter (bombardier) and Sergeant Donald E. Fitzmaurice (gunner) drowned when the aircraft ditched into the sea, while Meder, Hallmark and navigator Chase Nielsen managed to swim ashore. The next day, they buried the bodies of Fitzmaurice and Dieter.

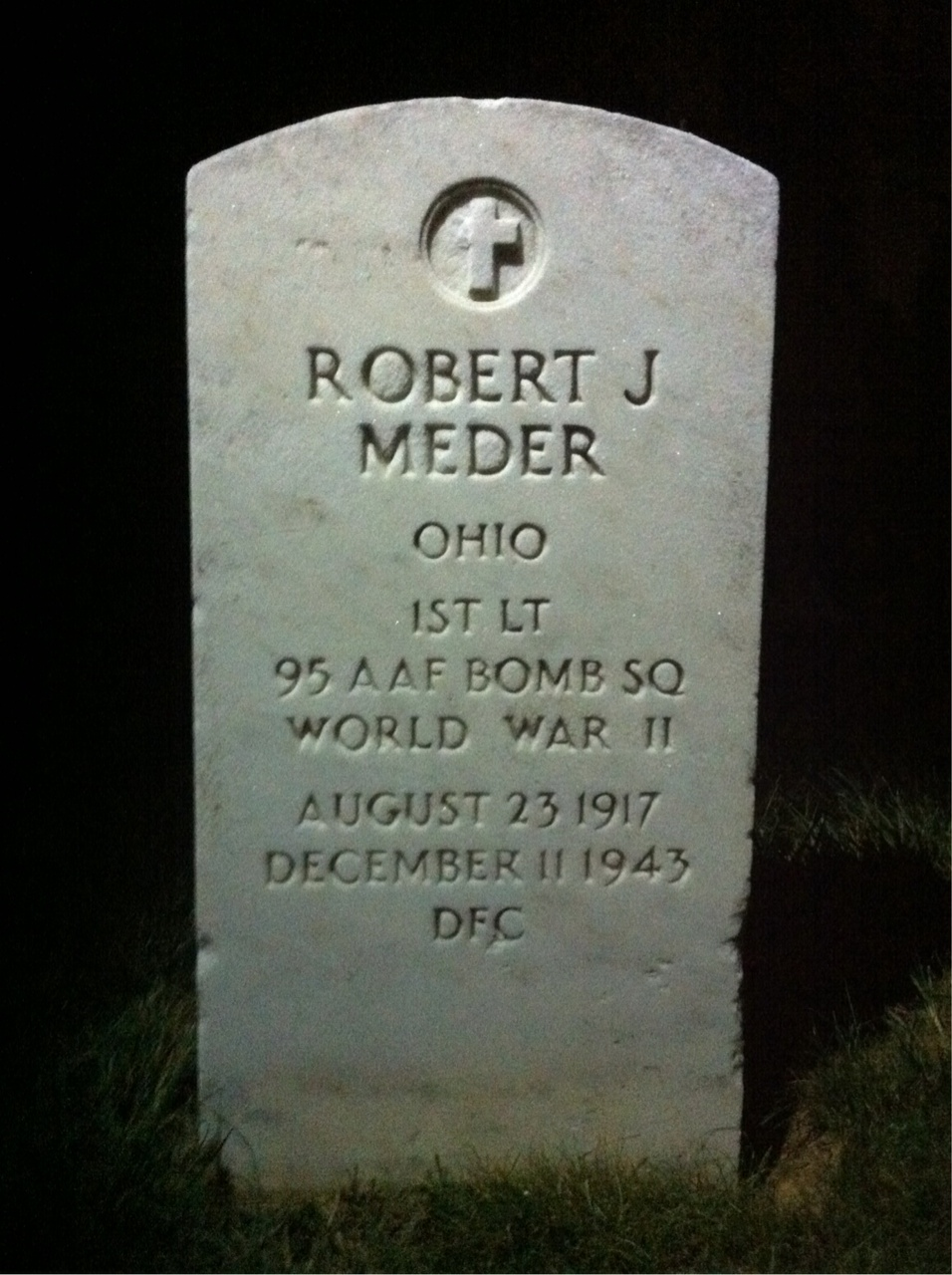
Meder's grave at Arlington National Cemetery

On April 27, as they tried to reach safety with the help of friendly local Chinese, all three men were captured by Japanese troops and interred as POWs in Shanghai, along with crew of the sixteenth bomber. Meder and other American prisoners were held in solitary confinement, where they were threatened and tortured by the Japanese, but resisted weeks of interrogation. The Japanese government sentenced all the eight prisoners to death and after a mock trial on October 14, 1942, Dean E. Hallmark, Second Lieutenant William G. Farrow (pilot of bomber#16) and Sergeant Harold A. Spatz (gunner of bomber#16) were selected for execution, while the Japanese commuted others to life in prison. The three men were executed on October 15, 1942, at Shanghai’s Public Cemetery No. 1.

Meder and other prisoners of the raid were placed in solitary confinement and on the anniversary of the Doolittle Raid in 1943, the prisoners were transferred to a military prison at Nanjing, where they were able to exercise with each other for 30 minutes each day. Months of starvation and disease resulted in Meder becoming weaker and requiring medical assistance. He died of malnutrition and beri-beri on December 1, 1943, while still in captivity. His death resulted in the improvements of conditions for the remaining prisoners of the raid. He was cremated by the Japanese and his ashes, along with that of Farrow, Spatz and Hallmark, were located after the war and returned home. On January 17, 1949, Meder was buried with full military honors at Section 12, Site 159 of Arlington National Cemetery.

== Awards and honors ==

Army Air Forces Pilot Badge
Distinguished Flying Cross	Purple Heart	Prisoner of War Medal
American Defence Service Medal	American Campaign Medal w/ 1 bronze service star	Asiatic-Pacific Campaign Medal w/ 1 bronze campaign star
World War II Victory Medal	Order of the Sacred Tripod; Republic of China	China War Memorial Medal; Republic of China

Meder was posthumously given multiple awards. These included the Order of the Sacred Tripod (寶鼎勳章) of the Republic of China, the Distinguished Flying Cross, and the Purple Heart. He was also awarded the Prisoner of War Medal, which, by authorization of Congress in 1985, was given to all members of the United States Armed Forces who had been a prisoner of war after April 5, 1917.

An extremely compelling story of Meder's experience is related in the 1947 book, Deadline Delayed in a chapter titled "Tea and Ashes" by NBC's Irene Kuhn, a member of the Overseas Press Club of America. He is a charter member of the Phi Kappa Tau Hall of Fame and a member of the Lakewood High School Hall of Fame. Miami University's squadron of the Arnold Air Society, the Air Force ROTC honor society is named the Robert J. Meder Squadron in his memory.
