= Vail, Iowa =

City in Iowa, United States

- City
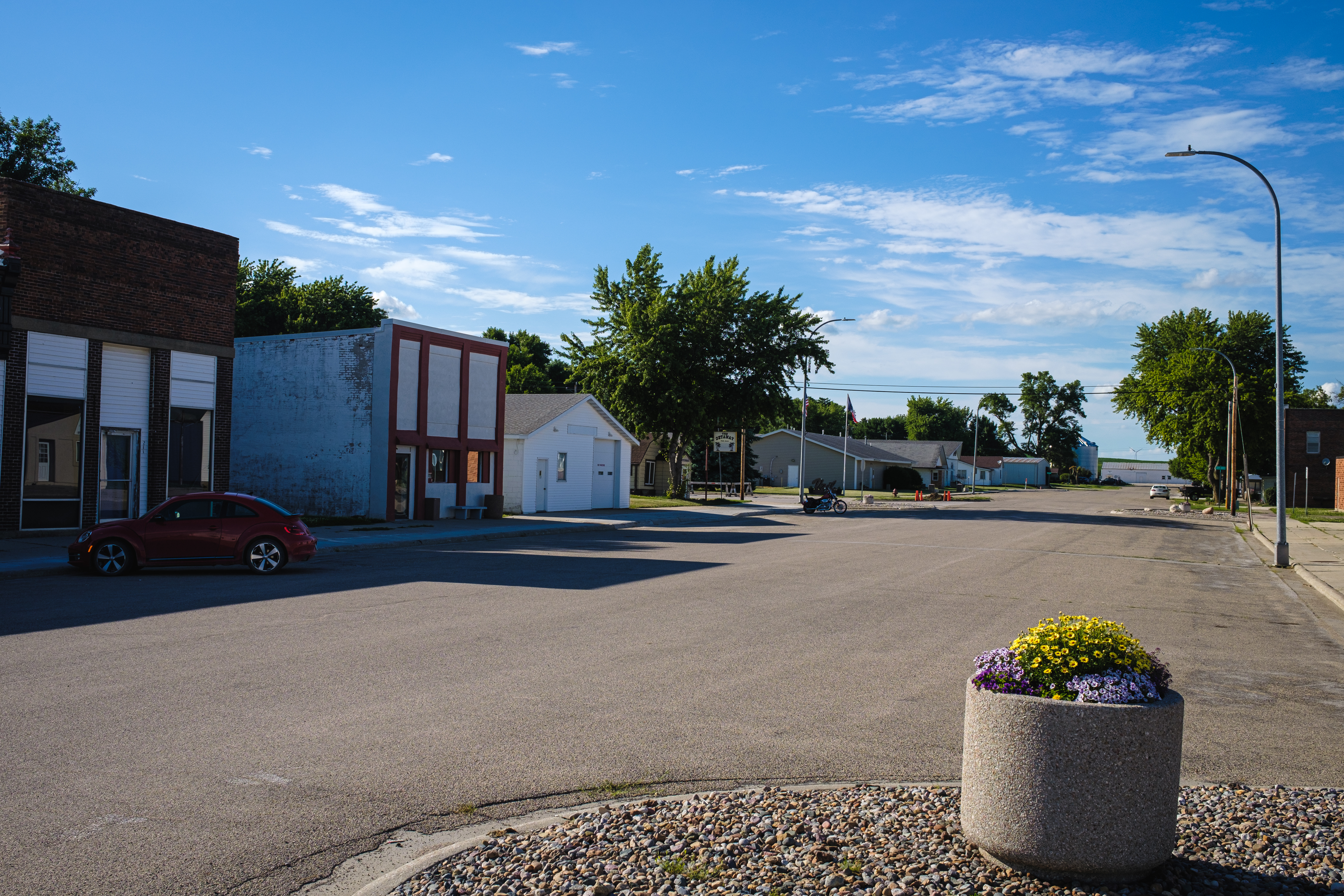
- Main Street

- Location of Vail, Iowa
- Coordinates: 42°03′35″N 95°12′02″W
- Country: USA
- State: Iowa
- County: Crawford

Area
  - Total: 0.57 sq mi (1.48 km^{2})
  - Land: 0.57 sq mi (1.48 km^{2})
  - Water: 0 sq mi (0.00 km^{2})
- Elevation: 1,260 ft (380 m)

Population (2020)
  - Total: 396
  - Density: 694.3/sq mi (268.07/km^{2})
- Time zone: UTC-6 (Central (CST))
  - Summer (DST): UTC-5 (CDT)
- ZIP code: 51465
- Area code: 712
- FIPS code: 19-80130
- GNIS feature ID: 2397107

Vail is a city in Crawford County, Iowa, United States. The population was 396 at the time of the 2020 census.

== History ==
Vail was laid out in 1871, and incorporated in 1875. The city was named for C. E. Vail, a relative of railroad magnate John Insley Blair.

== Geography ==
According to the United States Census Bureau, the city has a total area of 0.57 square miles (1.48 km^{2}), all land.

== Demographics ==
Historical populations
Year	Pop.	±%
1880	511	—
1890	538	+5.3%
1900	578	+7.4%
1910	631	+9.2%
1920	635	+0.6%
1930	622	−2.0%
1940	576	−7.4%
1950	532	−7.6%
1960	473	−11.1%
1970	486	+2.7%
1980	490	+0.8%
1990	388	−20.8%
2000	452	+16.5%
2010	436	−3.5%
2020	396	−9.2%
Source:"U.S. Census website". United States Census Bureau. and Iowa Data Center; Source: U.S. Decennial Census

=== 2020 census ===
As of the census of 2020, there were 396 people, 167 households, and 111 families residing in the city. The population density was 694.3 inhabitants per square mile (268.1/km^{2}). There were 186 housing units at an average density of 326.1 per square mile (125.9/km^{2}). The racial makeup of the city was 75.0% White, 1.8% Black or African American, 0.0% Native American, 0.0% Asian, 0.0% Pacific Islander, 11.9% from other races and 11.4% from two or more races. Hispanic or Latino persons of any race comprised 22.7% of the population.

Of the 167 households, 30.5% of which had children under the age of 18 living with them, 47.9% were married couples living together, 3.0% were cohabitating couples, 25.1% had a female householder with no spouse or partner present and 24.0% had a male householder with no spouse or partner present. 33.5% of all households were non-families. 29.9% of all households were made up of individuals, 12.0% had someone living alone who was 65 years old or older.

The median age in the city was 41.3 years. 28.0% of the residents were under the age of 20; 4.0% were between the ages of 20 and 24; 22.0% were from 25 and 44; 27.3% were from 45 and 64; and 18.7% were 65 years of age or older. The gender makeup of the city was 48.0% male and 52.0% female.

=== 2010 census ===
As of the census of 2010, there were 436 people, 174 households, and 120 families living in the city. The population density was 764.9 inhabitants per square mile (295.3/km^{2}). There were 189 housing units at an average density of 331.6 per square mile (128.0/km^{2}). The racial makeup of the city was 89.2% White, 0.7% African American, 0.9% Native American, 8.9% from other races, and 0.2% from two or more races. Hispanic or Latino of any race were 12.4% of the population.

There were 174 households, of which 35.1% had children under the age of 18 living with them, 55.2% were married couples living together, 8.6% had a female householder with no husband present, 5.2% had a male householder with no wife present, and 31.0% were non-families. 27.6% of all households were made up of individuals, and 15% had someone living alone who was 65 years of age or older. The average household size was 2.51 and the average family size was 3.00.

The median age in the city was 42.3 years. 27.3% of residents were under the age of 18; 6.1% were between the ages of 18 and 24; 20.3% were from 25 to 44; 31.2% were from 45 to 64; and 15.1% were 65 years of age or older. The gender makeup of the city was 47.0% male and 53.0% female.

=== 2000 census ===
As of the census of 2000, there were 452 people, 185 households, and 128 families living in the city. The population density was 808.0 inhabitants per square mile (312.0/km^{2}). There were 196 housing units at an average density of 350.4 per square mile (135.3/km^{2}). The racial makeup of the city was 97.57% White, 0.88% African American, 0.22% Asian, 1.33% from other races. Hispanic or Latino of any race were 1.77% of the population.

There were 185 households, out of which 35.7% had children under the age of 18 living with them, 53.0% were married couples living together, 9.2% had a female householder with no husband present, and 30.8% were non-families. 28.1% of all households were made up of individuals, and 15.7% had someone living alone who was 65 years of age or older. The average household size was 2.44 and the average family size was 2.95.

28.1% are under the age of 18, 7.1% from 18 to 24, 25.4% from 25 to 44, 21.5% from 45 to 64, and 17.9% who were 65 years of age or older. The median age was 37 years. For every 100 females, there were 100.0 males. For every 100 females age 18 and over, there were 100.6 males.

The median income for a household in the city was $33,750, and the median income for a family was $39,107. Males had a median income of $24,500 versus $19,063 for females. The per capita income for the city was $15,071. About 6.2% of families and 7.0% of the population were below the poverty line, including 7.8% of those under age 18 and 12.5% of those age 65 or over.

== Education ==
The Ar-We-Va Community School District operates local area schools.

== Notable person ==
- SSgt. William 'Billy Jack' Dieter, bombardier on crew #6 on the Doolittle Raid
