= William John Dieter =

United States Army Air Forces airman

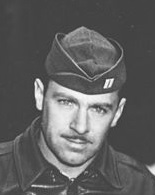
- Born: October 5, 1912; Vail, Iowa, U.S.
- Died: April 18, 1942 (aged 29); Coast of Shipu Town in Ningbo, China
- Burial place: Golden Gate National Cemetery
- Military career
- Allegiance: United States of America
- Branch: United States Army; United States Army Air Corps; United States Army Air Forces
- Service years: 1936–1942
- Rank: Staff Sergeant
- Nickname: "Billy Jack"
- Units: 95th Bomb Squadron; 17th Bomb Group
- Conflicts: World War II • Doolittle Raid (KIA)
- Awards: Distinguished Flying Cross; Purple Heart

William "Billy Jack" Dieter (October 5, 1912 – April 18, 1942) was a sergeant in the United States Army Air Corps. He was a bombardier on the Green Hornet, the sixth plane to take off from a US carrier as part of the Doolittle Raid, a bold long-range retaliatory air raid on the Japanese main islands, on April 18, 1942, four months after the attack on Pearl Harbor. The attack was a major morale booster for the United States. Dieter was one of only three airmen to die in the raid itself, when his B-25 Mitchell, 'Green Hornet', crashed on the coast of China, having run out of fuel.

== Early life and education ==
Dieter was born on October 5, 1912, in Vail, Iowa, to Jesse T. Dieter and Mary McCalpin Dieter. After living in Vail, the family moved to South Dakota, Potosi, Missouri, and eventually, Tulelake, California. Dieter attended only one year of high school.

== Military career ==
Dieter then enlisted in the Field Artillery on October 29, 1936, at Vancouver Barracks in Washington. He served a three-year term, then left the Army. After finding it difficult to find work, he enlisted in the United States Army Air Corps on December 12, 1940.

Dieter was trained as a bombardier, and served as a Douglas B-18 Bolo and North American B-25 Mitchell bombardier with the 95th Bomb Squadron of the 17th Bomb Group at McChord Field in Washington, and then at Pendleton Field in Oregon, until he was selected for the mission to be led by James Doolittle in February 1942.

=== Doolittle Raid ===
The crew of the Green Hornet (crew #6) just before take off for the mission on USS Hornet (CV-8), 18 April 1942. Left to right: Lt. Chase J. Nielsen (navigator), Lt. Dean E. Hallmark (pilot), Sgt. Donald E. Fitzmaurice (engineer-gunner), Lt. Robert J. Meder (co-pilot), Sgt. William J Dieter (bombardier).

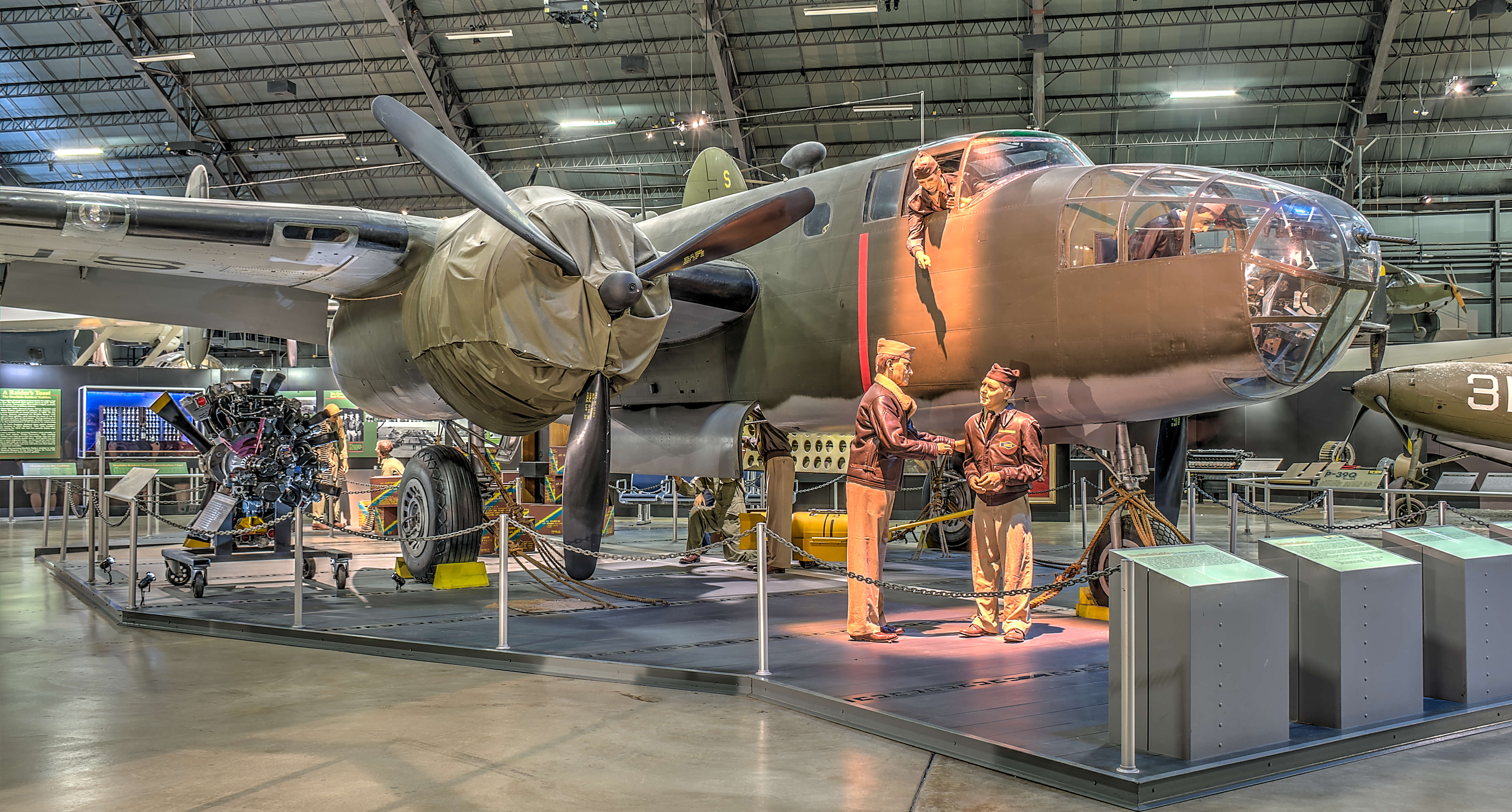
Exhibit at USAF Museum depicting a B-25B Mitchell in preparation for the Doolittle Raid

In early 1942, then Lieutenant Colonel James Doolittle volunteered for and received General H.H. Arnold's approval to lead the top secret attack of 16 B-25 medium bombers from the aircraft carrier USS Hornet, with targets in Tokyo, Kobe, Yokohama, Osaka and Nagoya.

After training at Eglin Field and Wagner Field in northwest Florida, Dieter and the other volunteer flight crew members proceeded to McClellan Field, California for aircraft modifications at the Sacramento Air Depot, followed by a short final flight to Naval Air Station Alameda, California for embarkation aboard the aircraft carrier USS Hornet.

On April 18, 16 North American B-25 Mitchell crews took off from the Hornet, reached Japan, and bombed their targets. Dieter was the bombardier in the sixth plane, the 'Green Hornet', piloted by 1st Lt. Dean E. Hallmark and 2nd Lt. Robert J. Meder.

While one crew chose to land in Russia due to their bomber's unusually high fuel consumption, the other fifteen planes then headed for their recovery airfields in China. Most of the other crewmen who participated in the one-way mission bailed out over China when their B-25s ran out of fuel; however, the Green Hornet crashed near the coast of China. Dieter and fellow crew member S/Sgt. Donald E. Fitzmaurice drowned while trying to swim to shore (possibly due to internal injuries suffered in the crash), while the other three crew members of the 'Green Hornet' were captured shortly afterwards by the Japanese.

The following is an excerpt from a letter written in August, 1945, by Earl L. Deiter, S.J. (Capt), Chaplain, U.S. Army. Note that all spelling, capitalization, and punctuation are "as is" in the original.

"1st. Lt. Dean E. Hallmark was pilot of the plane on which Lt. Neilson was Navigator and Bill was Bombadier. They flew from the Hornet directly over Tokyo and Bill dropped his bombs 100% on his target, a large steel mill. The pilot headed for China, and at about 8:30 the night of April 18, 1942, while flying very low over the water, he noticed the gas tanks were empty and gave the order to prepare to crash. Hardly had the order been given, and without much preparation, (when?) the plane crashed into the sea, just a few hundred yards from the coast. Bill was riding in the nose of the plane, and when the plane crashed, the nose was broken open, apparently swooping Bill out of the plane. Capt. Nielson said that when he got out of his position, Bill was already standing on top of the plane, and that he said, "I am hurt all over". They all adjusted their life belts, and started swimming to shore. Lt. Hallmark was helping Corporal Donald Fitzmaurice of Lincoln, Neb., and someone was helping Bill. When Lt. Neilson reached shore he said he was exhausted and collapsed. On awakening the next morning, he saw the bodies of Bill and Corp. Fitzmaurice which had washed ashore. Upon examing the body of Bill carefully, he noticed quite a few bruises which obviously hindered Bill from swimming and staying afloat, but apparently he became exhausted while still in the water and no doubt drowning was the cause of his death."

"The shore where the accident took place was at the foot of a little village of 300 or 400 people, named Shipu, which in turn was about 20 or 30 miles south of Ningpo. Any large map of China will show the town of Ningpo. The native Chinese built a coffin for Bill and Fitzmaurice, and buried the both of them just over a little knoll a few yards back from the shore where the accident happened."

As noted in the letter, Dieter was originally interred at Shantou, China by Chinese civilians. His body was returned to the States for reburial after interment at Schofield Barracks, Mausoleum #2 in Oahu, Hawaii. In 1949, his body was relocated permanently to Golden Gate National Cemetery.

== Legacy ==
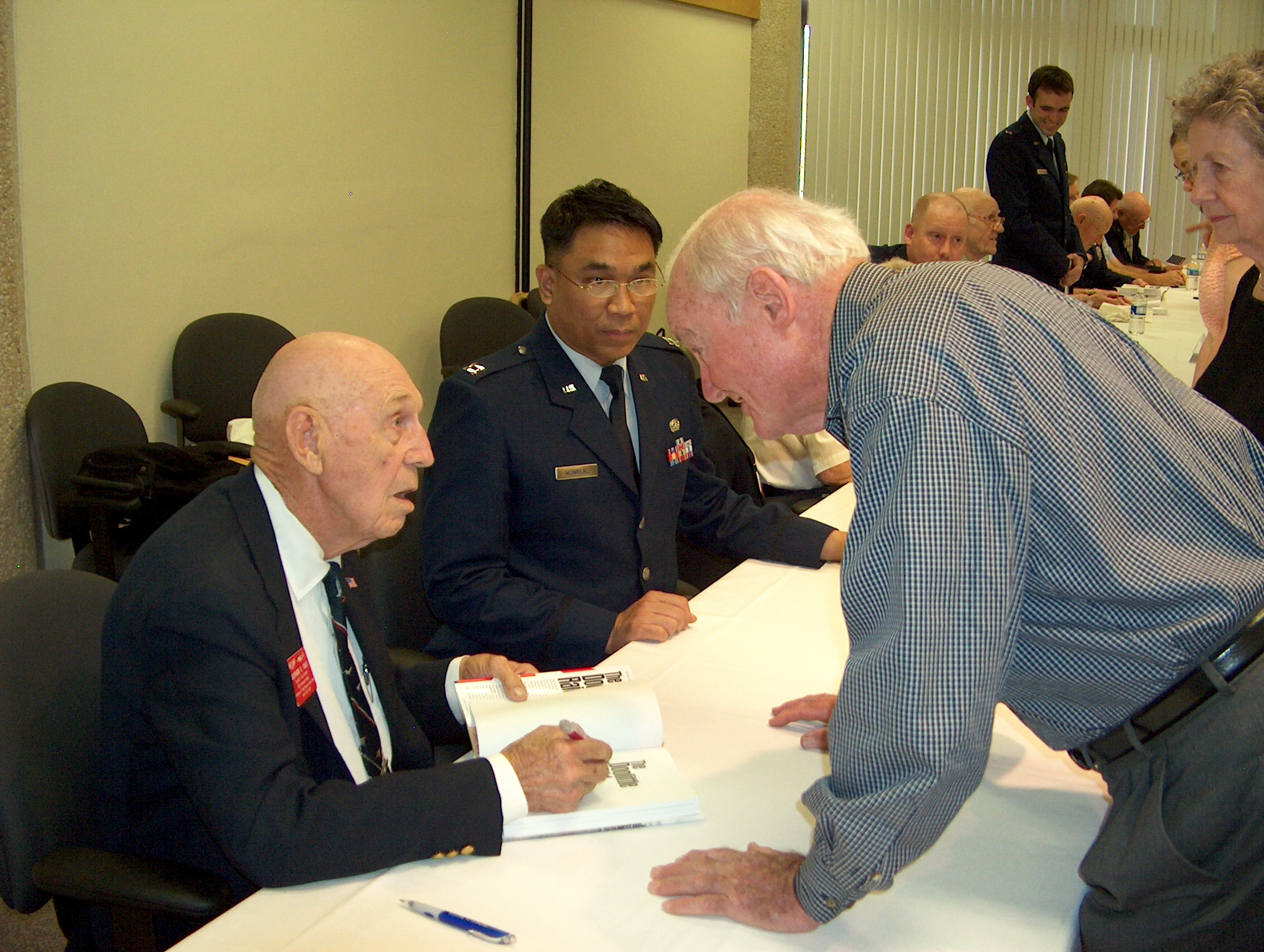
Dieter's cousin, George A. McCalpin, a WWII Army veteran(right) talking to Lt. Col. Richard E. Cole (seated) about Dieter, at the 66th anniversary reunion at the University of Texas in April 2008

The Doolittle Raid is viewed by historians as a major morale-building victory for the United States. Although the damage done to Japanese war industry was minor, the raid showed the Japanese that their homeland was vulnerable to air attack, and forced them to withdraw several front-line fighter units from Pacific war zones for homeland defense. More significantly, Japanese commanders considered the raid deeply embarrassing, and their attempt to close the perceived gap in their Pacific defense perimeter led directly to the decisive American victory at the Battle of Midway in June 1942.

When asked from where the Tokyo raid was launched, President Roosevelt coyly said its base was Shangri-La, a fictional paradise from the popular novel Lost Horizon. In the same vein, the U.S. Navy named one of its Essex-class fleet carriers the USS Shangri-La.

== Military awards ==
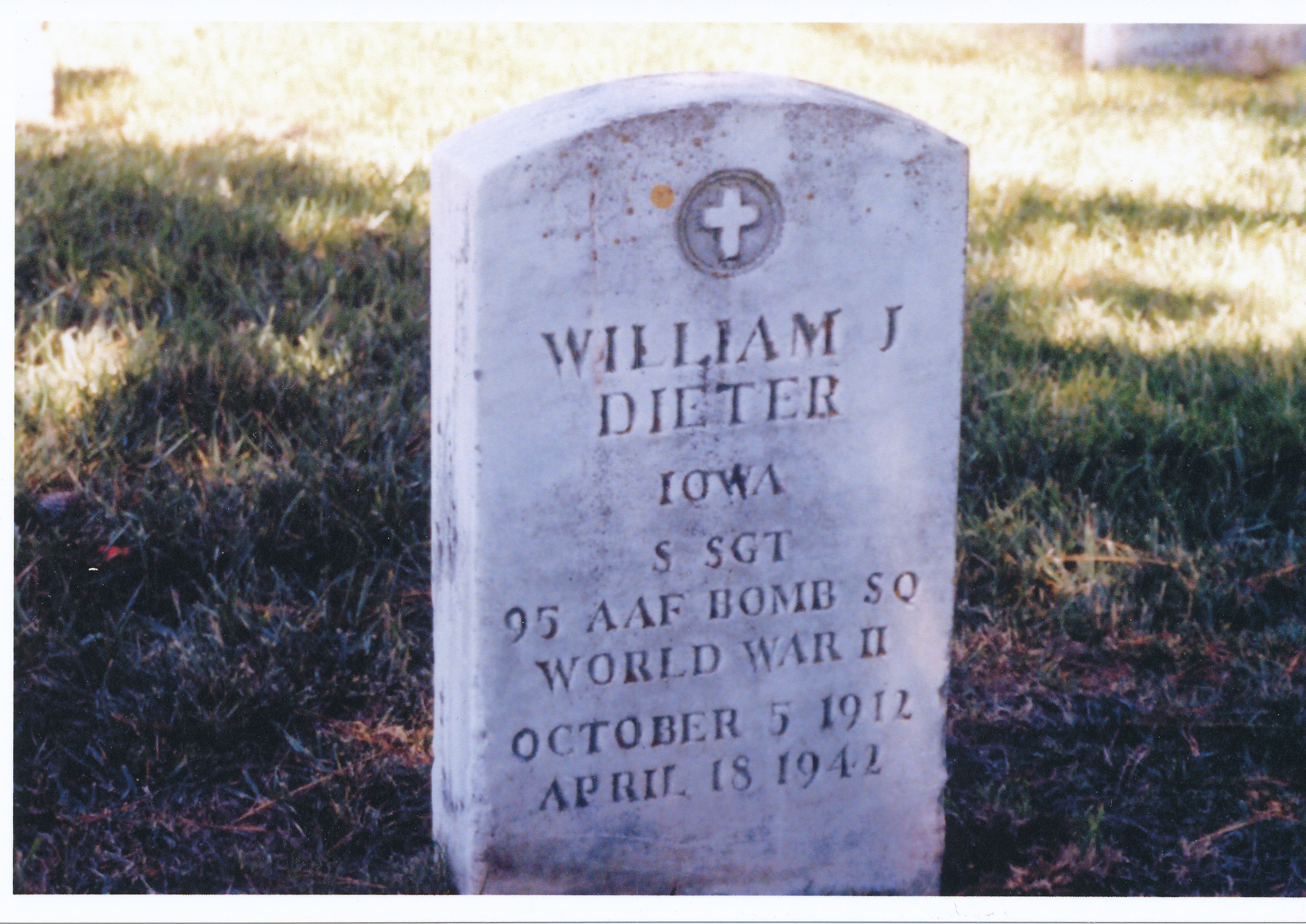
Dieter's grave marker in Golden Gate National Cemetery.

Dieter’s military and civilian decorations include the following:

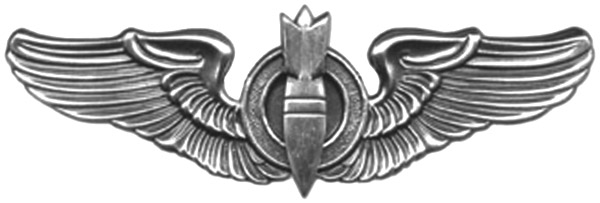

USAAF Bombardier Badge
| Distinguished Flying Cross | | Purple Heart |
| Army Good Conduct Medal | American Defense Service Medal | Asiatic-Pacific Campaign Medal with bronze campaign star |
| World War II Victory Medal | Order of Yung Hui, 5th Class (Republic of China) | War Memorial Medal (Republic of China) |

== Other awards and honors ==
Dieter also received the following awards and honors:

Awards

- On May 23, 2014, Dieter and the other Doolittle Raiders were awarded the Congressional Gold Medal; "(t)o award a Congressional Gold Medal to the World War II members of the "Doolittle Tokyo Raiders", for outstanding heroism, valor, skill, and service to the United States in conducting the bombings of Tokyo."

Honors

- Inducted into the Iowa Aviation Museum at Greenfield, Iowa in 2014
