= Stanley C. Cox =

American physician (1883–1942)

- Born: July 2, 1883; South Hadley, Massachusetts
- Died: June 7, 1942 (aged 58); Holyoke, Massachusetts
- Education: University of Michigan
- Basketball career

Career information
- College: Michigan

Stanley Cullen Cox (July 2, 1883 – June 7, 1942) was an American physician who was the head of the Medical Division of the Office of Civilian Defense at the time of his death in 1942. He was born in 1884 in South Hadley, Massachusetts. He attended Holyoke High School and Williston Academy before enrolling at the University of Michigan. He received a bachelor's degree from Michigan in 1908 and a medical degree in 1910. While attending Michigan, he played on the school's first basketball team, the 1908–09 Michigan Wolverines men's basketball team. After receiving his medical degree from Michigan, Cox was employed at Gouverneur Hospital in New York for two years. He then returned to Holyoke, Massachusetts, where he went into private practice. He served as a military surgeon during World War I and became the head of the Medical Division of the Office of Civilian Defense during World War II. He was married to Almira Fay Leavitt in June 1912. They had three daughters and two sons. He died at age 58 in June 1942 from a heart attack while marching in an "On To Victory" parade in Holyoke.
