= Henry Hallowell Farquhar =

American academic and writer (1884–1968)

Personal information
- Born: July 13, 1884 Sandy Spring, Maryland
- Died: December 15, 1968 (aged 84)

Career information
- College: Michigan

Henry Hallowell Farquhar (July 13, 1884 – December 15, 1968) was an American academic, writer, and businessman. Attending the University of Michigan, he excelled in basketball and played on the school's first team. He was on the faculty at Harvard Business School in the 1910s and 1920s and published extensively in the area of factory and industrial management. He was a proponent of Frederick Taylor's principles of scientific management.

== Early years ==
Farquhar was born in Maryland in July 1884. He attended the University of Michigan. He played on the school's first basketball team, the 1908–09 Michigan Wolverines men's basketball team. On January 9, 1909, he scored 10 of Michigan's 16 points in the school's first intercollegiate basketball game, a 24–16 loss to Michigan Agricultural College (now known as Michigan State University). In the final game of a short five-game season, Farquhar scored 16 of Michigan's 24 points, on four field goals and eight free throws, in a 42–24 loss to Ohio State. He was also the team's leading scorer for the season with 48 points in five games.

From 1909 to 1914, Farquhar worked for the U. S. Department of Agriculture and published several articles on forestry. He subsequently enrolled at the Harvard Business School and received his M.B.A. in 1916.

== Academic and author ==
Farquhar joined the faculty at Harvard Business School as an instructor in scientific management theory from 1916 to 1920. He became an assistant professor of industrial management in 1920 and served in that capacity until 1925. Farquhar was also a published author, writing mostly on topics concerning industrial management. His works include:

- "A Technique for Enlisting Employee Cooperation in the Improvement of Administration," Personnel, May 1946, 8 pages.
- "The Anomaly of Functional Authority at the Top," Advanced Management, Vol. 7, No. 2 (April–June, 1942), p. 51.
- "A Critical Analysis of Scientific Management," Bulletin of the Taylor Society, February 1924.
- "Measuring the Performance of the Production Department," Harvard Business Review, April 1923.
- "Factory Storeskeeping: The Control and Storage of Materials," McGraw-Hill Book Company, 1922, 176 pages;
- "Incentive or Production Basis of Wage Payment," American Machinist, 1921.
- "How Do You Regulate Materials?," American Machinist, 1920
- "Factory Nicknames That Save Time," Factory, 1919.
- "Positive Contributions of Scientific Management: The Elimination of Some Losses Characteristic of Present-Day Manufacture," The Quarterly Journal of Economics (1919), 38 pages.
- "Factory Management, or Business Management," 1918.
- "Which Machine Shall Come First?," Factory, July 1917.
- "The Introduction of Scientific Management into a Woodworking Shop," Harvard University, Graduate School of Business Administration, 1916, 80 pages.
- "Mountain Logging in West Virginia," Journal of Forestry, 1909.

== Later years and family ==
In 1925, Farquhar became the comptroller for A. L. Smith Iron Works in Chelsea, Massachusetts. By 1930, he was living in Hastings-on-Hudson, New York, and working as an industrial manager for a bank. In 1942, he was living in Alexandria, Virginia, and working for the U.S. Forest Service, Department of Agriculture.

Farquhar was married to Elizabeth Farquhar. They had two daughters, Anne and Lydia. Farquhar died in December 1968 at age 84. He was living in Talbot County, Maryland when he died. Farquhar's papers are housed at the Baker Library at Harvard Business School.

== Archives and records ==
- Henry Hallowell Farquhar papers at Baker Library Special Collections, Harvard Business School.
