= John L. Koprowski =

American biologist

John Lad Koprowski
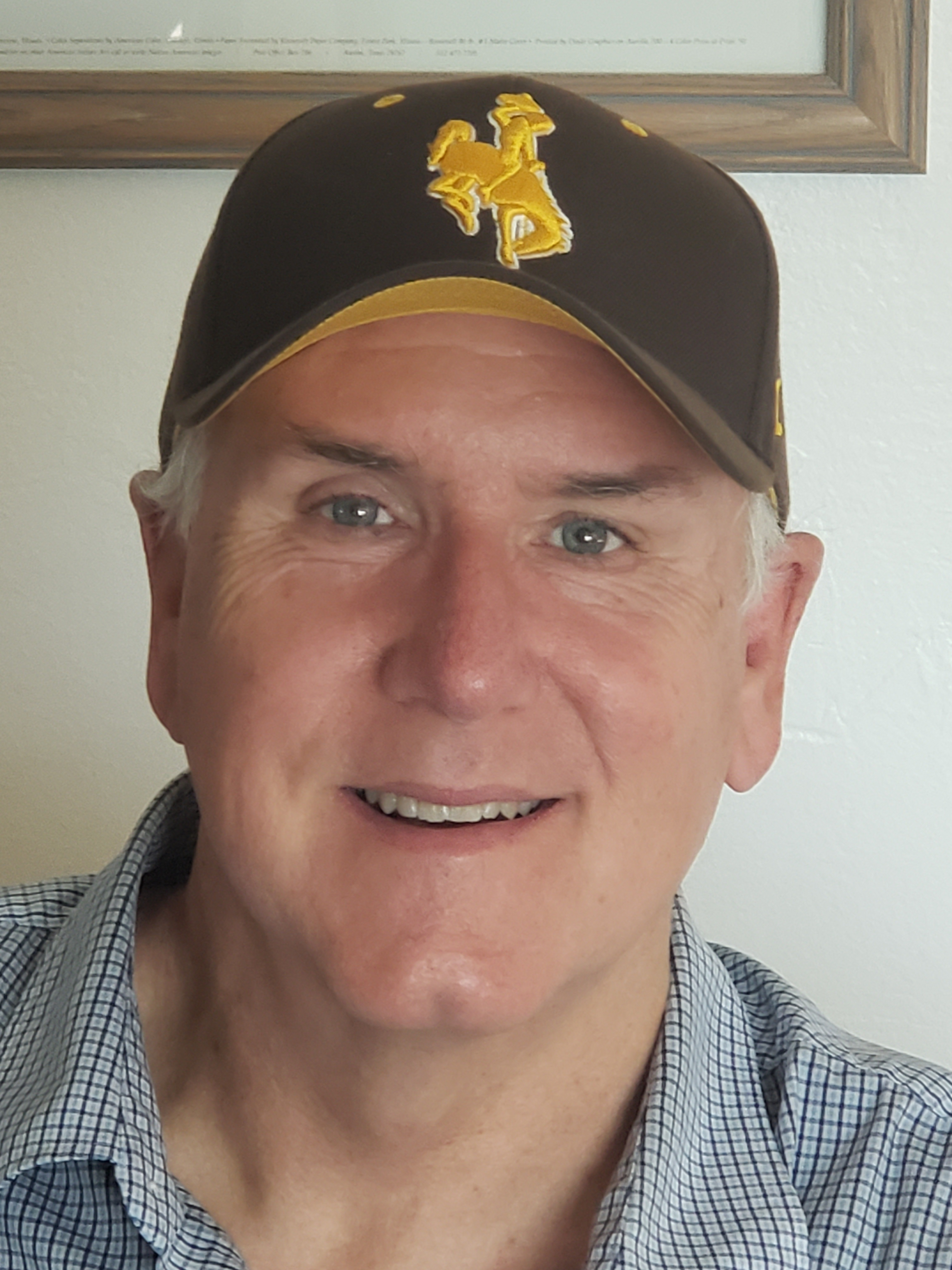
- Born: 29 September 1961 (age 65); Lakewood, Ohio
- Citizenship: United States of America
- Education: Ohio State University; Southern Illinois University; University of Kansas
- Known for: Dean, Haub School of Environment & Natural Resources at University of Wyoming; Director, Mount Graham Biological Program at University of Arizona; Extensive expertise in the ecology and conservation of wildlife
- Awards: Aldo Leopold Memorial Award, The Wildlife Society (2022); Doctor Honoris Causa, Institute of Biology, Mongolian Academy of Sciences (2025); Fellow, The Explorers Club (2023); Fellow, American Association for the Advancement of Science (2018); Fellow, Linnean Society of London (2019); Fellow, The Wildlife Society (2016); IUCN North American Coordinator-Small Mammals (2010); Western National Parks Association’s Emil W. Haury Award for Outstanding Achievement in Science in the National Park (1999)
- Scientific career
- Fields: Conservation biology of terrestrial vertebrates, behavioral and population ecology, social behavior, forest management, urban wildlife, threatened and endangered species, ecology and conservation of squirrels, climate change

John L. Koprowski (born 1961) is a Dean and Professor, Haub School of Environment & Natural Resources, University of Wyoming, mammalogist, conservation biologist, and leading expert on the ecology and conservation of wildlife, especially squirrels.

== Education ==
John Koprowski was born in Lakewood, Ohio. He graduated from Lakewood High School in Lakewood, Ohio, in June 1979 and earned his B.S. in zoology at Ohio State University in June, 1983. He then attended Southern Illinois University to earn his M.A. in zoology in August, 1985 with advisor Dr. Willard D. Klimstra. His Ph.D. was completed in May, 1991 at University of Kansas where he graduated with honors in Biology studying with advisor Dr. Kenneth B. Armitage. In September 2025, he was honored with an Honorary Doctorate, Doctor Honoris Causa, from the Institute of Biology, Mongolian Academy of Sciences.

== Career ==
While a doctoral and postdoctoral student at the University of Kansas, John began teaching night courses in introductory biology at Kansas City Kansas Community College and also advanced courses in vertebrate biology and evolution at the University of Missouri–Kansas City at Kansas City. This teaching experience and his research on behavior and ecology of tree squirrels permitted John to join the Department of Biology faculty at Willamette University, the oldest university in the American west, in 1992 in Salem, Oregon. John was granted tenure and promoted during his time at Willamette. In 2000, John left Oregon to join the faculty of the wildlife program at the University of Arizona and to serve as the Director of the Mt. Graham Biology Program that includes intensive research on one of the most endangered species in the United States, the Mount Graham Red Squirrel. John was Professor of wildlife science and Director (2017–2020) in the School of Natural Resources and the Environment and a faculty affiliate of the Institute of the Environment until 2020 when he was granted professor emeritus status. In September 2020, he moved to the University of Wyoming as a Wyoming Excellence Chair and Dean of the Haub School of Environment and Natural Resources.

John Koprowski's research extends from his early experience with the behavior and ecology of wildlife in human impacted environments, often using community-based conservation to enhance success. He conducted and published two papers on ground squirrels from undergraduate course projects, obtained both of his graduate degrees focused on the population, behavioral, and evolutionary ecology of tree squirrels, and continues to often work on squirrels as model organisms. His work has focused on the conservation of biodiversity, particularly mammals, and elucidating patterns in social and mating systems as well as the population response of wildlife to stressors in their environment such as non-native species, human development, disease, fire, and climate change.

== Awards ==
- Elected Fellow of the American Association for the Advancement of Science (2018)
- Elected Fellow of the Linnean Society of London (2019)
- Elected Fellow of The Wildlife Society (2016)
- Elected Fellow of the Explorers Club

(2023)

- Doctor Honoris Causa, Institute of Biology, Mongolian Academy of Sciences (2025)
- Aldo Leopold Memorial Award/Aldo Leopold Medal, The Wildlife Society (2022)
- US Department of State, Expert Speaker Program (2024)
- President, American Society of Mammalogists (2025–2027)
- Outstanding Mentor of Graduate and Professional Students, University of Arizona Graduate & Professional Student Council (2011)
- IUCN North American Coordinator-Small Mammals (2010)
- Outstanding Scholarly Publication, School of Natural Resources, University of Arizona (2007, 2002)
- Outstanding Faculty Member, School of Natural Resources (2017, 2013, 2005, 2003)
- Western National Parks Association's Emil W. Haury Award for Outstanding Achievement in Science in the National Park (1999)
- Dorothy Haglund Outstanding Dissertation Award, The Graduate School, University of Kansas (1991)
- Graduate Teaching Assistant of the Year, University of Kansas (1990)

== Family ==
John Koprowski is the eldest son of Judith and Anthony Koprowski, a homemaker and a city laborer, who also raised two younger sons, Jerome and Joseph Koprowski. John married Nancy M Cervenak on 21 September 1985. They have two children, Zachary D Koprowski and Emma I Koprowski.

== Early life ==
John was raised in the west side suburbs of Cleveland, Ohio spending various amounts of time living in apartments in Cleveland, Lakewood, Westlake, and Rocky River before the family settled into a house in Lakewood while he was in the 6th grade. His parents loved fishing and he obtained his passion for the outdoors from the many family fishing trips. He would usually fish for a few hours and then sneaked off to catch turtles, frogs, or salamanders. Squirrels were one of the few species that could be found in an inner, highly urbanized, suburb and became a fascination for the young naturalist; the taxonomic group remained a research interest in his career. He had become fascinated by questions about animal behavior and how animals were able to survive in such challenging environments. Besides biology, John had strong interests in sports, especially baseball, and history; he coauthored a history of the Lakewood, Ohio public school system while a student in Advanced Placement U.S. History at Lakewood High School that was integrated into the curriculum. As a high school student, John was a member of the Latin Club, The Wilderness Society, and the Backpacking and Mountaineering Society that permitted him to combine his interests in science and the outdoors.

== Books ==
- Steele, MA, Koprowski, JL. 2001. North American Tree Squirrels, Smithsonian Institution Press. 224 pp.
- Sanderson, HR, Koprowski, JL. (eds). 2009. The Last Refuge of the Mt. Graham Red Squirrel: Ecology of Endangerment, University of Arizona Press.
- Thorington, RW, Koprowski, JL, Steele, MA, Whatton, J. 2012. Squirrels of the World, Johns Hopkins University Press, 472 pp.
- Jo, YS, Baccus, JT, Koprowski, JL. 2018. Mammals of Korea, National Institute of Biological Sciences, 573 pp.
- Koprowski, JL, Krausman PR. 2019. International Wildlife Management: Conservation Challenges in a Changing World, Johns Hopkins University Press, 248 pp.
- Foerster, TA, Koprowski, JL, Mars, MM. 2024. From Local to Global: Eco-entrepreneurship and Global Engagement with the Environment. Volume 30: Advances in the Study of Entrepreneurship, Innovation and Economic Growth. Emerald Publishing Limited. DOI: https://doi.org/10.1108/S1048-4736202430. ISBN electronic:978-1-83549-276-5. ISBN print:978-1-83549-277-2.

== Representative Publications ==
- Koprowski, J.L. 1993. Alternative reproductive tactics in male eastern gray squirrels: "Making the best of a bad job". Behavioral Ecology 4:165-171.
- Koprowski, J.L. 1992. Removal of copulatory plugs by female tree squirrels. Journal of Mammalogy 73:572-576.
- Koprowski, J.L. 1996. Natal philopatry, communal nesting, and kinship in fox squirrels and eastern gray squirrels. Journal of Mammalogy, 77: 1006–1016.
- Koprowski, J.L. 1998. Conflict between the sexes: a review of social and mating systems of the tree squirrels. pp. 33–41 in M.A. Steele, J.F. Merritt, D.A. Zegers (eds.), Ecology and Evolutionary Biology of Tree Squirrels, Special Publication 6, Virginia Museum of Natural History. 310 pp.
- Koprowski, J.L. 2002. Handling tree squirrels with an efficient and safe restraint. Wildlife Society Bulletin, 30:101-103.
- Koprowski, J.L., M.I. Alanen, A.M. Lynch. 2005. Nowhere to run and nowhere to hide: response of endemic Mt. Graham red squirrels to catastrophic forest damage. Biological Conservation, 127:491-498.
- Koprowski, JL. 2005. The response of tree squirrels to fragmentation: a review and synthesis. Animal Conservation 8: 369–376.
- Koprowski, J.L. 2007. Reproductive strategies and alternative reproductive tactics of tree squirrels. In: Wolff, J. Sherman, P (eds). Rodent Societies: an ecological and evolutionary perspective. Chapter 7: pages 86–95. University of Chicago Press.
- Koprowski, J.L., N. Rajamani. 2008. Global hotspots, centers of diversity, and conservation of the tree and flying squirrels. Current Science 95: 851–856.
- Lurz, P.W.W., J.L. Koprowski, D.J.Wood. 2008. The use of GIS and modelling approaches in squirrel population management and conservation: a review. Current Science 95: 918–922.
- Zugmeyer, C.A., J.L. Koprowski. 2009. Severely insect-damaged forest: A temporary trap for red squirrels? Forest Ecology and Management 257: 464–470.
- Koprowski, J.L., W.S. Fairbanks. 2013. Wildlife behavior. In: Krausman, P.R. Cain, J. (ed.) Wildlife Management: Contemporary Principles and Practices, Johns Hopkins University Press.
- Doumas, S.L., J.L. Koprowski. 2013. Return of fire as a restoration tool: long-term effects of burn severity on habitat use by Mexican fox squirrels. Restoration Ecology 21:133-139.
- Fitak, R., J.L. Koprowski, M. Culver. 2013. Severe reduction in genetic variation in a montane isolate: the endangered Mount Graham red squirrel (Tamiasciurus hudsonicus grahamensis). Conservation Genetics 14:1233-1241.
- Chen, H.L., J.L. Koprowski. 2015. Animal occurrence and space use change in the landscape of anthropogenic noise. Biological Conservation 192: 315–322.
- Posthumus, E.E., J.L. Koprowski, R.S. Steidl. 2015. Red squirrel middens influence abundance but not diversity of other vertebrates. PLoS ONE 10(4): e0123633. doi:10.1371/journal.pone.0123633.
- Derbridge, J.J., J.A. Merkle, M.E. Bucci, P. Callahan, J.L. Koprowski, J.L. Polfus, P.R. Krausman. 2015.Experimentally derived δ^{13}C and δ^{15}N discrimination factors for gray wolves, and the impact of prior information in Bayesian mixing models. PLoS ONE 10(3):e0119940. doi:10.1371/journal.pone.01111940
- Ramos‐Lara, N., J.L. Koprowski. 2015. Spacing behavior of a non‐larder‐hoarding Tamiasciurus: a study of Mearns's squirrels in xeric coniferous forests. Ethology 121:196-205.
- Palmer, R.R., J.L. Koprowski. 2015. How do Neotropical pygmy squirrels (Sciurillus pusillus) use seasonally flooded forests in the Peruvian Amazon? Journal of Mammalogy 96:1295-1304.
- Paudel, S., P. Pal, M.V. Cove, S.R. Jnawali, G. Abel, J.L. Koprowski, R. Ranabhat. 2015. The endangered Ganges River dolphin Platanista gangetica gangetica in Nepal: abundance, habitat and conservation threats. Endangered Species Research 29:59-68.
- Merrick, M.J., J.L. Koprowski. 2016. Evidence of natal habitat preference induction within one habitat type. Proc. Royal Society London B 283:20152106.
- Krishna, M.C, A. Kumar, O.P. Tripathi, J.L. Koprowski. 2016. Diversity, distribution and status of gliding squirrels in protected and non-protected areas of the eastern Himalayas in India. Hystrix, pp. 1–9. doi:10.4404/hystrix-27.2-11688
- Chen, H.L., J.L. Koprowski. 2016. Barrier effects of roads on an endangered forest obligate: impacts of traffic, edge, and gap. Biological Conservation 199:33-40.
- Chen, H.L., J.L. Koprowski. 2016. Differential effects of roads and traffic on space use and movements of native forest-dependent and introduced edge-tolerant species. PLoS ONE 11(1): e0148121.
- Minor, R., J.L. Koprowski. 2016. Seed removal increases through scramble competition with an invasive species. PLoS ONE 10(12): e0143927.
- Kellam, J.O., D.K. Jansen, A.T. Johnson, R.W. Arwood, M.J. Merrick, J.L. Koprowski. 2016. Big Cypress fox squirrel (Sciurus niger avicennia) ecology and habitat use in cypress dome swamp-pine forest mosaic. Journal of Mammalogy 97:200-210.
- Koprowski, J.L., E.A. Goldstein, K.R. Bennett, C. Pereira-Mendes. 2016. The Sciuridae. pp. 648–837, In: Wilson, D., Lacher, T., Mittermeier, R. (eds.) Handbook of Mammals of the World, Volume 6, Lynx Ediciones, Barcelona.
- Koprowski, J.L., K.E. Munroe, A.J. Edelman. 2016. Gray not grey: ecology of eastern gray squirrels in their native range. pp. 1–17. In: Shuttleworth, C., Lurz, P., Gurnell, J. (eds.) Ecology, Conservation & Management of Grey Squirrels in Europe, URI.
- Merrick, M.J., J.L. Koprowski. 2017. Circuit theory to estimate natal dispersal routes and functional landscape connectivity for an endangered small mammal. Landscape Ecology 32:1163–1179.
- Merrick, M.J., J.L. Koprowski. 2017. Should we consider individual behavior differences in applied wildlife conservation studies? Biological Conservation 209:34-44.
- McColgin, M.E., J.L. Koprowski, P.M. Waser. 2017. White-nosed coatis in Arizona: tropical carnivores in a temperate environment. Journal of Mammalogy 98: 64–74.
- Merrick, M.J., J.L. Koprowski. 2017. Altered natal dispersal at the range periphery: the role of behaviour, resources, and maternal condition. Ecology and Evolution 7:58-72.
- Goldstein, E.A., M.J. Merrick, J.L. Koprowski. 2017. Functional semelparity drives population dynamics and endangers a peripheral population. Biological Conservation 205:52-59.
- Brady, M.J., J.L. Koprowski, R.N. Gwinn, Y.S. Jo, K. Young. 2017. Eastern fox squirrel (Sciurus niger, Linnaeus 1758) introduction to the Sonoran Desert. Mammalia 81:221-223.
- Koprowski, J.L. 2017. Introduction. In: González-Maya JF, Galindo-Tarazona R, Urquijo Collazos MM, Zárate Vanegas M & Parra-Romero A (eds). 2017. El Oso Andino en el Macizo de Chingaza. Empresa de Acueducto, Alcantarillado y Aseo de Bogotá D.C. /EAB-ESP, Corporación Autónoma Regional del Guavio - CORPOGUAVIO, Parques Nacionales Naturales de Colombia (Parque Nacional Natural Chingaza, Dirección Territorial Orinoquía) & Proyectos de Conservación de Aguas y Tierras - ProCAT Colombia. Bogotá, D.C. Colombia.
- Koprowski, J.L., K.E. Munroe. 2017. The professional interview: preparing for success. pp. 158–165, In:Henke, S.E., Krausman, P.R. (eds.) Becoming a Wildlife Professional, Johns Hopkins University Press, Baltimore.
- Hale, S.L., J.L. Koprowski. 2018. Ecosystem‐level effects of keystone species reintroduction: a literature review. Restoration Ecology 26:439-445.
- Goldstein, E.A., M.J. Merrick, J.L. Koprowski. 2018. Low survival, high predation pressure present conservation challenges for an endangered endemic forest mammal. Biological Conservation, 221:67-77.
- Jo, Y.-S., J.T. Baccus, J.L. Koprowski. 2018. Mammals of Korea: a review of their taxonomy, distribution and conservation status. Zootaxa 4522:1-216.
- Masoudi, A., U. Bhattarai, J.L. Koprowski, D. Wang. 2018. Elevational distribution and morphological attributes of the entomopathogenic fungi from forests of the Qinling Mountains in China. Applied Microbiology and Biotechnology 102:1483-1499.
- Palmer, RR, Koprowski JL. 2018. Influence of time and flood on diurnal mammal diversity and story level use in Igapó Forest in the Peruvian Amazon. In: Myster RW (ed). 2018. Igapó (Black-water flooded forests) of the Amazon Basin. Springer, Bern, Switzerland.
- Koprowski, JL, JF González-Maya, DA Zárrate-Charry, DA, UR Sharma, C Spencer. 2019. Local approaches and community-based conservation. In: Koprowski, JL, PR Krausman (eds). International Wildlife Management: Conservation Challenges in a Changing World. Johns Hopkins University Press, Baltimore, USA.
- Paudel, S., Koprowski, J.L., 2020. Factors affecting the persistence of endangered Ganges River dolphins (Platanista gangetica gangetica). Ecology and Evolution 10:3138-3148.
- Mazzella, M., Koprowski, J.L., 2020. Response to fire by a forest specialist in isolated montane forest. Forest Ecology and Management, 462:117996.
- Mendes, C.P., Koprowski, J.L., 2020. Does caching strategy vary with microclimate in endangered Mt. Graham red squirrels? PLoS ONE 14: e0224947.
- Hale, S.L., Koprowski, J.L., Archer, S.R., 2020. The reintroduction of a small, native herbivore could limit woody plant proliferation in grasslands. Frontiers in Ecology and Evolution 8:233.doi:10.3389/fevo.2020.00233.
- Mazzamuto, M.V., Merrick, M., Bisi, F., Koprowski, J.L., Wauters, L.A., Martinoli, A., 2020. Timing of resource availability drives divergent social systems and home range dynamics in ecologically similar tree squirrels. Frontiers in Ecology and Evolution 8:174.doi: 10.3389/fevo.2020.00174.
