= Brandon Collier =

American football player (born 1985)

No. 90
- Position: Defensive tackle

Personal information
- Born: September 27, 1985 (age 41); Cleveland, Ohio, U.S.
- Listed height: 6 ft 1 in (1.85 m)
- Listed weight: 278 lb (126 kg)

Career information
- High school: Lakewood (Lakewood, Ohio)
- College: UMass (2005–2009)
- NFL draft: 2010: undrafted

Career history
- Philadelphia Eagles (2011)*; Winnipeg Blue Bombers (2012)
- * Offseason or practice squad member only

Awards and highlights
- 2× Third-team All-CAA (2007, 2009)

Brandon Douglas Collier (born September 27, 1985) is an American former football defensive tackle. He played college football at the University of Massachusetts Amherst, and professionally for the Winnipeg Blue Bombers of the Canadian Football League (CFL).

== Early life ==
Brandon Douglas Collier was born on September 27, 1985, in Cleveland, Ohio. He grew up playing football until he was 11 but did not play the sport again until his senior year at Lakewood High School. He also participated in baseball and track in high school. In 2004, Collier enrolled at the boarding school Western Reserve Academy in Hudson, Ohio. He posted 75 solo tackles, 32 assisted tackles, and 12 sacks during his one year at Western Reserve, earning second-team all-state honors.

== College career ==
Collier received offers from some MAC schools but decided to enroll at the University of Massachusetts Amherst to play for defensive-minded head coach Don Brown. Collier redshirted for the UMass Minutemen in 2005 and was a four-year letterman from 2006 to 2009. He played in all 15 games, starting ten, for the 2006 Minutemen team that lost in the FCS national championship game, recording 52 tackles, three sacks, and one fumble recovery. Collier started all 13 games in 2007, totaling 19 solo tackles, 43 assisted tackles, 4.5 sacks, one forced fumble, and three fumble recoveries while garnering third-team All-Colonial Athletic Association (CAA) recognition. As a junior team captain in 2008, he played in 10 games, starting nine, and posted 36 tackles. He started all 11 games his senior year in 2009, totaling 38 tackles, 3.5 sacks, one forced fumble, and one fumble recovery while earning third-team All-CAA honors. Collier majored in hospitality & tourism management.

== Professional career ==
Collier worked out at UMass's pro day in March 2010. He had a workout with the Carolina Panthers in spring 2010 but it was revealed that he had a pectoral muscle problem requiring surgery. In 2011, he played for the Vienna Vikings in Europe. He signed with the Philadelphia Eagles on August 4, 2011, after the team suffered some injuries at defensive tackle. Collier was released on August 13, 2011.

Collier signed with the Winnipeg Blue Bombers of the Canadian Football League (CFL) on April 4, 2012. He played in ten games, all starts, for the Blue Bombers during the 2012 season, recording 12 tackles, two sacks, one forced fumble, and one pass breakup. He was released on April 9, 2013.

Collier then returned to Europe and played three more seasons. In August 2016, he suffered a career-ending ACL injury.

== Recruiting career ==
In 2017, Collier founded PPI Recruits to match European players with U.S. college football teams. As of March 2023, he had helped over 100 recruits from over 20 countries secure Division I scholarships. In 2023, he was named No. 5 on Sports Illustrated’s "20 Most Influential Black Figures in College Football". Collier has also recruited some players from Africa and Australia.
