= 1908–09 Michigan Wolverines men's basketball team =

American college basketball season

1908–09 Michigan Wolverines men's basketball
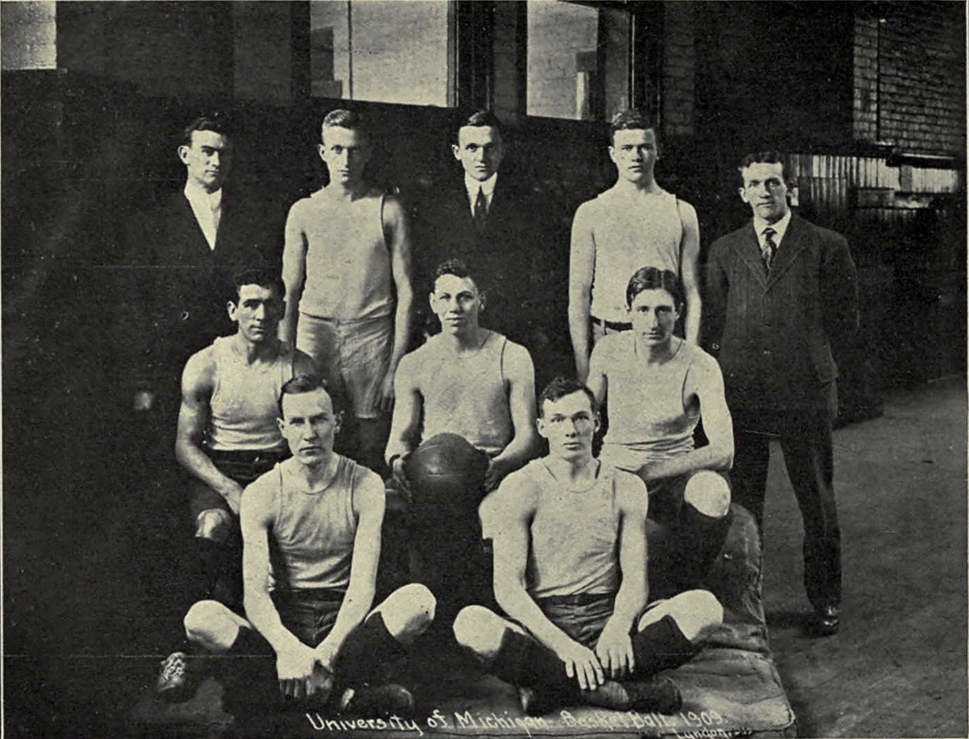
- 1908–09 Michigan basketball team; back row (l to r): coach G. D. Corneal, unidentified, mgr. Ralph Sayles, J. Griffith Hays, trainer George A. May; middle row (l to r): Gregory Peck, captain Joseph P. Wilson, unknown; front row (l to r): Carl Raiss, unknown
- Conference: Independent
- Record: 1–4
- Head coach: George Corneal
- Captain: J. P. Wilson
- Home arena: Waterman Gymnasium

The 1908–09 Michigan Wolverines men's basketball team represented the University of Michigan in intercollegiate basketball during the 1908–09 season. The team played its home games at Waterman Gymnasium and compiled a record of 1–4. The team won Michigan's first intercollegiate basketball game, and played in its first overtime game, defeating Oberlin College, 27–25, on January 16, 1909. Carl Raiss won the game in overtime with "a difficult goal from the middle of the field." At the end of the season, basketball was discontinued at Michigan for the next eight years. Although the 1908–09 team played only two home games, low attendance and poor conditions at Waterman Gymnasium were cited as the reasons for terminating the basketball program.

George Corneal, at age 25, served as Michigan's first basketball coach during the 1908–09 season. Corneal had been hired in 1907 as the assistant in physical training at Waterman Gymnasium. He spent only one year at Michigan and later served for 33 years as a football, track, and basketball in Wisconsin. Joseph Wilson was the team captain. Henry H. Farquhar was the team's leading scorer with 48 points (12 field goals and 24 free throws) and average of 9.6 points per game.

== Schedule ==
Date	Opponent	Score	Result	Location
January 9, 1909	Michigan Agricultural College	24–16	Loss	Michigan State University Armory, Lansing, MI
January 16, 1909	Oberlin College	27–25	Win	Waterman Gymnasium, Ann Arbor, MI
February 20, 1909	Michigan Agricultural College	45–25	Loss	Michigan State University Armory, Lansing, MI
February 27, 1909	Ohio State	29–22	Loss	Ohio State Armory, Columbus, OH
March 6, 1909	Ohio State	42–26	Loss	Waterman Gymnasium, Ann Arbor, MI

== Pre-season ==
In its January 1909 issue, The Michigan Alumnus announced: "For the first time in the history of the University there is to be a varsity basketball team. Realizing the demand for an indoor winter sport and the presence of good material in college, the athletic authorities passed a resolution providing for a basketball team and granted them a schedule of seven or eight games for the season." The Alumnus observed that basketball had become "almost a major sport" in many leading colleges, and its recognition as a varsity sport at Michigan was "greeted with approval by students and alumni alike."

Head coach George Corneal had difficulty finding players who were eligible for the team. Stanley Cox was "easily the best known basketball man" at Michigan, and he had been recruited by several big eastern colleges. However, Cox was ruled academically ineligible to play.

== Game summaries ==
=== At Michigan Agricultural College ===
Michigan's first intercollegiate basketball game was played on Saturday, January 9, 1909, against Michigan Agricultural College at "the local gym" in Lansing. The Aggies won the game, 24-16. The Michigan Alumnus wrote that the loss was due to Michigan's "inability to locate the basket." The Wolverines scored only four goals from the field, one each by H. H. Farquhar, F. C. Wilson, Raiss, and Ely. Farquhar scored ten of Michigan's 16 points on one goal from field and eight goals from foul. Michigan's starting lineup in the opening game was Farquhar (left forward), Wilson (right forward), Raiss (center), Peck (left guard), and Ely (right guard).

=== Oberlin ===
Michigan won its first intercollegiate basketball game, and played in its first overtime game, on Saturday, January 16, 1909, against Oberlin College. The game was played at the Waterman Gymnasium on the Michigan campus, and Michigan won by a score of 27 to 25. The game was tied at the end of each 20-minute half, and the teams decided to play an extra five minutes. Raiss won the game in overtime with "a difficult goal from the middle of the field." Raiss was Michigan's high scorer with 10 points on five field goals. Lathers added six points on three field goals, and Farquhar had seven points on two field goals and three free throws. Team captain Wilson added four points on two field goals. Michigan's starting lineup against Oberlin was Raiss (right forward), Farquhar (left forward), Lathers (center), Wilson (right guard and captain), and Peck (left guard).

=== At Michigan Agricultural ===
On February 20, 1909, Michigan played its second road game, traveling to Lansing, Michigan for a rematch against Michigan Agricultural College. The Aggies defeated the Wolverines, 45 to 25. The Michigan Alumnus noted that the game was "replete with fouls" and was "about the roughest contest imaginable." The Alumnus added that Michigan "showed a decided lack of teamwork and was much too slow for the speedy Lansing players."

=== At Ohio State ===
On Saturday, February 27, 1909, the team played its first game outside the State of Michigan. The Wolverines traveled to Columbus, Ohio, where they lost to Ohio State, 29 to 22. Michigan trailed by only one point at halftime. Team captain Wilson fouled out of the game after committing five fouls, and he was replaced by Peck. Michigan's leading scorer in the game was West with 12 points on four field goals and four free throws.

=== Ohio State ===
Michigan concluded its season on March 6, 1909, with a 42-24 loss to Ohio State in Ann Arbor. Michigan had led at halftime by a score of 16 to 14, but Ohio State outscored the Wolverines, 28 to 8, in the second half. The Michigan Alumnus attributed the poor performance in the second half to "fast playing by the Buckeyes and the introduction of two substitutes not in the best of condition." Farquhar was Michigan's leading scorer with 16 points on four field goals and eight free throws. West and Lathers added four points each (two field goals each), and Wilson had two points on one field goal. Michigan's lineup in the game was Farquhar (left forward), West (right forward), Lathers and Raiss (center), Wilson and Cox (right forward), and Hayes (right guard).

== Post-season ==
At the end of the 1909 season, the members of the team elected J. Griffith Hayes as the captain of the 1909-10 team. Hayes played guard on the 1909 team and was described by The Michigan Alumnus as "a hard worker and a star at the game."

== Players ==
- Stanley C. Cox, Holyoke, Massachusetts - forward
- Glenn M. Ely, Fort Dodge, Iowa - guard
- Henry Hallowell Farquhar, Rockville, Maryland - forward
- J. Griffith Hayes, Circleville, Ohio - guard
- Charles T. "Chick" Lathers, Dearborn, Michigan - center
- Gregory Pearl Peck, San Diego, California - guard
- Carl F. Raiss, Jr., Detroit, Michigan - center and forward
- Frank C. West, Fredonia, New York - forward
- Joseph P. Wilson, Newton, Pennsylvania - team captain, guard, and forward

== Scoring statistics ==
Player	Games	Field goals	Free throws	Points	Points per game
Henry Farquhar	5	12	24	48	9.6
Frank West	5	8	4	20	4.0
Charles Lathers	5	8	0	16	3.2
Joseph Wilson	5	6	0	12	2.4
Carl Raiss	5	6	0	12	2.4
J. Griffith Hayes	3	3	0	6	2.0
Glenn Ely	2	1	0	2	1.0
Total	5	44	28	116	23.2

== Coaching staff ==
- George Corneal - coach
- Ralph Thomas Sayles, Owosso, Michigan - manager
