= Lakewood High School (Lakewood, Ohio) =

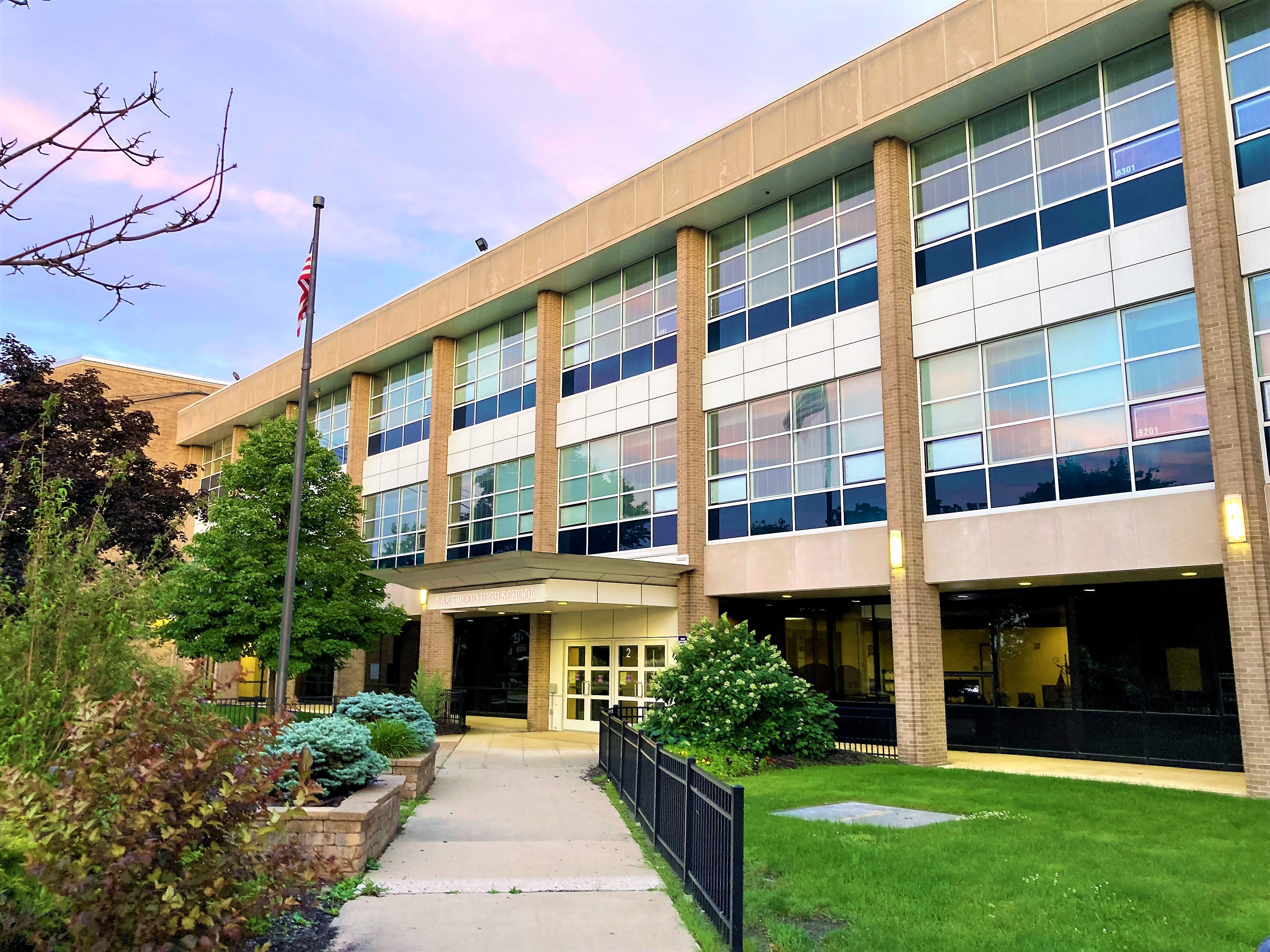

Location
- 14100 Franklin Boulevard; Lakewood, Ohio 44107; United States; 41°28′50″N 81°47′26″W

Information
- Type: Public
- Motto: "Carpe Diem"
- School district: Lakewood City School District
- Principal: Joy Morgan
- Staff: 81.50 (FTE)
- Grades: 9–12
- Enrollment: 1,414 (2023-2024)
- Student to teacher ratio: 17.35
- Colors: Purple and Gold
- Athletics conference: Cleveland West Conference
- Team name: Rangers
- Rival: Rocky River High School
- Newspaper: Lakewood Times
- Website: www.lakewoodcityschools.org

Lakewood High School is a public high school located in Lakewood, Ohio, west of Cleveland. The school is part of the Lakewood City School District. The school colors are purple and gold and the mascot is the Ranger Man. The school athletics program is currently a member of the Cleveland West Conference.

== Athletics ==
Lakewood is currently a member of the Cleveland West Conference

- Boys:
  - Fall: Football (V-JV-FR), Cross Country (V-JV), Soccer (V-JV), Golf (V).
  - Winter: Basketball (V-JV-FR), Hockey (V), Swimming (V), Wrestling (V), Indoor Track (V), Bowling (V).
  - Spring: Baseball (V-JV-FR), Tennis (V), Track (V).
- Girls:
  - Fall: Volleyball (V-JV-FR), Cross Country (V-JV), Soccer (V-JV), Tennis (V-JV).
  - Winter: Basketball (V-JV-FR), Swimming (V), Gymnastics (V), Indoor Track (V), Bowling (V), Wrestling (V).
  - Spring: Softball (V-JV), Track (V).

(Key: V: Varsity, JV: Junior Varsity, FR: Freshmen)

=== State championships ===
- Boys Cross Country - 1928, 1929, 1932, 1953
- Boys Swimming – 1928, 1929, 1962
- Boys Track and Field - 1922, 1923, 1924, 1926, 1931
- Boys Wrestling - 1948
- Girls Gymnastics - 1979

=== First Federal Lakewood Stadium ===
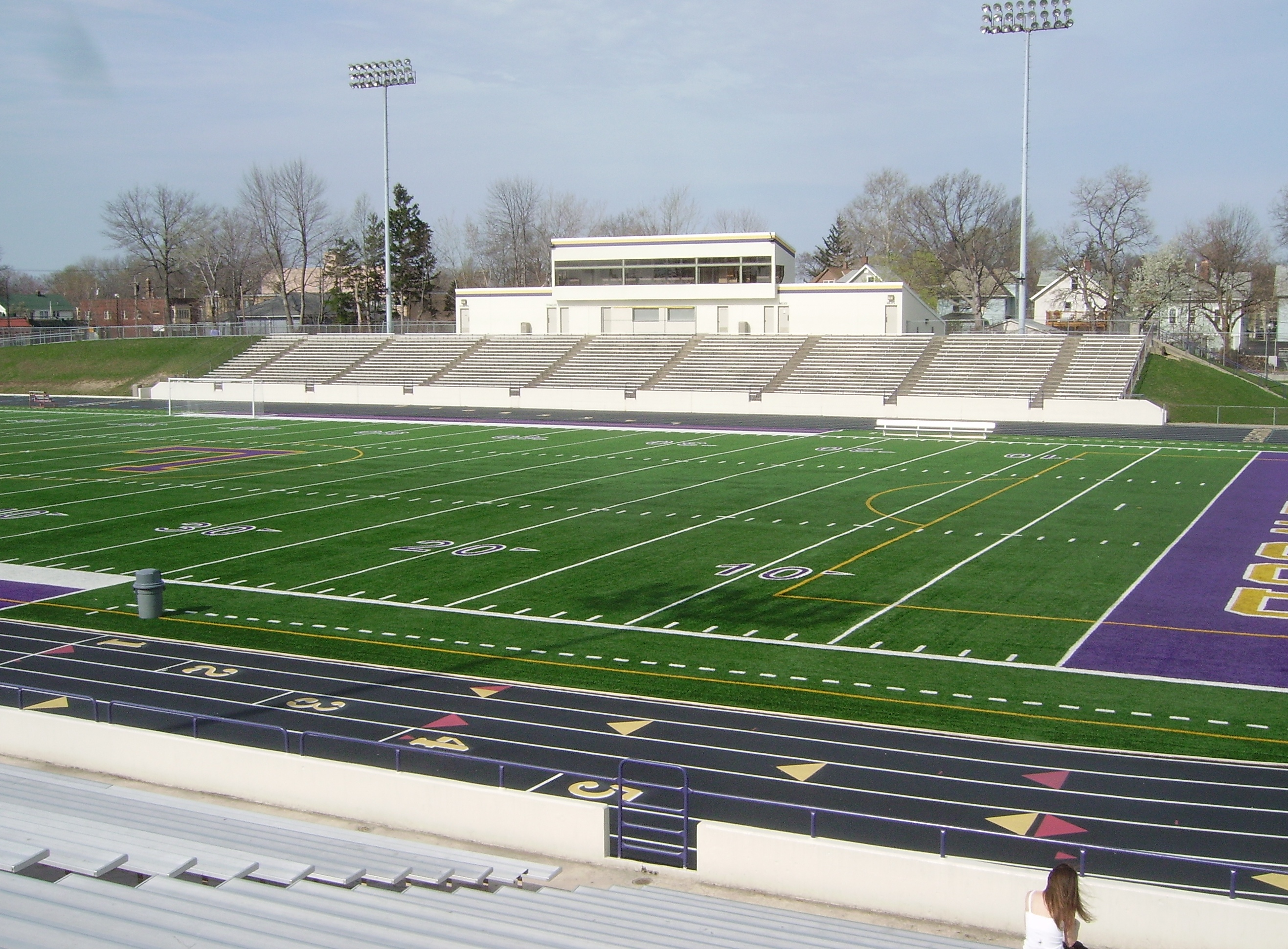
LHS Stadium

Lakewood High School's athletic field was built in 1941 and is located just south of the school building in the school's athletic complex. The stadium is used for numerous sporting events, including playoff and home football games for nearby St. Edward High School football team, which is located a few blocks away. The football field was first renovated in 1986-7, with the addition of an all-weather track and a sand-ballasted synthetic surface, and again, in 2007 with the installation of FieldTurf and in 2014, First Federal of Lakewood, a local bank, agreed to pay the district $320,000 for the naming rights. In 2024, a jumbotron replaced the original scoreboard. It can seat 8,000 people with standing room for an additional 2,000.

The athletic complex is also home to the school's football, soccer, rugby, track & field, tennis, softball, and baseball teams.

== Performing arts ==
Lakewood High School has a number of opportunities for its students to gain experience and training in the performing arts. Multiple orchestras and choirs are offered as well as broadcast/theater production.

=== Barnstormers ===
With production history dating back to the 1940s, Lakewood High School's Barnstormers Drama Club is one of the oldest high school theatre clubs in the state. The club performs three shows per year: A Fall play, The Winter One-Acts Play Festival, and a Spring musical.

Under its current advisor, the club has seen such productions as "Rodger and Hammerstein's Cinderella," "The 25th Annual Putnam County Spelling Bee," "Into The Woods," "Little Women," "1776," and in 2019 performed "Mamma Mia!".

=== The Lakewood Electric Orchestra (Formerly Lakewood Project) ===
The Lakewood Electric Orchestra's Logo

The Lakewood Electric Orchestra, founded in 2002, is an alternative rock orchestra consisting of Lakewood High School students. The Lakewood Electric Orchestra has performed around the country as far as Utah and Texas.

=== Marching band ===
The marching band consisted of over 100 musicians and auxiliaries, which are made up of the dance team (the "Rangerettes") and the flag corps. Major events the marching band have been invited to include the 2000 BCS National Championship Game in Louisiana and the 2003 Outback Bowl in Florida. The marching band has also performed in the 2016 Toronto Thanksgiving Day Parade, and visited Walt Disney World Orlando, Fl in November, 2021.

Every year, the Ranger Marching Band has an annual festival, bringing marching bands from around the state. Lakewood has invited both high school and college marching bands to Lakewood First Federal Stadium.

== Notable alumni ==
View of former Lakewood High School Building Located at 1470 Warren Rd.

- Bill Bonness (1942) – professional baseball player
- Jack Buck (1942) - sportscaster and member of the Baseball Hall of Fame
- Dick Celeste (1955) - Governor of Ohio (1983–1991)
- Neil W. Chamberlain (1933) – Economist and industrial relations scholar
- Brandon Collier (2004) – Professional football player
- David Conte (1973) - Composer
- Donald Erb - Composer
- Summer Erb (1995) - Professional basketball player in the Women's National Basketball Association (2000–02), 11th overall pick in the 2000 WNBA draft
- Richard Graber - Former U.S. Ambassador to the Czech Republic
- Clark Graebner (1961) - professional tennis player
- Donald Henderson (1928) - headed the international effort during the 1960s to eradicate smallpox
- Dee Hoty - Actress
- John L. Koprowski (1979) - Conservation biologist, squirrel expert
- Bo Koster - Keyboard player for My Morning Jacket
- Tonia Kwiatkowski - figure skater
- Cliff Lewis - Professional football player in the NFL
- Dave Malloy (1994) - Musical Theatre composer and Tony Award Nominee for Best Musical, Best Orchestrations, Best Book of a Musical, and Best Original Score in 2017 for his musical “Natasha, Pierre and the Great Comet of 1812”
- Robert J. Meder (1935) - World War II Doolittle Raider
- John Morton (1971) - founder, lead musician of the Electric Eels
- Darlington Nagbe - Professional soccer player in Major League Soccer
- John O'Brien (1978) - Novelist
- Parker Pennington (2003) - figure skater
- Albert Porter (1922) - Cleveland politician
- Jane Scott (1937) - rock music critic

== Notable faculty ==
- George Corneal, (1917-1935 Football coach, 1917-1944 track coach)
- Robert Cutietta, composer, music psychologist
