= William G. Farrow =

United States Army Air Forces officer

William Glover Farrow
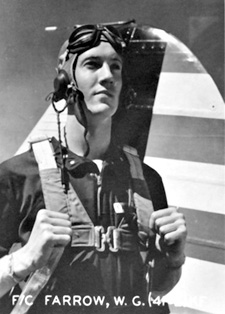
- William Farrow in uniform
- Born: September 24, 1918; Darlington, South Carolina, U.S.
- Died: October 15, 1942 (aged 24); Shanghai, Japanese-occupied China
- Cause of death: Execution by firing squad
- Burial place: Arlington National Cemetery
- Military career
- Allegiance: United States of America
- Branch: United States Army Air Corps; United States Army Air Forces
- Service years: 1940–1942
- Rank: First Lieutenant
- Nickname: Bill
- Units: 34th Bomb Squadron; 17th Bomb Group
- Conflicts: World War II • Doolittle Raid
- Awards: Distinguished Flying Cross; Purple Heart

William Glover Farrow (September 24, 1918 – October 15, 1942) was a lieutenant in the United States Army Air Forces who participated in the Doolittle Raid. In February 1942, he volunteered to participate in the raid, which took place on April 18 that year. Farrow was captured by the Japanese after the completion of his bombing mission. He was tried, and along with two other crew members, sentenced to death and executed by firing squad. His ashes were recovered and interred in the Arlington National Cemetery in 1946, and he posthumously received multiple awards.

== Early life ==
William Farrow was born in Darlington, South Carolina, on September 24, 1918. His father Isaac was employed at a cigarette company in Raleigh, North Carolina; his mother Jessie, born in 1897, was the daughter of a wealthy tobacco warehouse owner. At age sixteen, William became an Eagle Scout. He graduated from St. John's High School in May 1935, and went on to attend the University of South Carolina.

== Military career ==
During the fall of 1939, he received his pilot training at the Hawthorne School of Aeronautics in Orangeburg, South Carolina. On November 23, 1940, Farrow joined the United States Army Air Corps' Aviation Cadet Program. He joined the Air Corps training program in November 1940, and was commissioned in July 1941.

In July of the following year, he obtained his aviator badge and a commission as a second lieutenant at Kelly Field in Texas. Following his completion of the B-25 Mitchell training program, he was sent to Pendleton Field in Oregon as a member of the 34th Bomb Squadron.

=== Doolittle Raid ===
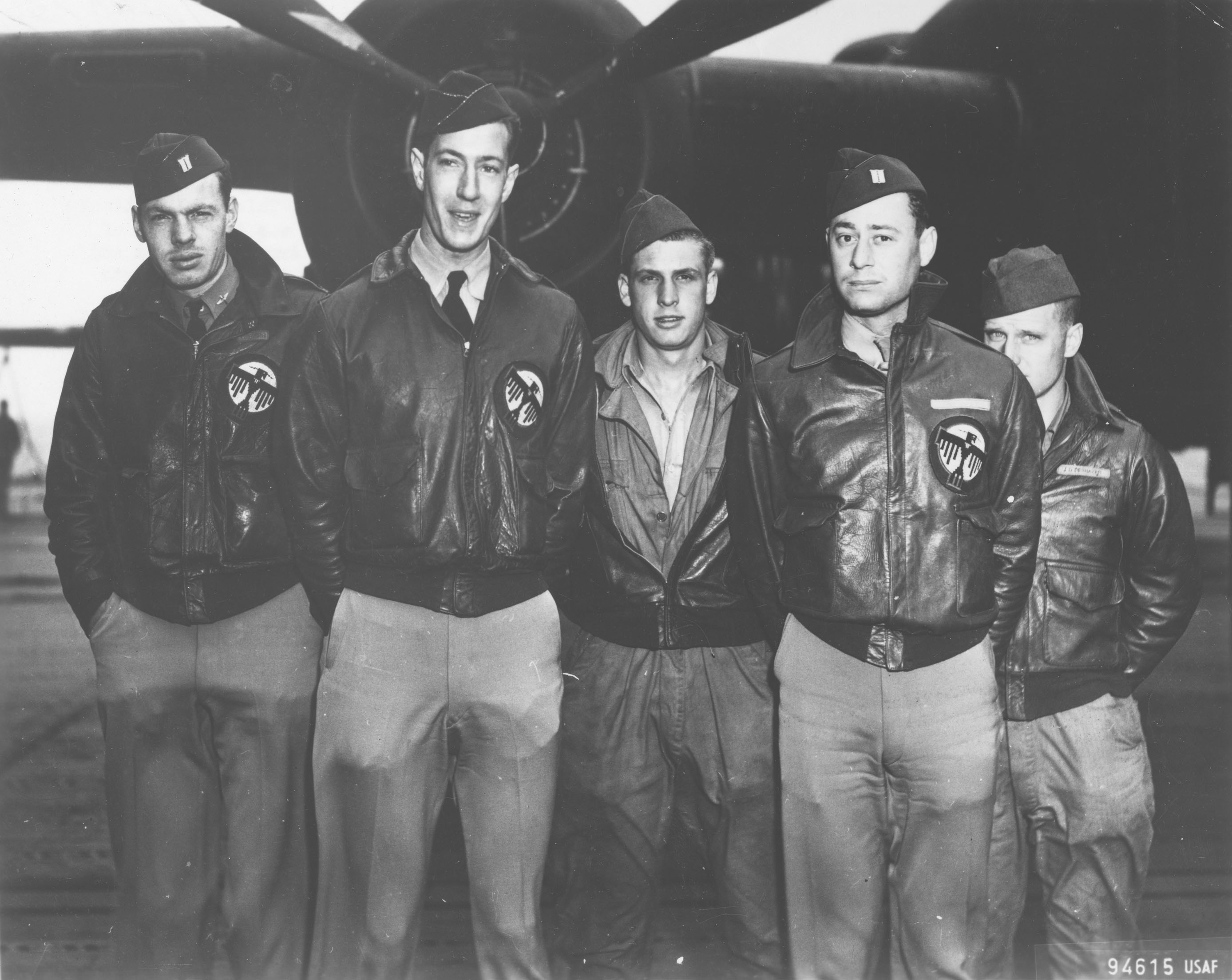
The crew of the Bat Out of Hell (crew #16) just before take off for the Doolittle Raid on USS Hornet (CV-8), 18 April 1942. (Left to right) Lt. George Barr (navigator), Lt. William G. Farrow (pilot), Sgt. Harold A. Spatz (engineer-gunner), Lt. Robert L. Hite (co-pilot) and Sgt. Jacob DeShazer (bombardier)

In February 1942, following the squadron's transfer to Columbia Army Air Base in January, Farrow volunteered to participate in the Doolittle Raid, an attempt to retaliate against the Japanese as a result of their attack on Pearl Harbor. At the time, however, the mission was secret and its target unknown to the volunteers. On April 1, 1942, after training in various places around the United States, the crews and their respective aircraft departed from San Francisco aboard the USS Hornet (CV-8). The mission took place on April 18. The B-25 which Farrow piloted, named Bat out of Hell, was the sixteenth and final aircraft to depart from the Hornet. After the aircraft's targets in Nagoya, which included an oil tank and aircraft factory, had been bombed, Farrow intended to land in Quzhou. However, the Japanese had deactivated the beacon that Farrow was using for direction.

=== Capture and death ===
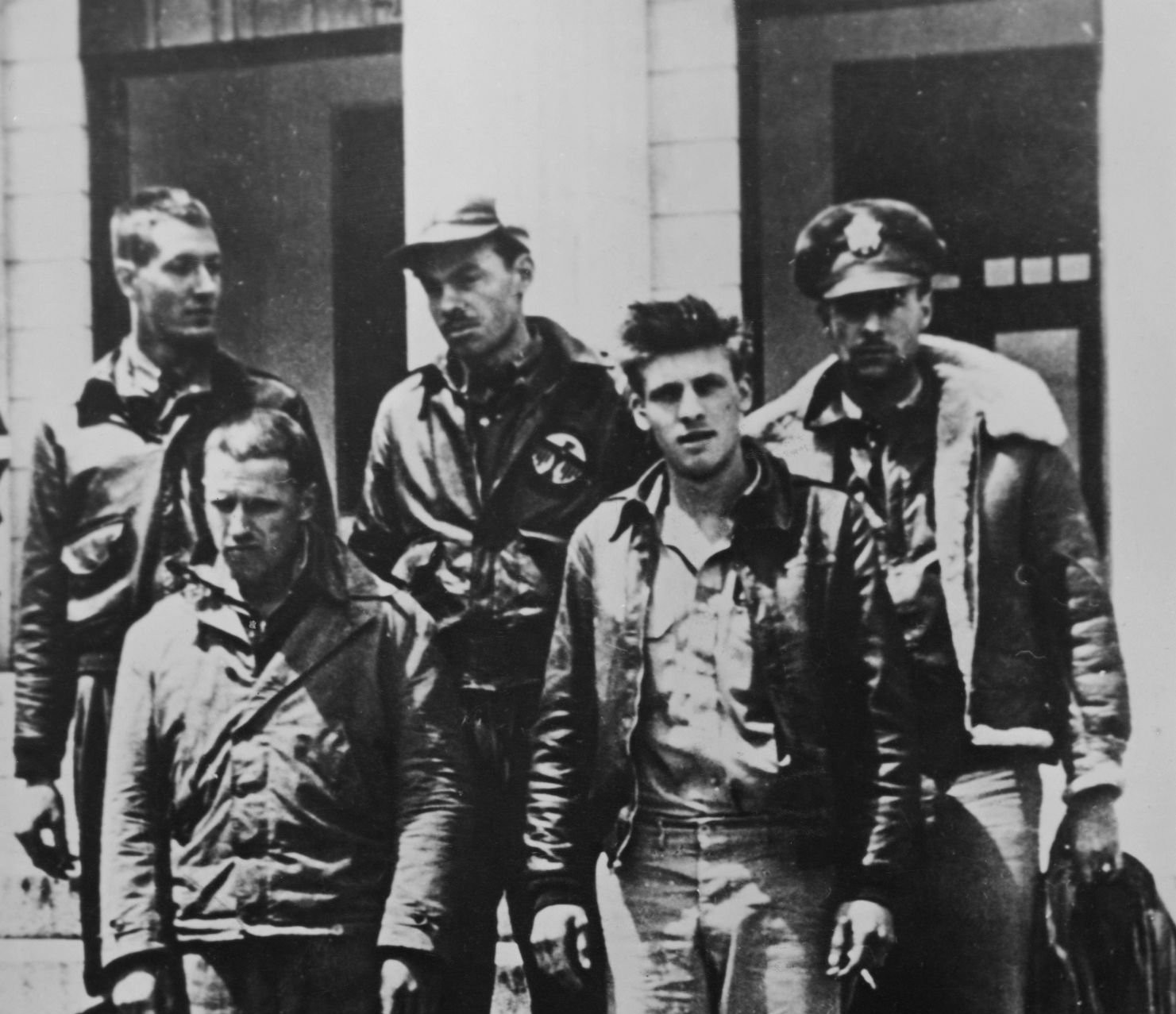
Farrow (top left) with his bomber crew following their capture by the Japanese (20 April 1942)

The Imperial Japanese Forces were desperately searching for the whereabouts of the raid's 16th aircraft. Sixteen hours after departure from the Hornet, the aircraft's fuel exhausted, Farrow and his crew bailed out near Japanese-controlled Nanchang, China. The Japanese captured Farrow and all members of his crew, and subjected them to imprisonment, interrogation, and torture. He was sentenced to death for machine-gunning civilians. Most of the crew members' sentences were commuted to life imprisonment by the Emperor of Japan, but the sentences of three men, including Farrow, stood. The night before their execution, the men were permitted to write final letters. The International Red Cross was to mail the letters after receiving them from the Japanese. The Japanese, however, did not pass on the letters, and they were never mailed. Farrow wrote letters to his mother and to a friend, Lt. Ivan Ferguson. In the letter addressed to his mother, Farrow wrote:

You have given much, so much more to me than I have returned, but such is the Christian way. You are and always will be a real angel. Be brave and strong for my sake. I love you, Mom, from the depths of a full heart... Don't let this get you down. Just remember God will make everything right and that I'll see you all again in the hereafter... So let me implore you to keep your chin up. Be brave and strong for my sake. P.S. My insurance policy is in my bag in a small tent in Columbia. Read Thanatopsis by Bryant if you want to know how I am taking this. My faith in God is complete, so I am unafraid.

At dawn on October 15, the men were taken to a public cemetery near Shanghai, where they were shot by a Japanese firing squad. Following the bodies' cremation, the ashes were taken to a mortuary. After the war ended, the men's ashes were recovered and their letters found in a secret file of the War Ministry Building in Tokyo. In 1946, Farrow was interred with honors at the Arlington National Cemetery, Section 12, Grave 157.

== Honors ==

Army Air Forces Pilot Badge
Distinguished Flying Cross	Purple Heart	Prisoner of War Medal
American Defence Service Medal	American Campaign Medal	Asiatic-Pacific Campaign Medal w/ 1 bronze campaign star
World War II Victory Medal	Order of the Sacred Tripod; Republic of China	China War Memorial Medal; Republic of China

Farrow was posthumously given multiple awards. These included the Order of the Sacred Tripod (寶鼎勳章) of the Republic of China, the Distinguished Flying Cross, and the Purple Heart. He was also awarded the Prisoner of War Medal, which, by authorization of Congress in 1985, was given to all members of the United States Armed Forces who had been a prisoner of war after April 5, 1917.

He is the namesake of the Arnold Air Society’s William Glover Farrow Squadron hosted by AFROTC Detachment 775 at USC. In 2013, he was posthumously inducted into the South Carolina Hall of Fame.
