= George Corneal =

American basketball, track and football coach

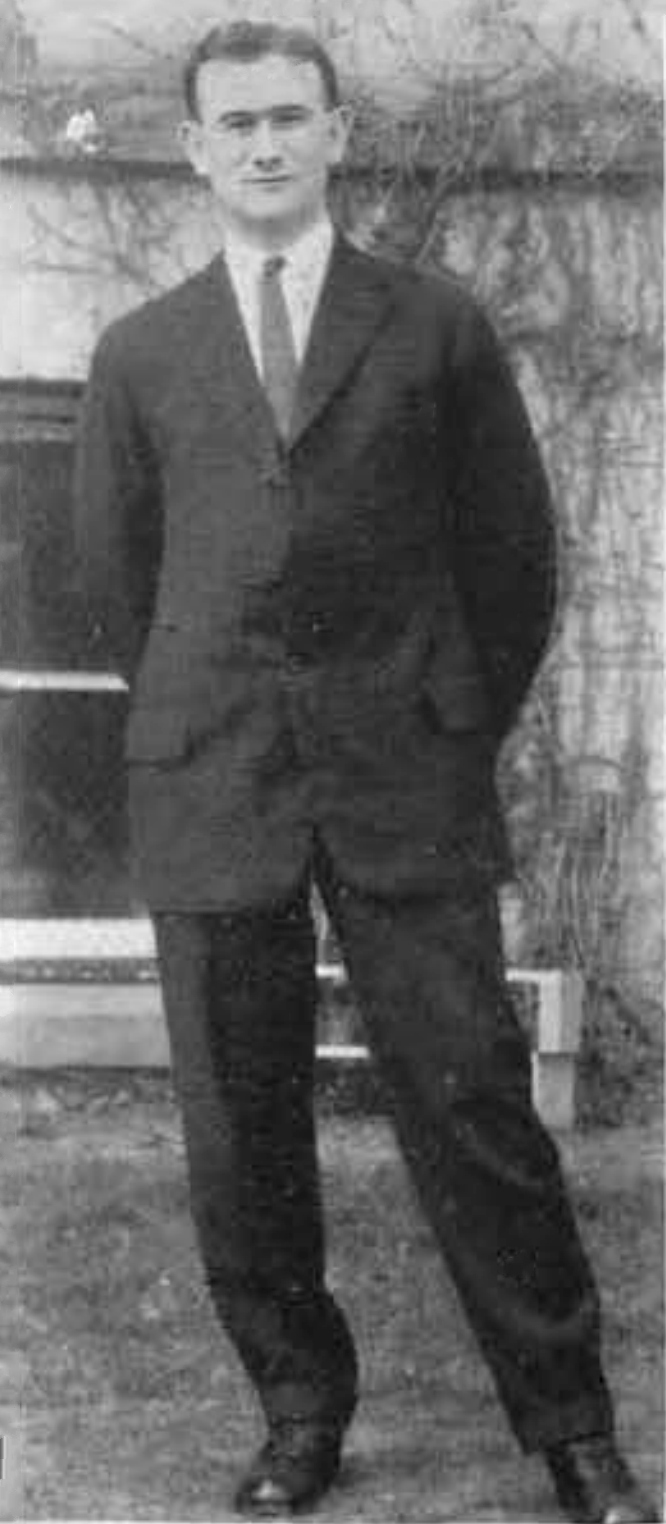
- Corneal in 1915

Biographical details
- Born: September 13, 1883; Philadelphia, Pennsylvania, U.S.
- Died: December 28, 1944 (aged 61); Cleveland, Ohio, U.S.

Coaching career (HC unless noted)

Football
- 1914–1916: Stevens Point
- 1917–1934: Lakewood HS (OH)

Basketball
- 1909: Michigan
- 1911–1914: Rock Island HS (IL)
- 1914–1917: Stevens Point
- 1917–?: Lakewood HS (OH)

Track
- ?: Brown Preparatory School
- ?: Chicago
- 1907: Ohio State
- 1910: Boise Normal School
- 1917–1944: Lakewood HS (OH)

Head coaching record
- Overall: 14–7 (college football); 23–16 (college basketball)

George Durkin Corneal (September 13, 1883 – December 28, 1944) was an American basketball, track and football coach. In 1909, he became the first basketball coach at the University of Michigan and led the Michigan Wolverines basketball team to a 1–4 record. He also coached football, track, and basketball at the University of Wisconsin–Stevens Point and Lakewood High School.

== Early years ==
Corneal was born in Philadelphia in 1883. He graduated from Temple University and attended the University of Pennsylvania and Yale University where he studied under legendary track trainer and coach Mike Murphy. His early coaching jobs included coaching track and field at the Brown Preparatory School in Philadelphia and the University of Chicago, before moving to Ohio State University in 1907.

== University of Michigan ==
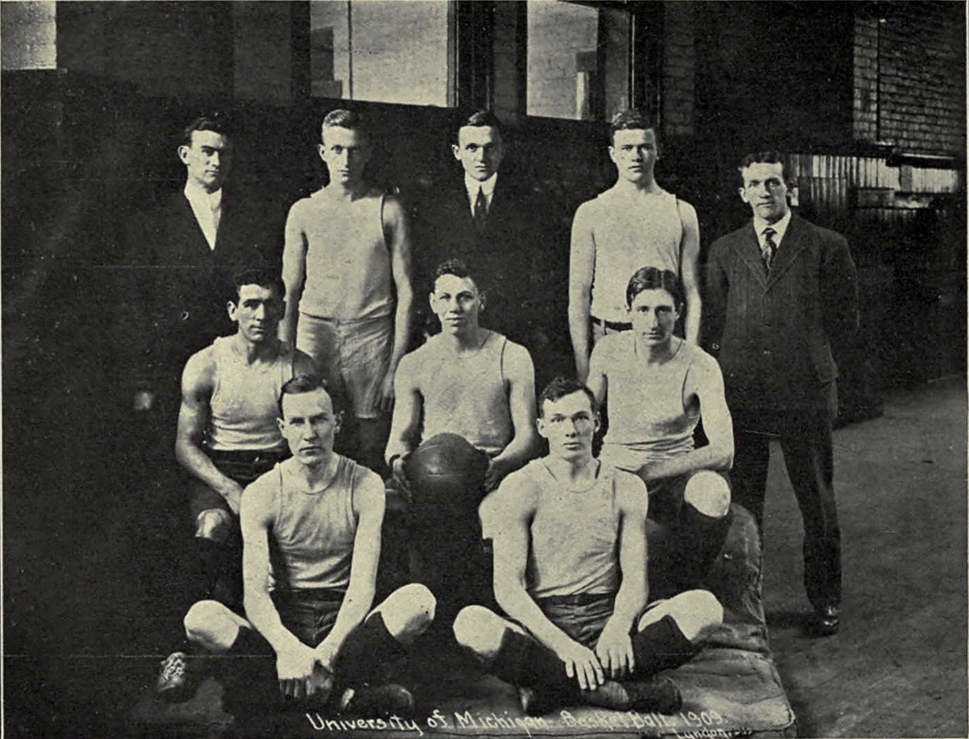
1909 Michigan Wolverines basketball team coached by Corneal, who is standing on the left.

In the fall of 1907, he was hired as the assistant in physical training at the University of Michigan's Waterman Gymnasium. While at Michigan, he also served as the coach of the school's first varsity basketball team in 1909. The Michigan Alumnus announced the formation of the team in January 1909:

"For the first time in the history of the University there is to be a varsity basketball team. Realizing the demand for an indoor winter sport and the presence of good material in college, the athletic authorities passed a resolution providing for a basketball team and granted them a schedule of seven or eight games for this season. Coach Corneal finds himself up against the same proposition that always faces Coach Yost and Keene Fitzpatrick. His best men are ineligible and his 'reserves' consequently give his varsity a drubbing almost every evening when they line up in practice games. ... However, the coach is working hard and admits that he expects to have a good team rounded out by the time the first game is played with M.A.C."

The Michigan team compiled a record of 1–4 under Corneal.

== Boise and Rock Island ==
After leaving Michigan, Corneal coached for a time at the Normal School in Boise, Idaho. At the time of the 1910 Census, Corneal was living in Boise and identified his occupation as a school teacher.

From 1911 to 1914, Corneal was the basketball coach at Rock Island High School in Rock Island, Illinois. In three seasons at Rock Island, Corneal's teams compiled a record of 19–18.

== Stevens Point ==
For three academic years from 1914 to 1917, Corneal was the athletic director and head basketball, track and football coach at the Stevens Point State Normal School, now known as the University of Wisconsin–Stevens Point. In three years at Stevens Point, Corneal's basketball teams compiled a record of 22–12, including an 11–2 record during the 1916–17 season. In September 1917, when Corneal accepted a position in Ohio, the move was front page news in Stevens Point. The Stevens Point Daily Journal wrote:

"He came here three years ago and conducted the Normal athletics in a successful manner. Stevens Point under him has had football teams which each year made a bid for the conference championship. He has also had charge of the physical work among the boys. His loss will be a serious one here ..."

== Lakewood High School ==
In September 1917, Corneal moved from Stevens Point, Wisconsin to Lakewood, Ohio. He was hired as the athletic director, football coach, basketball coach and track coach at Lakewood High School. Corneal stepped down as the school's football coach in 1935, but he remained the track for 27 years from coach from 1917 to 1944. He was also the cross country coach from 1928 through 1943. In his obituary, the Associated Press noted that "Corneal was famed for his powerful cinder path teams which dominated northern Ohio track circles for many years." His teams won five Ohio state track titles and three Ohio state cross country titles. He coached 51 individual state track meet winners and one state cross country meet winner. Several of his teams won national honors, and his athletes broke the world schoolboy record for the mile relay in 1925, the world schoolboy medley record in 1929, and the national two mile relay record in 1930. During his tenure at Lakewood, Corneal also founded the Lakewood Relays in 1922 and served as the meet's director.

Corneal has been inducted into the Lakewood Hall of Fame. He also served as the vice president of the Ohio Association of Track Coaches, and was posthumously inducted into that organization's Hall of Fame as part of its inaugural class in 1969.

== Family and death ==
In July 1912, Corneal married Rachel V. Abott at Bon Homme County, South Dakota. They had a son, George A. Corneal, born in approximately 1916 in Wisconsin.

Corneal died in 1944 following an illness of several months.

== Head coaching record ==
=== College football ===
Year	Team	Overall	Conference	Standing	Bowl/playoffs
Stevens Point Pointers (Inter-Normal Athletic Conference of Wisconsin) (1914–1916)
1914	Stevens Point	6–2	2–2	T–5th	
1915	Stevens Point	4–2	1–2	T–5th	
1916	Stevens Point	4–3	2–1	T–3rd	
Stevens Point:		14–7	5–5		
Total:		14–7			
