= China War Memorial Medal =

Republic of China award

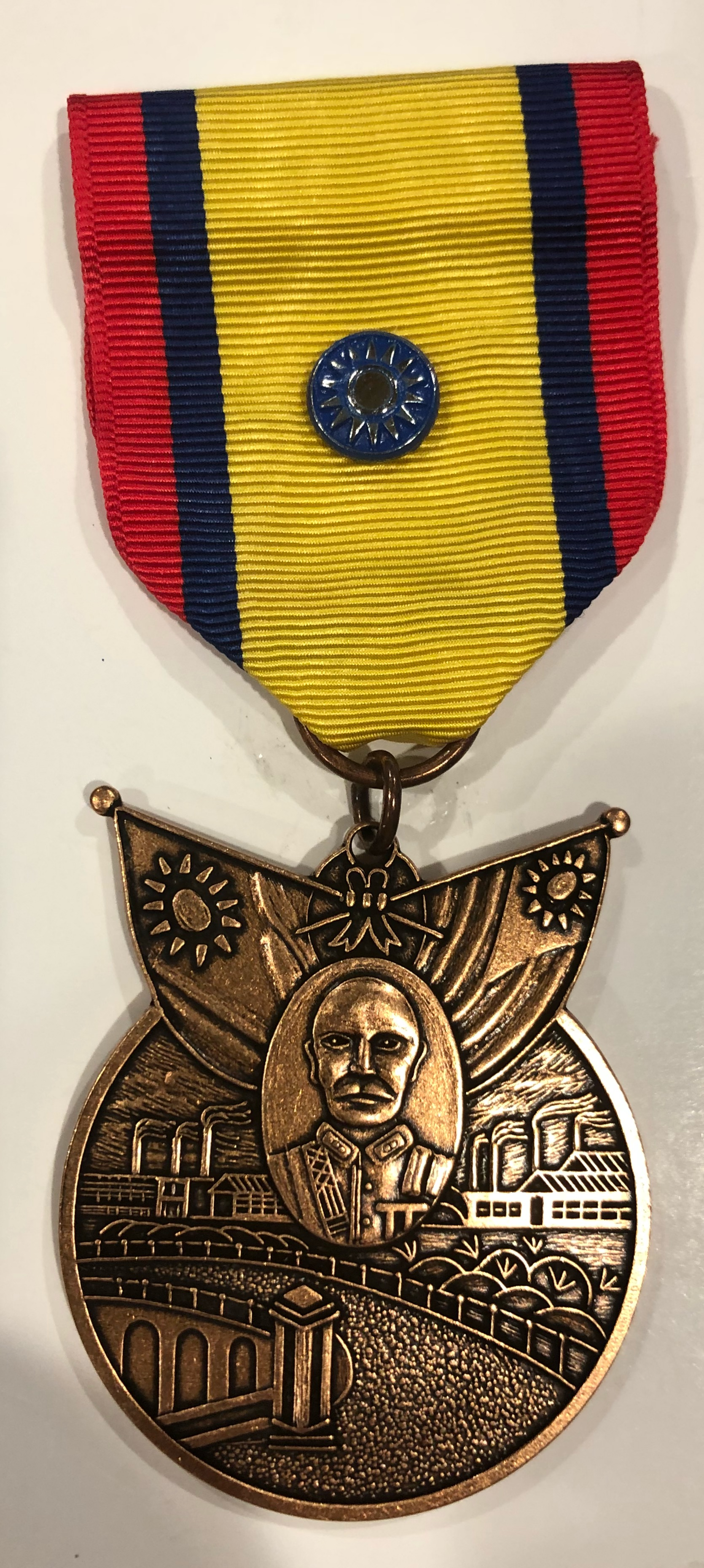
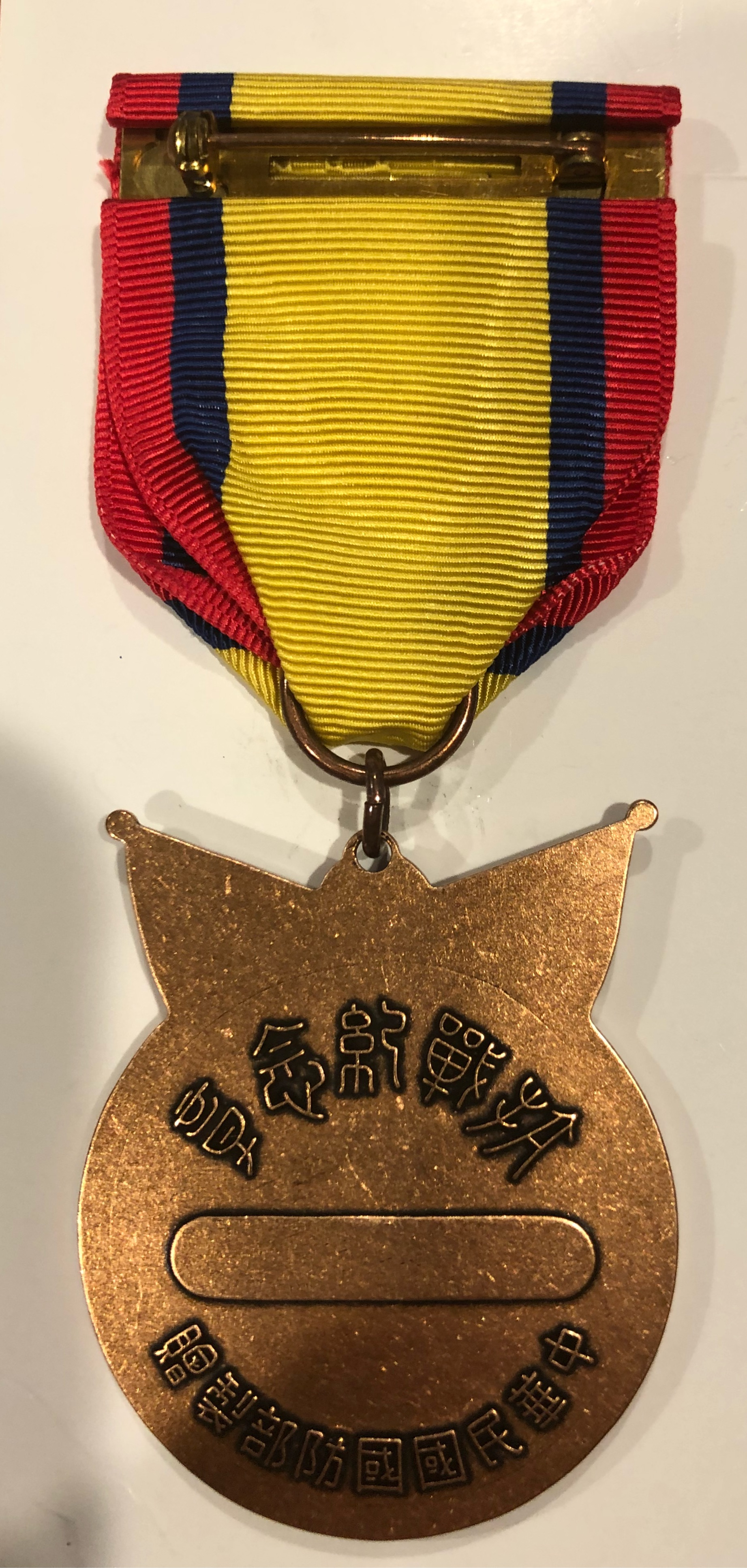
- Obverse and reverse of the medal
- Awarded for: Service in the Second Sino-Japanese War
- Presented by: Republic of China
- Eligibility: Chinese, as well as foreign, military and civilian personnel who were directly involved in the war.
- Established: 1944
- First award: 1946

This China War Memorial Medal, also known as the Medal in Commemoration of Victory in the Resistance Against Aggression (Chinese: 抗戰勝利勳章) was authorized after the Second Sino-Japanese War (World War II) by the Republic of China government for servicemen who assisted the Chinese Government fighting against the Japanese during the war. Members of the Fourteenth Air Force, the Flying Tigers, were eligible to be awarded this medal. The medal was created in 1944 and first distributed in 1946 to those who met the requirements from the Chinese Nationalist Government. Lt. General Claire Lee Chennault and Anna Chennault were a few who had received this medal.

== Eligibility ==
Those eligible to get the China War Memorial Medal were those who served in mainland China, Burma, Vietnam and Thailand for 30 days from the time period of December 7, 1941 – September 2, 1945.

== Acceptance ==
This medal may be accepted under Pub. L. 80–314: Public Law 80-314 which allows US personnel to wear this medal after all foreign decorations.

== Description ==
The Marco Polo Bridge is on the obverse with two flags of the Republic of China and Chairman Chiang Kai-shek between the flags. On the reverse, is a ribbon for an engraving of the service member's name or serial number.

The ribbon of the medal is yellow with red edges 3/16 inch (4.8 mm) wide, between the red and yellow are blue stripes 1/8 inch (3.2 mm) wide. A round metal Chinese sunburst emblem is placed in the center of the suspension and service ribbons.
