= David M. Jones =

United States Air Force general (1913–2008)

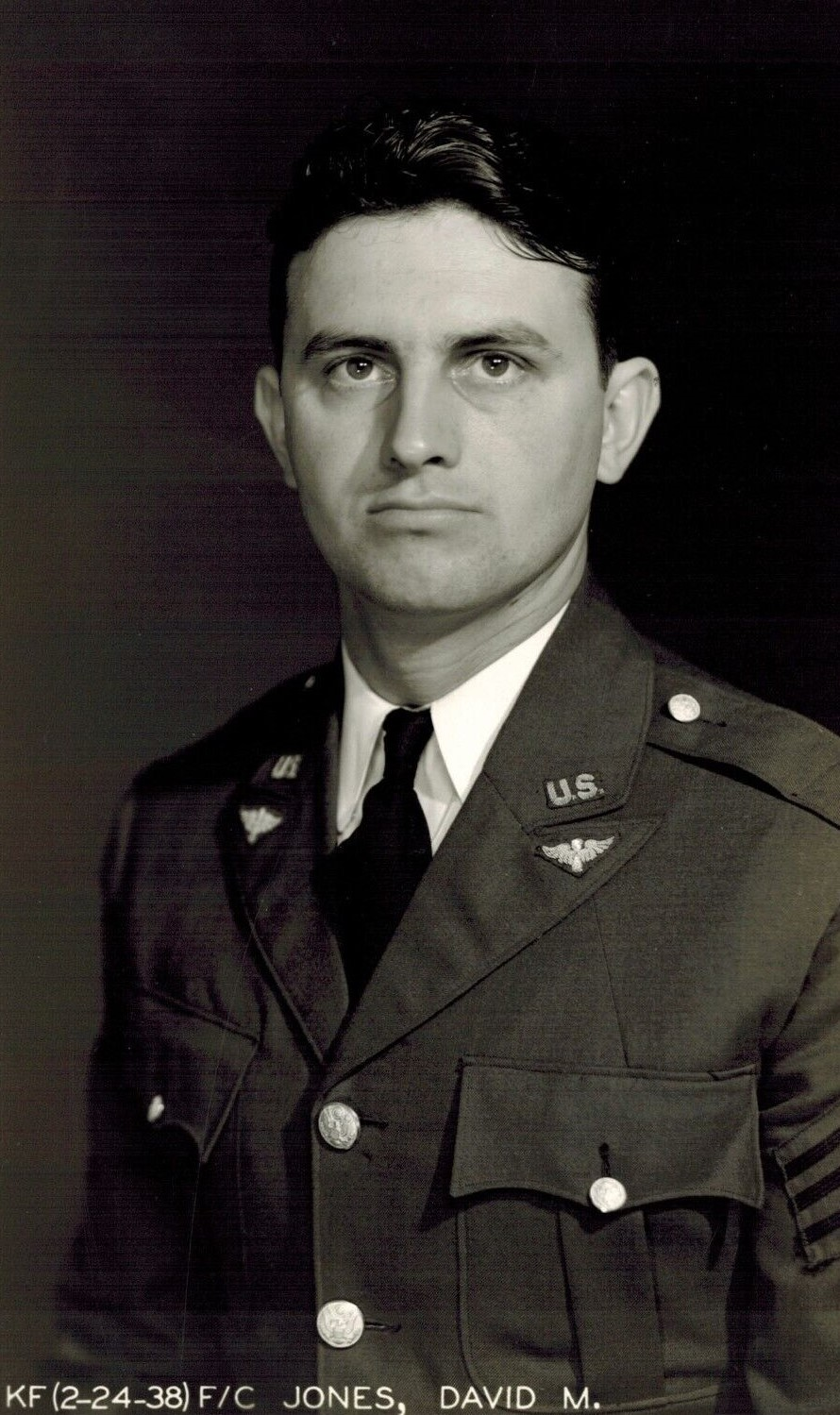
- David M. Jones in 1938
- Born: December 18, 1913; Marshfield, Oregon
- Died: November 25, 2008 (aged 94); Tucson, Arizona
- Burial place: Arlington National Cemetery
- Military career
- Allegiance: United States of America
- Branch: United States Air Force
- Service years: 1936–1973
- Rank: Major general
- Unit: 17th Bombardment Group ("Doolittle Raiders")
- Conflicts: World War II: Pacific War; Doolittle Raid; North Africa Campaign; The Great Escape
- Awards: Distinguished Service Medal; Legion of Merit; Distinguished Flying Cross (2); Purple Heart

David Mudgett Jones (December 18, 1913 – November 25, 2008) served with distinction as a pilot and general officer, first with the U.S. Army Air Corps (he entered pilot training in June 1937) and later with the United States Army Air Forces and, after September 18, 1947, the United States Air Force. His record during World War II includes being one of the Doolittle Raiders whose exploits in April 1942 were dramatized in the film Thirty Seconds Over Tokyo. He then flew combat missions over North Africa, where he was shot down. He was a German prisoner of war for two and a half years, helping with the April 1944 mass escape at Stalag Luft III, and was the inspiration for Steve McQueen's fictional character, USAAF Captain Virgil Hilts, which was dramatized in the 1963 movie The Great Escape.

In his last assignment with the Air Force, Jones was the commander of the Air Force Eastern Test Range headquartered at Patrick AFB, Florida. He held concurrent responsibility for Cape Kennedy Air Force Station, renamed as Cape Canaveral Air Force Station during his tenure, and the Malabar Transmitter Annex in Florida. He also served as the Department of Defense Manager for Manned Space Flight Support Operations during his final active duty assignment, retiring from the Air Force in 1973.

== Early years; education ==
Jones was born on December 18, 1913, in Marshfield, Oregon, the son of David Arthur (Dade) Jones and Grace Mudgett. His father Dade Jones, the son of Welsh immigrants, homesteaded land in Meadow Lake Township, North Dakota in 1896 before marrying Grace and moving to Oregon.

David Jones enlisted in the Arizona National Guard while he was attending the University of Arizona at Tucson, from 1932 to 1936, where he was also inducted as a member of the Sigma Chi fraternity. His later education included three major Armed Forces schools: Command and General Staff School in Fort Leavenworth, Kansas, 1946; Armed Forces Staff College in Norfolk, Virginia, 1948; and the National War College in Washington, D.C., 1956.

Jones was commissioned a second lieutenant in the U.S. Cavalry arm of the Arizona Army National Guard, where he served one year of active duty before transferring to the Army Air Corps and entering pilot training in June 1937. After earning his wings in June 1938, he served as a Northrop A-17 pilot with the 95th Attack Squadron of the 17th Attack Group, based at March Field, California.

In 1939 the 17th was re-designated a medium bombardment group and transferred to McChord Field, Washington. By September 1941 it became the first unit of the Army Air Forces to be fully equipped with the new B-25 Mitchell medium bomber.

== World War II ==
=== Doolittle Raid ===
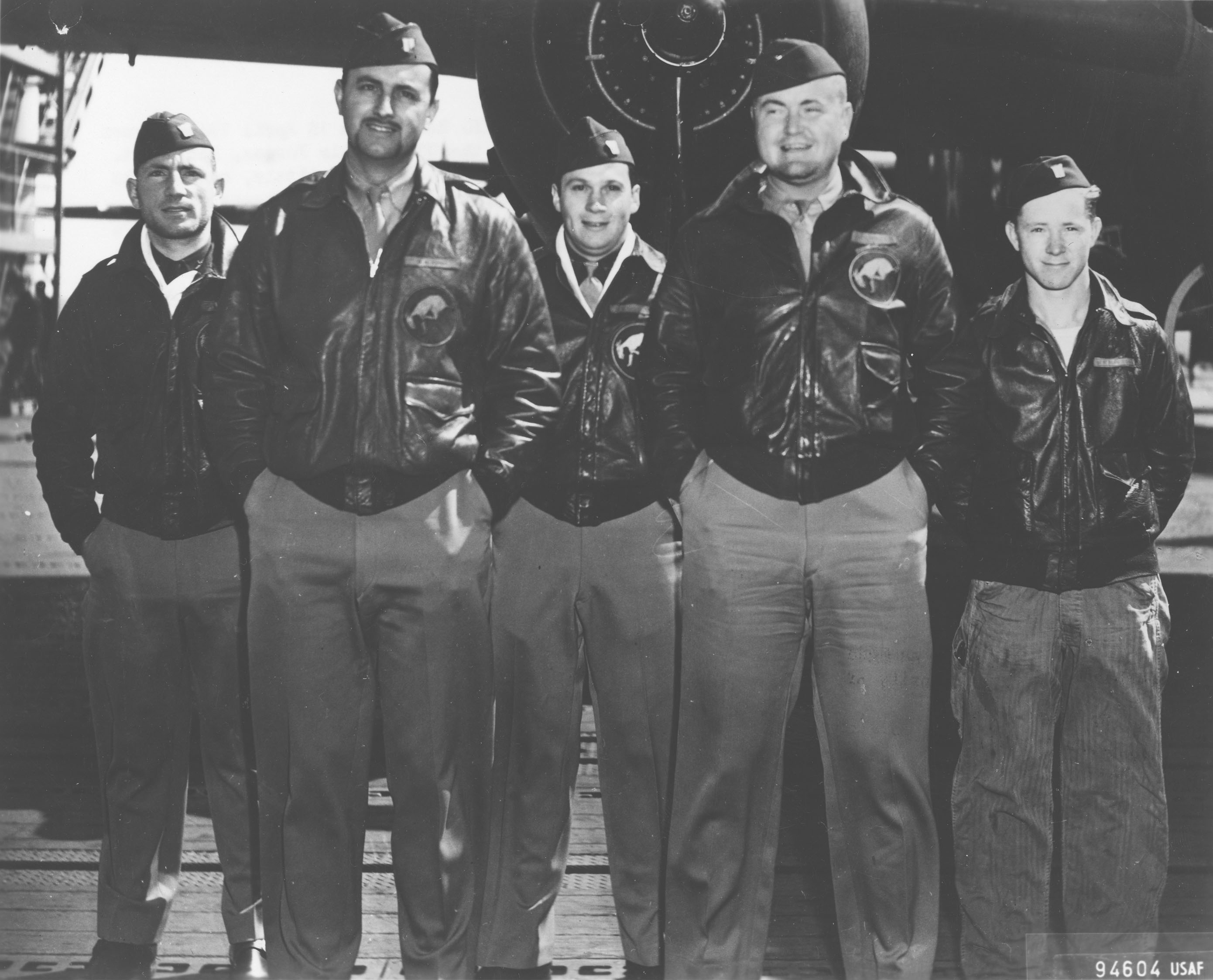
Doolittle Raider Crew No. 5: Front row: Capt. David M. Jones, pilot; Lt. Rodney R. Wilder, copilot; back row: Lt. Eugene F. McGurl, navigator; Lt. Denver V. Truelove, bombardier; Sgt. Joseph W. Manske, flight engineer/gunner.

In early 1942, Jones volunteered for the Doolittle Project – a secret bombing raid to be launched on Japan in retaliation for the December 1941 attack on Pearl Harbor. During the training phase of this project, he acted as navigation and intelligence officer for the ad hoc squadron of B-25 bombers. On April 18, 1942, the Doolittle Raid launched from the United States Navy's aircraft carrier USS Hornet (CV-8), dropping their bombs on Tokyo and four other Japanese cities. This raid was the first good news that the Americans had from the Pacific front.

Lacking the fuel to make a safe landing after the raid, Jones bailed out over China, where he was assisted by the Chinese people in evading capture. He received the Distinguished Flying Cross for his participation as a flight commander in the planning, training and completion of the mission. After escaping capture, Jones was flown to India, where he spent three months with the 22nd Bomb Squadron flying further B-25 missions against the Japanese.

=== North Africa and Stalag Luft III ===
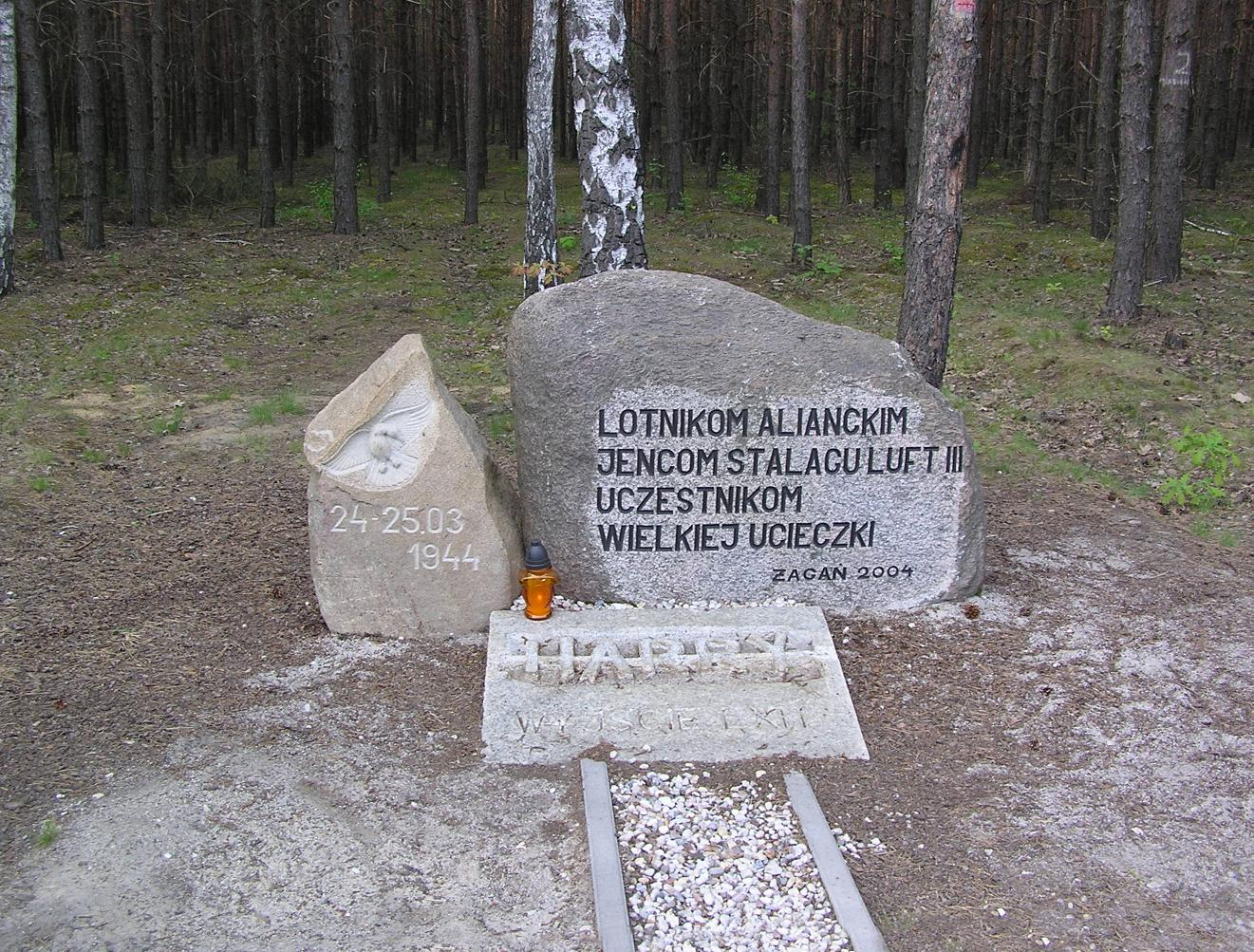
Scene of the "Harry" tunnel in Stalag Luft III.

In September 1942, Jones was assigned to the new 319th Bombardment Group, preparing for combat in North Africa. He was assigned to develop low-level bombing tactics and techniques due to his experience with the Doolittle project and his belief in low-level bombing tactics. On December 4, 1942, he was shot down over Bizerte, North Africa, and spent two and a half years as a prisoner of war in Stalag Luft III. As a result of his constant agitation and harassment of the enemy, he was selected for the "escape committee" by fellow prisoners. The committee reviewed escape plans and directed escapes. Jones led one of the digging teams on tunnel "Harry" used in the Great Escape, chronicled in the Paul Brickhill's autobiographical book, and portrayed in the 1963 film. After his liberation in April 1945, Jones was commended for leadership among his fellow prisoners.

== Post-World War II ==
In July 1946, Jones was assigned as an air inspector at Headquarters Air Training Command. He followed this with attendance at the Armed Forces Staff College, which he completed in 1948. During this time, the U.S. Army Air Forces was disestablished and his commission was transferred to the newly established United States Air Force. He then served as Director of War Plans at Headquarters Tactical Air Command at Langley AFB, Virginia, followed by an assignment as Director of Combat Operations for the Ninth Air Force; then as Commander of the 47th Bombardment Group, until February 1952.

He was then the commander of the 47th Bombardment Wing (a B-45 Tornado jetbomber wing) at Langley Air Force Base, Virginia and at RAF Sculthorpe, England until July 1955.

=== Test pilot ===
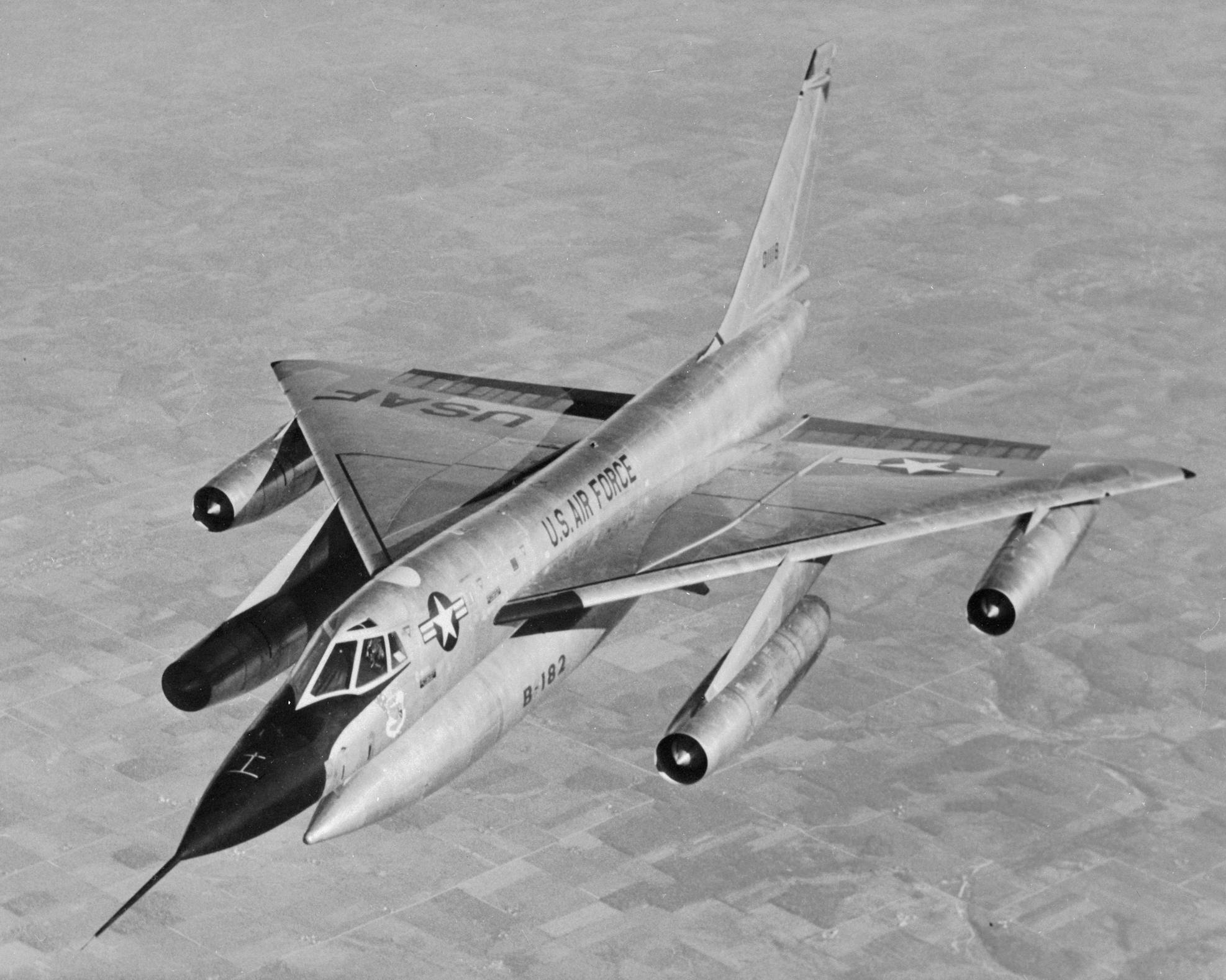
B-58 Hustler

Jones began working in research and development in 1956 when he was the Deputy Chief of Staff for Operations for the Air Proving Ground Command at Eglin Air Force Base, Florida. His experience in bombardment-type aircraft and previous command staff assignments in research and development resulted in his being selected director of the B-58 Test Force, organized in February 1958 at Carswell Air Force Base, Texas. The B-58 Hustler was the first operational jet bomber capable of Mach 2 supersonic flight. During this time, Jones continued to maintain his flight status in the B-58, TF-102, and T-33 aircraft; participating in design speed dashes, low-level penetrations, night, weather, formation and inflight refueling missions. He had more supersonic time testing the B-58 than any senior U.S. Air Force pilot.

In September 1960, he became vice commander of the Wright Air Development Division at Wright-Patterson Air Force Base, Ohio. In October 1961, he was named program manager of the GAM-87 "Skybolt" at Air Force Systems Command's Aeronautical Systems Division. When that project was cancelled, he became ASD deputy for systems management and later vice commander.

In August 1964, he became deputy chief of staff for systems at Headquarters Air Force Systems Command at Andrews Air Force Base, Maryland, which had responsibility for all USAF research, development, and weapon system acquisition.

=== NASA ===
In December 1964, Jones became Deputy Assistant Administrator for Manned Space Flight with the National Aeronautics and Space Administration (NASA). In July 1965, he was given responsibility for development of the S-IVB Orbital Workshop and spent-stage experiment support module (SSESM) – a concept of "in-orbit" conversion of a spent S-IVB stage to a shelter. In August 1965, he took on the additional duties as of the Saturn/Apollo Applications (SAA) Acting Director. Then, in May 1967, he assumed duties as commander of the Air Force Eastern Test Range, Patrick AFB and Cape Kennedy AFS, Florida.

== Retirement and death ==
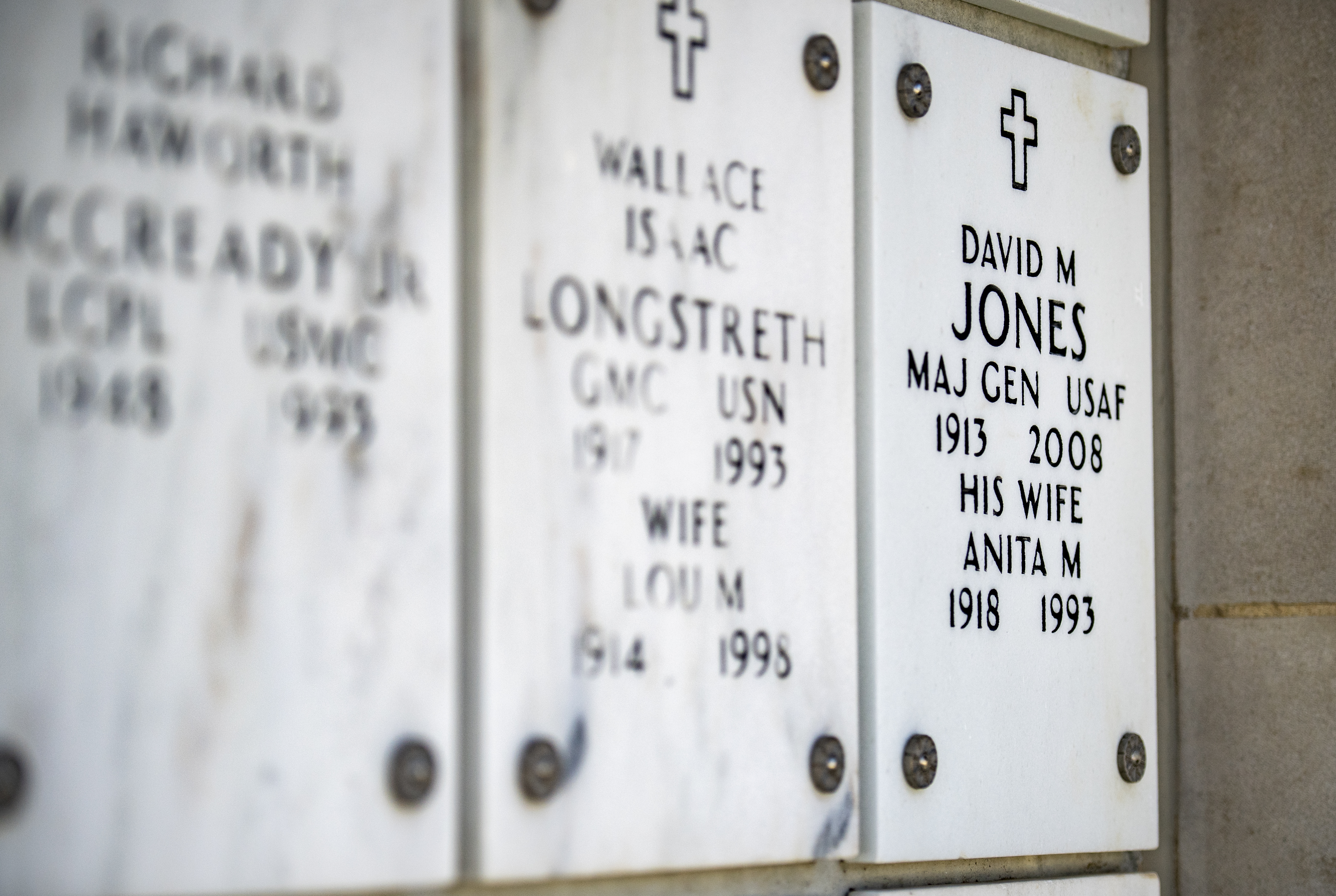
Grave at Arlington National Cemetery

Jones retired at the rank of major general on May 31, 1973. He was one of five Doolittle Raiders who later became general officers; the others are James H. Doolittle, John A. Hilger, Everett W. Holstrom, and Richard A. Knobloch.

In 2002, Jones attended the 50th reunion of the 47th Bombardment Wing at RAF Sculthorpe.

He presented the RAF Sculthorpe Heritage Centre with a photo of a B-45.

Jones died on November 25, 2008, at age 94, at his home in Tucson, Arizona. He was preceded in death by his first wife Anita Maddox Jones, and survived by his wife Janna-Neen Johnson-Dingell-Cunningham-Jones, daughter (Jere Jones Yeager), two sons (David Jones and Jim Jones) and a stepdaughter (Ann-Eve Grace Dingell-Cunningham). At the time of his death, out of the eighty men who participated in the Doolittle Raid, there were ten survivors.

== Awards and decorations ==
Major General Jones' military decorations and awards include:

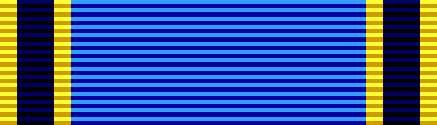

U.S. Air Force Command Pilot Badge
Air Force Distinguished Service Medal	Legion of Merit	Distinguished Flying Cross with bronze oak leaf cluster
Purple Heart	Air Medal	Air Force Commendation Medal with bronze oak leaf cluster
NASA Distinguished Service Medal	NASA Exceptional Service Medal	Prisoner of War Medal
American Defense Service Medal	American Campaign Medal	Asiatic-Pacific Campaign Medal with two bronze campaign stars
European–African–Middle Eastern Campaign Medal with two bronze campaign stars	World War II Victory Medal	National Defense Service Medal with bronze service star
Air Force Longevity Service Award with one silver and three bronze oak leaf clusters	Republic of China Medal of the Armed Forces	Republic of China War Memorial Medal

== See also ==
- Jimmy Doolittle
- NASA
- Test pilot
- Thirty Seconds Over Tokyo, 1944 film on the Doolittle Raid, starring Spencer Tracy. Jones was played by actor Scott McKay.
