= Everett W. Holstrom =

United States Air Force general (1916–2000)

Everett Wayne Holstrom
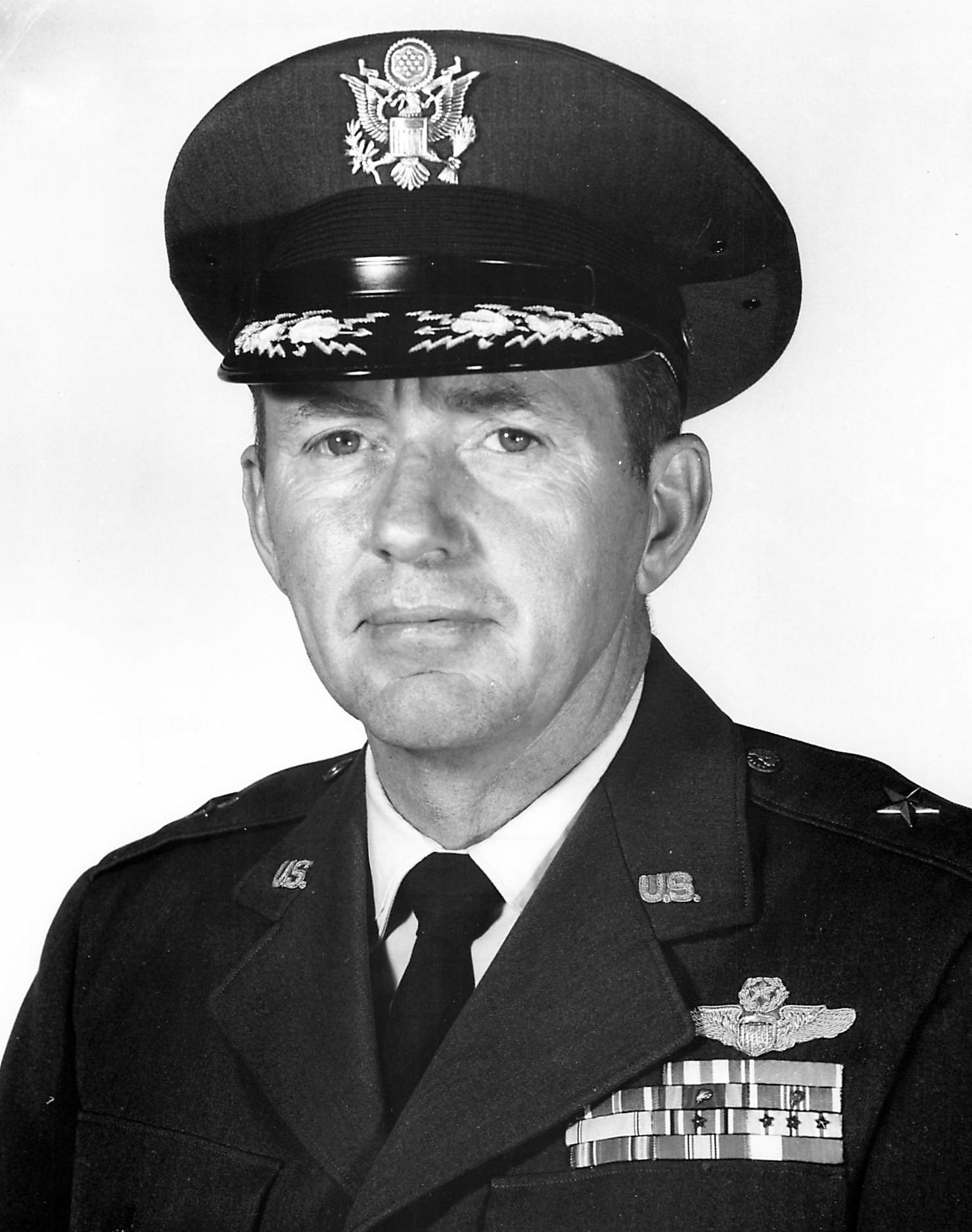
- Born: May 4, 1916; Cottage Grove, Oregon, U.S.
- Died: December 2, 2000 (aged 84); Soldotna, Alaska, U.S.
- Burial place: Arlington National Cemetery
- Military career
- Allegiance: United States
- Branch: United States Air Force
- Service years: 1934–1969
- Rank: Brigadier General
- Nickname: Brick
- Units: 95th Bomb Squadron, 17th Bomb Group; 11th Bomb Squadron, 341st Bomb Group
- Commands: 11th Bomb Squadron; 3234th Strategic Reconnaissance Squadron; 91st Bomb Wing; 301st Bomb Wing; 4130th Strategic Wing; 43rd Bomb Wing; 4130th Strategic Wing; 816th Strategic Aerospace Division; 12th Strategic Aerospace Division
- Conflicts: World War II; Vietnam War
- Awards: Silver Star; Legion of Merit (2); Distinguished Flying Cross (2); Air Medal (5)

Everett Wayne Holstrom (4 May 1916 – 2 December 2000) was a United States Army Air Forces bomber pilot and participant of the Doolittle Raid during World War II. He retired from the United States Air Force in 1969 at the rank of brigadier general.

== Early life ==
Born on May 4, 1916, in Cottage Grove, Oregon, he graduated from Pleasant Hill High School in 1934 and on the same year, he enlisted in the Oregon Army National Guard, where he was trained as a radio operator. At the same time, he attended Oregon State College, where he majored in forestry. He enlisted in the Aviation Cadet Program of the U.S. Army Air Corps at Fort Lewis in Washington, in December 1939.

== Military service ==
He was awarded his pilot wings and commissioned as second lieutenant, at Kelly Field in Texas, on August 30, 1940. Holstrom was then assigned to the 95th Bomb Squadron of the 17th Bomb Group at McChord Field in Washington, where he flew the B-23 Dragons and then the B-25 Mitchells. In September 1940, the unit was transferred to Pendelton, Oregon.

=== World War II ===
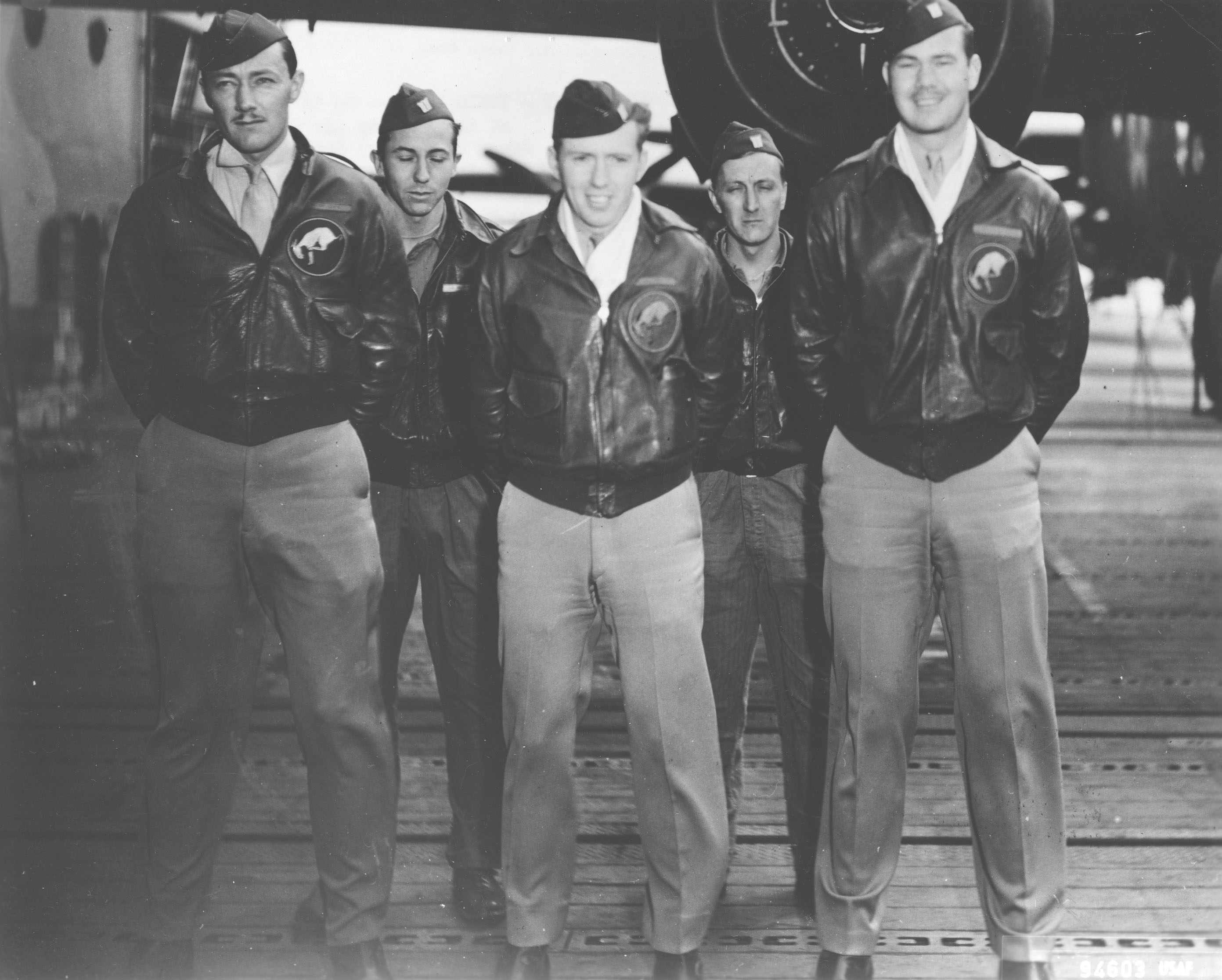
Doolittle Tokyo Raiders, Crew No. 4, 95th Bomb Squadron. From left to right: Lt. Harry C. McCool, navigator; Cpl. Bert M. Jordan, flight engineer/gunner; Lt. Everett W. Holstrom, pilot; Sgt. Robert J. Stephens, bombardier; Lt. Lucian N. Youngblood, copilot. On the deck of USS Hornet, April 18, 1942

After the Japanese attack on Pearl Harbor on December 7, 1941, the 17th BG immediately began anti-submarine patrols off the coast of Oregon and Washington. According to the United States Department of War, Holstrom was credited in destroying the first Japanese submarine off the mouth of Columbia River on December 25, 1941, although post-war records of both the US and Japanese revealed no confirmation of a lost submarine.

Holstrom volunteered for the first American aerial attack on Japan. The air raid, which came to be called the Doolittle Raid, after Lieutenant Colonel James "Jimmy" Doolittle, took place on April 18, 1942. Holstrom piloted one of the sixteen B-25B Mitchell medium bombers that took off from the USS Hornet to attack Tokyo. Shortly after takeoff, engineer-gunner of Holstrom's bomber Cpl. Bert M. Jordan advised that the turret gun would not function, leaving the bomber protected only by a single .30-caliber nose-gun. This became critical as the bomber approached land just south of Tokyo and was attacked by four Japanese fighter planes. As a result, Holstrom ordered his bombs jettisoned into the Tokyo Bay before continuing to fly on to China. Running low on fuel due to the early launch of the raid, the B-25s failed to reach any of the designated safety zones in China. Holstrom and his crew bailed out over the city of Shangrao in Jiangxi Province, China. After evading Japanese patrols from three days, they were escorted by Chinese guerillas to Chungking, where Holstrom and other bomber crews were decorated by Madame Chiang Kai-shek on April 30.

After the raid, Holstrom was assigned in the China-Burma-India Theater, where he flew missions as a B-25 pilot with the 11th Bomb Squadron of the 341st Bomb Group in India from April 1942 to January 1943. He was assigned as commander of the 11th BS from January to May 1943, before returning to the United States in June 1943. He took part in the war bond sales across the United States. Until the end of World War II, he was assigned to variety of stateside assignments.

=== Post war ===
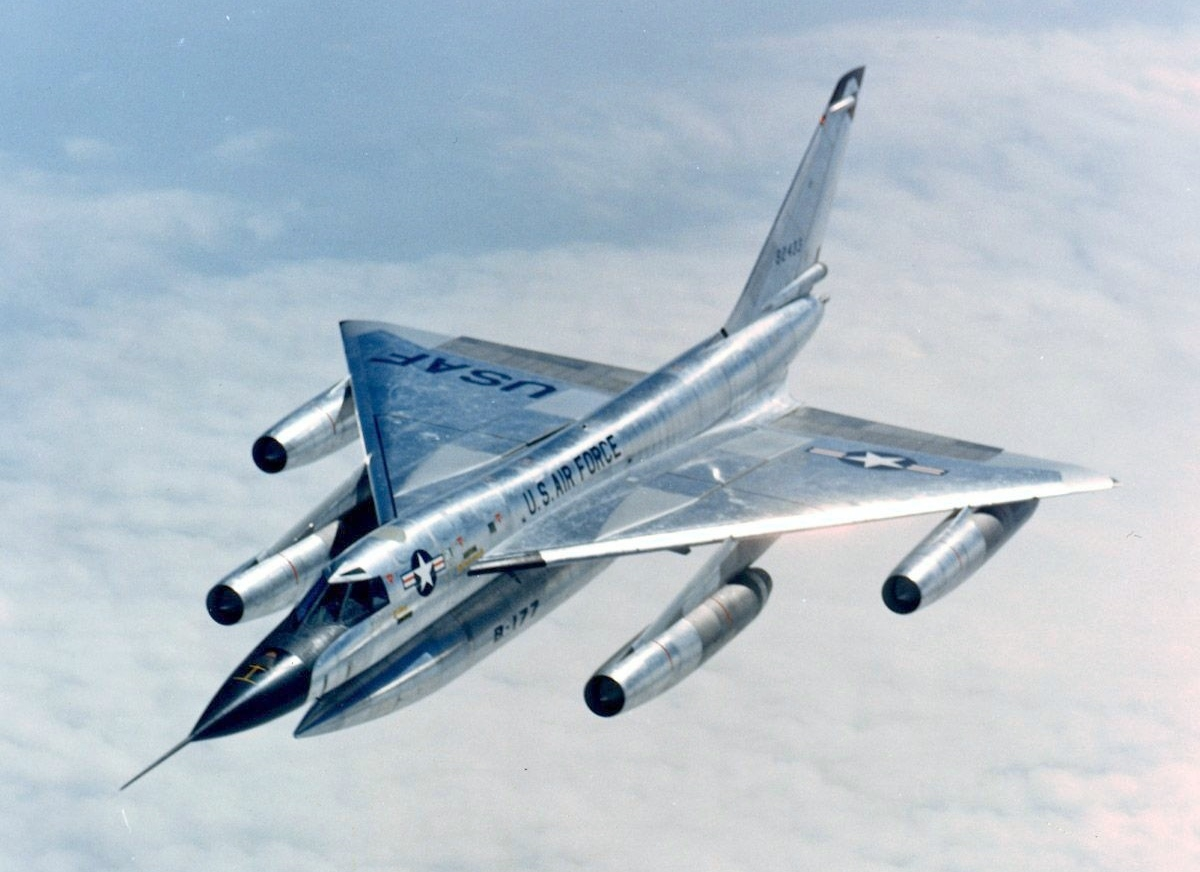
Convair B-58 Hustler

Following World War II, Holstrom was assigned to Strategic Air Command Headquarters at Offut Air Force Base in Nebraska as an operations staff officer. From 1950 to 1953, he was a member of the 91st Bomb Wing as director of operations and also as deputy wing commander and moved with the wing from Barksdale Air Force Base in Louisiana to Lockbourne Air Force Base in Ohio. From 1953 to 1955, he was assigned to Second Air Force headquarters as director of operations. For the next two years, he commanded the 301st Bomb Wing at Barksdale and then returned to SAC headquarters from 1957 to 1959 as chief of the Operation Plans Division.

On September 4, 1959, he assumed duties as commander of Second Air Force's 4130th Strategic Wing at Bergstrom Air Force Base in Texas. In June 1961, he assumed command of the 43d Bomb Wing, SAC's first supersonic bombardment wing, which was equipped with the Convair B-58 Hustler. He has flown all the multi-engine jet bombers in the SAC inventory including the North American B-45 Tornado, Boeing B-47 Stratojet and Boeing B-52 Stratofortress. Holstrom was promoted to brigadier general on March 1, 1964. After holding commands of the 816th and 12th Strategic Aerospace Divisions, his final assignment was with NATO at Mons, Belgium, where he served as the Deputy Chief of Staff of the United States for the secret planning group LIVE OAK. He retired from the Air Force on July 1, 1969. He was one of five Doolittle Raiders who later became general officers; the others are Jimmy Doolittle, John A. Hilger, David M. Jones, and Richard A. Knobloch.

== Later life ==
Holstrom was married to Harriet Holstrom, née Fisher (1920–2015) on August 30, 1941. The couple had five children, and numerous grand and great-grandchildren.

He died on December 2, 2000, at the age of 84. He was cremated and his ashes were interred at Arlington National Cemetery.

== Awards and decorations ==
His awards include:

Command Pilot
Silver Star		Legion of Merit with bronze oak leaf cluster
Distinguished Flying Cross with bronze oak leaf cluster	Air Medal with four bronze oak leaf clusters	Army Commendation Medal with bronze oak leaf cluster
Air Force Outstanding Unit Award	American Defense Service Medal	American Campaign Medal with service star
Asiatic-Pacific Campaign Medal with three bronze campaign stars	World War II Victory Medal	National Defense Service Medal with service star
Vietnam Service Medal	Air Force Longevity Service Award with silver oak leaf cluster	Republic of China Medal of the Armed Forces; A-1
Republic of China War Memorial Medal	Republic of Vietnam Gallantry Cross	Republic of Vietnam Campaign Medal

His Distinguished Flying Cross citation reads:

The President of the United States of America, authorized by Act of Congress, July 2, 1926, takes pleasure in presenting the Distinguished Flying Cross to Captain (Air Corps) Everett Wayne Holstrom, United States Army Air Forces, for extraordinary achievement as Pilot of a B-25 Bomber of the 1st Special Aviation Project (Doolittle Raider Force), while participating in a highly destructive raid on the Japanese mainland on 18 April 1942. Captain Holstrom with 79 other officers and enlisted men volunteered for this mission knowing full well that the chances of survival were extremely remote, and executed his part in it with great skill and daring. This achievement reflects high credit on himself and the military service.
