= Denver V. Truelove =

American air force pilot (1919–1943)

Denver Vernon Truelove
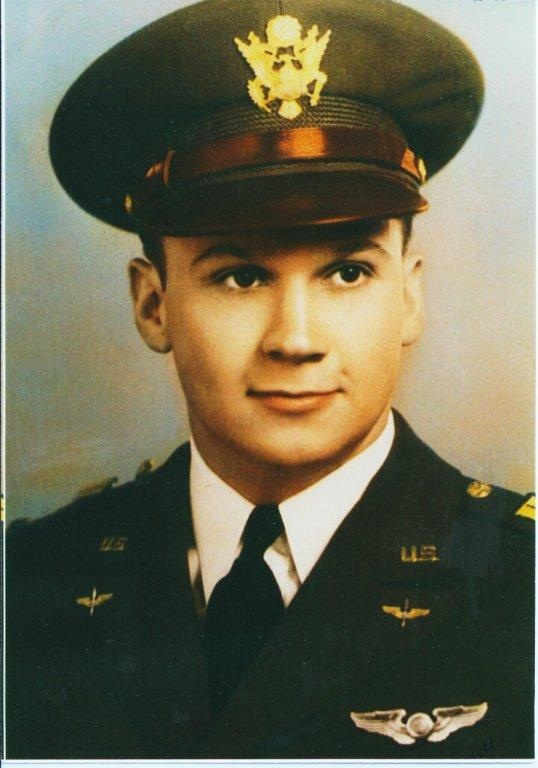
- Born: April 10, 1919; Clermont, Georgia, U.S.
- Died: April 5, 1943 (aged 23) †; Mediterranean Sea †
- Burial place: North Africa American Cemetery and Memorial
- Military career
- Allegiance: United States of America
- Branch: United States Army Air Forces
- Service years: 1940–1943
- Rank: Captain
- Units: 95th Bomb Squadron, 17th Bomb Group; 28th Bomb Squadron, 310th Bomb Group
- Conflicts: World War II
- Awards: Distinguished Flying Cross; Purple Heart; Air Medal

Denver Vernon Truelove (April 10, 1919 – April 5, 1943) was a United States Army Air Forces bombardier who served during World War II. He was one of the eighty Doolittle Raiders who bombed Japan in April 1942. After the Doolittle Raid, Truelove was involved briefly in North Africa. His awards included the Distinguished Flying Cross and Purple Heart.

== Early life ==
Denver Truelove was born in Clermont, Georgia, on April 10, 1919. He lived in Lula, Georgia with his parents, Clyde and Gertrude, and sister, Blanche, until his enlistment in the U.S. Army in May 1940. He went on active duty in the Army Air Corps on September 15, 1941.

== World War II ==
=== Doolittle Raid ===
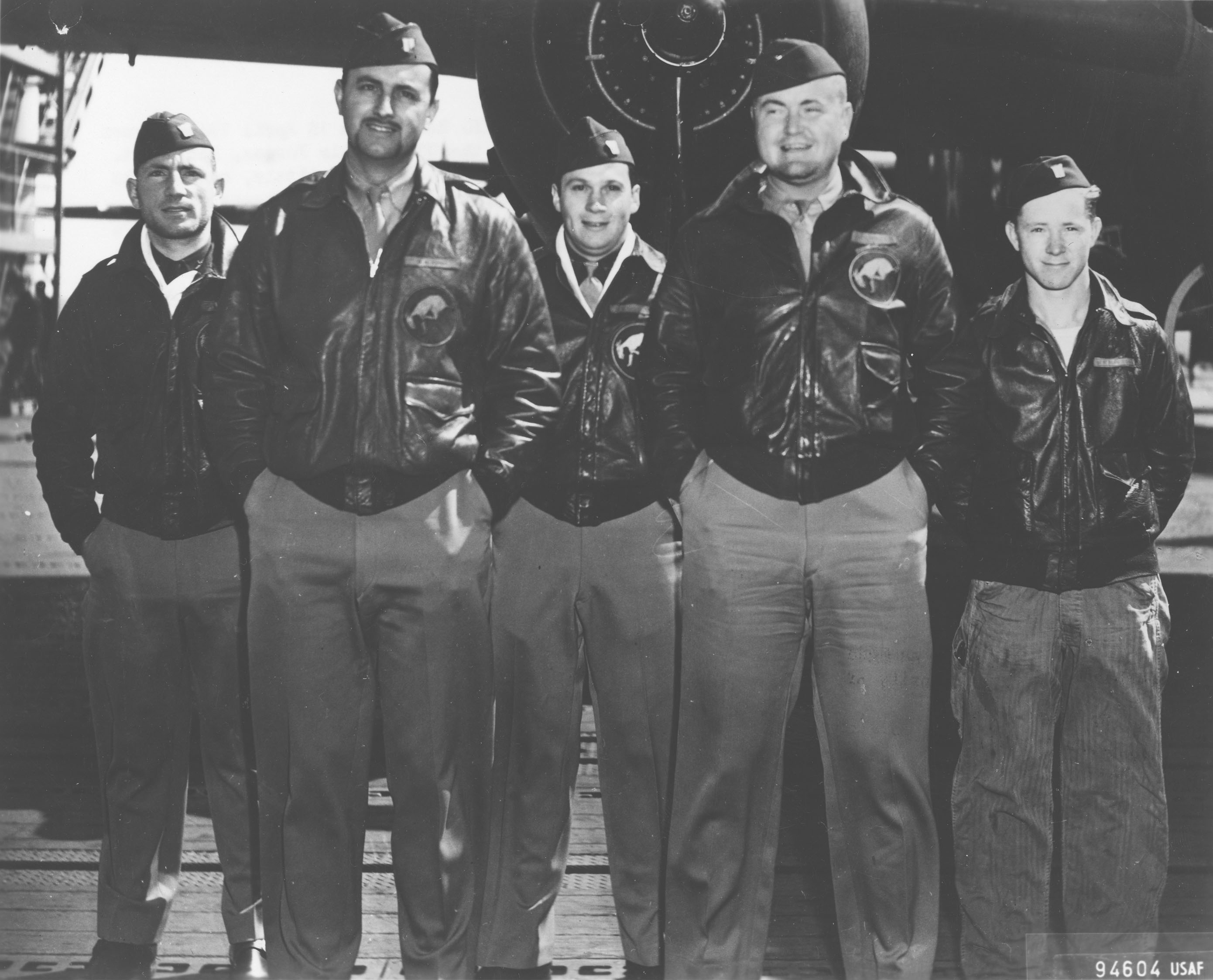
The crew of plane #5 (L to R): Lt. Eugene McGurl, Capt. David Jones, Lt. Denver Truelove, Lt. Rodney Wilder, and Sgt. Joseph Manske (USAF Photo).

Truelove volunteered for a secret mission that became known as the Doolittle Raid, named for its leader, the famous aviator James H. "Jimmy" Doolittle. The raid was meant to bomb the Japanese in response to the December 1941 attack on Pearl Harbor. Truelove was the bombardier for plane crew #5, one of the 16 B-25 planes that took off from the aircraft carrier USS Hornet. In a well-known account of the raid, Thirty Seconds Over Tokyo, author and raider Ted Lawson mentions eating blueberry pie with Lt. Truelove, ignoring the battle-stations drill. During the mission, Truelove successfully dropped bombs on the capital city, Tokyo. Truelove's crew, piloted by David M. Jones, bailed out over China. Truelove and the other Raiders later received the Distinguished Flying Cross for their role in the mission.

=== Post-Doolittle Raid ===
After the Doolittle Raid, Denver was on leave in Georgia. He was incredibly successful in War Bond sales, at one point outselling Dorothy Lamour when he sold $70,000 in bonds.

After a short time in England, Truelove was stationed in North Africa. During this time, he was promoted to captain. In North Africa, he checked fliers in and out and also flew on some missions. "When I do not fly, I check others out and in. Some do not return. I have been around the world. Our country is the best, and I am willing to die for our USA," Truelove wrote in a letter to his family. Captain Truelove was assigned to the 428th Bomb Squadron, 310th Bomb Group. On April 5, 1943, his unit was attacking an Axis shipping convoy in the Mediterranean Sea. Off Trapini, Sicily, his B-25, piloted by Captain Richards A. Aldridge, was shot down. Of the crew of six on board, Truelove, Captain Richard T. Norvell, and Technical Sergeant Warren V. Richardson were not recovered and were declared Missing in Action (MIA).

== Awards and honors ==
Denver received many awards, including the Distinguished Flying Cross, Purple Heart, Air Medal with three oak leaf cluster, American Campaign Medal, Defense Medal, and Foreign Service Medal. He was also awarded a Chinese air force medal by Madame Chiang Kai-Shek.

In 2010, a stone monument was constructed to honor Truelove in his hometown of Lula, Georgia.

== See also ==
- List of people who disappeared mysteriously at sea
