= Pleasant Hill High School (Oregon) =

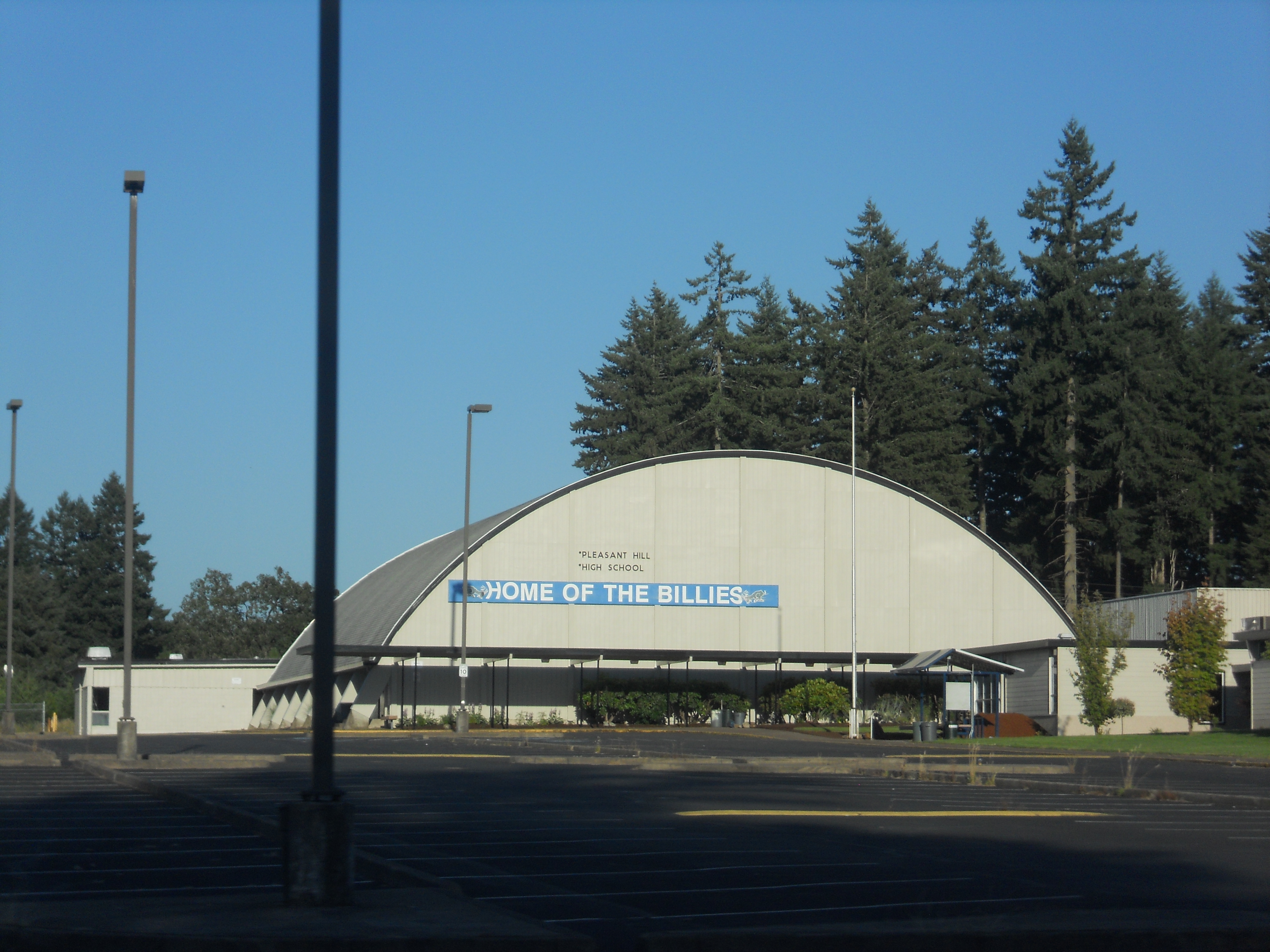

Location
- 36386 Highway 58; Pleasant Hill, (Lane County), Oregon 97455; United States; 43.957109°N 122.916455°W

Information
- Type: Public
- School district: Pleasant Hill School District
- Principal: Chris Reiersgaard
- Grades: 6-12
- Enrollment: 583 Transfers (2016-17)
- Colors: Navy and gold
- Athletics conference: OSAA PacWest Conference 3A
- Mascot: Billy goat
- Team name: Billies
- Website: www.pleasanthill.k12.or.us

Pleasant Hill High School is a public school in Pleasant Hill, Oregon, United States, serving grades six through twelve. The school served grades nine through twelve until 2009, when the Pleasant Hill School District closed the district's Junior High School because of declining enrollment and funding issues. The students were redistributed, K-5 going to the middle school buildings and 6-12 going to the high school buildings. The current high school building was constructed in 1961, and rebuilt in 2016.

== Academics ==
In 1984, Pleasant Hill High School was honored in the Blue Ribbon Schools Program, the highest honor a school can receive in the United States.

In 2008, 86% of the school's seniors received a high school diploma. Of 96 students, 83 graduated, nine dropped out, three received a modified diploma, and one was still in high school the following year.

== Athletics ==
The school's mascot is the billy goat and its athletic teams' nickname is the "Billies". Formerly the teams were known as the Hillbillies, but only for three years in the "Ma and Pa Kettle" movie era. An early publication of the school in the 1920s was The Goat's Gazette, showing that the original team name did refer to the goat, not "hillbillies."

In 1910, the basketball team went undefeated, beating the University of Oregon's second team as well as Springfield and Eugene high schools.

== Notable alumni ==
- Russ Francis, NFL player; Super Bowl Champion with San Francisco 49ers; member of Oregon State Sports Hall of° Fame; national and world record holder for javelin, 1971
- Joe Freuen, trombone player in the Cherry Poppin' Daddies
- Everett W. Holstrom, United States Air Force brigadier general and participant in the Doolittle Raid during World War II.
