= Boeing XB-59 =

Medium bomber project, U.S. Air Force, canceled 1952

XB-59
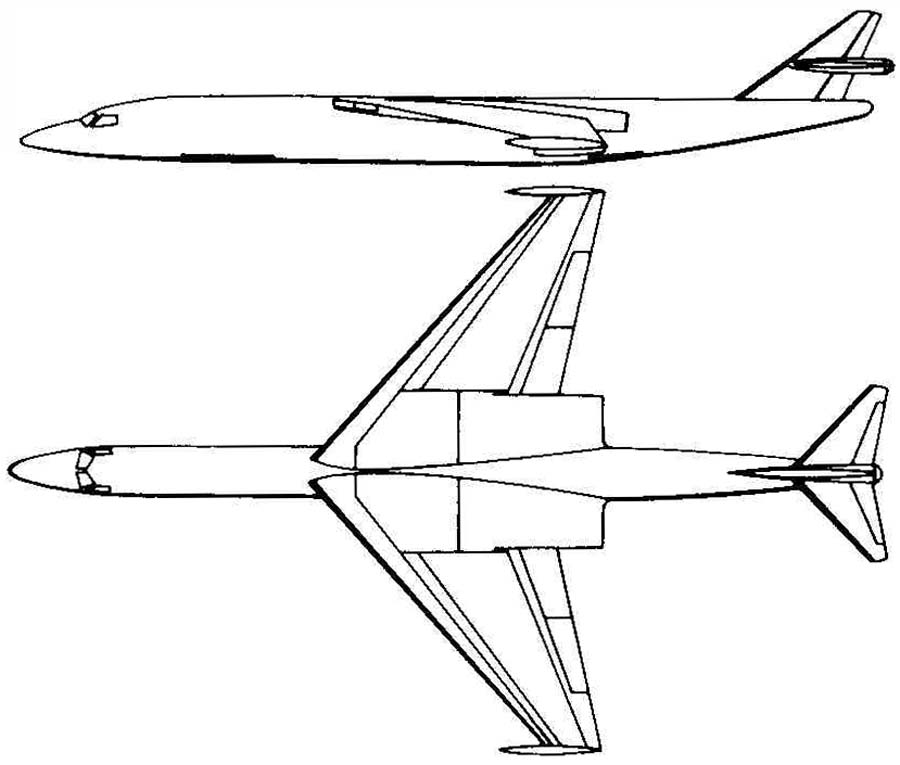
- Boeing concept drawing of the XB-59

General information
- Type: Supersonic medium bomber
- National origin: United States
- Manufacturer: Boeing
- Status: Canceled in 1952
- Primary user: United States Air Force
- Number built: 0

The Boeing XB-59 (model number 701), was a 1950s proposal for an American supersonic bomber aircraft.

== Design and development ==
In 1949 the US government canceled the Boeing XB-55 contract, which had been an effort to produce a subsonic replacement for the just-being-introduced Boeing B-47 Stratojet. The XB-55 project had started in 1947, but by the end of the decade it was apparent that if strategic penetration in warfare were to be successful at all, it would require aircraft much faster than the jet fighter aircraft which were then being placed into operation. Thus, the funding made available by the XB-55 cancellation was earmarked for the study of a supersonic medium bomber, and a request for proposals was extended to several aircraft companies.

Boeing submitted a proposal for a four-engine, high-wing aircraft with a highly streamlined fuselage. The four engines would be buried in thickened wing roots; the remaining wing planform was highly tapered.

Developed under weapons system designation MX-1965, the XB-59 was to have a crew of three, and would be powered by four GE J73-X24A turbojet engines, mounted in the roots of the 73-foot span wings. The landing gear would be similar to the bicycle arrangement found on the B-47 and B-52 Stratofortress, with wingtip-mounted outriggers.

The Boeing contract for the XB-59 was canceled in late 1952 after the Convair company's submission, designated B-58 Hustler, was selected for development.

The Boeing effort was a design study only, and no construction was involved.

== Specifications ==
Data from US Bombers, Lloyd S. Jones, 1974

General characteristics

- Crew: 3
- Length: 123 ft 4 in (37.59 m)
- Wingspan: 81 ft 4 in (24.79 m)
- Height: 25 ft 5 in (7.75 m)
- Wing area: 1,650 sq ft (153 m^{2})
- Empty weight: 63,200 lb (28,667 kg)
- Gross weight: 148,300 lb (67,268 kg)
- Powerplant: 4 × General Electric J73-X24A afterburning turbojets, 14,000 lbf (62 kN) with afterburner

Performance

- Maximum speed: Mach 2
- Range: 2,380 mi (3,830 km, 2,070 nmi)
- Service ceiling: 51,000 ft (16,000 m)

Armament

- Guns: 1 × 30mm cannon in tail

== See also ==
Aircraft of comparable role, configuration, and era

- B-58 Hustler

Related lists

- List of bomber aircraft
- List of military aircraft of the United States
