= Missing in action (disambiguation) =

Missing in action is the status of a missing member of the armed services.

Missing in action may also refer to:

- Missing in Action (film), a 1984 film starring Chuck Norris
  - Missing in Action 2: The Beginning, the 1985 prequel
  - Braddock: Missing in Action III, the 1988 sequel
- Missing in Action (video game), a 1989 game by Konami
- "Missing in Action" (Star Wars: The Clone Wars), a fifth-season episode of Star Wars: The Clone Wars
- Missing in Action (album), an album by Dale Bozzio
- "Missing in Action" (song), a 1952 single by Ernest Tubb

== See also ==
- POW/MIA
- Mia (disambiguation)
