= Convair B-58 Hustler =

Cold War-era American supersonic bomber

B-58 Hustler
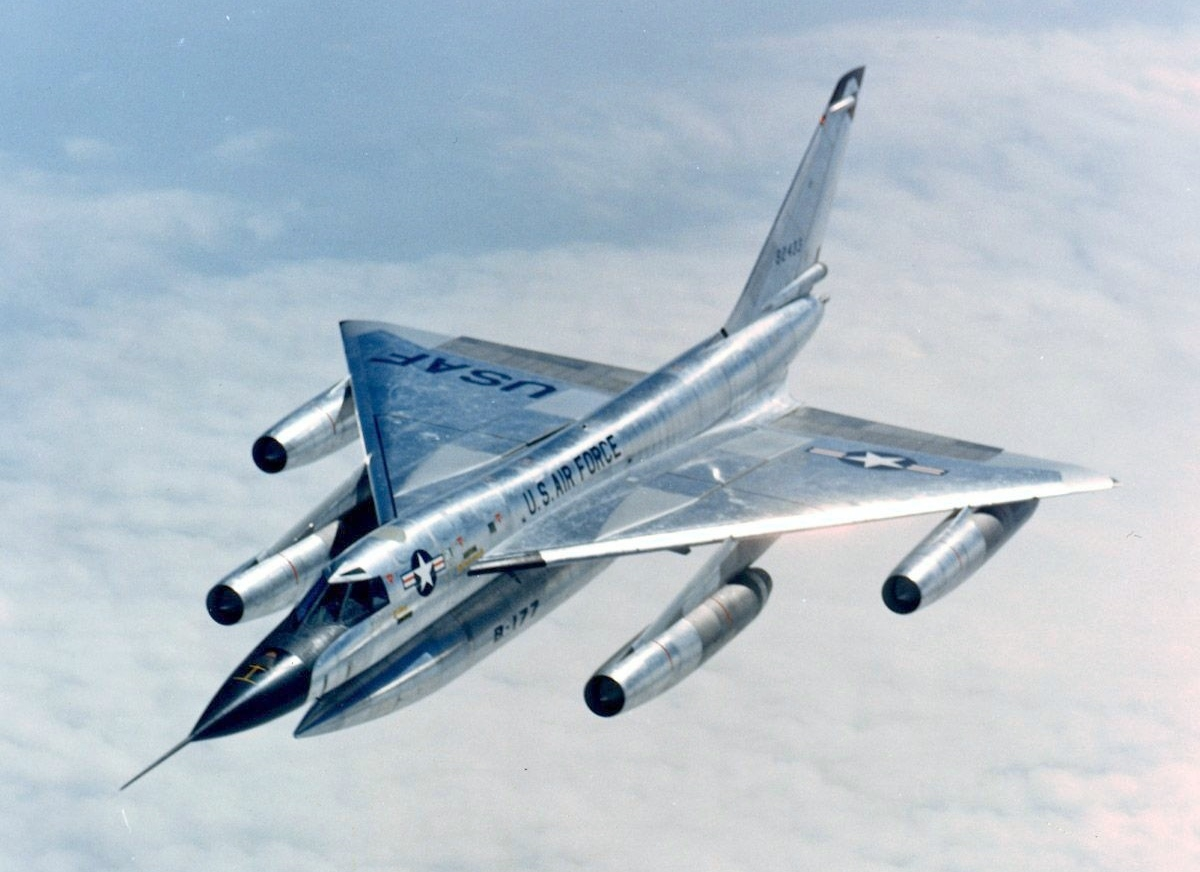
- Convair B-58 of the United States Air Force

General information
- Type: Supersonic strategic bomber
- National origin: United States
- Manufacturer: Convair/General Dynamics
- Status: Retired
- Primary user: United States Air Force
- Number built: 116

History
- Introduction date: 15 March 1960
- First flight: 11 November 1956
- Retired: 31 January 1970

The Convair B-58 Hustler is a supersonic strategic bomber, the first capable of Mach 2 flight. Designed and produced by American aircraft manufacturer Convair, a division of General Dynamics, the B-58 was developed during the 1950s for the United States Air Force (USAF) Strategic Air Command (SAC).

To achieve the high speeds desired, Convair chose a delta-wing design used by contemporary interceptors such as the Convair F-102. The bomber was powered by four General Electric J79 engines in underwing pods. It had no bomb bay; it carried a single nuclear weapon plus fuel in a combination bomb/fuel pod underneath the fuselage. Later, four external hardpoints were added, enabling it to carry up to five weapons such as one Mk 53 and four Mk 43 warheads.

The B-58 entered service in March 1960 and flew for a decade with two SAC bomb wings, the 43rd Bombardment Wing and the 305th Bombardment Wing. It was considered difficult to fly, imposing a high workload upon its three-man crews. Designed to replace the subsonic Boeing B-47 Stratojet strategic bomber, the B-58 became notorious for its sonic boom heard on the ground by the public as it passed overhead in supersonic flight.

The B-58 was designed to fly at high altitudes and supersonic speeds to avoid Soviet interceptors, but with the Soviet introduction of high-altitude surface-to-air missiles, the B-58 was forced to adopt a low-level penetration role that severely limited its range and strategic value. It was never used to deliver conventional bombs. The B-58 was substantially more expensive to operate than other bombers, such as the Boeing B-52 Stratofortress, and required more frequent aerial refueling. The B-58 also suffered from a high rate of accidental losses. These factors resulted in a relatively brief operational career of 10 years. The B-58 was succeeded in its role by the smaller, also problem-beset, swing-wing FB-111A.

== Development ==
=== Origins ===
The genesis of the B-58 was the Generalized Bomber Study (GEBO II) issued in February 1949 by the Air Research and Development Command (ARDC) at Wright-Patterson AFB, Ohio, for the development of a supersonic, long-range, manned bomber aircraft. ARDC sought the best attainable quantitative data, challenging the industry to devise their own solutions to attain the stated goal. Work on the proposed bomber's design was to begin less than two years after sustained supersonic flight had been achieved. According to aviation authors Bill Gunston and Peter Gilchrist, while some military officials were keenly interested in the prospective use of supersonic bombers, others held doubts about the propulsion systems and materials science required for supersonic operations, as well as the much higher fuel consumption relative to subsonic counterparts.

Despite the skepticism, multiple contractors submitted bids for GEBO II, which was viewed as an influential step towards a development contract. These included Boeing, Convair, Curtiss, Douglas, Martin, and North American Aviation. Most of the submissions were relatively straightforward, unambitious, and expensive. Convair, which had built the XF-92A and other delta-wing fighters, evaluated swept and semidelta configurations, then settled on the delta wing, which offered good internal volume for support systems and fuel. It also provided low wing loading for the airframe size, permitting supersonic flight in the midstratosphere at 50,000 to 70,000 ft (15,000 to 21,000 m). Most of the configurations studied mated the delta wing to a relatively slender fuselage housing a crew of two and powered by a pair of jet engines.

The Convair proposal, coded FZP-110, was a radical, two-place, delta-wing bomber powered by three General Electric J53 turbojet engines. The performance estimates included a 1,000 mph (1,600 km/h) speed and a 3,000-mile (4,800 km) range. A key feature of the design was to store consumables, both weaponry and most of the fuel, within a large external pod, which enabled a smaller fuselage. In January 1951, Convair submitted the FZP-110 proposal, which was received later than other competing bids. During December 1951, a revised FZP-016 proposal was submitted, which deleted the third engine on the tail, increased the remaining two engines' thrust, and added a third crew member to operate defensive systems.

=== Selection ===
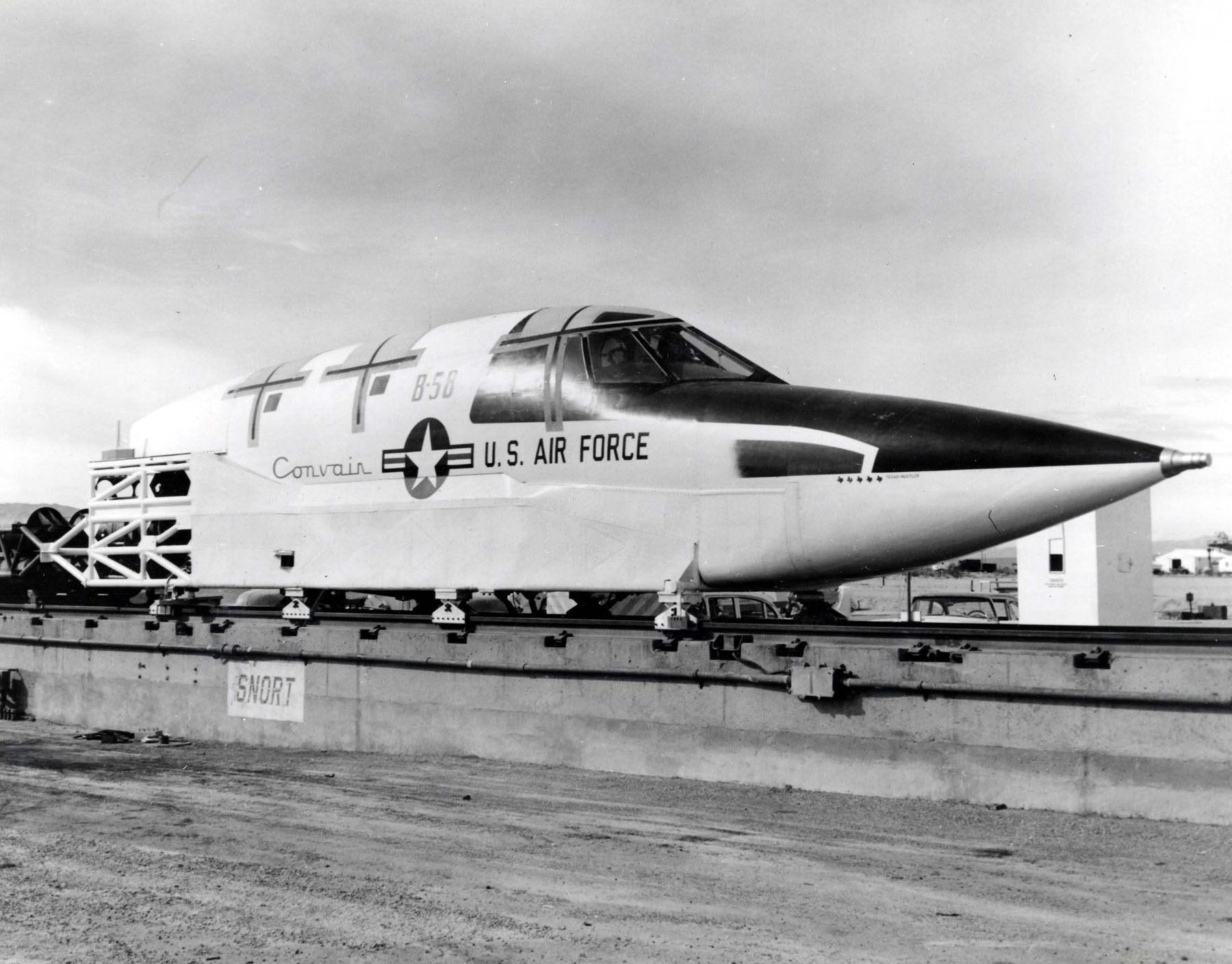
Ejection pod undergoing testing

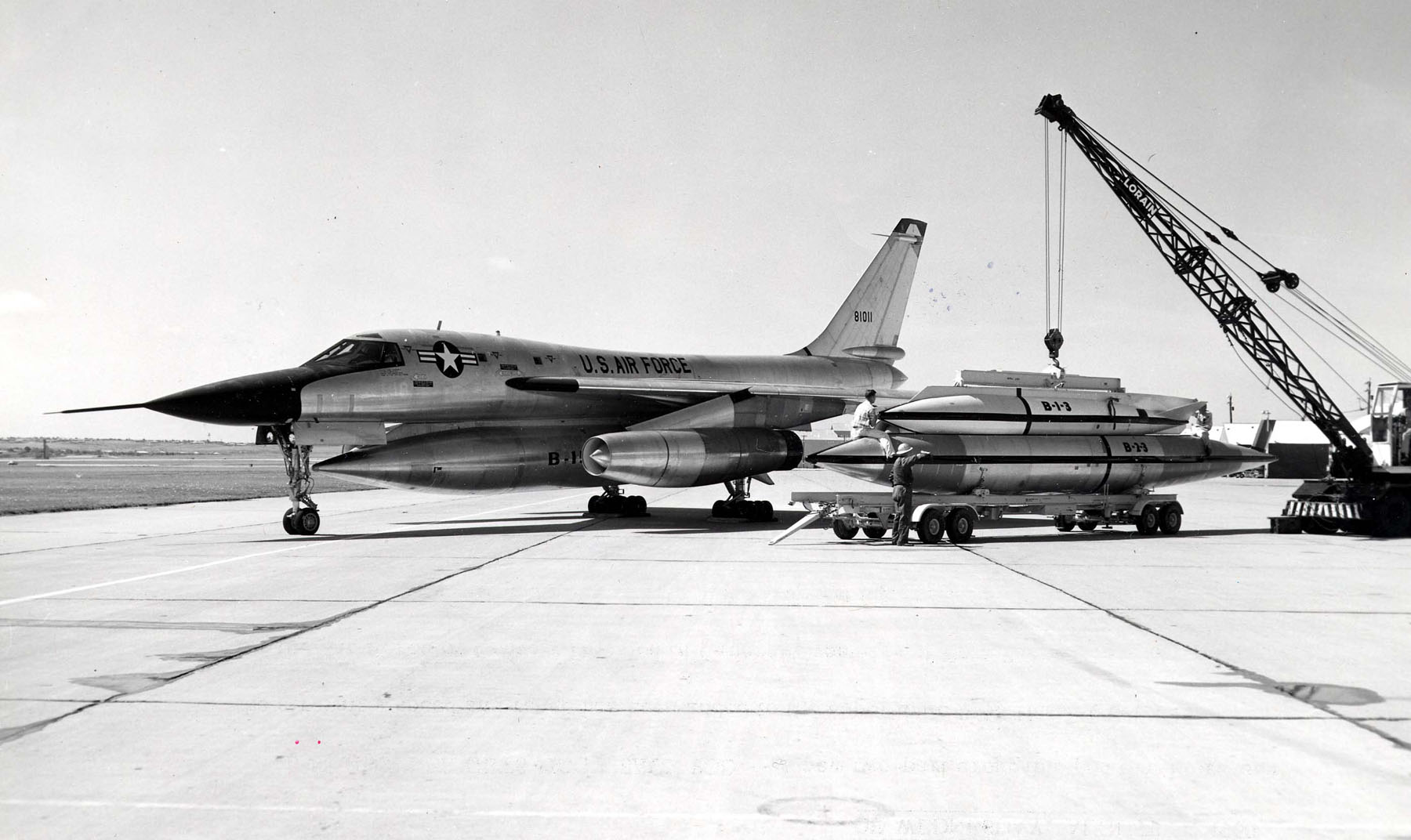
RB-58A with two component pod (TCP)

The USAF chose Boeing's MX-1712 and Convair MX-1626 design studies to proceed to a phase 1 study. During this period, Convair took advantage of recent developments by General Electric and replaced the two large J53 engines with four smaller J79s optimized for supersonic flight. The recently formulated area rule was also applied to the design, resulting in aerodynamic reprofiling and an even more slender fuselage. Having been refined, Convair redesignated their renewed submission MX-1964.

In August 1952, Convair's design was judged superior. According to Gunston and Gilchrist, Boeing's submission was viewed as equally good, but their separate contract to produce the Boeing B-52 Stratofortress had undoubtedly influenced this competition. In December 1952, Convair was chosen to meet the new SAB-51 (Supersonic Aircraft Bomber) and SAR-51 (Supersonic Aircraft Reconnaissance) standards, the first general operational requirements for supersonic bombers. In February 1953, the USAF issued a contract for Convair's design, designated B-58 on 10 December 1952.

The B-58 program, unlike those for prior military aircraft, was the first weapon-system contract. Under this arrangement, Convair acted as the prime contractor responsible for all program elements, not just the aircraft. Convair was required to devise or subcontract everything associated with the aircraft's operation, from the engines to training manuals, spare components, and software, in excess of one million items. Early on, the contract was modified to build a pair of XB-58 prototypes, 11 YB-58A preproduction aircraft, and 31 mission pods including a free-fall bomb pod, a rocket-propelled controllable bomb pod, a reconnaissance pod, and an electronic reconnaissance pod.

=== Into flight ===
The first prototype, serial number 55-660, was rolled out on 31 August 1956. The program was performed under high security; prior to the roll out, no unauthorized individual had knowledge of its shape or basic configuration. On 11 November 1956, the maiden flight occurred. The prototype exceeded Mach 1 for the first time on 30 December of that year. The difficult and protracted flight-test program involving 30 aircraft continued until April 1959. In total, 116 B-58s were produced - 30 trial aircraft and 86 production B-58A models. Most of the trial aircraft were later upgraded to operational standards. Eight were equipped as TB-58A training aircraft.

Convair sought further development of the B-58, proposing variants and derivatives for both military and civilian applications. Most never went beyond the drawing board, having been ordered prior to the decision to terminate multiple contracts. The B-58B, B-58C, B-58D, and B-58E variants were all terminated prior to completion of any production aircraft. During the late 1960s, some refinements to the existing fleet were developed and introduced, such as slender bomb racks (known as "multiple weapons capability") and additional pods. The final B-58 was delivered in October 1962.

== Design ==
=== Overview ===
"Tall-Man Five-Five" (1960) - Official USAF B-58 aircraft promotional film reel.

The Convair B-58 Hustler was a high-speed strategic bomber, capable of routinely attaining Mach 2 at altitude. It incorporated a large delta wing with a leading-edge sweep of 60°, and was powered by an arrangement of four General Electric J79-GE-1 turbojet engines. Although its sizable wing generated relatively low wing loading, it proved to be surprisingly well suited for low-altitude, high-speed flight. To protect against the heat generated while cruising at Mach 2, the crew compartment, wheel wells, and electronics bay were pressurized and air conditioned. The B-58 was one of the first extensive applications of aluminum honeycomb panels, which bonded outer and inner aluminum skins to a honeycomb of aluminum or fiberglass.

Various features of the B-58 were considered to be record-breaking, according to Gunston and Gilchrist. The structure itself made up 13.8% of the aircraft's gross weight, an exceptionally low figure for the era, while the wing was considered to be extremely thin. Several key features of the engine, including the nacelle and the inlet, were unlike any existing aircraft, having been devised from guidance by aerodynamicists. Specifically, the inlets used moving conical spikes, being fully aft on the ground and at low speeds to maximize air intake, then driven forward while being flown at high speeds to minimize the annular gap. This movement was automatically controlled, but significant noise and asymmetric thrust were generated in the event of a single inlet malfunctioning.

=== Crew provisions ===
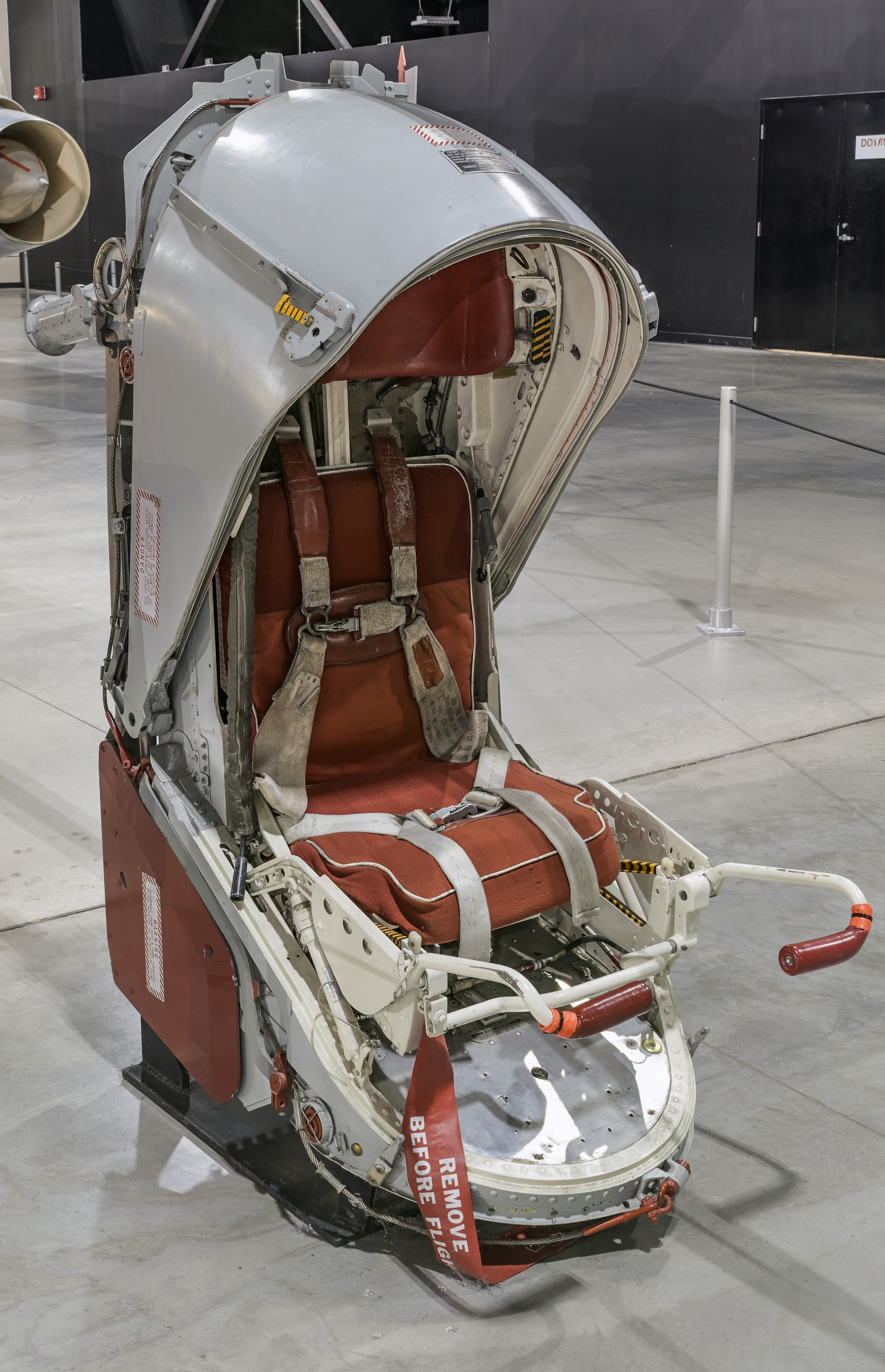
A crew-member escape pod from a Convair B-58 Hustler displayed in the open position

The B-58 was operated by a crew of three - pilot (the aircraft commander or "AC"), radar navigator/bombardier ("Nav"), and defense systems operator ("DSO"). They were seated in separated tandem cockpits. The AC's cockpit, which was provided with very deep windows, was considered to be mostly conventional for a large multiengine aircraft. The DSO was provisioned with a complex arrangement of different systems, which Gunston and Gilchrist describe as being the most complicated of any aircraft of the era. The space allocated to the crew, despite being roughly half of the fuselage's internal volume, was typically considered to be cramped and claustrophobic.

Later versions of the B-58 provided each crew member with a novel ejection capsule that could eject at an altitude of 70,000 ft (21,000 m) at speeds up to Mach 2. Unlike standard ejection seats of the period, a protective clamshell enclosed the seat and the control stick with an attached oxygen cylinder, allowing the AC to continue to fly even "turtled up" and ready for immediate egress. The capsule was buoyant; the crewmember could open the clamshell and use it as a life raft. Unusually, the ejection system was tested with live bears and chimpanzees; it was qualified for use during 1963. While occasionally written that one of these test bears became the first living being to survive a supersonic ejection, this is not the case; the first supersonic ejection was made in 1955 by George F. Smith from a North American F-100 Super Sabre.

The electronic controls were ambitious and advanced for the day. The Nav and DSO's cockpits featured wraparound dashboards with warning lights and buttons, and automatic voice messages and warnings from a tape system were audible through the helmet sets. Research during the era of all-male combat aircraft assignments revealed that a woman's voice was more likely to gain the attention of young men in distracting situations. Nortronics Division of Northrop Corporation selected actress and singer Joan Elms to record the automated voice warnings. To those flying the B-58, the voice was known as "Sexy Sally". The original voice recordings are archived.

=== Adverse flight characteristics ===
"Escape and Survive" (1960) Official USAF B-58 crew ejection and escape mechanism information film reel

While the B-58's performance and design were exceptional for the era, it was not an easy aircraft to fly. This was caused by the 60° leading-edge sweepback of its wing and was inherent in these types of delta wing platforms. It required a much higher angle of attack than a conventional aircraft, up to 9.4° at Mach 0.5 at low altitudes. If the angle of attack were too high, in excess of 17°, the bomber could pitch up and enter a spin. Several factors could prevent a successful recovery; if the pilot applied elevon, if the center of gravity was not correctly positioned, or if the spin occurred below 15,000 ft (4,600 m), recovery might not be possible. The B-58 also possessed unconventional stall characteristics; if the nose were elevated, the bomber maintained forward motion without pitching down. Unless large amounts of power were applied, the descent rate increased rapidly. Another problem pilots faced was called "fuel stacking", taking place whenever the B-58 accelerated or decelerated. It was caused by fuel movement within the tanks, which led to sudden changes in the aircraft's center of gravity. This could cause the B-58 to abruptly pitch or bank, potentially resulting in a loss of control.

The aircraft had unusual takeoff requirements, with a 14° angle of attack needed for the rotation near 203.5 knots (376.9 km/h; 234.2 mph) for a 150,000-pound (68,000 kg) combat weight. This poor takeoff performance was evident with the high landing speed, necessitating a drogue parachute for braking, which was also required for B-47 and B-52 aircraft. To accommodate the high landing speed, the specially configured landing gear had to handle excessive conditions; both the inflation pressure and wheel rotation speed were far greater than in prior units.

=== Weapons systems ===
The Sperry AN/ASQ-42 bombing/navigation system combined a sophisticated inertial navigation system with the KS-39 star tracker (astro-inertial navigation system) to provide a heading reference, the AN/APN-113 Doppler radar to provide ground speed and windspeed data, a search radar to provide range data for bomb release and trajectory, and a radar altimeter. The AN/ASQ-42 was estimated to be 10 times more accurate than any previous bombing/navigation system.

Defensive armament consisted of a single 20 mm (0.79 in) T-171E-3 rotary cannon with 1,200 rounds of ammunition in a radar-aimed tail barbette. It was remotely controlled through the Emerson MD-7 automated radar fire-control system, only requiring the DSO to lock on a selected target blip on his scope and then fire the gun. The system computed aiming, velocity, or heading differential, and range compensation. Offensive armament typically consisted of a single nuclear weapon, along with fuel tanks, in a streamlined MB-1C pod under the fuselage. Incurable difficulties with fuel leakage resulted in the replacement of the MB-1C with the two-component pod, which placed the nuclear weapon in an upper section, while the lower fuel component could be independently jettisoned. This had the added benefit of allowing the pilot to "clean up" the aircraft for fuel efficiency or in case of emergency.

From 1961 to 1963, the B-58 was retrofitted with two tandem stub pylons under each wing root, adjacent to the centerline pod, for B43 or B61 nuclear weapons. This allowed for a total of five nuclear weapons per aircraft. Although the USAF looked at using the B-58 for conventional strikes, it was never equipped for carrying or dropping conventional bombs. A photo reconnaissance pod, the LA-331, was also fielded. Several other specialized pods for electronic countermeasures or an early cruise missile were considered, but not adopted. The late-1950s High Virgo air-launched ballistic missile was designed to be launched from the B-58; a Hustler carried out four test launches to determine ballistic missile and antisatellite weapon-system capability.

== Operational history ==
=== Introduction ===
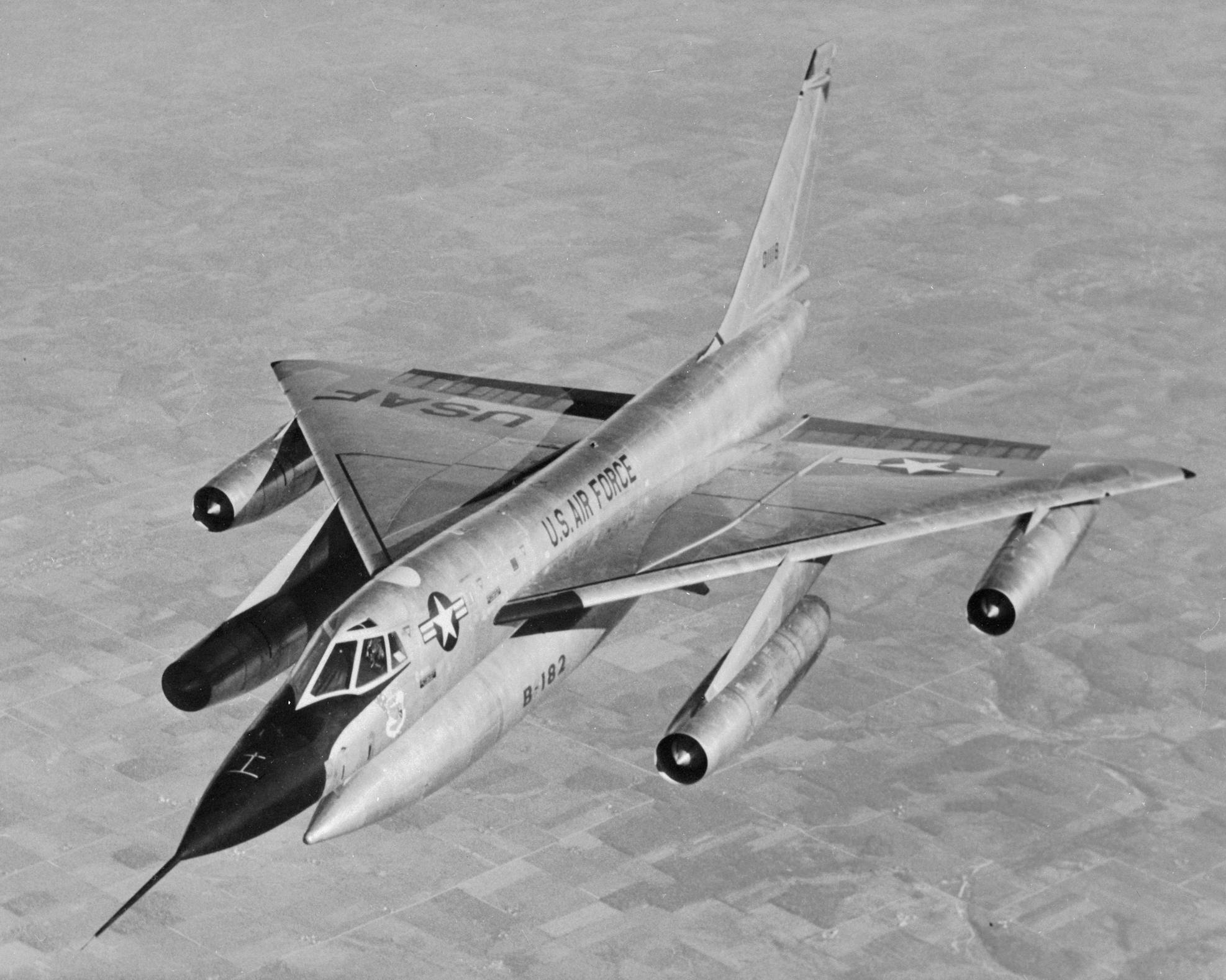
B-58A in flight

On 1 August 1960, the B-58 was declared operational, nine months after the delivery of the first aircraft to the USAF. One month later, a single B-58 participated in the annual SAC Combat Competition at Bergstrom Air Force Base; it proved itself to be superior to competing Boeing B-47 Stratojets and Boeing B-52 Stratofortresses, securing first place in both high-level and low-level radar bombing exercises.

Crews were typically chosen from other strategic bomber squadrons. Due to some characteristics of delta-winged aircraft, new pilots used the Convair F-102 Delta Dagger as a conversion trainer before moving to the TB-58A trainer. The B-58 was found to be difficult to fly, and its three-man crews were constantly busy, but its performance was exceptional. A lightly loaded Hustler could climb at nearly 46,000 ft/min (235 m/s).

=== Excessive program expenditure ===
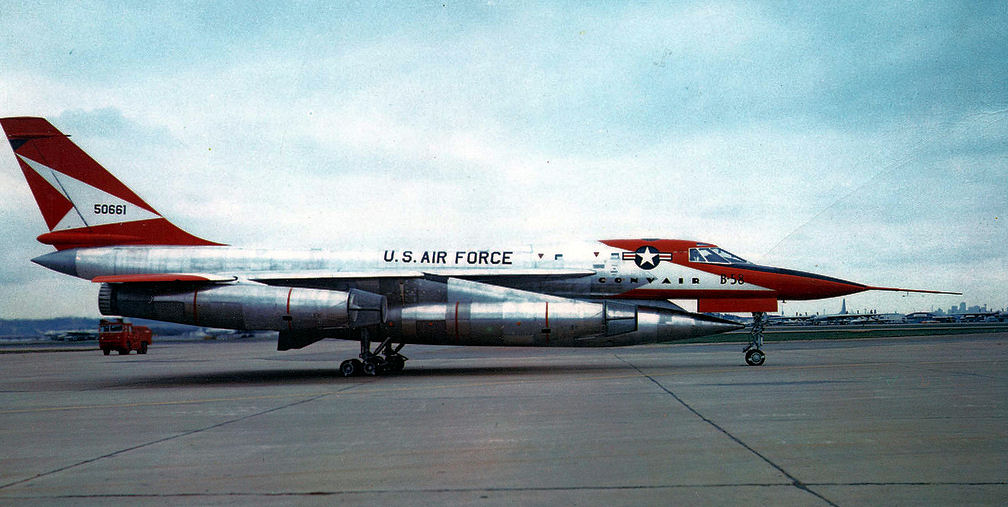
Convair YB-58A-1-CF Hustler (AF Ser. No. 55-0661), the second aircraft built

In addition to its much smaller weapons load and more limited range than the B-52, the B-58 had been extremely expensive to acquire, with a unit cost of US$12.44 million (equivalent to $103.13 million today). Through FY 1961, the total cost of the B-58 program was $3 billion ($25 billion in 2024 dollars). A highly complex aircraft, it also required considerable maintenance, much of which required specialized equipment and ground personnel. For comparison, the average maintenance cost per flying hour for the B-47 was $361, for the B-52 it was $1,025, and for the B-58 it was $1,440. The B-58 cost 40% more to operate than the B-52. The cost of maintaining and operating the two operational B-58 wings (39 aircraft per wing, for a total of 78 aircraft) equaled that of six wings of B-52s (15 aircraft per wing, equaling 90 aircraft). Because of the support costs of six wings vs. only two wings, the actual cost per aircraft of the B-52s was $1.42 million per year vs $1.21 million per year for the B-58 (this figure included special detailed maintenance for the nose landing gear, which retracted in a complex fashion to avoid the center payload).

Compounding these exorbitant costs, the B-58 had a high accident rate; 26 B-58 aircraft were lost in accidents, or 22.4% of total production, and more than half of the losses occurred during flight tests. The SAC senior leadership had been doubtful about the aircraft type from the beginning, although its crews eventually became enthusiastic about the aircraft. General Curtis LeMay was never satisfied with the bomber, and after a flight in one declared that it was too small, far too expensive to maintain in combat readiness, and required an excessive number of aerial refuelings to complete a mission. Although the high-altitude ferry range of the B-58 was better than that of the B-47, the lack of forward basing resulted in a requirement for more KC-135 tanker support.

=== Operational wings and retirement ===
Two SAC bomb wings operated the B-58 during its operational service - the 43rd Bombardment Wing (which later transitioned to the 43rd Airlift Wing), based at Carswell AFB, Texas, from 1960 to 1964, and Little Rock AFB, Arkansas, from 1964 to 1970; and the 305th Bombardment Wing, based at Bunker Hill AFB (later Grissom AFB), Indiana, from 1961 to 1970. The 305th also operated the B-58 combat crew training school, the predecessor of the USAF's formal training units.

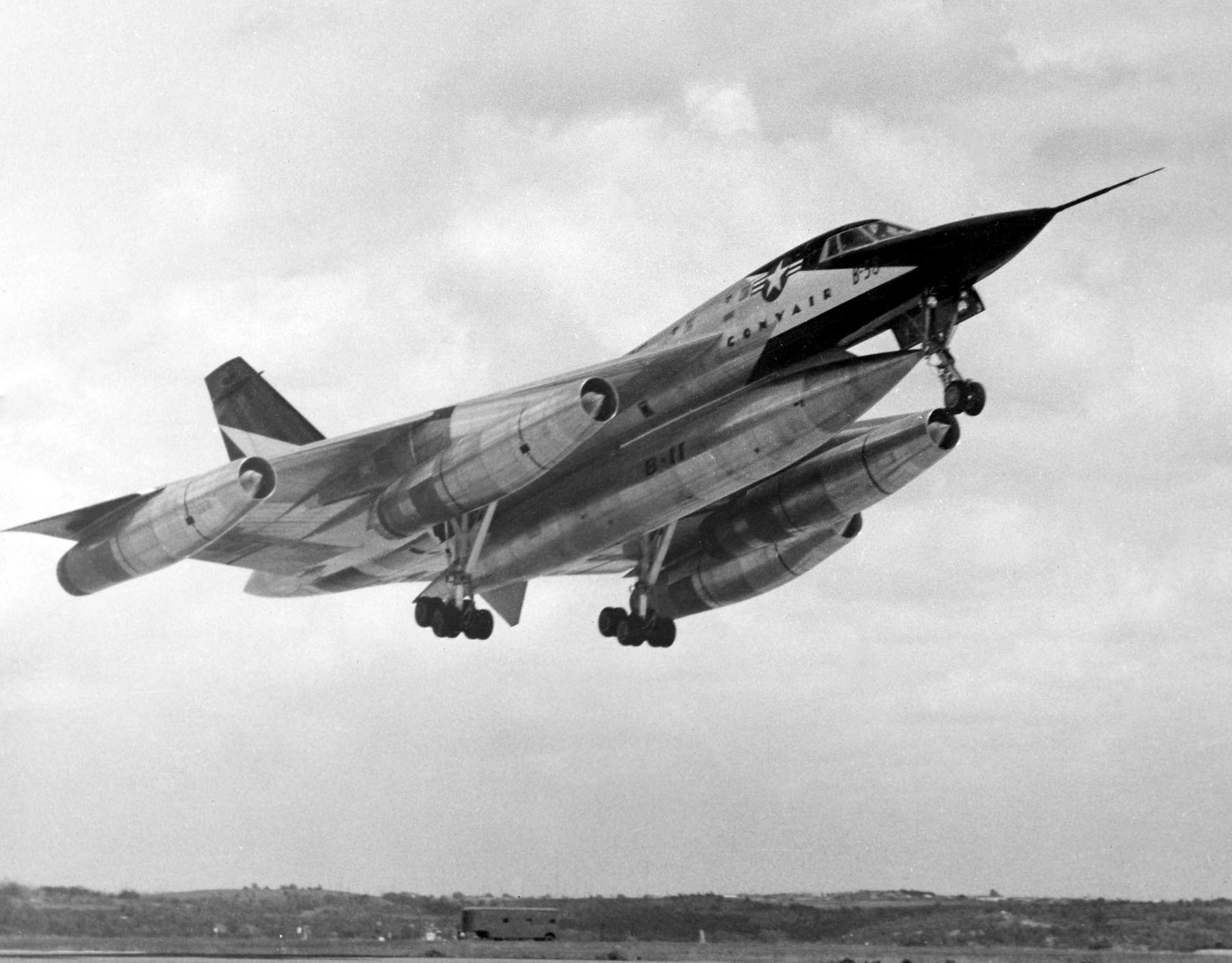
XB-58 prototype during takeoff

By the time the early problems had largely been resolved and SAC interest in the bomber had solidified, Secretary of Defense Robert McNamara decided that the B-58 was not a viable weapon system. During the B-58's introduction, high-altitude Soviet surface-to-air missiles became a threat, especially the S-75 Dvina (NATO reporting name SA-2 Guideline), a system the Soviet Union extensively deployed. The solution to this problem was to fly at low altitudes, out of the line-on-sight of the S-75s.

Because of dense air at low altitudes, the B-58 could not fly at supersonic speeds and its moderate range was reduced further, negating the costly high-speed performance of the aircraft. Despite shortcomings, the type had its advocates within the service; according to Gunston and Gilchrist, when Secretary McNamara had requested proposals for a new crewed Mach 2 bomber, General Thomas S. Power responded with a request for the B-58 to be put back into production. In late 1965, McNamara ordered retirement of the B-58 by 1970; the principal reason given for this directive was the high sustainment cost for the fleet. On 29 October 1969, the Department of Defense announced that the type would be withdrawn from service on 31 January 1970.

Despite efforts of some officials within the USAF to secure a reprieve, the phaseout proceeded on schedule. The last B-58s were retired in January 1970, after which they were placed into storage with the Military Aircraft Storage and Disposition Center at Davis-Monthan Air Force Base. The fleet survived intact until 1977, when nearly all remaining aircraft were sold to Southwestern Alloys for disposal. As a weapon system, the B-58 was replaced by the FB-111A. This aircraft was designed for low-altitude attack, to be more flexible with the carriage of conventional weapons, and less expensive to produce and maintain.

Since B-58 pilots were the only USAF pilots experienced in long-duration supersonic flight, several former Hustler crew members were selected by Colonel Douglas Nelson to fly the Lockheed SR-71 Blackbird at the start of that program.

=== Test aircraft ===
Several B-58s were used for special trials. One was specially modified to test the Hughes radar system intended for the Lockheed YF-12 interceptor and the North American F-108 Rapier, which had an extended nose to accommodate the radar and was nicknamed "Snoopy" (see Aircraft on Display). Several improved (and usually enlarged) variants, named B-58B and B-58C by the manufacturer, were proposed, but never built.

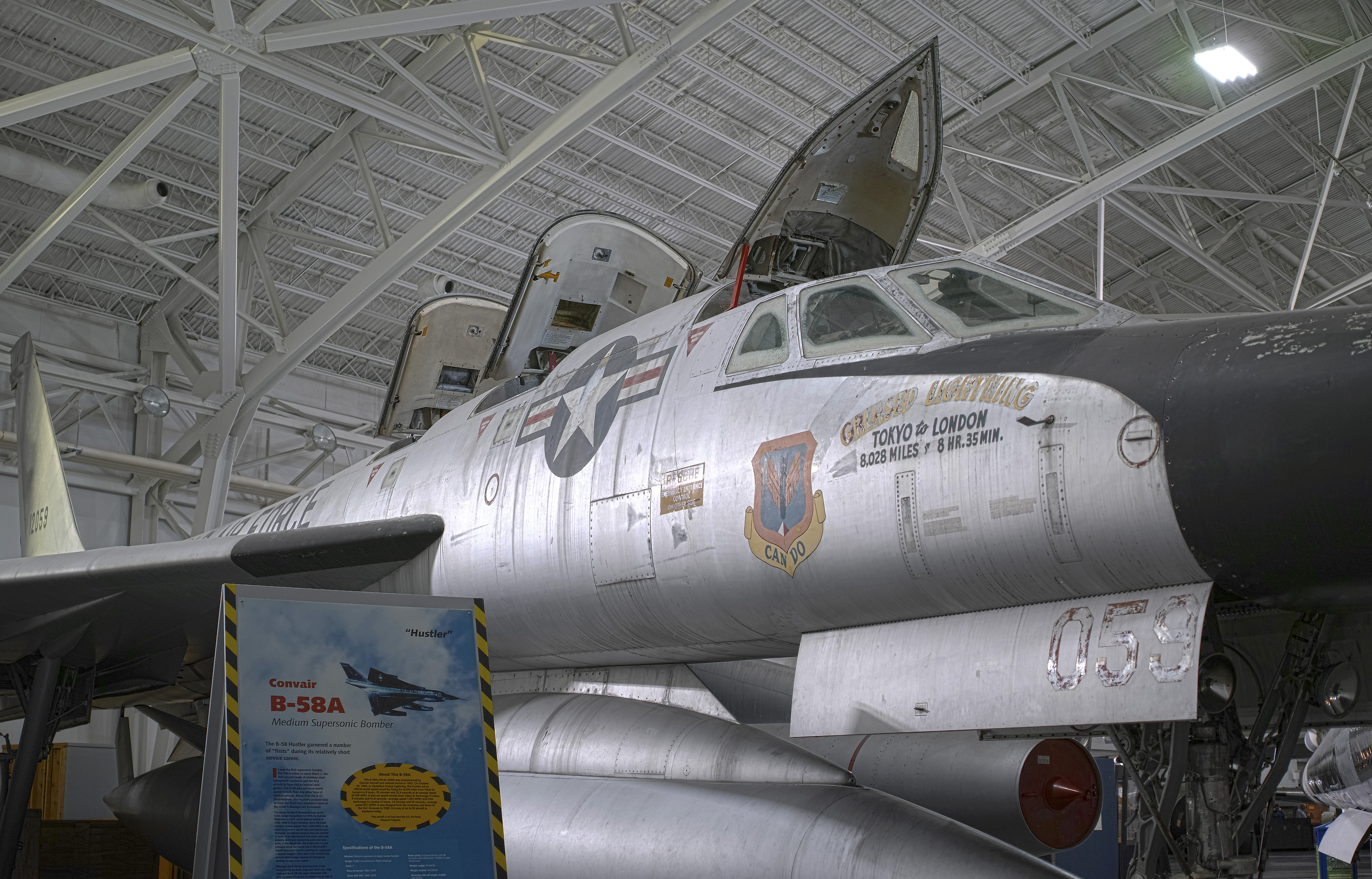
A 61-2059 (Greased Lightning) at the Strategic Air Command & Aerospace Museum near Ashland, Nebraska, averaged 938 kn flying 8,028 nmi from Tokyo to London in 8 hours and 35 minutes in October 1963. This photo shows the three crew hatches open.

=== World records ===
The B-58 set 19 speed records, including cross-US, and the longest supersonic flight in history. In 1963, it flew from Tokyo to London (via Alaska), a distance of 8,028 miles (12,920 km), with five aerial refuelings in 8 hours, 35 minutes, 20.4 seconds, averaging 938 mph (1,510 km/h). As of 2016, this record still stood. The aircraft was serving in an operational unit and had not been modified in any way besides being washed and waxed. One of the goals of the flight was to push the limit of its new honeycomb construction technique. The speed of the flight was limited only by the speed at which they believed the honeycomb panels would delaminate, although one of the afterburners malfunctioned and the last hour of the flight was continued at subsonic speed. This reduced the average speed to roughly Mach 1.5, despite most of the flight being at Mach 2. This B-58 was called Greased Lightning, which was the codename for the record attempt.

A B-58 set the FAI record for altitude with a 5,000 kg (11,000 lb) payload: 26,000 m (85,000 ft).

Some of the record-winning aerospace trophies the B-58 won were the Bleriot Trophy, the Thompson Trophy, the Mackay Trophy, the Bendix Trophy, and the Harmon Trophy.

Singer John Denver's father, Lieutenant Colonel Henry J. Deutschendorf, Sr., USAF, held several speed records as a B-58 pilot.

== Variants ==
- XB-58: Prototype; two built
- YB-58A: Pre-production aircraft; 11 built
- B-58A: Three-seat medium-range strategic bomber aircraft; 86 built
- TB-58A: Training aircraft, eight conversions from YB-58A
- NB-58A: This designation was given to a YB-58A used to test the General Electric J93 engine, originally intended for the North American XB-70 Valkyrie Mach 3 bomber.
- RB-58A: Variant with ventral reconnaissance pod; 17 built
- B-58B: Unbuilt. Larger and faster than the B-58A, this version would have had uprated J79-GE-9 engines, a longer fuselage for extra fuel capacity, canards, and the ability to carry conventional weapons. A prototype B-58B was ordered (S/N 60-1109) and a total purchase of 185 envisioned, but the entire project was canceled before construction began, due to budgetary considerations. The B variant was also planned to be the mothership for a Mach 4 parasite called the FISH, for First Invisible Super Hustler. That FISH had three ramjets that would be ignited at an altitude of at least 35,000 feet (11,000 metres) and speeds over Mach 2. The Super Hustler would then drop from the B-58B, climb to 90,000 feet (27,000 metres), and accelerate to Mach 4.2 to complete its mission.
- B-58C: Unbuilt. Proposed as a cheaper alternative to the XB-70, this enlarged version would have carried more fuel and 32,500 lbf (145 kN) J58 engines, the same ones used on the Lockheed SR-71. Design studies were conducted with two- and four-engine designs. Capable of carrying conventional weapons, the C model had an estimated top speed approaching Mach 3, a supercruise capability of about Mach 2, a service ceiling of about 70,000 ft (21,000 m), and a maximum range of 5,200 nautical miles (6,000 mi; 9,600 km). As enemy defenses against high-speed, high-altitude penetration bombers improved, the value of the B-58C diminished and the program was canceled in early 1961.
- B-58D: Unbuilt. Proposed as an interceptor aircraft, taking advantage of its speed and high altitude performance.
- B-58E: Unbuilt. Proposed as a multi-mission platform, to have been armed with numerous air-launched ballistic missiles (ALBM).

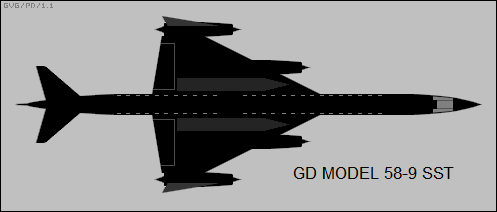
Proposed Model 58-9

- Model 58-9: a proposed supersonic transport. First developed by Convair in 1961, it was intended to carry 58 passengers at speed in excess of Mach 2. Multiple revisions of this proposal were submitted to Congress as Convair's bid for the National Supersonic Transport program. The Model 58-9 would use the wing design of the B-58C, which would be mated to an entirely new fuselage and tail; the airliner's cabin would be capable of seating as many as 52 passengers. The Model 58-9 was expected to have a maximum take-off weight of 190,000 pounds (86,000 kg), and would have a range of 2,500 nautical miles (4,600 km; 2,900 mi) at a cruising speed of Mach 2.4.

== Operators ==
United States

- United States Air Force
  - 43rd Bombardment Wing – Carswell AFB, Texas (1960–1964); Little Rock AFB, Arkansas (1964–1970)
    - 63rd Bombardment Squadron, Medium
    - 64th Bombardment Squadron, Medium
    - 65th Bombardment Squadron, Medium
    - 6592nd Test Squadron
    - 3958th Operational Test and Evaluation Squadron (1958–1960)
  - 305th Bombardment Wing – Bunker Hill (later Grissom AFB), Indiana (1961–1970)
    - 364th Bombardment Squadron, Medium
    - 365th Bombardment Squadron, Medium
    - 366th Bombardment Squadron, Medium
  - Air Force Flight Test Center – Edwards AFB, California (1956–1958)

== Accidents and incidents ==
Out of 116 B-58 Hustlers produced, 24 were lost in crashes. This represents a loss rate of approximately 21% of the total number produced.

On 27 October 1959, a B-58 was being flown from Carswell Air Force Base near Fort Worth, Texas, to Eglin Air Force Base in Florida. Three civilian crew members were aboard: the pilot, Everette Wheeler, and two flight engineers, Michael Keller and Harry Blosser. At about 7:30 p.m., the plane was flying at about 25,000 feet (7,600 m) when it developed a problem, and all three crew members ejected from the plane. Keller and Wheeler both landed safely, though Wheeler suffered a broken arm, but Blosser didn't survive. His body was found early the next morning in a field, still strapped into his ejection seat and the parachute open. The plane crashed in Mississippi, on a field in Lake Shady (today Lake Serene) about 2 mi (3 km) south of U.S. Route 98, leaving a crater 30 ft (10 m) deep and 75 ft (20 m) wide. After the crash, between 30 and 40 Air Force personnel were sent to investigate. They set up a temporary headquarters in the Oak Grove School auditorium. Anyone who found wreckage was asked to turn it in.

On 22 April 1960, a B-58 crashed into Great Salt Lake, Utah. Only the DSO (Defensive System Operator) survived.

On 3 June 1961, B-58A 59-2451 The Firefly crashed near the Paris Air Show, killing all three on board. The aircraft had, only eight days earlier and with a different crew, made a supersonic transatlantic crossing between Washington, D.C. and Paris in a Fédération Aéronautique Internationale (FAI) World Record Speed of 1,687.69 kilometers per hour (1,048.68 miles per hour) in 3 hours, 39 minutes, 49 seconds.

In September 1961, a B-58 on training flight from Carswell Air Force Base suffered a fire and failure of the left main gear. A chase aircraft was sent to examine the aircraft in flight. Through the night, eight sessions of aerial refuelling were conducted, using an improved technique and, once daylight broke, a successful emergency landing was made at Edwards Air Force Base. The Air Force made a training film about the incident, including a film of the landing.

On 8 December 1964, a B-58 carrying nuclear weapons slid off an icy runway on Bunker Hill Air Force Base in Bunker Hill, Indiana and caught fire during a training drill. The pilot and DSO escaped by jumping into the snow. The navigator ejected via the escape pod and landed over 500 feet away, but he did not survive. The five nuclear weapons on board were burned, including one 9-megaton thermonuclear weapon, causing radioactive contamination of the crash area.

On 15 June 1965, at the Paris Air Show, Lieutenant Colonel Charles D. Tubbs was killed and two other crewmen injured when their B-58 crashed. The aircraft landed short of the runway, struck the instrument approach beacons, and burst into flames.

On 22 July 1965, B-58 #60-1128 departed runway during landing and was destroyed. All three occupants were unharmed.

On 12 December 1966, a B-58 crashed in field near McKinney, Kentucky killing all three crew members.

On 14 June 1967, a B-58 was abandoned in flight. Three crew members ejected and one of them was killed when his parachute did not open.

On 3 April 1969, a B-58 crashed near Rokeby, Nebraska. The aircraft's left wing was torn off before crashing. All three crew members managed to eject and parachute to safety.

On 18 April 1969, B-58A #61-2056 crashed in field near Danville, Illinois. All three occupants were able to eject and parachute to safety.

== Aircraft on display ==
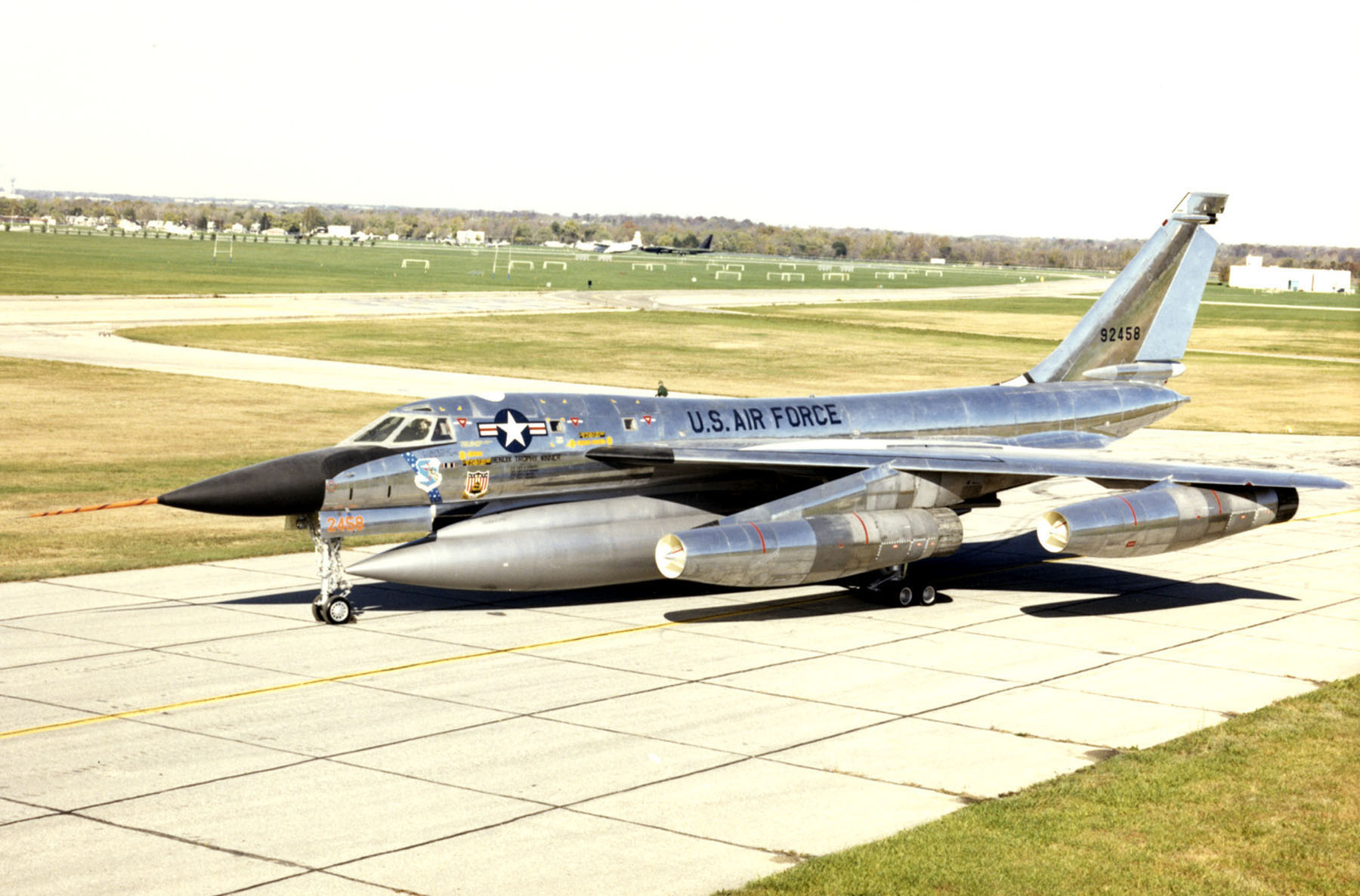
B-58A Hustler (AF Serial No. 59-2458), the "Cowtown Hustler," in front of the National Museum of the United States Air Force's restoration facility at Wright-Patterson AFB, Ohio

Today there are eight B-58 survivors:

TB-58A

- 55-0663 – Grissom Air Museum, Grissom Air Reserve Base (former Bunker Hill AFB / former Grissom AFB), Peru, Indiana. This is the oldest remaining aircraft and the fourth B-58 built.
- 55-0668 – Little Rock Air Force Base in Jacksonville, Arkansas. This is the only B-58 to fly a combat mission, a reconnaissance mission over Cuba during the Cuban Missile Crisis on October 30, 1962.

B-58A

- 55-0665 Snoopy – Edwards Air Force Base, California, 34.816163°N 117.863709°W. Built as a YB-58A, later redesignated B-58A. This aircraft sits derelict as a photo target on Edwards AFB's photo range.
- 55-0666 – Built as a YB-58A, later redesignated B-58A. Under restoration at Castle Air Museum at the former Castle Air Force Base in Atwater, California. Formerly on display at the former Chanute Air Force Base and then at the former Octave Chanute Aerospace Museum, Rantoul, Illinois.
- 59-2437 Firefly II – Lackland AFB/Kelly Field Annex (former Kelly Air Force Base), San Antonio, Texas.
- 59-2458 Cowtown Hustler – National Museum of the United States Air Force, Wright-Patterson Air Force Base, Dayton, Ohio. This aircraft flew from Los Angeles to New York City and back on 5 March 1962, setting three separate speed records, and earning the crew the Bendix Trophy and the Mackay Trophy for 1962. The aircraft was flown to the Museum on 1 March 1969. The aircraft is on display in the Museum's Cold War gallery.
- 61-2059 Greased Lightning – Strategic Air Command & Aerospace Museum near Ashland, Nebraska. It averaged 938 nmph flying 8,028 nmi. from Tokyo to London in 8 hours and 35 minutes in October 1963.
- 61-2080 – Pima Air & Space Museum, adjacent to Davis-Monthan Air Force Base, in Tucson, Arizona. It was the last B-58 to be delivered.

== Specifications (B-58A) ==
3-view line drawing of the Convair B-58 Hustler

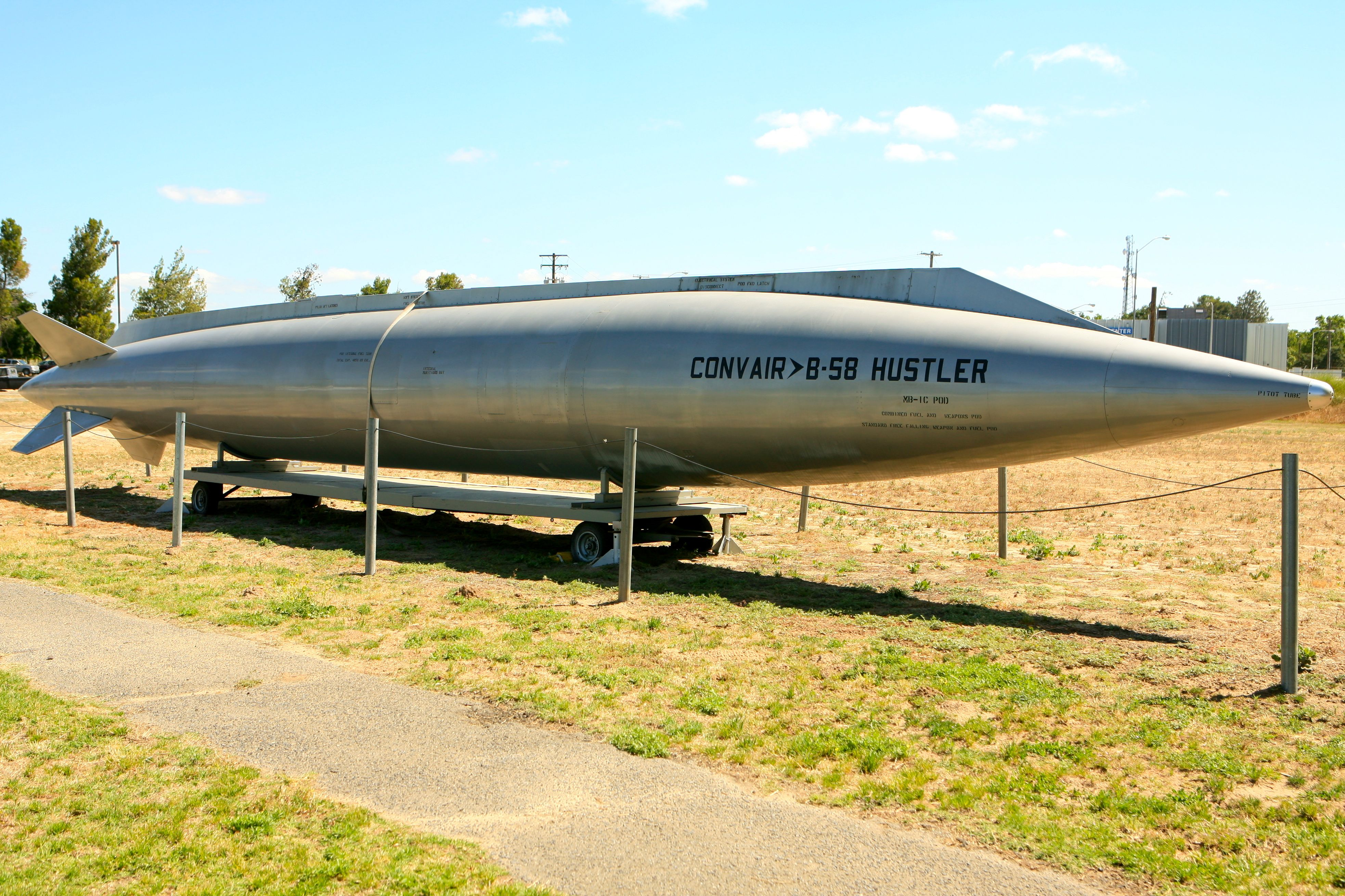
MB-1C original combined expendable underbelly fuel and weapon pod

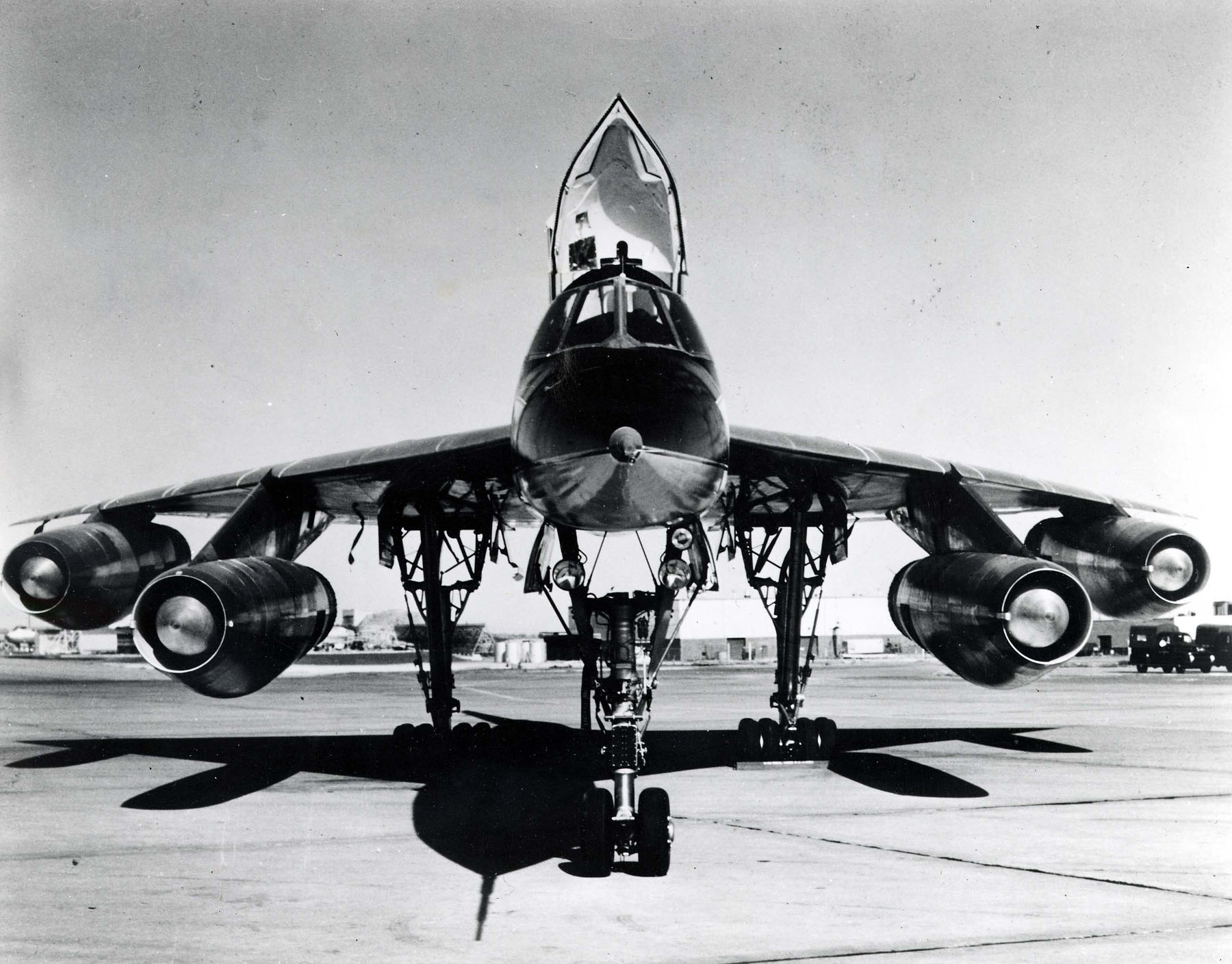
A front view of the B-58A in the "clean" configuration

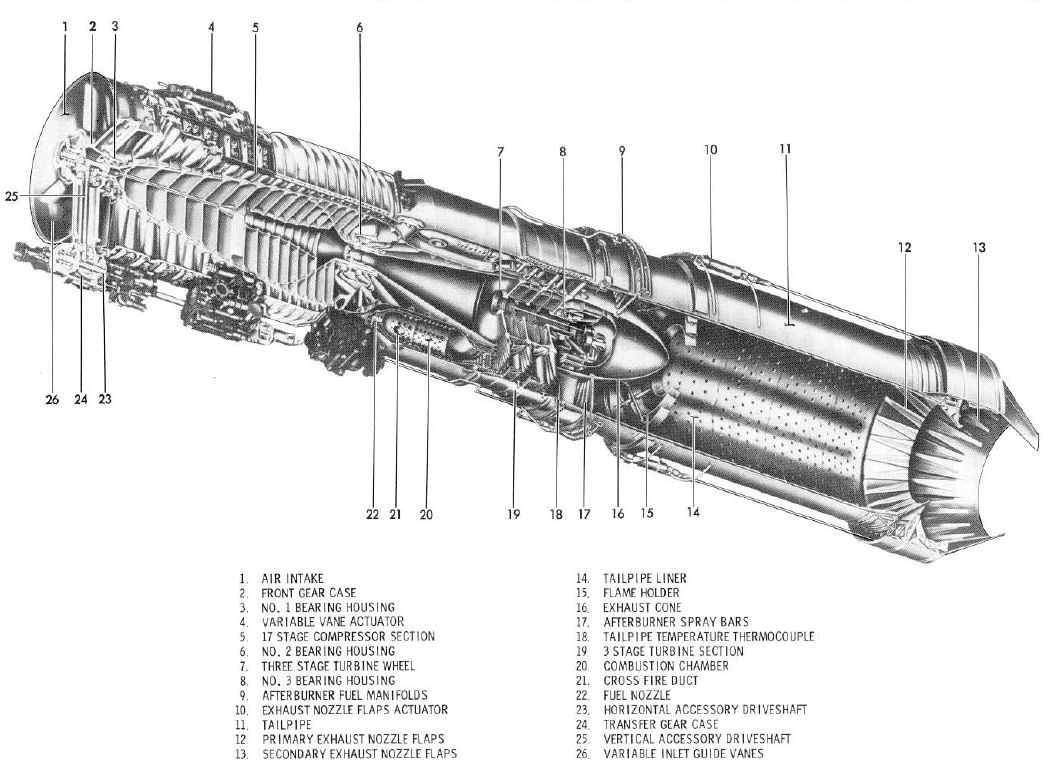
Cutaway diagram of the J79 with components labeled

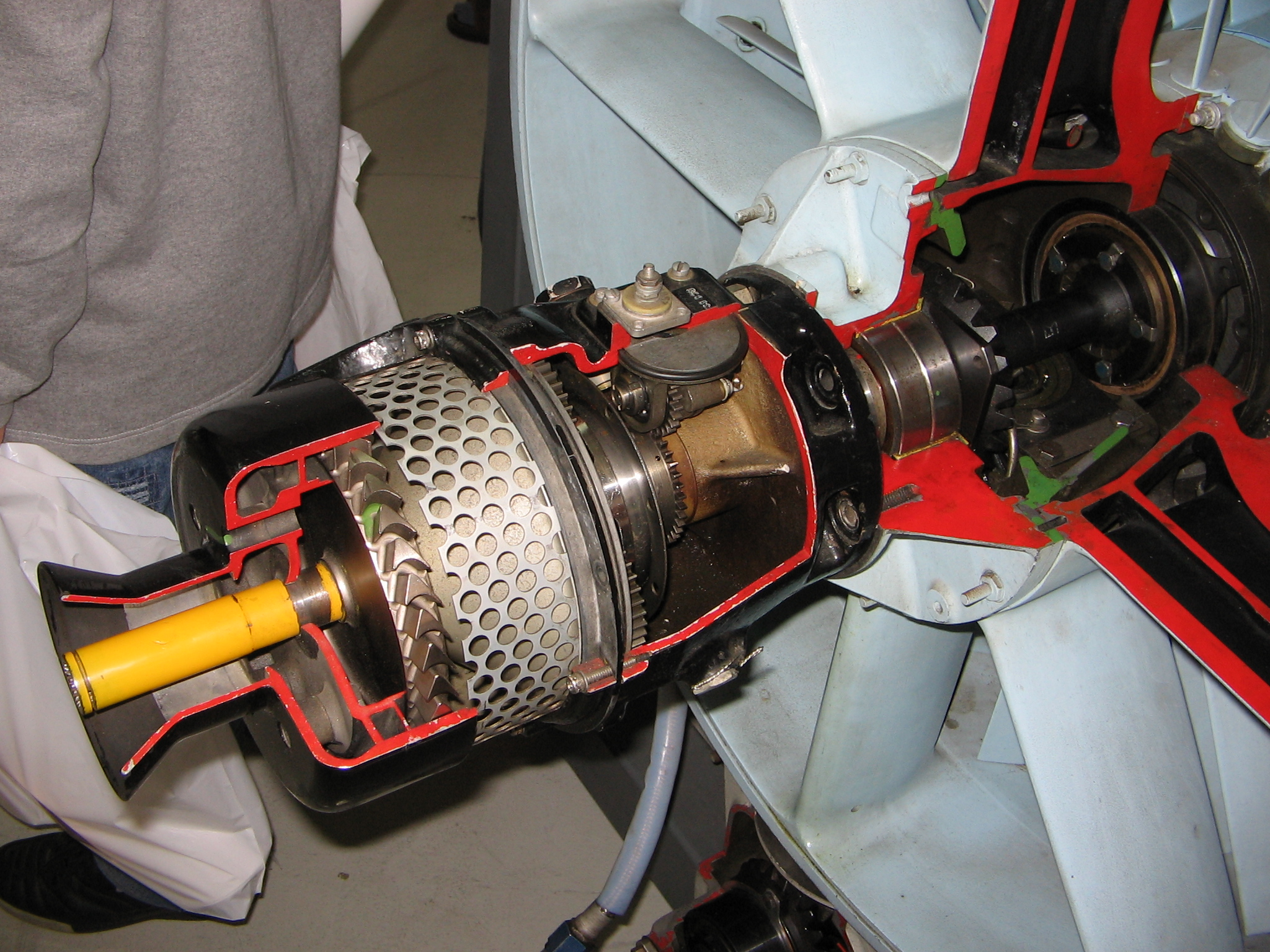
Cutaway of an air start system of a General Electric J79 turbojet. The small turbine and epicyclic gearing are clearly visible.

Data from Quest for Performance

General characteristics

- Crew: Three
- Length: 96 ft 10 in (29.51 m)
- Wingspan: 56 ft 9 in (17.30 m)
- Height: 29 ft 11 in (9.12 m)
- Wing area: 1,542 sq ft (143.3 m^{2})
- Aspect ratio: 2.09
- Airfoil: root: NACA 0003.46; tip: NACA 0004.08
- Empty weight: 55,560 lb (25,202 kg)
- Gross weight: 67,871 lb (30,786 kg)
- Max takeoff weight: 176,890 lb (80,236 kg)
- Zero-lift drag coefficient: C_{D}0.0068
- Frontal area: 10.49 sq ft (0.975 m^{2})
- Powerplant: 4 × General Electric J79-GE-5A afterburning turbojet, 10,400 lbf (46 kN) thrust each dry, 15,000 lbf (67 kN) with afterburner

Performance

- Maximum speed: 1,146 kn (1,319 mph, 2,122 km/h) at 40,000 ft (12,000 m)
- Maximum speed: Mach 2.0
- Cruise speed: 530 kn (610 mph, 980 km/h)
- Range: 4,100 nmi (4,700 mi, 7,600 km)
- Combat range: 1,740 nmi (2,000 mi, 3,220 km)
- Service ceiling: 63,400 ft (19,300 m)
- Rate of climb: 17,400 ft/min (88 m/s) at gross weight
- Lift-to-drag: 11.3 (subsonic, "clean configuration")
- Wing loading: 44 lb/sq ft (210 kg/m^{2})
- Thrust/weight: 0.919

Armament

- Guns: 1× 20 mm T171 cannon
- Bombs: 1× Mark 39 or B53 or 4× B43 or B61 nuclear bombs; maximum weapons load was 19,450 pounds (8,820 kg)

Avionics

- AN/APB-2 Bombing radar
- AN/APN-110 Doppler navigational radar (part of Sperry AN/ASQ-42 Navigation & Bombing System)
- AN/APN-170 Terrain-following radar
- AN/APR-12 Radar warning receiver
- Hughes Aircraft AN/APQ-69 podded Side looking airborne radar (mounted on RB-58A)
- Goodyear AN/APS-73 podded synthetic aperture radar (mounted on RB-58A)

== Notable appearances in media ==
Jimmy Stewart, a bomber pilot during World War II and a brigadier general in the Air Force Reserve, appeared in the Air Force documentary film B-58 Champion of Champions. In the film, Stewart flew in the back seat of the B-58 on a typical low-altitude attack.

In the film Fail Safe, the attack on Moscow is made by a squadron of "Vindicator" bombers, fictitious aircraft. While exterior shots of the plane relied on footage of B-58s, interior shots depicted a three-man crew, similar to that of a conventional airliner, and distinct from the tandem seating on a real B-58. The fictional Vindicator bomber was again represented by the B-58 in Fail Safe, a 2000 made-for-TV remake starring George Clooney.

Model kits from the 1960s of the B-58 from Aurora & Revell were modified and used/partially used in the Anderson science fiction television series Fireball XL5, Stingray and Thunderbirds as spacecraft or futuristic aircraft.

== See also ==
- CORDIC algorithm (a digital resolver for Convair's navigation computers CORDIC I and II)
- High Virgo
- Wagtail (missile)

Related development

- Convair Model 58-9

Aircraft of comparable role, configuration, and era

- BAC TSR-2
- Boeing XB-59
- Dassault Mirage IV
- Myasishchev M-50
- Tupolev Tu-22 'Blinder'

Related lists

- List of bomber aircraft
- List of military aircraft of the United States
