= Richard A. Knobloch =

United States Air Force general

Richard August Knobloch
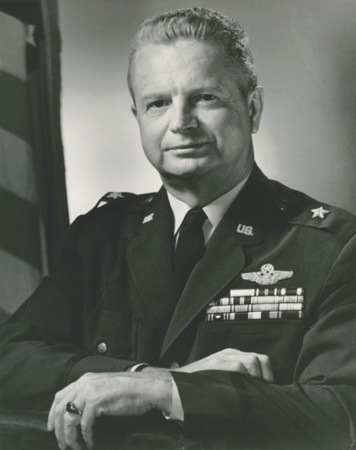
- Born: May 27, 1918; West Allis, Wisconsin, U.S.
- Died: August 13, 2001 (aged 83); San Antonio, Texas, U.S.
- Burial place: Fort Sam Houston National Cemetery
- Military career
- Allegiance: United States
- Branch: United States Air Force
- Service years: 1940–1970
- Rank: Brigadier General
- Nickname: Knobby
- Units: 37th Bomb Squadron; 491st Bombardment Squadron
- Commands: 363rd Tactical Reconnaissance Wing; Andrews Air Force Base
- Conflicts: World War II; Vietnam War
- Awards: Air Force Distinguished Service Medal; Legion of Merit (2); Distinguished Flying Cross (2); Air Medal

Richard August Knobloch (27 May 1918 – 13 August 2001) was a brigadier general in the United States Air Force.

== Biography ==
Knobloch was born in West Allis, Wisconsin, United States, in 1918. Later he would move to Milwaukee, Wisconsin. He attended the University of Wisconsin until 1940 when he interrupted his studies to become an aviation cadet in the U.S. Army Air Corps. Following the end of World War II, he attended Kansas State College under military auspices, graduating with a BS degree in agriculture in June 1947. Knobloch died on August 13, 2001.

== Career ==
Knobloch joined the United States Army Air Corps in 1940, which became the United States Army Air Forces the following year.

=== Wartime ===
During World War II he participated in the Doolittle Raid. A member of the 17th Bombardment Group, he trained at Columbia Army Air Base, South Carolina, and Eglin Field, Florida, for the raid on the Japanese homeland. He flew as the co-pilot of Crew 13, in B-25B Mitchell, AAF Ser. No. 40-2247, which bombed Yokosuka. The crew bailed out successfully near Poyang, China, within three miles of Japanese forces, but were not detected. Taken to Poyang by Chinese soldiers, they were recovered by way of Poyang Lake, Zhuzhou, bused to Hengyang and flown to Chongqing.

A delayed report from "a U.S. air base in northern India", carried by United Press on 2 October 1942, described the destruction of a strategic railway bridge in northwestern Burma by a "twin-engined American bomber", cutting the single Japanese line of communication to bases in that area.

The pilot, Lieut. Richard (Nobby) Knobloch [sic], of Fort Sheridan, Ill., dived the plane almost to the top of the bridge before the Bombardier Liet. Robert Sikes, of Breckenridge, Texas, released delayed action bombs which Knobloch [sic] said 'blew 'em to smithereens.'

=== Post-war ===
Following the war, he completed his bachelor's degree while on active duty and was subsequently assigned to 12th Air Force at March Field, California as Deputy Assistant Chief, Magterial. He transitioned to the U.S. Air Force in 1947 following its establishment as a separate service. He was later assigned to the Ninth Air Force and became Vice Commander of the 363d Tactical Reconnaissance Wing.

In 1957, he was assigned as the air attaché to the American Embassy in Rome, Italy. He returned to Washington in August 1960 for a year's postgraduate study at the Industrial College of the Armed Forces at Fort McNair, Virginia. Following completion of his studies he served at The Pentagon, assigned to Headquarters, U.S. Air Force with the Deputy Chief of Staff, Plans and then as Chief, Officers Assignment Division, Deputy Chief of Staff, Personnel.

Knobloch served as Deputy Commander, U.S. Air Force Military Personnel Center at Randolph Air Force Base, Texas. He served as Deputy Chief of Staff, Personnel at Headquarters, Pacific Air Forces at Hickam AFB, Hawaii from June 1965 until September 1967, when he became PACAF's Deputy Chief of Staff, Plans.

In 1960 he entered the Industrial College of the Armed Forces. Later assignments include serving as Deputy Chief of Staff of Plans of Pacific Air Forces. A USAF Command Pilot with over 4,200 flight hours, his retirement was effective as of 1 February 1970.

== Awards ==
Awards he received include the Air Force Distinguished Service Medal, the Legion of Merit, the Distinguished Flying Cross with oak leaf cluster, the Air Medal, and the Air Force Commendation Medal.

US Air Force Command Pilot Badge
Air Force Distinguished Service Medal
Legion of Merit with bronze oak leaf cluster	Distinguished Flying Cross with bronze oak leaf cluster	Air Medal
Air Force Commendation Medal	Air Force Outstanding Unit Award	American Defense Service Medal
American Campaign Medal	Asiatic-Pacific Campaign Medal with three bronze campaign stars	World War II Victory Medal
National Defense Service Medal with service star	Vietnam Service Medal with bronze campaign star	Air Force Longevity Service Award with silver and bronze oak leaf clusters
Small Arms Expert Marksmanship Ribbon	Republic of China Medal of the Armed Forces; A-1	Military Order of Italy; 5th class
Republic of China War Memorial Medal	Republic of Vietnam Gallantry Cross Unit Citation	Vietnam Campaign Medal

His Distinguished Flying Cross citation reads:

The President of the United States of America, authorized by Act of Congress, July 2, 1926, takes pleasure in presenting the Distinguished Flying Cross to First Lieutenant (Air Corps) Richard A. Knobloch, United States Army Air Forces, for extraordinary achievement as Co-Pilot of a B-25 Bomber of the 1st Special Aviation Project (Doolittle Raider Force), while participating in a highly destructive raid on the Japanese mainland on 18 April 1942. Lieutenant Knobloch with 79 other officers and enlisted men volunteered for this mission knowing full well that the chances of survival were extremely remote, and executed his part in it with great skill and daring. This achievement reflects high credit on himself and the military service.
