= Charles Ross Greening =

American pilot and artist (1914–1957)

Colonel Charles Ross Greening
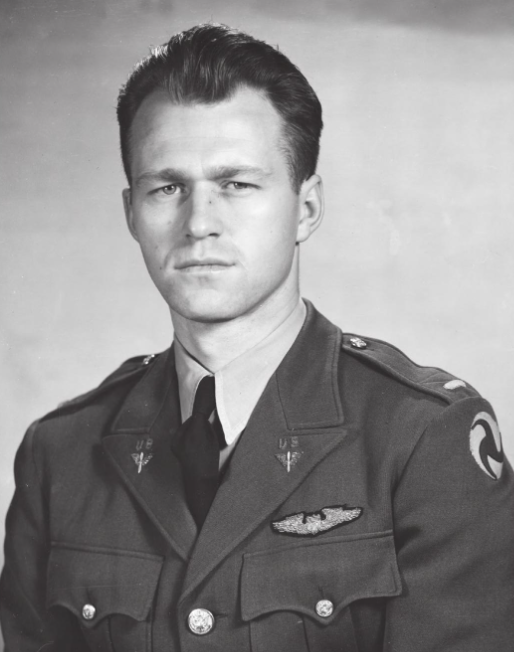
- Born: November 12, 1914; Carroll, Iowa
- Died: March 29, 1957 (aged 42); Bethesda, Maryland
- Burial place: Arlington National Cemetery
- Spouse: Dorothy Greening
- Military career
- Allegiance: United States
- Branch: U.S. Army Air Force; U.S. Air Force
- Service years: 1936–1957
- Rank: Colonel
- Unit: 17th Bomb Group
- Commands: 17th Bomb Group; 91st Strategic Reconnaissance Group
- Notable missions: World War II: Doolittle Raid
- Awards: Silver Star; Distinguished Flying Cross; Purple Heart; Air Medal (5)

Colonel Charles Ross Greening (November 12, 1914 – March 29, 1957) was an accomplished pilot and artist. He was one of the 73 men out of the 80 Doolittle Raiders to survive the attack and return home to his family.

== Early years and education ==
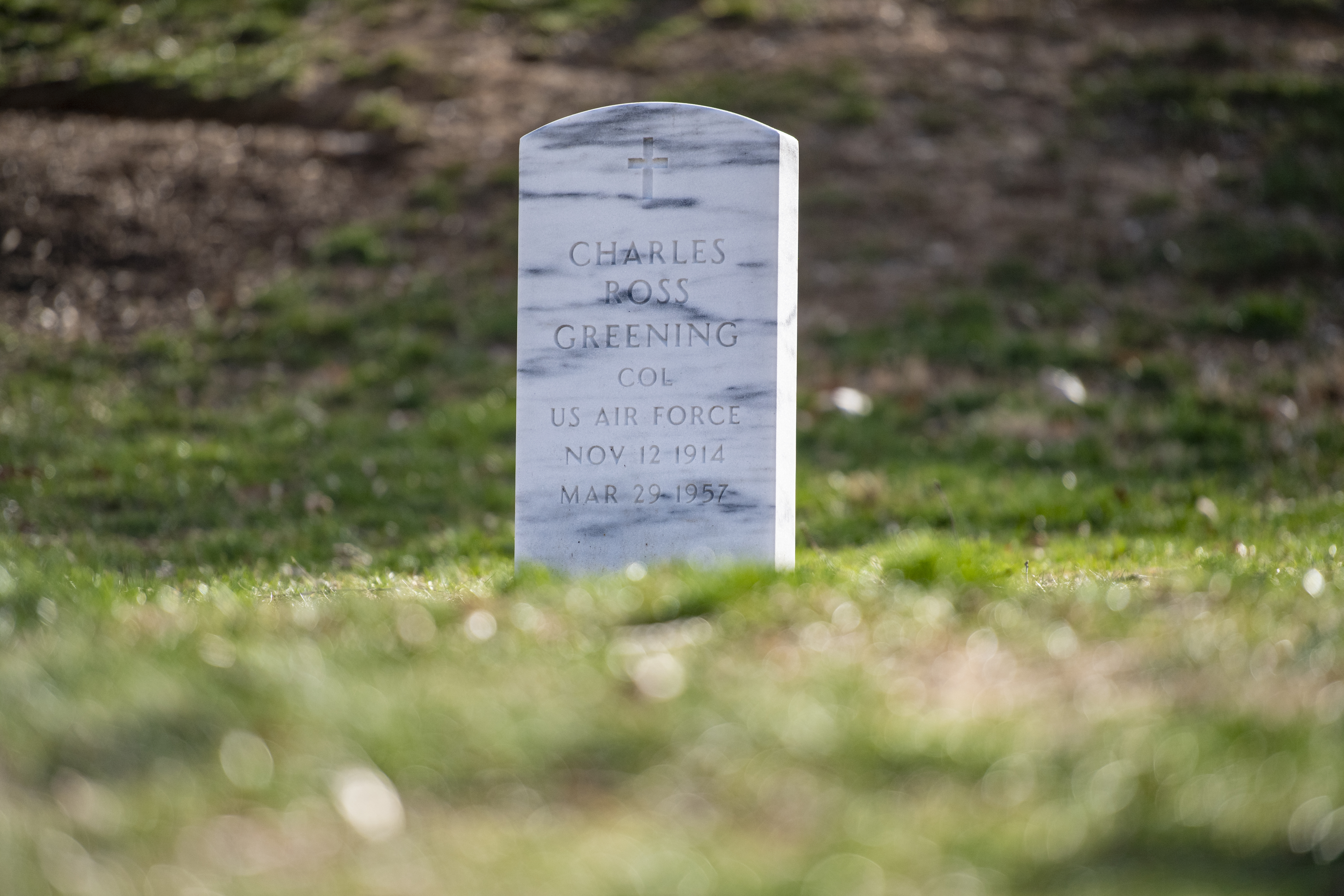
Grave at Arlington National Cemetery

Charles Ross Greening was born on November 12, 1914, in Carroll, Iowa, to Charles W and Olive Jewell (née Ross) Greening. He took his first plane ride in June 1921. After his father's bank failed, the family moved to Tacoma, Washington, in 1925.

Greening received a bachelor's degree from Washington State College of Fine Arts in 1936, minoring in physical education and military science, and serving as the ROTC commandant. He entered the military on June 23, 1936, at Fort Lewis, Washington.

On 9 June 1937, Greening graduated from the Air Corps Flying School at Randolph Field. He was then assigned to the 20th Pursuit Group at Barksdale Field, flying Curtiss P-6 Hawks and Boeing P-26 Peashooters.

Shortly after arriving at his first duty station, Greening took leave to marry his college sweetheart, Dorothy "Dot" Watson (1912–2003). They were married on 11 November 1937. They had two children together, both boys, Allen and Chuck.

In 1938, he was assigned to Hamilton Army Airfield and the 7th Bombardment Group. Then in 1940, Greening volunteered to open McChord Field, where he flew the Douglas B-23 Dragon, and then the B-25 in the 17th Bombardment Group. Then in 1941, his unit was assigned to Pendleton Field, where they patrolled the Oregon Coast for Japanese submarines after the start of WWII. They then transferred back to McChord, and then onwards to Columbia, South Carolina, where Greening volunteered to help with the B-25 armament for Doolittle's upcoming secret and hazardous mission. Greening joined the Doolittle group at Eglin Field. Greening eventually took over the role of pilot for plane #40-2249, with Kenneth Reddy as co-pilot, Frank Kappeler as navigator, Melvin Gardner as engineer-gunner, and William Birch as bombardier-gunner.

== World War II ==
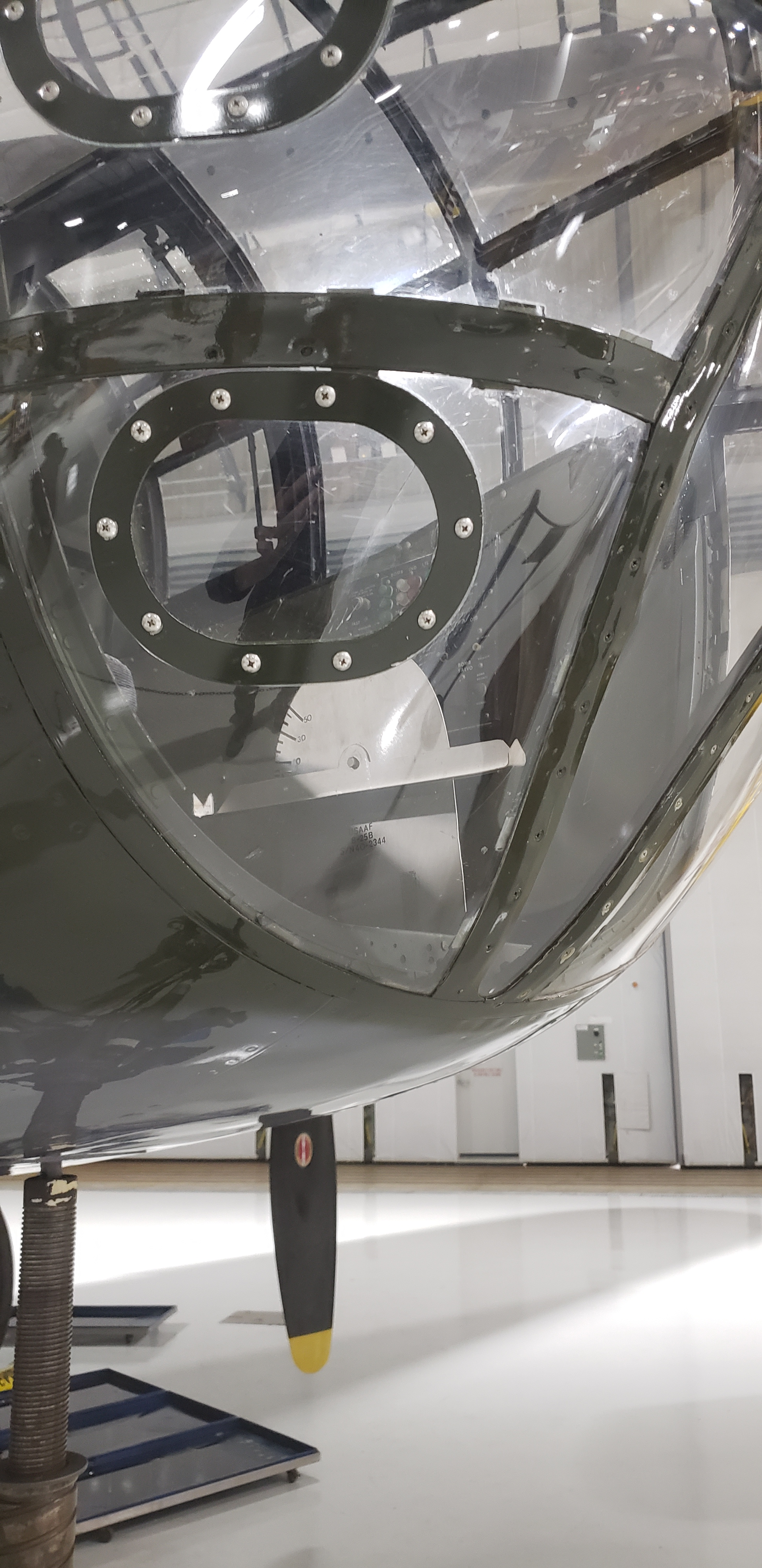
B-25 "Mark Twain" bombsight, designed by Greening for the Doolittle Raid

The Norden bombsight was ineffective for the low-level bombing planned for the Doolittle raid. Instead, Greening designed a "Mark Twain" bombsight out of Duralumin, in reference to the lead line used by Mississippi River paddle wheelers. It consisted of a quadrangle measuring 7 inches (18 cm) by 7 inches (18 cm), inscribed with a 90° arc in 10° increments, and placed horizontally on the Norden mount. When the quadrangle was turned left or right, a handle deflected the Pilot direction indicator, indicating the prescribed heading for the pilot. A vertical piece, measuring 5.25 inches (13.3 cm) by 7.25 inches (18.4 cm), set the dropping angle, based on bomb size, altitude, wind conditions, and ground speed. The vertical piece had a sighting bar with a "V" notch at the rear, which was to be aligned with a point at the front, just as in a rifle sight. The bombardier aimed the bombsight in the direction of the target, raising the tail as he got closer, until he reached the dropping angle, when he would release the bombs. On 18 April 1942, then Captain Greening, piloting the Hari Kari-er, a B-25B Mitchell medium bomber equipped with the "Mark Twain" bombsight he designed, launched from the United States Navy's aircraft carrier USS Hornet (CV-8), in the Doolittle Raid of Japan. He led a flight of three aircraft aiming to bomb oil refineries, docks, warehouses and industrial areas of Yokohama. However, due to faulty compass alignment, most of the planes arrived over Japan about 60 miles (97 km) north of their intention. As a consequence, Greening ended up bombing a Sakura refinery east of Tokyo. Gardner was able to shoot down two of four Japanese fighters that attacked them, while Greening attacked several patrol boats in Tokyo harbor. After reaching China in the area northeast of Quzhou, they were running out of fuel, and were forced to bail out, abandoning their aircraft. The crews eventually reunited on the ground, and with Chinese assistance, finally made it to Chongqing on 29 April. There, all of the raiders were awarded the Distinguished Flying Cross by General and Colonel John Magruder and Clayton Lawrence Bissell, and personally thanked by Chiang Kai-shek and his wife, Madame Chiang Kai-shek. On 4 May, the raiders made it to Dinjon, India.

After he returned to the United States in June, Greening trained in the Martin B-26 Marauder, made Group Commander within the 17th Bombardment Group, and promoted to Lt. Col. He was assigned to Telergma in North Africa, and flew 27 missions before being shot down over Naples on July 17, 1943, and taken prisoner. After taking a direct hit to his right engine, Greening ordered his crew to bail out. On the descent, Greening suffered a bullet wound near his knee, a dislocated hip, and two sprained ankles, besides barely missing landing in the crater of Mount Vesuvius. While a captive of the Italians, Greening drew his captor's portraits, both to occupy his time, and to get better food and treatment for himself and his men. Greening ended up in the Chieti POW camp. After Italy capitulated on 8 September 1943, German troops took over the camp on 23 September, and plans were made to move the POWs to Germany. Greening escaped from the prisoner transport train on 3 October 1943, during an air raid on Bolzano.

He evaded capture until 23 March 1944. Up to that time he received assistance from compassionate Italians in the area of Verona and Cividale. For a time, he shared a mountain cave with two New Zealander escapees, Bob Smith and Jack Lang, receiving food assistance from the villagers of Valle, Reant, Masarolis and Pedrosa.

On 18 April 1944, Greening arrived at Stalag Luft I POW camp, where he stayed for the duration of the war. Making productive use of his time once again, Greening turned to art. He organized classes, taught 75 students the basic principles of drawing and painting, drew portraits, sketched combat scenes as described by his fellow prisoners, put on a "Display of the Week" in the mess hall, and organized the "Kriegie Kraft Karnival" on 21–23 July 1944 with art work and models on display from all over the camp. After the war, Brown & Bigelow printed Not as Briefed, which contained 75 of Greening's paintings, with J.M. Coppinger's introduction and captions.

After the German surrender, and the Russian occupation of the area, the POWs were flown out by B-17s and C-46s, with Greening flying out on 14 May 1945. Greening was able to transport 56 crates of arts and handicrafts made by the POWs. Some of this collection was used by Greening to prepare a POW Exposition, which included a reproduction of the camp's 16-man room, solitary confinement cell, and escape attempts. The exposition opened on 1 October 1945 in the Rockefeller Center Museum of Science and Industry. The exposition appeared in several US cities before concluding in Washington, D.C., that September.

== Post-war ==
Greening served as the Chief of the Army Air Forces Prisoner of War Exposition from June 1945 to September 1946, followed by service as Director of the Syndicate Division and then Chief of the Seminar Division with the Air Tactical School at Tyndall Air Force Base, Florida, from December 1946 to August 1948.

He then attended Armed Forces Staff College from August 1948 to January 1949, and then served as an RB-17 Flying Fortress and RB-29 Superfortress pilot and as Director of Operations and Training for the 91st Strategic Reconnaissance Wing at McGuire Air Force Base, New Jersey, from January to June 1949. He next served as Commander of the 91st Strategic Reconnaissance Group at McGuire AFB from June to August 1949, followed by U.S. Air Force Special Staff School at Craig Air Force Base, Alabama, from September to October 1949.

After serving in numerous positions at the Headquarters U.S. Air Force in the Pentagon from November 1949 to August 1953, Greening attended Air War College at Maxwell Air Force Base, Alabama, from August 1953 to August 1954, and then attended the Attaché Course with the Strategic Intelligence School in Washington, D.C., from August to November 1954. Greening served as Air Attaché to Australia and New Zealand from January 1955 until he was forced to return to the United States due to an illness in June 1956.

He remained in a patient status at Walter Reed Army Hospital in Washington, D.C. Greening died of an infection on March 29, 1957, at the Bethesda Naval Hospital, Bethesda, Maryland, while on active duty.

== Awards and decorations ==
His decorations include:

USAF Command pilot badge
Silver Star
Distinguished Flying Cross
Purple Heart
Air Medal with four bronze oak leaf clusters
Prisoner of War Medal
American Defense Service Medal
American Campaign Medal with bronze campaign star
Asiatic-Pacific Campaign Medal with two bronze campaign stars
European-African-Middle Eastern Campaign Medal with four bronze campaign stars
World War II Victory Medal
National Defense Service Medal
Air Force Longevity Service Award with four bronze oak leaf clusters
Order of Yung Hui, 5th Class (Republic of China)
War Memorial Medal (Republic of China)

=== Silver Star citation ===
Citation:

For gallantry in action. On 28 January 1943, Lieutenant Colonel (then Major) Greening led the group without fighter escort. On an attack against the harbor and quays at Sfax, Tunisia. The bombers were attacked by five (5) FW 190's which made persistent attacks and succeeded in severely damaging the tail assembly of Lieutenant Colonel Greening's plane. Only by his outstanding display of courage and coolness in close aerial combat and through consummate skill and fearlessness in the maneuvering of his badly damaged airplane was he able to keep his formation intact and thus successfully complete the mission. By his display of gallantry, Lieutenant Colonel Greening has demonstrated exceptional qualities of leadership and courage and has upheld the highest traditions of the Army Air Forces.

== Legacy ==
Greening wrote and painted pictures from his life and experience during the war. After he died in 1957, his wife Dorothy gathered his notes and pictures and, with the help of his sister, Shirley Greening Morgan, and her daughter (his niece), Karen Morgan Driscoll, published his memoir, Not as Briefed: From the Doolittle Raid to a German Stalag.
