= Doolittle Raid =

American bombing of Japan on April 18, 1942

- Part of air raids on Japan during the Pacific War of World War II
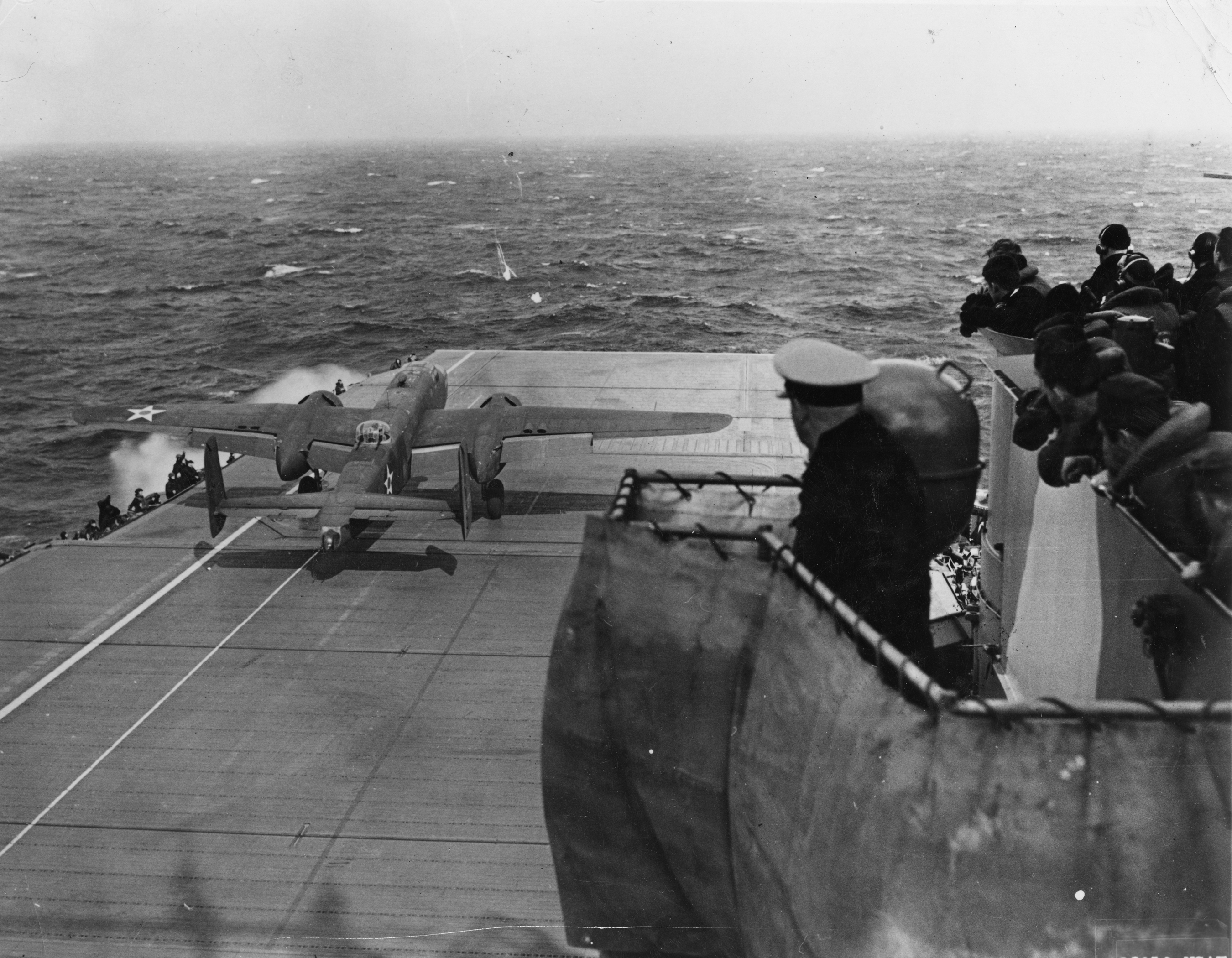
- Jimmy Doolittle and his B-25 Mitchell taking off from USS Hornet for the raid
Date	18 April 1942; 84 years ago
Location	Greater Tokyo Area and other Japanese cities
Result	Minimal damage to Japanese targets; Major propaganda and psychological boost to Allies; Japanese retaliatory attacks in China

Belligerents
United States; China	Japan

Commanders and leaders
Jimmy Doolittle	Prince Naruhiko Higashikuni

Strength
16 B-25 Mitchell medium bombers; 80 airmen (52 officers, 28 enlisted); 2 aircraft carriers; 4 cruisers; 8 destroyers	Unknown number of Kawasaki Ki-61 Hien fighters and anti-aircraft artillery

Casualties and losses
16 B-25s lost (15 destroyed, 1 interned in the Soviet Union); 3 killed; 8 captured (4 lived to be rescued and 4 died in captivity: 3 executed, 1 by disease)	50 killed; 400 injured (including civilians); 5 sailors captured; 5 patrol boats sunk; One nearly converted aircraft carrier damaged

The Doolittle Raid (also known as Doolittle's Raid or the Tokyo Raid) was an air raid by the United States Army Air Forces on the Japanese capital of Tokyo and other places in Honshu during World War II. Launched on April 18, 1942, it was the first American air operation to strike the Japanese archipelago. Although the raid caused comparatively minor damage, it demonstrated that the Japanese mainland was vulnerable to American air attacks. It served as an initial retaliation for the attack on Pearl Harbor on December 7, 1941, and provided an important boost to American morale. The raid was named for Lieutenant Colonel James Doolittle, who planned and led the attack. It was one of six American carrier raids against Japan and Japanese-held territories conducted in the first half of 1942.

Under the final plan, 16 B-25B Mitchell medium bombers, each with a crew of five, were launched from the US Navy aircraft carrier USS Hornet, in the Pacific Ocean. There were no fighter escorts. After bombing military and industrial targets, the crews were to continue westward to land in China.

On the ground, the raid killed around 50 people and injured 400. The physical damage was minimal, but the raid had major psychological effects. In the United States, it raised morale. In Japan, it raised fear and doubt about the ability of military leaders to defend the home islands, but the bombing and strafing of civilians created a desire for retribution—this was exploited for propaganda purposes. The raid also pushed forward Admiral Isoroku Yamamoto's plans to attack Midway Island in the Central Pacific—an attack that turned into a decisive defeat of the Imperial Japanese Navy (IJN) by the US Navy in the Battle of Midway in June 1942. The consequences of the Doolittle Raid were most severely felt in China: in reprisal for the raid, the Japanese launched the Zhejiang-Jiangxi campaign.

Of the 16 crews involved, 14 returned to the United States or reached the safety of American forces, though one man was killed while bailing out. Eight men were captured by Japanese forces in eastern China (the other two crew members having drowned in the sea), and three of them were later executed. All but one of the 16 B-25s were destroyed in crashes, while one of the planes landed at Vladivostok in the Soviet Union.

Because the Soviet Union was not officially at war with Japan, it was required, under international law, to intern the crew for the duration of the war. The crew's B-25 was also confiscated. However, within a year, the crew was secretly allowed to leave the Soviet Union, under the guise of an escape—they returned to the United States or to American units elsewhere by way of Allied-occupied Iran and North Africa.

Doolittle initially believed that he would be court-martialed for missing his primary targets. Instead, he received the Medal of Honor and was promoted two ranks to brigadier general.

== Background ==
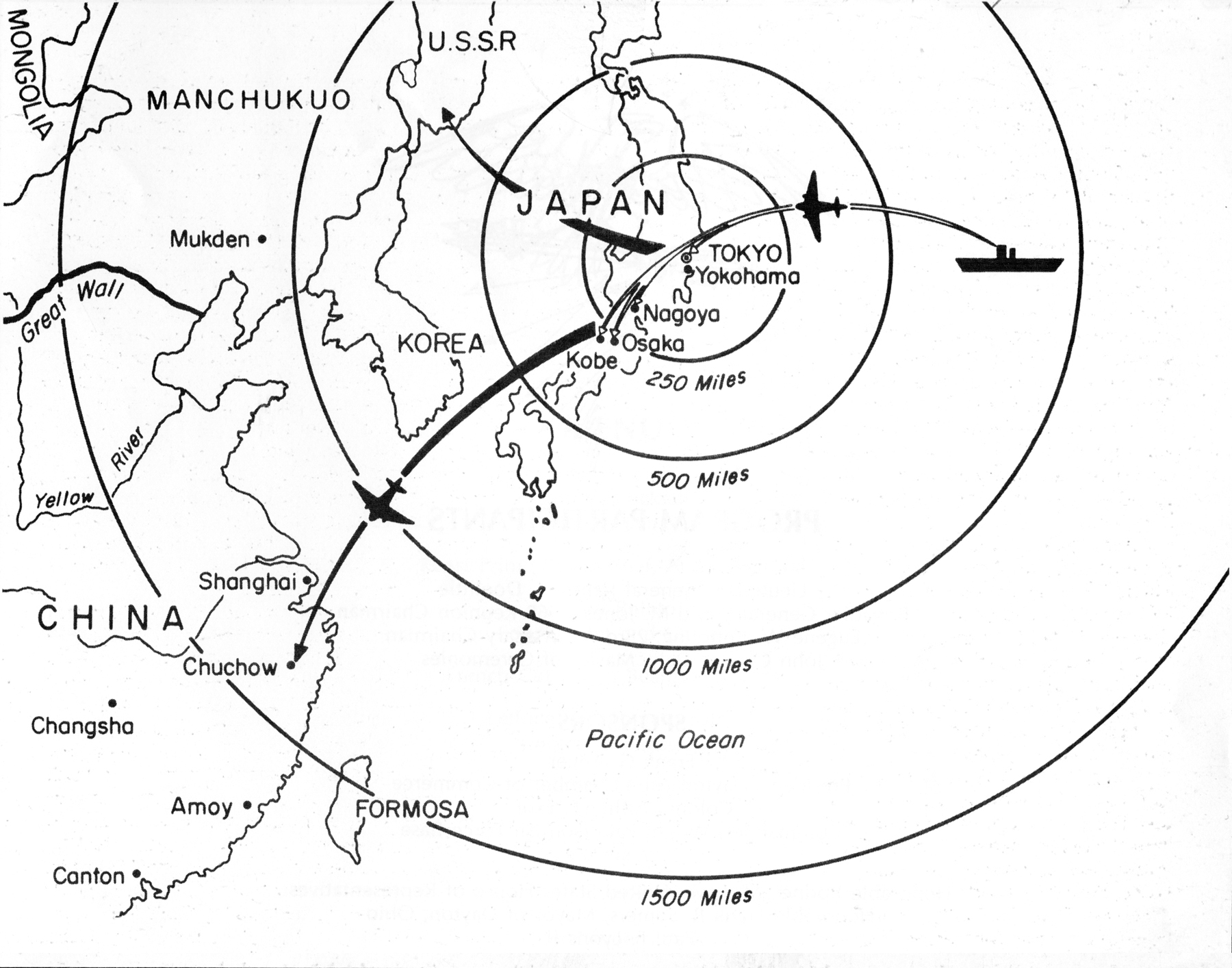
Doolittle Raid targets and landing fields

President Franklin D. Roosevelt spoke to the Joint Chiefs of Staff in a meeting at the White House on December 21, 1941 and said that Japan should be bombed as soon as possible to boost public morale after Pearl Harbor. Doolittle recounted in his autobiography that the raid was intended to bolster American morale and to cause the Japanese to begin doubting their leadership: "An attack on the Japanese homeland would cause confusion in the minds of the Japanese people and sow doubt about the reliability of their leaders. ... Americans badly needed a morale boost."

The concept for the attack came from Navy Captain Francis S. Low, Assistant Chief of Staff for antisubmarine warfare. He reported to Admiral Ernest J. King on January 10, 1942 that he thought that twin-engined Army bombers could be launched from an aircraft carrier, after observing several at Naval Station Norfolk Chambers Field in Norfolk, where the runway was painted with the outline of a carrier deck for landing practice. Doolittle, a famous military test pilot, civilian aviator, and aeronautical engineer before the war, was assigned to Army Air Forces Headquarters to plan the raid. The aircraft to be used would need a cruising range of 2,400 nautical miles (4,400 km) with a 2,000-pound (910 kg) bomb load. Doolittle considered the B-25B Mitchell, Martin B-26 Marauder, Douglas B-18 Bolo, and Douglas B-23 Dragon. The B-26 had questionable takeoff characteristics from a carrier deck. The wingspans of the B-18 and B-23 were larger than that of the B-25, reducing the number that could be taken aboard a carrier and posing risks to the ship's superstructure. The B-25 had yet to see combat and had a range of about 1,300 miles, but tests indicated that it could fulfill the mission's requirements if it were modified to hold nearly twice as much fuel. (Note: The first bombing mission by B-25s preceded the Doolittle Raid by only 12 days. On April 6, 1942, six Mitchells bombed Gasmata, New Britain. This was followed on April 12th and 13th by two days of attacks against Cebu City and Davao in the Philippines. All of these were conducted by the 3rd Bomb Group, which staged 10 Mitchells through Darwin, Australia to Mindanao.)

Doolittle's first report on the plan suggested that the bombers fly to Vladivostok after their attack, where they could be handed to the Soviet Union under the Lend-Lease program. This stratagem was intended to circumvent Moscow's April 1941 neutrality pact with Japan, but Soviet officials refused. Instead, planners looked to China, adding some 600 nautical miles (1,100 km) to the flight. Despite concerns about Japanese reprisals, Chiang Kai-shek agreed to provide five refueling sites and a final destination: Chongqing.

No fighter escort was possible, for no fighter aircraft with the required range were available.

== Preparation ==
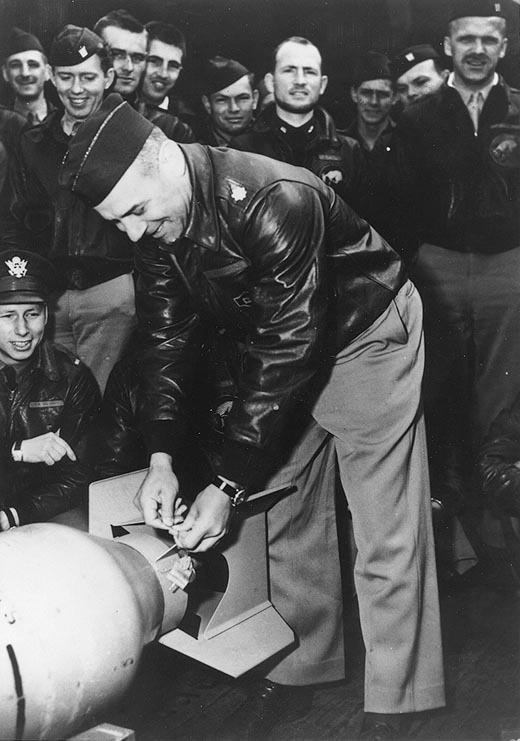
Lieutenant Colonel Doolittle wires a Japanese friendship medal to a bomb, for "return" to its originators.

After planning indicated that the B-25 best met the mission's requirements, two were loaded aboard the aircraft carrier USS Hornet at Norfolk and were flown off the deck without difficulty on February 3, 1942. The raid was immediately approved. The crews would be drawn from the 17th Bombardment Group (Medium), which had been the first group to receive B-25s and had become the most experienced B-25 unit in the service; all four of its squadrons flew the bomber by September 1941. Its first assignment after the United States entered the war was to the U.S. Eighth Air Force.

The 17th BG, then flying antisubmarine patrols from Pendleton, Oregon, was immediately moved cross-country to Columbia Army Air Base at West Columbia, South Carolina, ostensibly to fly similar patrols off the East Coast of the United States, but in actuality to prepare for the mission against Japan. The group officially transferred on February 9, 1942, to Columbia, where its combat crews were offered the opportunity to volunteer for an "extremely hazardous", but unspecified mission. On February 19, the group was detached from the Eighth Air Force and assigned to III Bomber Command.

Initial planning called for 20 aircraft to fly the mission, and 24 of the group's B-25B Mitchell bombers were sent to Mid-Continent Airlines' modification center in Minneapolis, Minnesota. With support from two senior airline managers, Wold-Chamberlain Field's maintenance hangar was the first modification center to become operational. The 710th Military Police Battalion from nearby Fort Snelling provided tight security around this hangar. B-25B aircraft modifications included:

- Remove the lower gun turret.
- Install de-icers and anti-icers.
- Mount steel blast plates on the fuselage around the upper turret.
- Remove the liaison radio set to save weight.
- Install a 160-US-gallon (610 L; 130 imp gal) collapsible neoprene auxiliary fuel tank, fixed to the top of the bomb bay.
- Install mounts for more fuel cells in the bomb bay, crawlway, and lower turret area, to increase fuel capacity from 646 to 1,141 U.S. gallons (538 to 950 imperial gallons, or 2,445 to 4,319 L).
- Install broomsticks as mock gun barrels in the tail cone.
- Replace the Norden bombsight with a makeshift aiming sight devised by pilot Capt. C. Ross Greening. Dubbed the "Mark Twain", its materials cost just 20 cents.

Cameras were installed in two bombers to record the results of the bombing.

The 24 crews were selected and picked up the modified bombers in Minneapolis and flew them to Eglin Field, Florida, beginning March 1, 1942. There, the crews received concentrated training for three weeks in simulated carrier deck takeoffs, low-level and night flying, low-altitude bombing, and over-water navigation, operating primarily out of Eglin Auxiliary Field #1, a more secluded site. Lieutenant Henry L. Miller, a U.S. Navy flight instructor from nearby Naval Air Station Pensacola, supervised their takeoff training and accompanied the crews to the launch. For his efforts, Miller is considered an honorary member of the Raider group.

Doolittle stated in his after-action report that the crews reached a "safely operational" level of training, despite several days when flying was not possible because of rain and fog. One aircraft was written off in a landing accident on March 10th and another was heavily damaged in a takeoff accident on 23 March, while a third was removed from the mission because of a nose wheel shimmy that could not be repaired in time.

On March 25, 1942, the remaining 22 B-25s took off from Eglin for McClellan Field, California. They arrived two days later at the Sacramento Air Depot for inspection and final modifications. Five crews did extra training on March 30 and 31 at the Willows-Glenn County Airport. A total of 16 B-25s were flown to Naval Air Station Alameda on 31 March. Fifteen made up the mission force and the 16th, by last-minute agreement with the Navy, was loaded so that it could be launched shortly after departure from San Francisco to demonstrate to the Army pilots that there was sufficient deck space for a safe takeoff. Instead, that bomber was made part of the mission force. (Note: 1st Lt. Richard Joyce was to have flown this aircraft back to the mainland with Navy Lieut. Miller as his copilot. Instead, he flew the tenth bomber off Hornet and Miller remained aboard until the task force returned to port when Doolittle decided to increase the attacking force to all 16 aircraft.)

== Participating aircraft ==
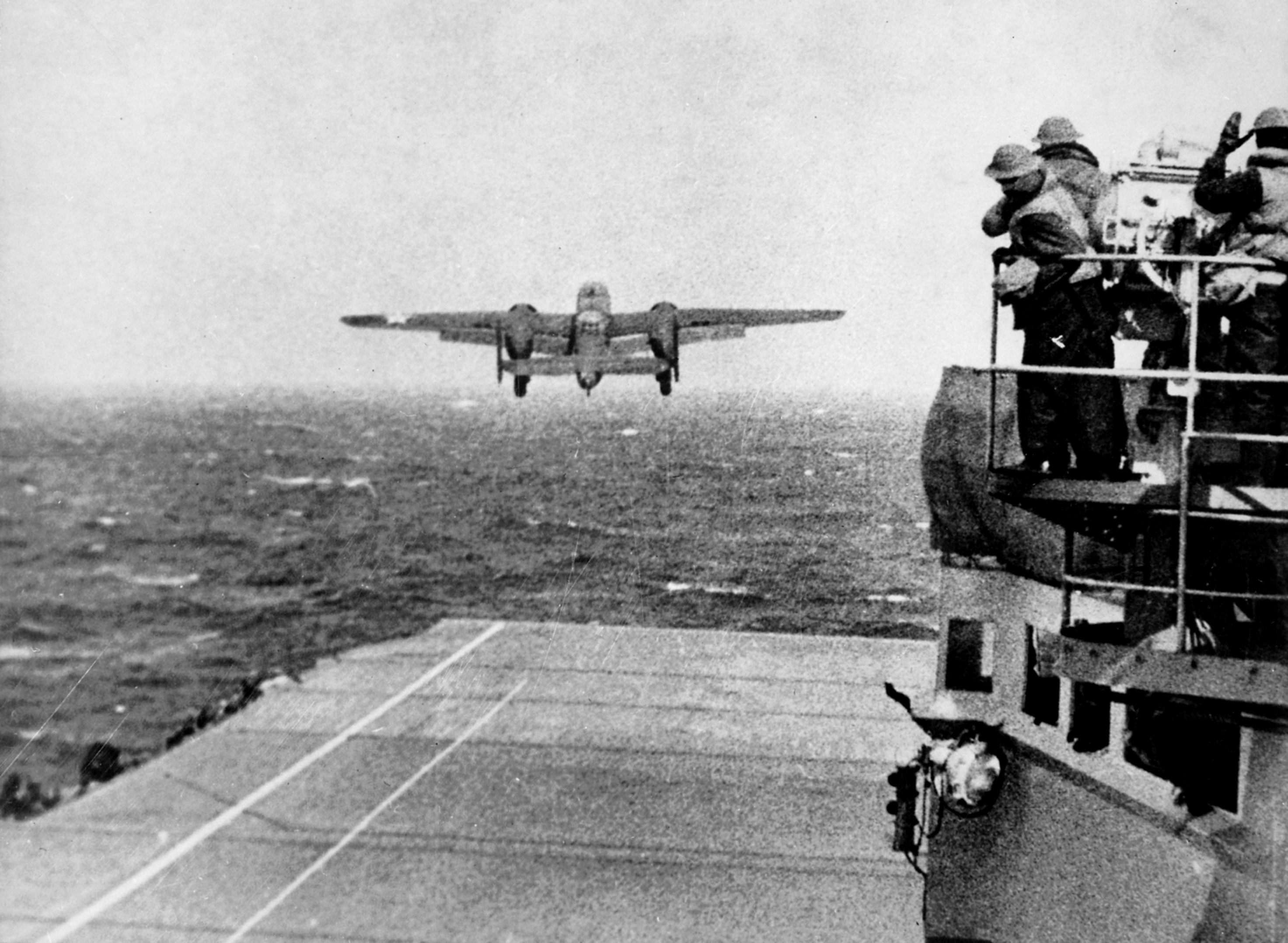
A B-25 Mitchell taking off from USS Hornet for the raid

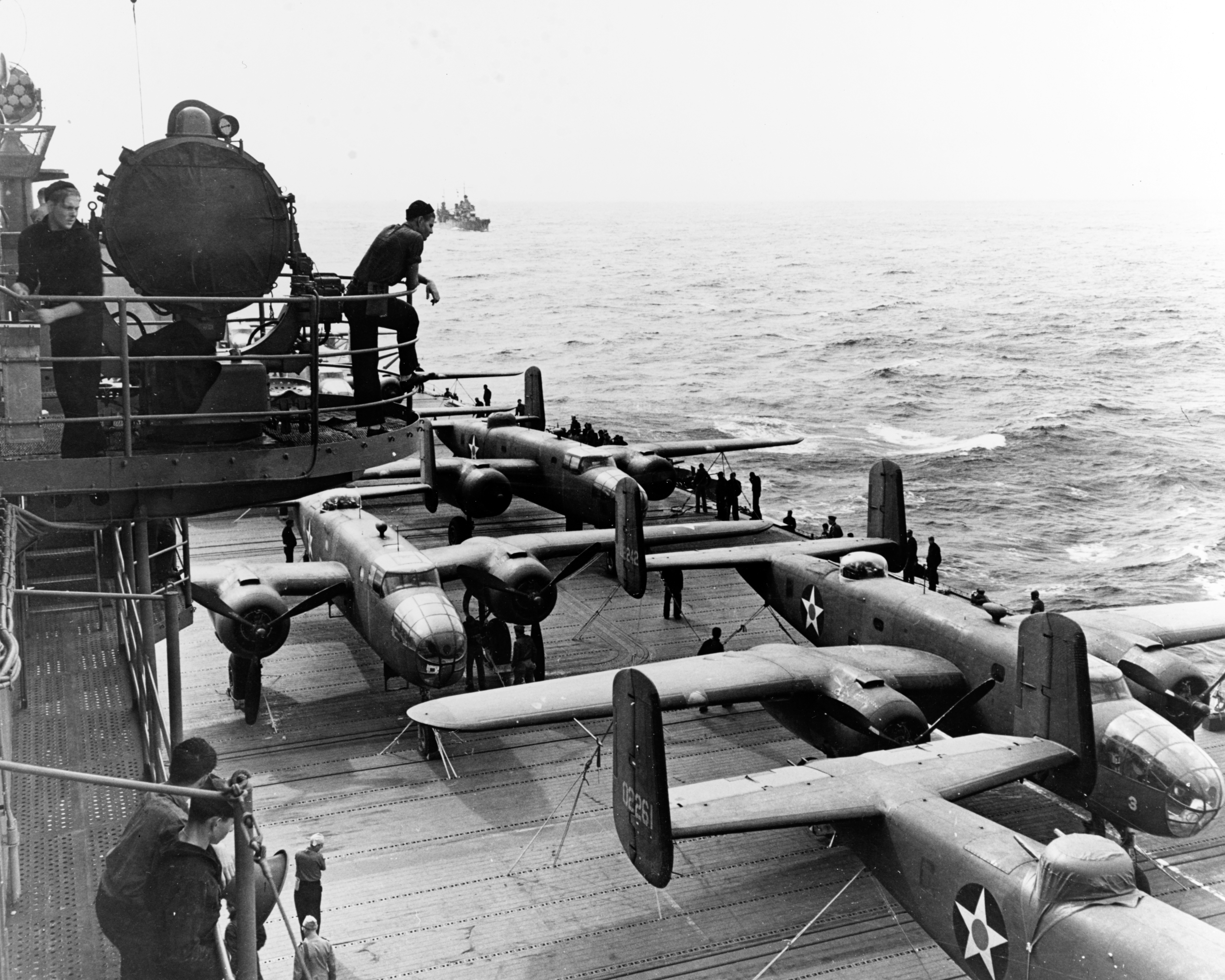
B-25 Mitchells aboard USS Hornet

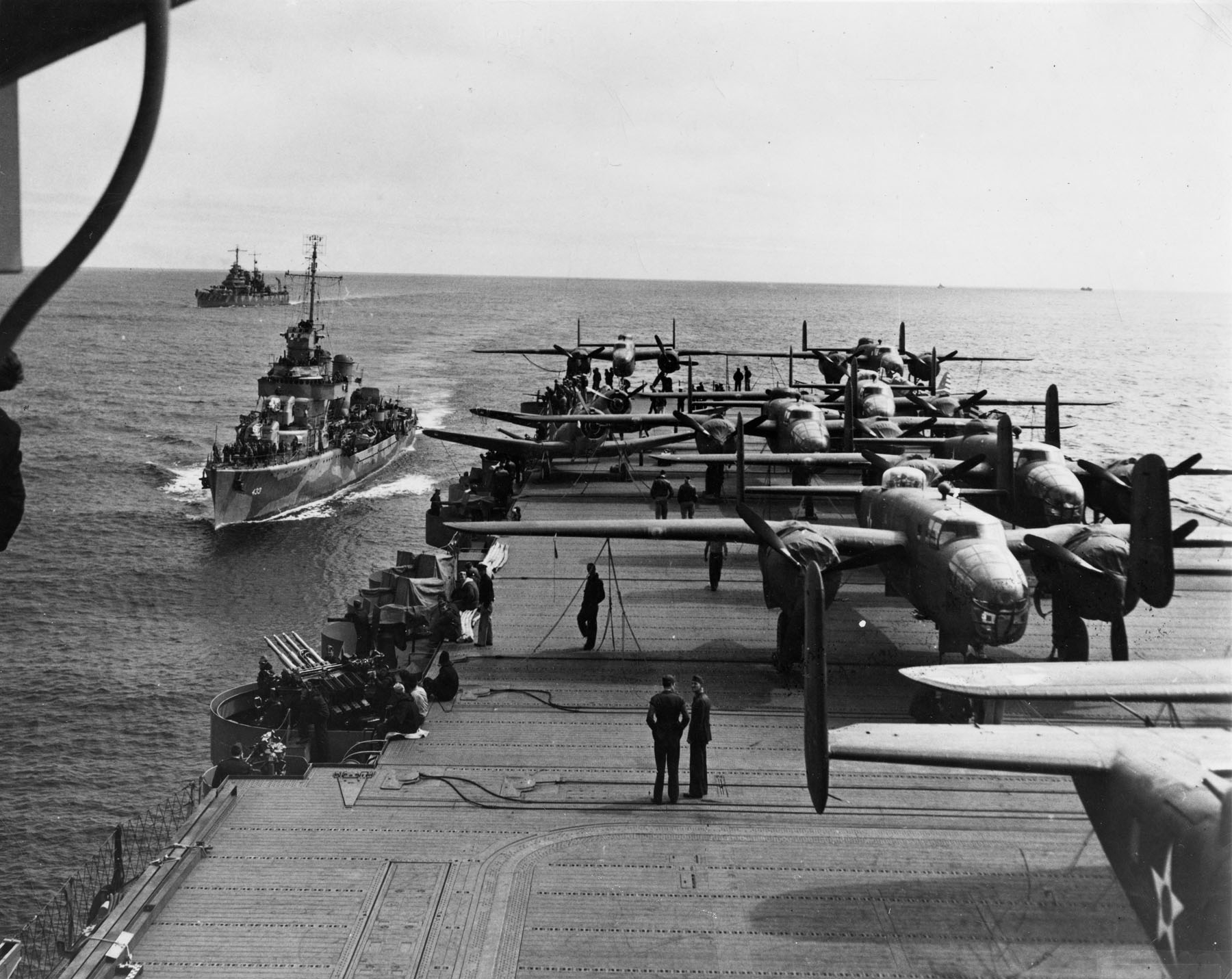
Aft flight deck of USS Hornet

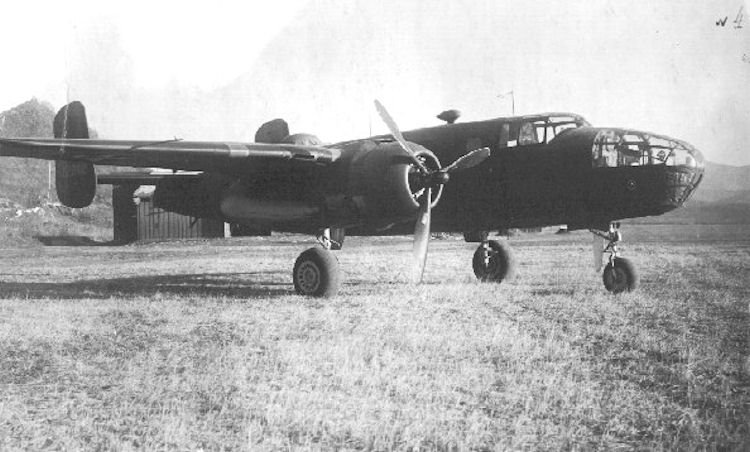
B-25 piloted by Capt. York after emergency landing in the Soviet Union

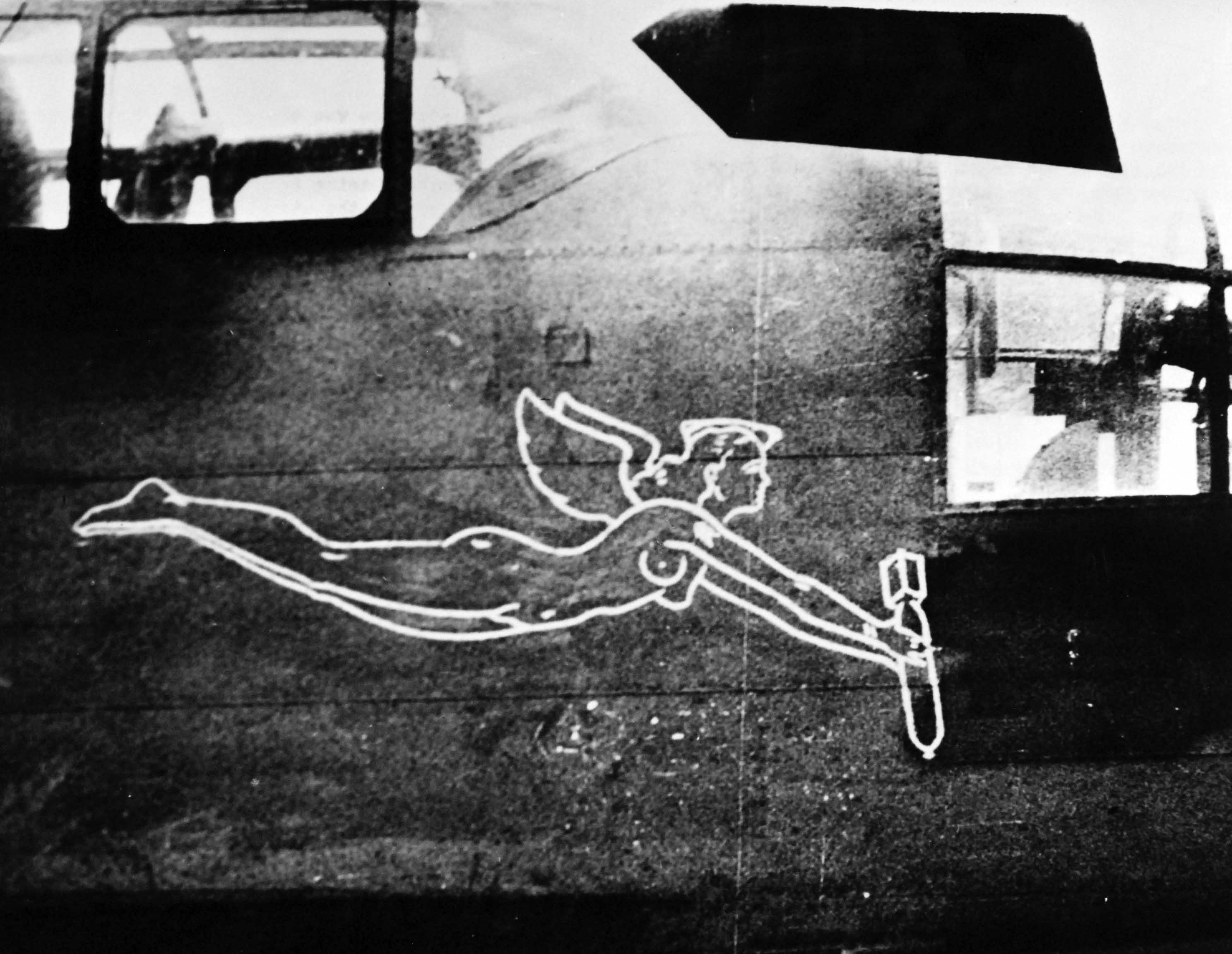
Nose art of Hari Kari-er

In order of launching, the 16 aircraft were:

AAF serial number	Nickname	Sqdn	Bomber crew image	Target	Pilot	Co-Pilot	Navigator	Bombardier	Flight Surgeon	Engineer Gunner	Disposition
40-2344				Tokyo	Lt. Col. James H. Doolittle	2d Lt. Richard E. Cole	2d Lt. Henry A. Potter	SSgt. Fred A. Braemer	None	SSgt Paul J. Leonard	crashed N Quzhou, China
40-2292		37th BS		Tokyo	1st Lt. Travis Hoover	2d Lt. William N. Fitzhugh	2d Lt. Carl R. Wildner	2d Lt. Richard E. Miller	None	SSgt. Douglas V. Radney	crashed Ningbo, China
40-2270	Whiskey Pete	95th BS		Tokyo	1st Lt. Robert M. Gray	2d Lt. Jacob E. Manch	2d Lt. Charles J. Ozuk	Sgt. Aden E. Jones	None	Cpl Leland D. Faktor	crashed SE Quzhou, China
40-2282		95th BS		Tokyo	1st Lt. Everett W. Holstrom	2d Lt. Lucian N. Youngblood	2d Lt. Harry C. McCool	Sgt Robert J. Stephens	None	Cpl Bert M. Jordan	crashed SE Shangrao, China
40-2283		95th BS		Tokyo	Capt. David M. Jones	2d Lt. Rodney R. Wilder	2d Lt. Eugene F. McGurl	2d Lt. Denver V. Truelove	None	Sgt. Joseph W. Manske	crashed SW Quzhou, China
40-2298	The Green Hornet	95th BS		Tokyo	1st Lt. Dean E. Hallmark	2d Lt. Robert J. Meder	2d Lt. Chase J. Nielsen	Sgt. William J. Dieter	None	Cpl Donald E. Fitzmaurice	ditched at sea Wenzhou, China
40-2261	The Ruptured Duck	95th BS		Tokyo	1st Lt. Ted W. Lawson	2d Lt. Dean Davenport	2d Lt. Charles L. McClure	2d Lt. Robert S. Clever	None	Sgt. David J. Thatcher	ditched at sea Changshu, China
40-2242		95th BS		Tokyo	Capt. Edward J. York (Note: York was born Edward Joseph Cichowski and was known as "Ski". He legally changed his name to York in early 1942 before the raid.)	2d Lt. Robert G. Emmens	2d Lt. Nolan A. Herndon	SSgt. Theodore H. Laban	None	Sgt. David W. Pohl	interned Primorsky Krai, USSR
40-2303	Whirling Dervish	34th BS		Tokyo	1st Lt. Harold F. Watson	2d Lt. James M. Parker Jr.	2d Lt. Thomas C. Griffin	Sgt. Wayne M. Bissell	None	Tsgt. Eldred V. Scott	crashed S Nanchang, China
40-2250		89th RS		Tokyo	1st Lt. Richard O. Joyce	2d Lt. J. Royden Stork	2d Lt. Horace E. Crouch	Sgt. George E. Larkin Jr.	None	SSgt. Edwin W. Horton Jr.	crashed NE Quzhou, China
40-2249	Hari Kari-er	89th RS		Yokohama	Capt. C. Ross Greening	2d Lt. Kenneth E. Reddy	2d Lt. Frank A. Kappeler	SSgt. William L. Birch	None	Sgt. Melvin J. Gardner	crashed NE Quzhou, China
40-2278	Fickle Finger of Fate	37th BS		Yokohama	1st Lt. William M. Bower	2d Lt. Thadd H. Blanton	2d Lt. William R. Pound Jr.	TSgt. Waldo J. Bither	None	SSgt. Omer A. Duquette	crashed NE Quzhou, China
40-2247	The Avenger	37th BS		Yokosuka	1st Lt. Edgar E. McElroy	2d Lt. Richard A. Knobloch	2d Lt. Clayton J. Campbell	Sgt. Robert C. Bourgeois	None	Sgt. Adam Ray Williams	crashed N Nanchang, China
40-2297		89th RS		Nagoya	Maj. John A. Hilger	2d Lt. Jack A. Sims	2d Lt. James H. Macia Jr.	SSgt. Edwin V. Bain	None	SSgt. Jacob Eirman	crashed SE Shangrao, China
40-2267	TNT	89th RS		Kobe	1st Lt. Donald G. Smith	2d Lt. Griffith P. Williams	2d Lt. Howard A. Sessler	2d Lt. Howard A. Sessler	2d Lt. Thomas R. White M.D.	Sgt. Edward J. Saylor	ditched at sea Changshu, China
40-2268	Bat Out of Hell	34th BS		Nagoya	1st Lt. William G. Farrow	2d Lt. Robert L. Hite	2d Lt. George Barr	Cpl. Jacob D. DeShazer	None	Sgt. Harold A. Spatz	crashed S Ningbo, China

== Mission ==
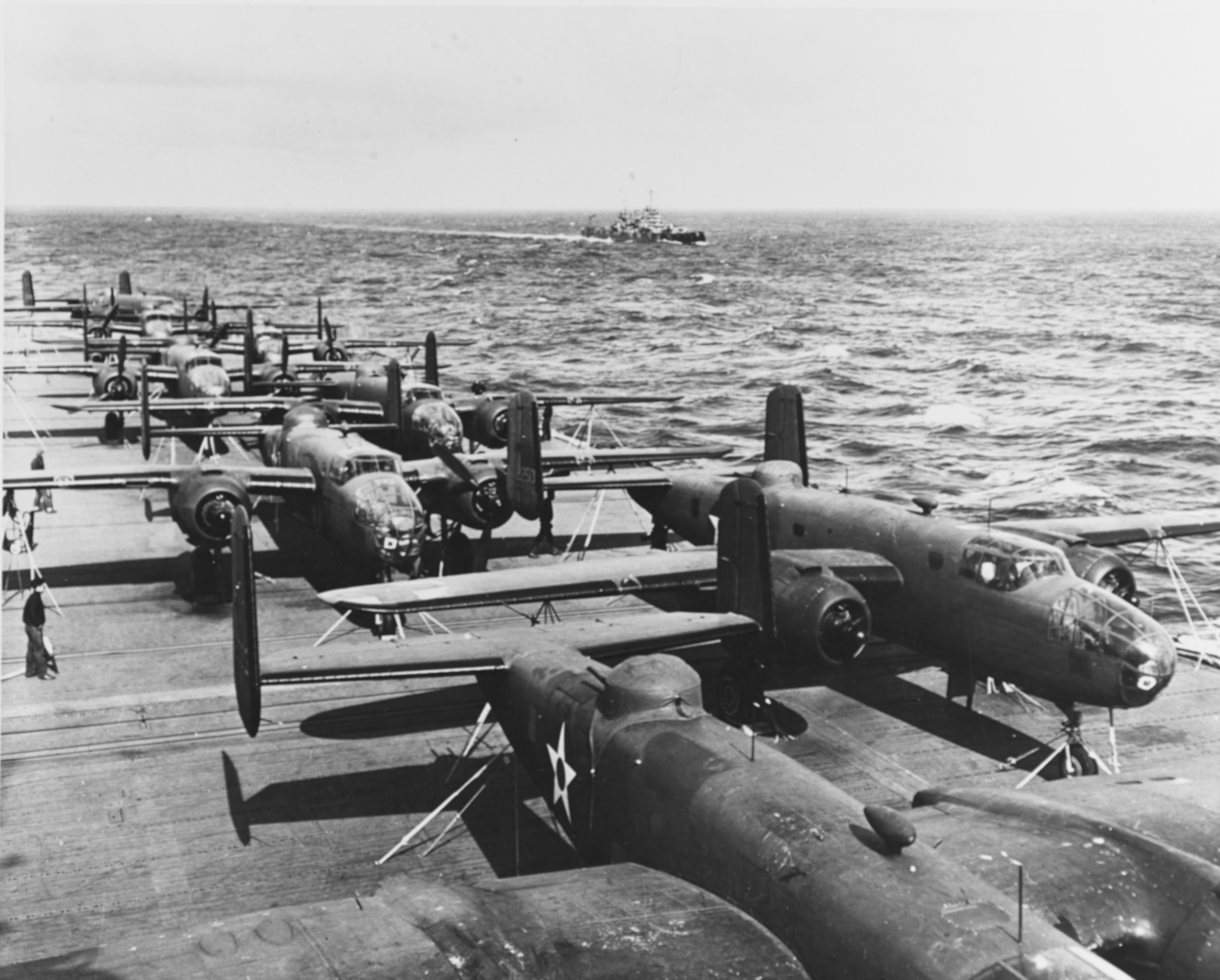
B-25Bs on USS Hornet en route to Japan

On April 1, 1942, the 16 modified bombers, their five-man crews, and Army maintenance personnel, totaling 71 officers and 130 enlisted men, (Note: Doolittle took along all 22 flight crews, both to provide spare flight personnel and as an additional security measure. Lawson wrote that the copilot of one crew (Farrow's) was replaced on 17 April, the day before the mission, by one of the spare pilots.) were loaded onto Hornet at Naval Air Station Alameda in California. Each aircraft carried four specially constructed 500-pound (230 kg) bombs. Three of these were high-explosive munitions and one was a bundle of incendiaries. The incendiaries were long tubes, wrapped together to be carried in the bomb bay, but designed to separate and scatter over a wide area after release. Five bombs had Japanese "friendship" medals wired to them—medals awarded by the Japanese government to U.S. servicemen before the war.

The bombers' armament was reduced to increase range by decreasing weight. Each bomber launched with two .50-caliber (12.7 mm) machine guns in an upper turret and a .30-caliber (7.62 mm) machine gun in the nose. The aircraft were clustered closely and tied down on Hornet's flight deck in the order of launch.

Hornet and Task Force 18 got underway from San Francisco Bay at 08:48 on April 2nd, with the 16 bombers in clear view. At noon the next day, parts to complete modifications that had not been finished at McClellan were lowered to the forward deck of Hornet by Navy blimp L-8. A few days later, the carrier met with Vice Admiral William Halsey Jr.'s Task Force 16: the carrier USS Enterprise and her escort of cruisers and destroyers in the mid-Pacific Ocean north of Hawaii. If the Japanese attacked, Enterprise's fighters and scout planes would protect the task force, since Hornet's fighters were stowed below decks to make space for the B-25s.

The combined force was two carriers (Hornet and Enterprise), three heavy cruisers (Salt Lake City, Northampton, Vincennes), one light cruiser (Nashville), eight destroyers (Balch, Fanning, Benham, Ellet, Gwin, Meredith, Grayson, Monssen), and two fleet oilers (Cimarron and Sabine). The ships proceeded in radio silence. On the afternoon of April 17th, the slow oilers refueled the task force, then withdrew with the destroyers to the east while the carriers and cruisers dashed west at 20 knots (37 km/h; 23 mph) toward their intended launch point in enemy-controlled waters east of Japan.

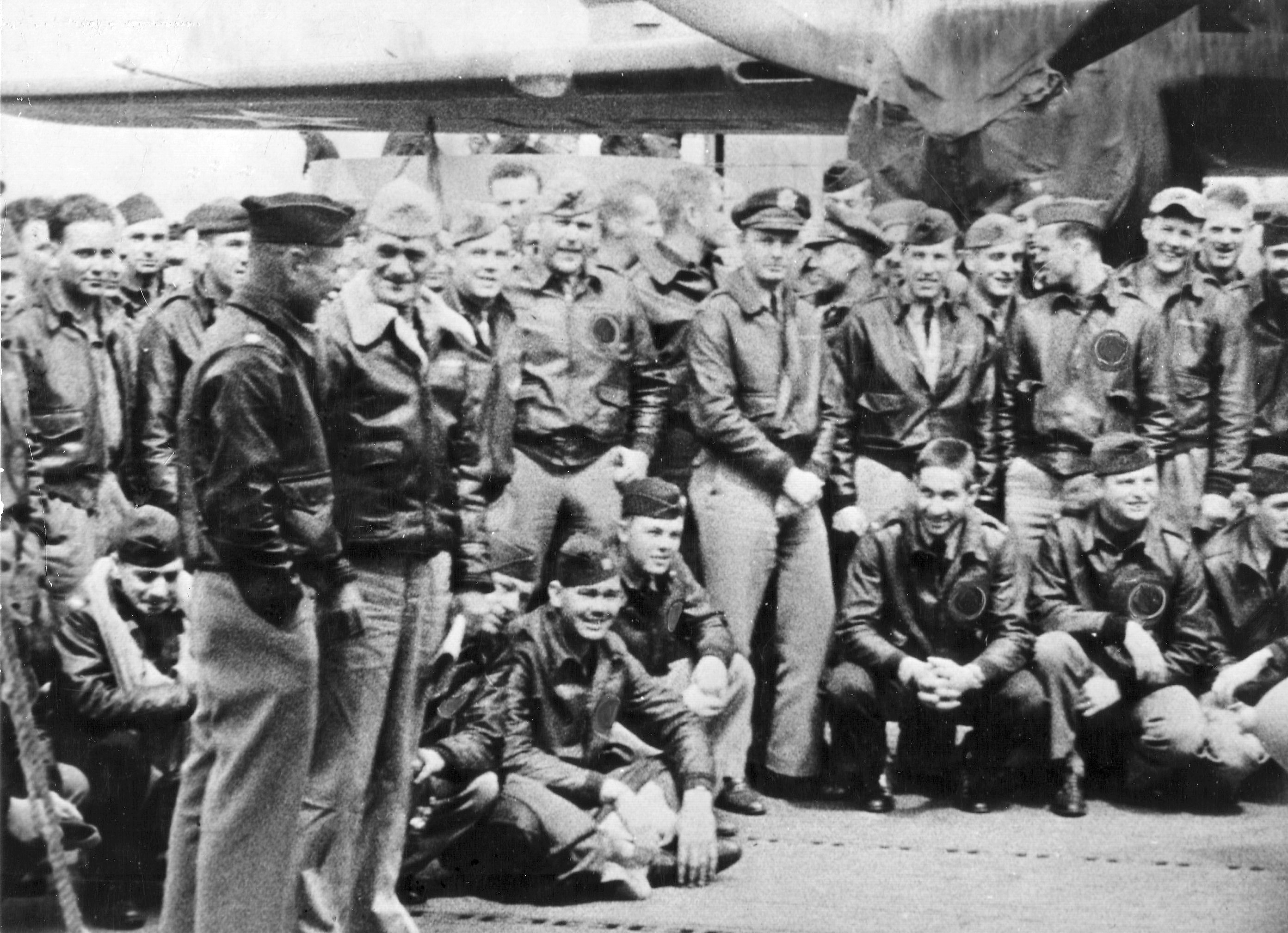
Orders in hand, Navy Captain Marc Mitscher, skipper of USS Hornet, chats with Lt. Col. James Doolittle.

At 07:38 on the morning of April 18th, while the task force was still about 650 nautical miles (1,200 km; 750 mi) from Japan (around 35°N 154°E), it was sighted by the Japanese picket boat No. 23 Nittō Maru, a 70-ton patrol craft, which radioed an attack warning to Japan. The boat was sunk by gunfire from Nashville. (Note: The order to Nashville did not go out until 07:52. Heavy seas made hitting the picket boat difficult even with rapid fire, and it was not sunk until 08:23.) The chief petty officer who captained the boat killed himself rather than be captured, but five of the 11 crew were picked up by Nashville.

Doolittle and Hornet skipper Captain Marc Mitscher decided to launch the B-25s immediately—10 hours early and 170 nautical miles (310 km; 200 mi) farther from Japan than planned. (Note: Doolittle, first off, was 610 nautical miles (1,130 km; 702 mi) from Tokyo at launch, while Farrow, last off, was 600 nautical miles (1,110 km; 690 mi) from landfall.) After respotting to allow for engine start and runups, Doolittle's aircraft had 467 feet (142 m) of takeoff distance. Although none of the B-25 pilots, including Doolittle, had ever taken off from a carrier before, all 16 aircraft launched safely between 08:20 and 09:19, though Doolittle's bomber was witnessed to have almost hit the water before pulling up at the last second. The B-25s then flew toward Japan, most in groups of two to four aircraft, before flying singly at wave-top level to avoid detection.

The aircraft began arriving over Japan about noon Tokyo time, six hours after launch, climbed to 1,500 feet (460 m) and bombed 10 military and industrial targets in Tokyo, two in Yokohama, and one each in Yokosuka, Nagoya, Kobe, and Osaka. Although some B-25s encountered light antiaircraft fire and a few enemy fighters (made up of Ki-45s and prototype Ki-61s, the latter being mistaken for Bf 109s) over Japan, no bomber was shot down. Only the B-25 of 1st Lt. Richard O. Joyce received any battle damage, minor hits from antiaircraft fire. B-25 No. 4, piloted by 1st Lt. Everett W. Holstrom, jettisoned its bombs before reaching its target when it came under attack by fighters after its gun turret malfunctioned.

The Americans claimed to have shot down three Japanese fighters—one by the gunners of the Whirling Dervish, piloted by 1st Lt. Harold Watson, and two by the gunners of the Hari Kari-er, piloted by 1st Lt. Ross Greening. Many targets were strafed by the bombers' nose gunners. The subterfuge of the simulated gun barrels mounted in the tail cones was described afterwards by Doolittle as effective, in that no airplane was attacked directly from behind.

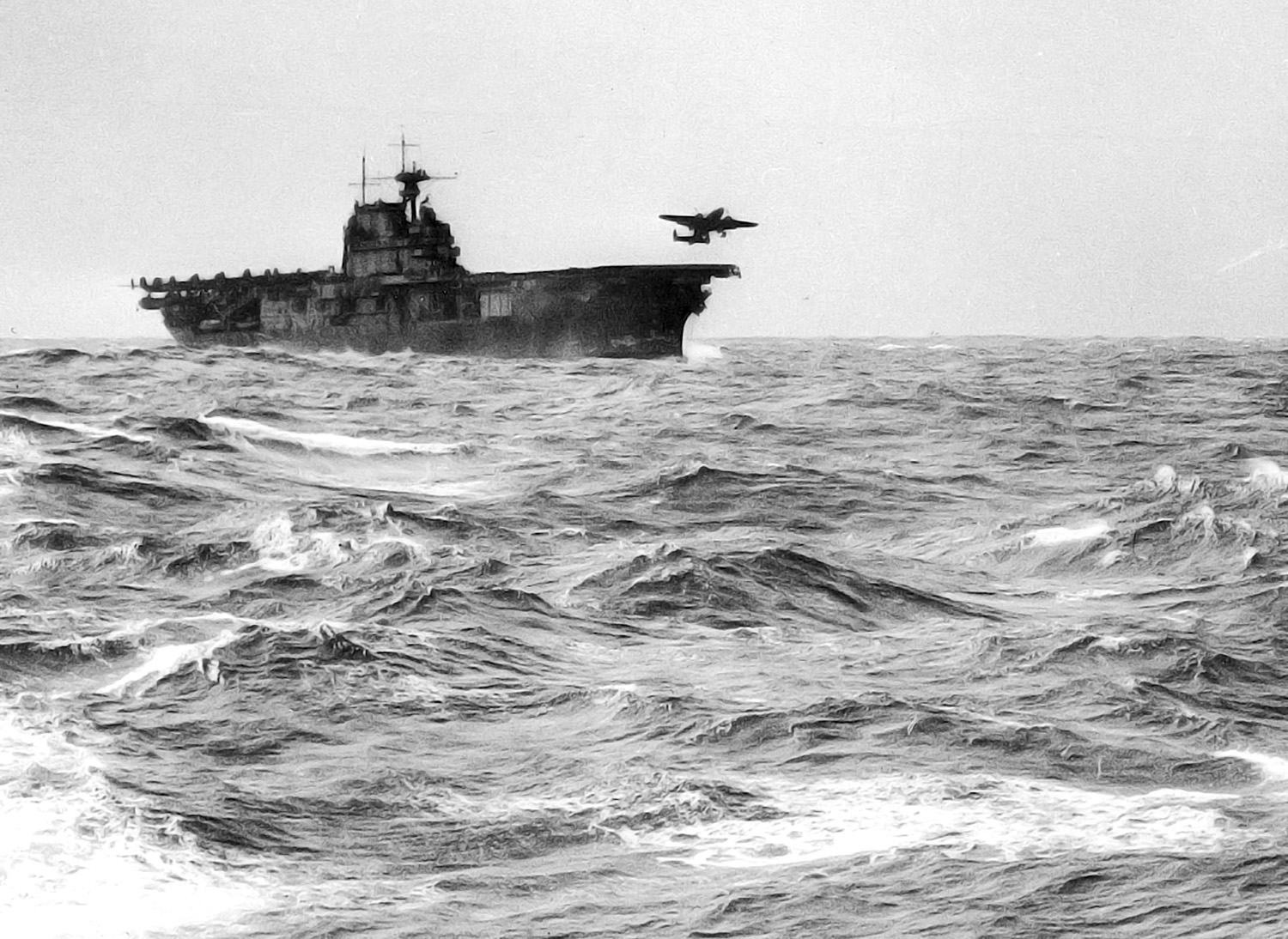
One of the Doolittle raiders launching, 18 April 1942

Fifteen of the 16 aircraft then proceeded southwest off the southeastern coast of Japan and across the East China Sea toward eastern China. One B-25, piloted by Captain Edward J. York, was extremely low on fuel, and headed instead for the Soviet Union rather than be forced to ditch in the middle of the East China Sea. Several fields in Zhejiang province were supposed to be ready to guide them in using homing beacons, then recover and refuel them for continuing on to Chongqing, the wartime Kuomintang capital. The primary base was at Zhuzhou, toward which all the aircraft navigated, but Halsey never sent the planned signal to alert them, apparently because of a possible threat to the task force. (Note: The carburetors of the B-25s had been carefully adjusted and bench-marked at Eglin Field for maximum fuel efficiency in low level flight. Without Doolittle's knowledge and in violation of his orders, both carburetors on York's plane had been replaced by depot workers in Sacramento. The change was not discovered until the raiders were at sea, and the extra flying distance caused by the premature launch meant that the B-25 had no chance of reaching the Chinese coast. York, Doolittle's operations officer and the only West Pointer among the raiders, made decision in flight to divert to the closer USSR.)

The raiders faced several unforeseen challenges during their flight to China: night was approaching, the aircraft were running low on fuel, and the weather was rapidly deteriorating. None would have reached China if not for a tail wind as they came off the target, which increased their ground speed by 25 kn (46 km/h; 29 mph) for seven hours. The crews realized they would probably not be able to reach their intended bases in China, leaving them the option of either bailing out over eastern China or crash-landing along the Chinese coast. (Note: Doolittle's after-action report stated that some B-25s were heard overflying the bases, but because the Chinese had not been alerted to the attack, they assumed it was a Japanese air raid.)

All 15 aircraft reached the Chinese coast after 13 hours of flight and crash-landed or the crews bailed out. One crewman, 20-year-old Corporal Leland D. Faktor, flight engineer/gunner with 1st Lt. Robert M. Gray, was killed during his bailout attempt over China, the only man in that crew to be lost. Two crews (10 men) were missing.

The 16th aircraft, commanded by Capt. Edward York (eighth off – AC #40-2242) flew to the Soviet Union and landed 40 miles (64 km) beyond Vladivostok at Vozdvizhenka. As the USSR was not at war with Japan, and the Soviet–Japanese Neutrality Pact was officially in force, the Soviet government was officially unable to immediately repatriate any Allied personnel involved in hostilities who entered Soviet territory. Furthermore, at the time, the Soviet Far East was vulnerable to military action by Japanese forces. Consequently, in accordance with international law, the crew members were interned, despite official US requests for their release, and the B-25 was impounded. York would later report that he and his crew had been treated well by the Soviet authorities. Several months later, they were moved to Ashgabat (Ashkhabad), in what was then the Turkmen Soviet Socialist Republic, 20 miles (32 km) from the Soviet-Iranian border. In mid-1943, they were allowed to cross the border into Allied-occupied Iran. The Americans presented themselves to a British consulate on May 11, 1943. A cover story was concocted that York had bribed a smuggler to assist them in escaping from Soviet custody. The fact that the "smuggling" had been staged by the NKVD was later confirmed by declassified Soviet archives.

Doolittle and his crew, after parachuting into China, received assistance from Chinese soldiers and civilians, as well as John Birch, an American missionary in China. As did the others who participated in the mission, Doolittle had to bail out, but he landed in a heap of dung (saving a previously injured ankle from breaking) in a paddy in China near Quzhou. The mission was the longest ever flown in combat by the B-25 Mitchell medium bomber, averaging about 2,250 nautical miles (4,170 km).

== Aftermath ==
=== Fate of the crewmen ===
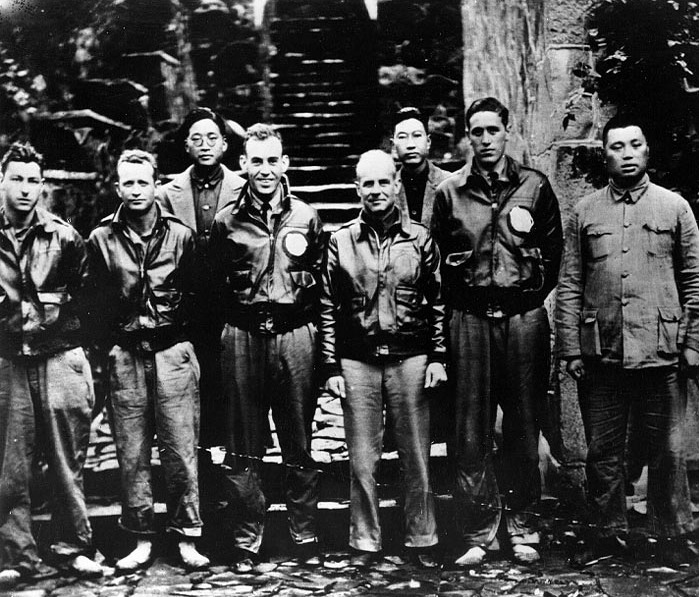
Lt. Col. Doolittle with members of his flight crew and Chinese officials in China after the attack. From left to right: Staff Sgt. Fred A. Braemer, bombardier; Staff Sgt. Paul J. Leonard, flight engineer/gunner; Chao Foo Ki, secretary of the Western Chekiang Province Branch Government. 1st Lt. Richard E. Cole, copilot; Doolittle; Henry H. Shen, bank manager; Lt. Henry A. Potter, navigator; General Ho, director of the Branch Government of Western Chekiang Province.

Following the Doolittle Raid, most of the B-25 crews who had reached China eventually found safety with the help of Chinese civilians and soldiers. Of the 16 planes and 80 airmen who participated in the raid, all either crash-landed, were ditched, or crashed after their crews bailed out, with the single exception of Capt. York and his crew, who landed in the Soviet Union. Despite the loss of these 15 aircraft, 69 airmen escaped capture or death, with three killed in action. When the Chinese helped the Americans escape, the grateful Americans, in turn, gave them whatever they had on hand. Eight Raiders were captured. Some of the men who crashed were aided by Patrick Cleary, the Irish Bishop of Nancheng. The Japanese troops retaliated by burning down the city.

==== Missing crewmen ====
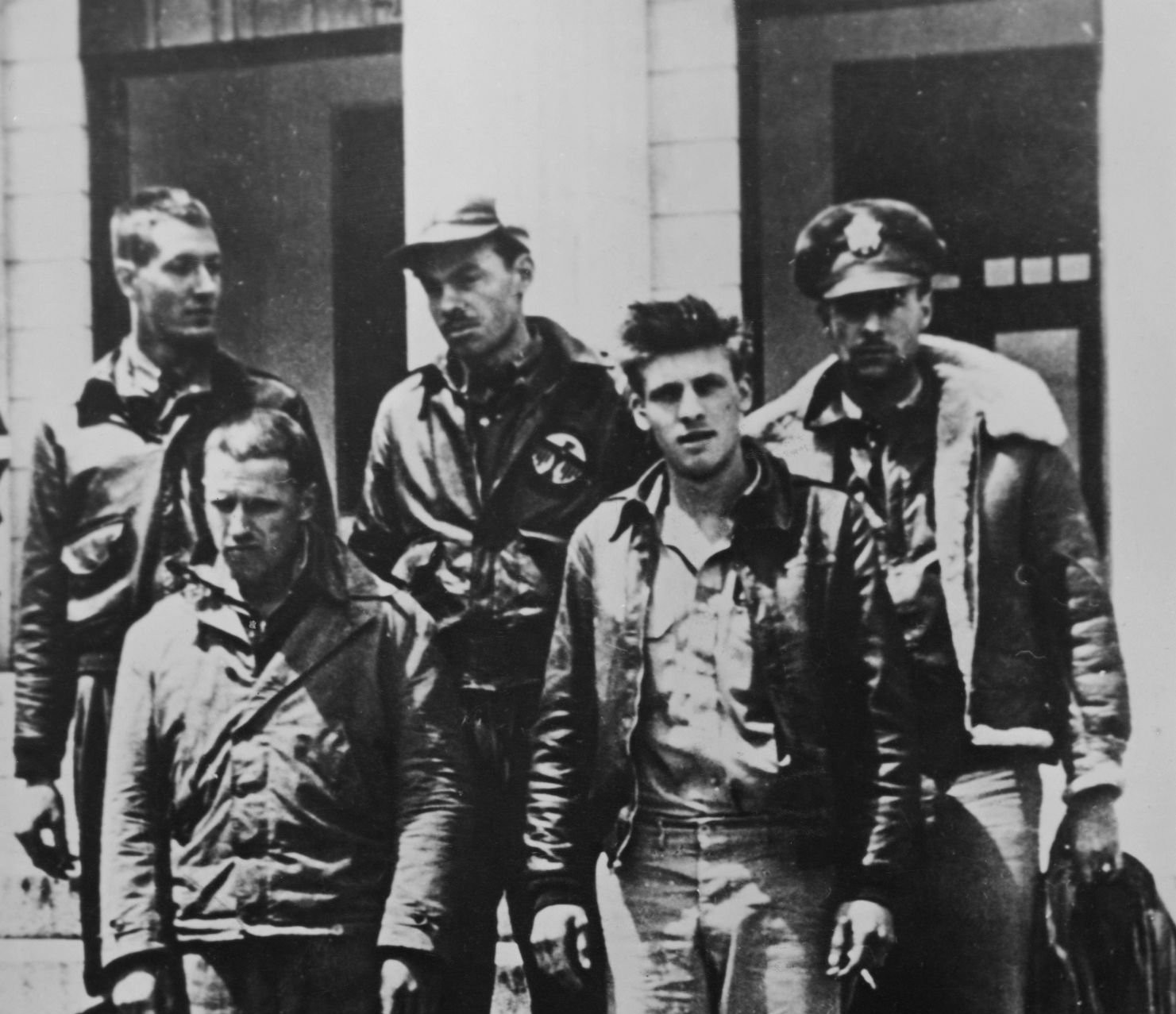
Crew 16 in Nanchang following their capture by the Japanese (20 April 1942)

The crews of two aircraft (10 men in total) were unaccounted for: those of 1st Lt. Dean E. Hallmark (sixth off) and 1st Lt. William G. Farrow (last off). On 15 August 1942, the United States learned from the Swiss Consulate General in Shanghai that eight of the missing crew members were prisoners of the Japanese at the city's police headquarters. Two of the missing crewmen, bombardier S/Sgt. William J. Dieter and flight engineer Sgt. Donald E. Fitzmaurice of Hallmark's crew, were found to have drowned when their B-25 crashed into the sea. Both of their remains were recovered after the war and were buried with military honors at Golden Gate National Cemetery.

The other eight were captured: 1st Lt. Dean E. Hallmark, 1st Lt. William G. Farrow, 1st Lt. Robert J. Meder, 1st Lt. Chase Nielsen, 1st Lt. Robert L. Hite, 2nd Lt. George Barr, Cpl. Harold A. Spatz, and Cpl. Jacob DeShazer. All eight captured in Jiangxi were tried and sentenced to death at a military trial in China, and then transported to Tokyo. There the Army Ministry reviewed their case, with five of the sentences being commuted and the other three being executed. Out of the 80 crewmen, three were killed in action, eight were captured, and three were killed in captivity by the Japanese.

The surviving captured airmen remained in military confinement on a starvation diet, their health rapidly deteriorating. In April 1943, they were moved to Nanjing, where Meder died on December 1, 1943. The remaining men—Nielsen, Hite, Barr and DeShazer—eventually began receiving slightly better treatment and were given a copy of the Bible and a few other books. They were freed by American troops in August 1945. Four Japanese officers were tried for war crimes against the captured Doolittle Raiders, found guilty, and sentenced to hard labor, three for five years and one for nine years. Barr had been near death when liberated and remained in China recuperating until October, by which time he had begun to experience severe emotional problems. Untreated after transfer to Letterman Army Hospital and a military hospital in Clinton, Iowa, Barr became suicidal and was held virtually incommunicado until November, when Doolittle's personal intervention resulted in treatment that led to his recovery. DeShazer graduated from Seattle Pacific University in 1948 and returned to Japan as a missionary, where he served for over 30 years.

When their remains were recovered after the war, Farrow, Hallmark, and Meder were buried with full military honors at Arlington National Cemetery. Spatz was buried with military honors at National Memorial Cemetery of the Pacific. Of the surviving prisoners, Barr died of heart failure in 1967, Nielsen in 2007, DeShazer on March 15, 2008, and the last, Hite, died March 29, 2015.

==== Service of returning crewmen ====
Doolittle receiving the Medal of Honor in 1942 from President Roosevelt in a ceremony attended by (standing, L–R) Lt. Gen. H. H. Arnold, Josephine Doolittle, and Gen. George C. Marshall

Immediately following the raid, Doolittle told his crew that he believed the loss of all 16 aircraft, coupled with the relatively minor damage to targets, had rendered the attack a failure, and that he expected a court-martial upon his return to the United States. Instead, the raid bolstered American morale. Doolittle was promoted two grades to brigadier general on April 28th while still in China, skipping the rank of colonel, and was presented with the Medal of Honor by Roosevelt upon his return to the United States in June. When General Doolittle toured the growing Eglin Field facility in July 1942 with commanding officer Col. Grandison Gardner, the local paper of record (the Okaloosa News-Journal, Crestview, Florida), while reporting his presence, made no mention of his still-secret recent training at Eglin. He went on to command the Twelfth Air Force in North Africa, the Fifteenth Air Force in the Mediterranean, and the Eighth Air Force in England during the next three years.

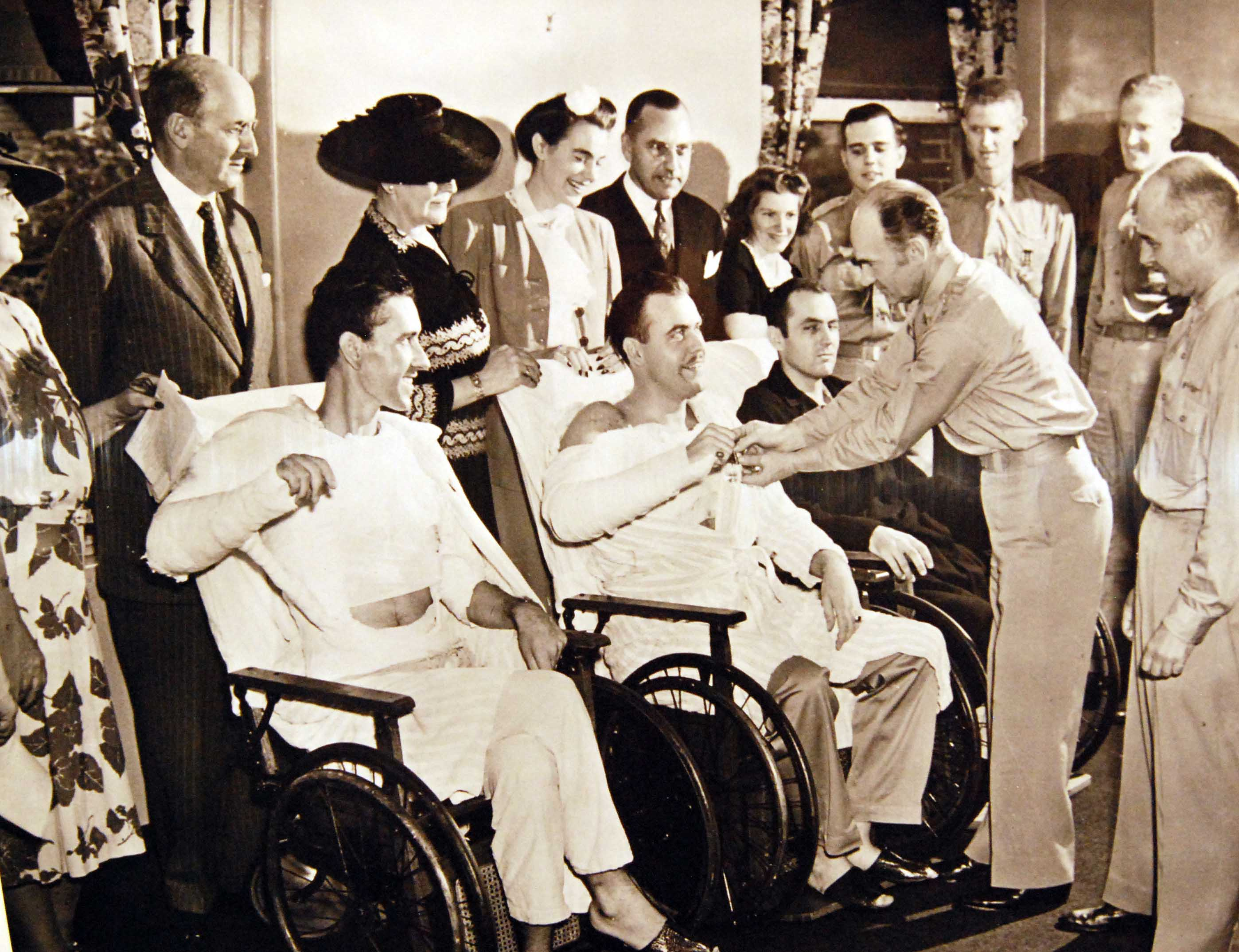
An injured pilot receiving the Distinguished Flying Cross at Walter Reed Hospital from Maj. Gen. Millard F. Harmon in 1942

All 80 Raiders were awarded the Distinguished Flying Cross, and those who were killed or wounded during the raid were awarded the Purple Heart. Every Doolittle Raider was also decorated by the Chinese government. In addition, Corporal David J. Thatcher (a flight engineer/gunner on Lawson's crew) and 1st Lt. Thomas R. White (flight surgeon/gunner with Smith) were awarded the Silver Star for helping the wounded crew members of Lt. Lawson's crew to evade Japanese troops in China. Finally, as Doolittle noted in his autobiography, he successfully insisted that all of the Raiders receive a promotion.

Twenty-eight of the crewmen remained in the China Burma India theater, including the entire crews of planes 4, 10, and 13, flying missions, most for more than a year; five were killed in action. (Note: 27 of the 28 flew B-25 combat missions with the 7th and 341st Bomb Groups. Three died on June 3, 1942 when their B-25s collided with a mountain in poor weather after bombing Lashio airfield in Burma, and two others on 18 October in the takeoff crash of their B-25 from Dinjan, India, on a bombing mission. 2nd Lt. Richard E. Cole, Doolittle's co-pilot, volunteered to fly air transport missions over the Hump, which he did until May 1943, earning a second DFC.) Nineteen crew members flew combat missions in the Mediterranean theater after returning to the United States, four of whom were killed in action and four becoming prisoners of war. (Note: Jones, pilot of plane 5, flew missions in both the CBI and the Mediterranean, and was one of the four POWs.) Nine crew members served in the European Theater of Operations; one was killed in action, and one, David M. "Davy" Jones, was shot down and became a POW in Stalag Luft III at Sagan, where he played a part in The Great Escape. Altogether, 12 of the survivors died in air crashes within 15 months of the raid. Two survivors were separated from the USAAF in 1944 due to the severity of their injuries.

The 17th Bomb Group, from which the Doolittle Raiders had been recruited, received replacement crews and transferred to Barksdale Army Air Field in June 1942, where it converted to Martin B-26 Marauder medium bombers. In November 1942, it deployed overseas to North Africa, where it operated in the Mediterranean Theater of Operations with the Twelfth Air Force for the remainder of the war.

=== Zhejiang-Jiangxi campaign ===
After the raid, the Japanese Imperial Army began the Zhejiang-Jiangxi campaign (also known as Operation Sei-go) to prevent these eastern coastal provinces of China from being used again for an attack on Japan and to take revenge on the Chinese people. An area of some 20,000 sq mi (50,000 km^{2}) was laid waste. "Like a swarm of locusts, they left behind nothing but destruction and chaos", eyewitness Father Wendelin Dunker wrote. The Japanese killed an estimated 10,000 Chinese civilians during their search for Doolittle's men. People who aided the airmen were tortured before they were killed. Father Dunker wrote of the destruction of the town of Ihwang: "They shot any man, woman, child, cow, hog, or just about anything that moved, They raped any woman from the ages of 10–65, and before burning the town they thoroughly looted it ... None of the humans shot were buried either". The Japanese entered Nancheng (Jiangxi), population 50,000 on June 11, "beginning a reign of terror so horrendous that missionaries would later dub it 'the Rape of Nancheng'", evoking memories of the infamous Rape of Nanjing five years before. Less than a month later, the Japanese forces put what remained of the city to the torch. "This planned burning was carried on for three days," one Chinese newspaper reported, "and the city of Nancheng became charred earth."

When Japanese troops moved out of the Zhejiang and Jiangxi areas in mid-August, they left behind a trail of devastation. The Imperial Japanese Army had also spread cholera, typhoid, plague infected fleas and dysentery pathogens. The Japanese biological warfare Unit 731 brought almost 300 pounds (140 kg) of paratyphoid and anthrax to be left in contaminated food and contaminated wells with the withdrawal of the army from areas around Yushan, Kinhwa and Futsin. Around 1,700 Japanese troops died out of a total 10,000 Japanese soldiers who fell ill with disease when their biological weapons attack rebounded on their own forces. According to Chinese records, the campaign resulted in over 20,000 civilians murdered, 30,000 more captured or missing, and more than 100,000 houses burned in Quzhou alone.

Shunroku Hata, the commander of Japanese forces in the campaign was sentenced in 1948 in part due to his "failure to prevent atrocities". He was given a life sentence but was paroled in 1954.

=== Additional perspectives ===
Doolittle recounted in his autobiography that at the time he thought the mission was a failure and he would be demoted upon return to the US.

This mission showed that a B-25 takeoff from a carrier was easier than previously thought, and night operations could be possible in the future. Shuttle bombing runs (taking off and landing at different air bases) were shown to be an effective carrier task force tactic since there was no need for the ships to wait for the returning aircraft.

The American pilots, instead of landing as planned, were forced to bail out due to a lack of ground lighting to provide guidance. Chinese airfield crews recounted that due to the unexpected early arrival of the B-25s, homing beacon and runway torch lights were not on for fear of possible Japanese airstrikes (as had happened previously). If Claire Lee Chennault had been informed of the mission specifics, the outcome might have been very much better for the Americans: Chennault had built an effective air surveillance net in China that would have been able to provide updated arrival information about the raiders to the airfield crews, and could have confirmed that there was no risk of Japanese airstrikes, allowing the landing lights to be lit at the time necessary to allow safe landings.

Chiang Kai-Shek awarded the raiders China's highest military decorations, and predicted (in his diary) that Japan would alter its goals and strategy as a result of the disgrace. (Note: The diaries are in the Hoover Institute of Stanford University.) Indeed, the raid was a shock to staff at Japanese Imperial General Headquarters. As a direct consequence, Japan attacked territories in China to prevent similar shuttle bombing runs. High command withdrew substantial air force resources from supporting offensive operations in order to defend the home islands. The Aleutian Islands campaign was launched to prevent the US from using the islands as bomber bases to attack Japan—this required two carriers that otherwise would have been used for the Battle of Midway. Thus, the raid's most significant strategic accomplishment was that it compelled the Japanese high command into ordering a very inefficient disposition of their forces, and poor decision-making due to fear of attack, for the rest of the war.

Mitsuo Fuchida and Shigeyoshi Miwa considered the "one-way" raid "excellent strategy", with the bombers evading Army fighters by flying "much lower than anticipated". Kuroshima said the raid "passed like a shiver over Japan" and Miwa criticized the Army for claiming to have shot down nine aircraft rather than "not even one".

== Effect ==
1943 U.S. newsreel about the raid

Compared with the future devastating Boeing B-29 Superfortress attacks against Japan, the Doolittle raid did little material damage, and all of it was easily repaired. Preliminary reports stated 12 were killed and more than 100 were wounded. Eight primary and five secondary targets were struck. In Tokyo, the targets included an oil tank farm, a steel mill, and several power plants. In Yokosuka, at least one bomb from the B-25 piloted by 1st Lt. Edgar E. McElroy struck the nearly completed light carrier Ryūhō, delaying her launch until November. Six schools and an army hospital were also hit. Japanese officials reported the two aircraft whose crews were captured had struck their targets.

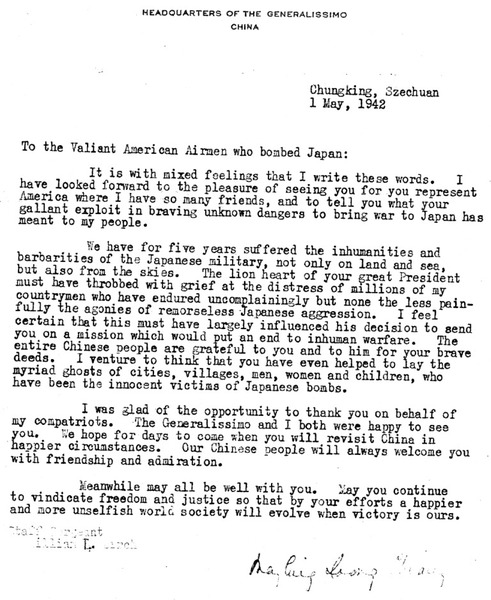
Letter of Gratitude to the Doolittle Raiders by the Government of the Republic of China and signed by Soong Mei-ling (1942)

Allied ambassadors and staff in Tokyo were still interned until agreement was reached about their repatriation via the neutral port of Lourenço Marques in Portuguese East Africa in June–July 1942. When Joseph Grew (US) realized the low-flying planes overhead were American (not Japanese planes on maneuvers) he thought they may have flown from the Aleutian Islands. The Japanese press claimed that nine had been shot down, but there were no pictures of crashed planes. Embassy staff were "very happy and proud" and the British said that they "drank toasts all day to the American flyers". Sir Robert Craigie, the interned British Ambassador to Japan who was under house arrest in Tokyo at the time, said that Japanese staff had been amused at the embassy's air raid precautions as the idea of an attack on Tokyo was "laughable" with the Allies in retreat, but the guards now showed "considerable excitement and perturbation". Several false alarms followed, and in poorer districts people rushed into the streets shouting and gesticulating, losing their normal "iron control" over their emotions and showing a "tendency to panic". The police guards on Allied and neutral missions were doubled to foil reprisal attacks; and the guard on the German mission was tripled.

Despite the minimal damage inflicted, American morale, still reeling from the attack on Pearl Harbor and Japan's subsequent territorial gains, soared when news of the raid was released. The Japanese press was told to describe the attack as a cruel, indiscriminate bombing against civilians, including women and children. After the war, the casualty count was 87 dead, 151 serious injuries, and more than 311 minor injuries; children were among those killed, and newspapers asked their parents to share their opinion on how the captured raiders should be treated.

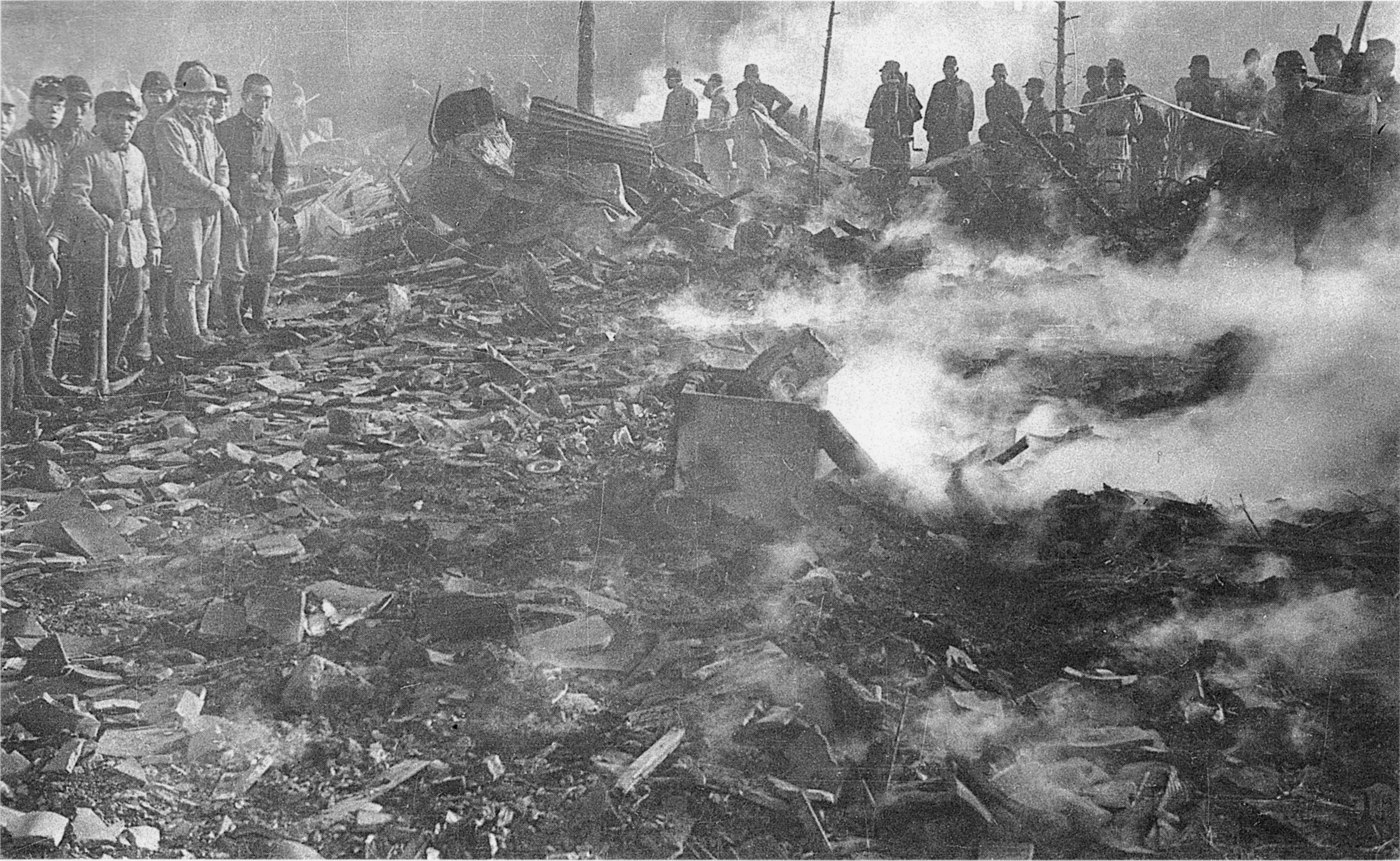
A destroyed house in Oku, Tokyo, in which a family of six was killed

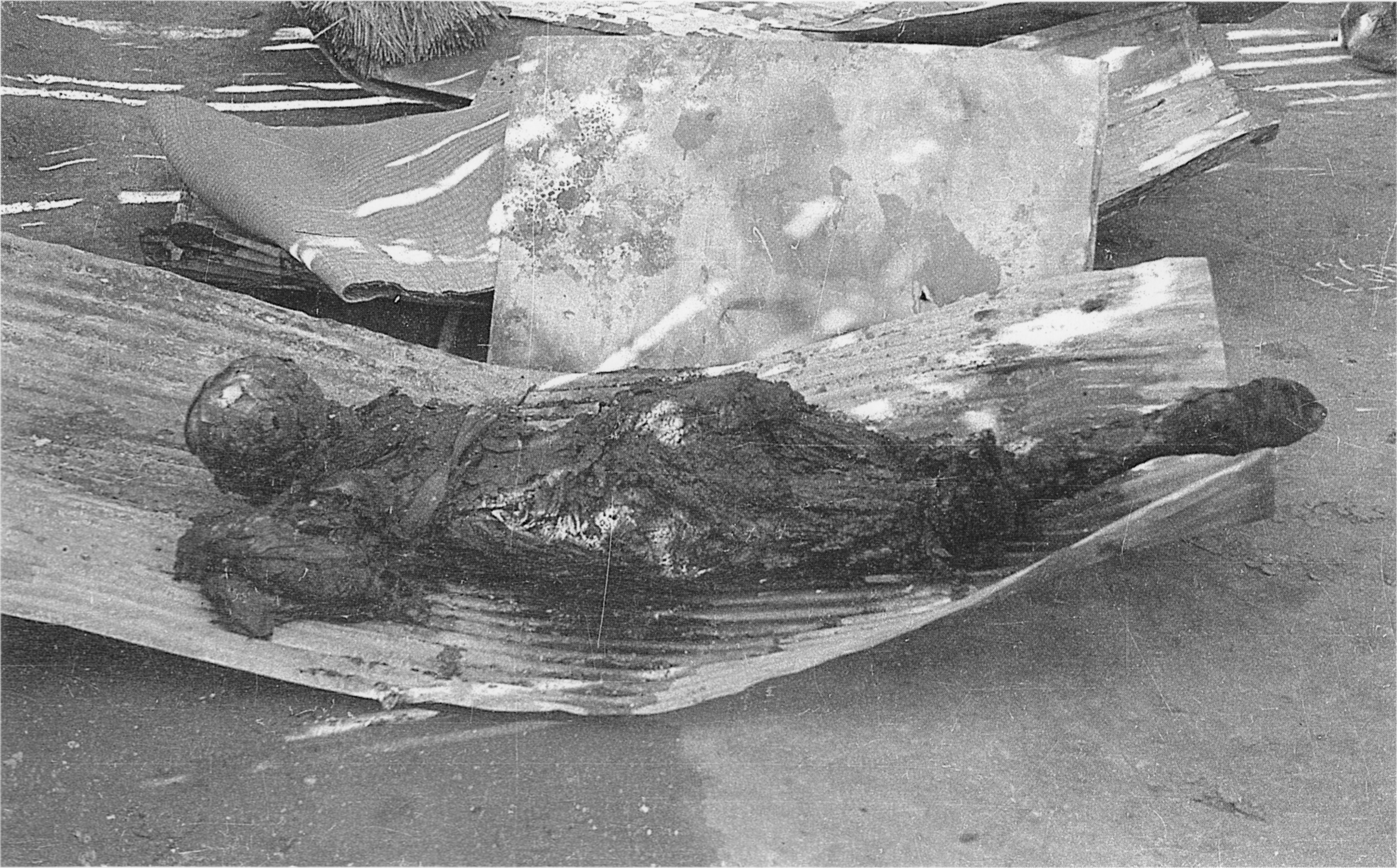
Remains of a 24-year-old woman and her infant child killed in the raid

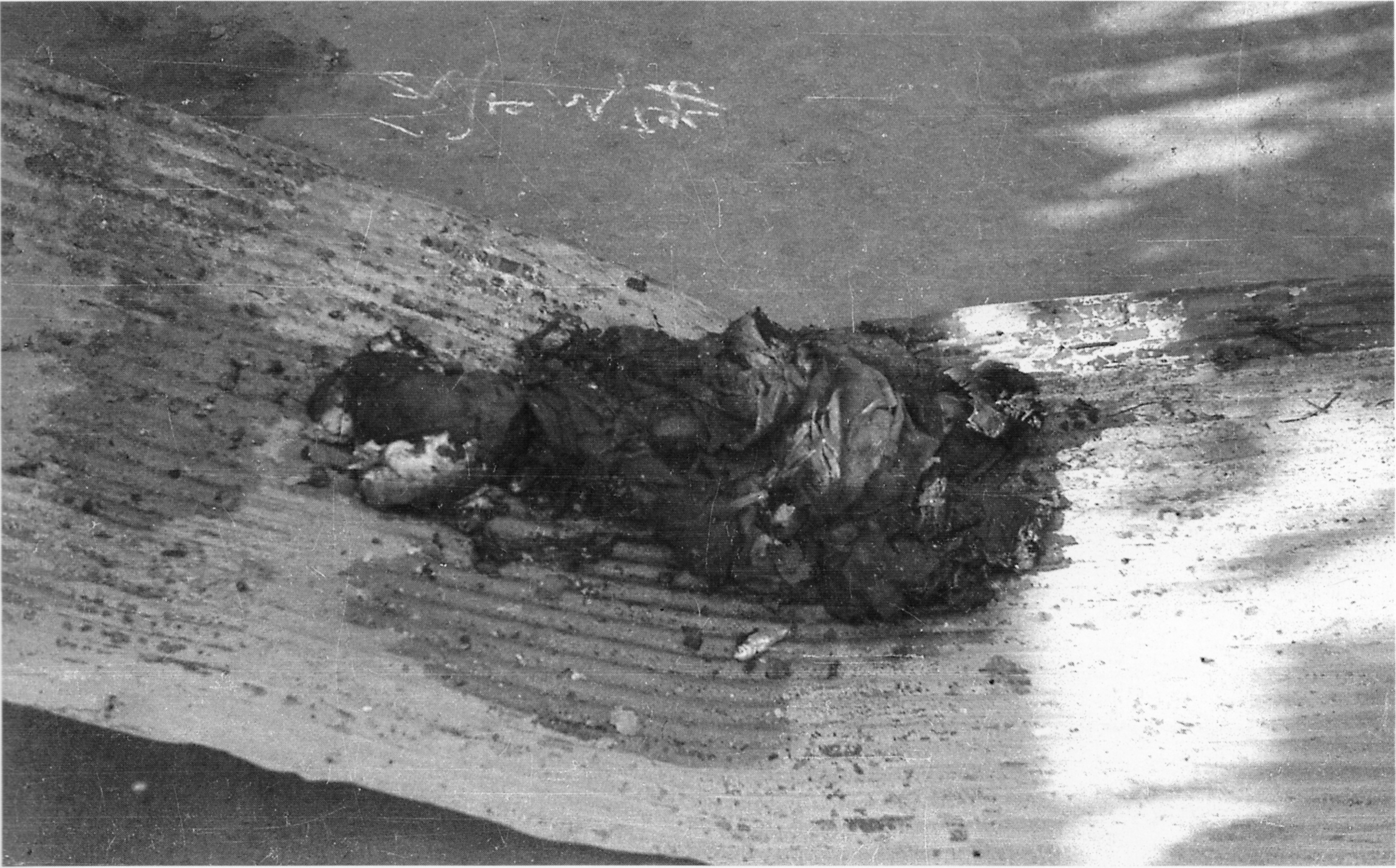
Remains of a 2-year-old child killed in the raid

The Japanese Navy attempted to locate and pursue the American task force. The Second Fleet, its main striking force, was near Formosa, returning from the Indian Ocean Raid to refit and replace its air losses. Spearheaded by five aircraft carriers and its best naval aircraft and aircrews, the Second Fleet was immediately ordered to locate and destroy the U.S. carrier force, but failed to do so, due to the American fleet choosing to head back to Hawaii (had they stayed after all, they would've found themselves attacked by the carriers Akagi, Sōryū and Hiryū). Nagumo and his staff on Akagi heard that an American force was near Japan but expected an attack on the next day.

The Imperial Japanese Navy also bore a special responsibility for allowing an American aircraft carrier force to approach the Japanese Home Islands in a manner similar to the IJN fleet to Hawaii in 1941, and permitting it to escape undamaged. (Note: The Japanese, through a small amount of intercepted radio traffic between Halsey and Mitscher, were aware that an American carrier force was at large in the Western Pacific Ocean and could possibly attack Japan.) The fact that B-25 bombers—normally land-based aircraft—carried out the attack confused the IJN's high command. This confusion and the knowledge that Japan was now vulnerable to air attack strengthened Yamamoto's resolve to destroy the American carrier fleet, which was not present in the Pearl Harbor Attack, resulting in a decisive Japanese defeat several weeks later at the Battle of Midway.

It was hoped that the damage done would be both material and psychological. Material damage was to be the destruction of specific targets with ensuing confusion and retardation of production. The psychological results, it was hoped, would be the recalling of combat equipment from other theaters for home defense thus effecting relief in those theaters, the development of a fear complex in Japan, improved relationships with our Allies, and a favorable reaction on the American people.

— General James H. Doolittle, July 9, 1942.

After the raid the Americans were worried in April about the "still very badly undermanned west coast" and Chief of Staff George Marshall discussed a "possible attack by the Japanese upon our plants in San Diego and then a flight by those Japs down into Mexico after they have made their attack". So Secretary Stimson asked State to "touch base with their people south of the border", and Marshall flew to the West Coast on May 22nd.

An unusual consequence of the raid came after when—in the interests of secrecy—President Roosevelt answered a reporter's question by saying that the raid had been launched from "Shangri-La", the fictional faraway land of the James Hilton novel Lost Horizon. The true details of the raid were revealed to the public one year later, in April 1943. The Navy, in 1944, commissioned the Essex-class aircraft carrier USS Shangri-La, with Doolittle's wife Josephine as the sponsor.

== After the war ==
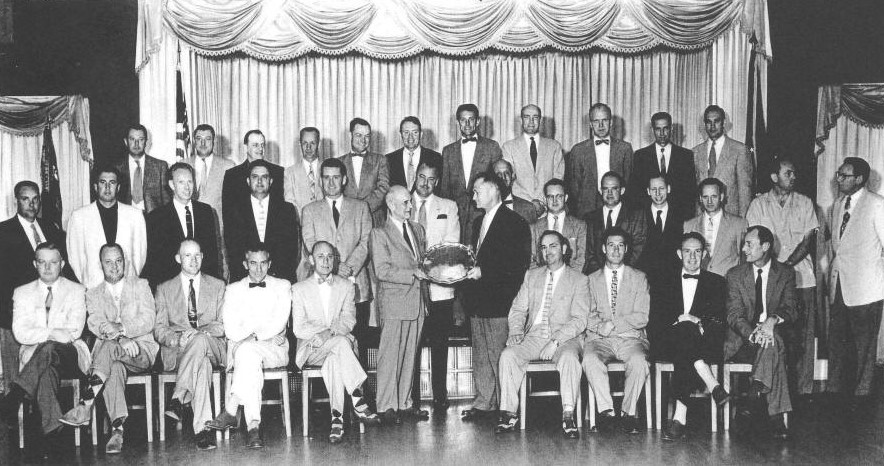
Members of the Doolittle Raid at the 15th anniversary reunion at Fort Walton Beach, Florida, in 1957

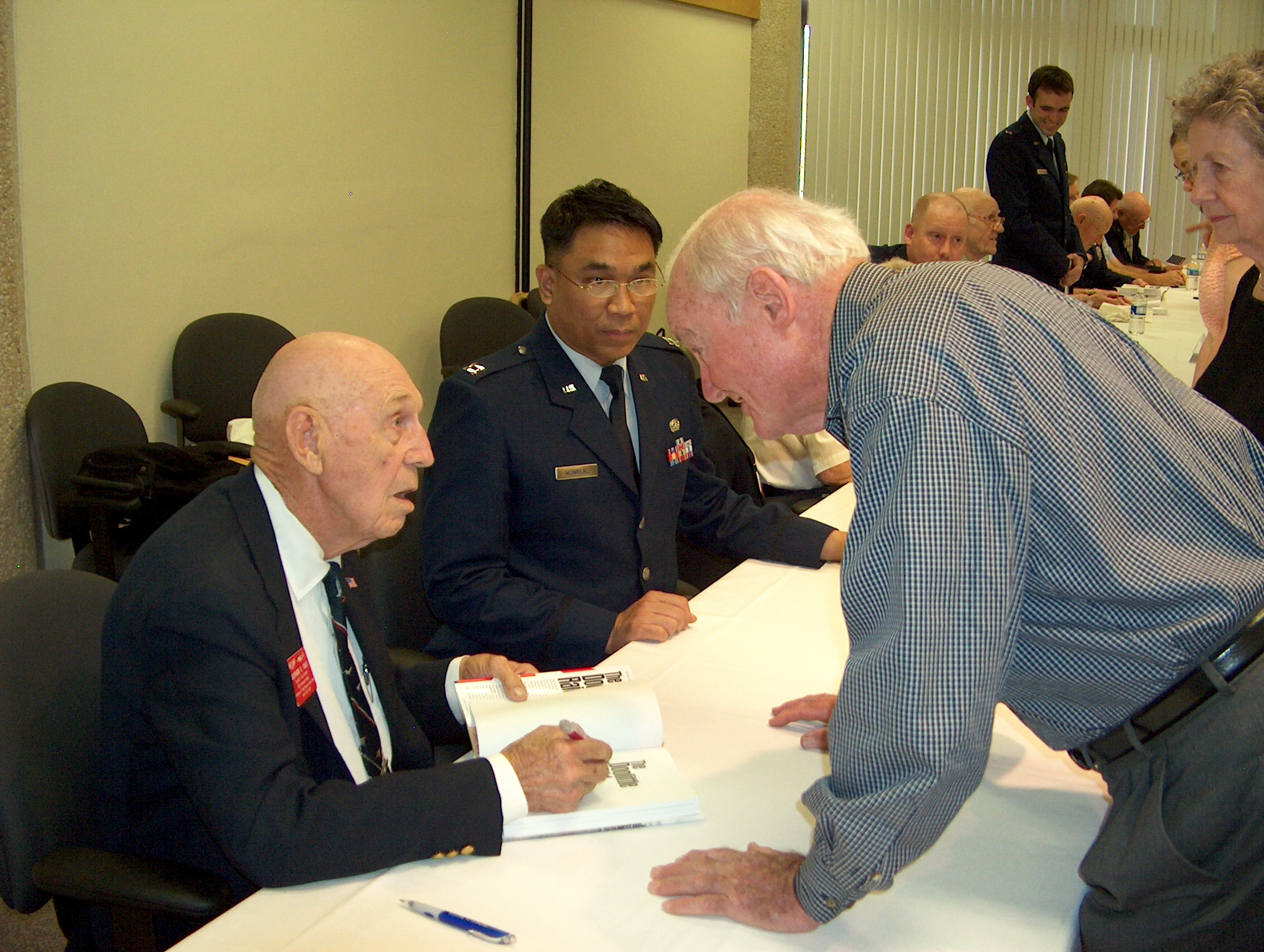
WWII Army veteran George A. McCalpin (right) talking to Lt. Col. Richard E. Cole (seated) about McCalpin's cousin, raider Sgt. William 'Billy Jack' Dieter, at the 66th anniversary reunion at the University of Texas at Dallas in April 2008

External videos
- Panel discussion with William Bower, Richard E. Cole, Thomas Griffin, Edwin Horton, and C. V. Glines, 10 November 2006, C-SPAN

The Doolittle Raiders held an annual reunion almost every year from the late 1940s to 2013. The high point of each reunion was a solemn, private ceremony in which the surviving Raiders performed a roll call, then toasted their fellow Raiders who had died during the previous year. Specially engraved silver goblets, one for each of the 80 Raiders, were used for this toast; the goblets of those who had died were inverted. Each Raider's name was engraved on his goblet both right side up and upside down. The Raiders drank a toast using a bottle of cognac that accompanied the goblets to each Raider reunion. In 2013, the remaining Raiders decided to hold their last public reunion at Fort Walton Beach, Florida, not far from Eglin Air Force Base, where they trained for the original mission. The bottle and the goblets had been maintained by the United States Air Force Academy on display in Arnold Hall, the cadet social center, until 2006. On April 19, 2006, these memorabilia were transferred to the National Museum of the United States Air Force at Wright-Patterson AFB, Ohio.

On April 18, 2013, a final reunion for the surviving Raiders was held at Eglin Air Force Base, with Robert Hite the only surviving member unable to attend.

The "final toast to fallen comrades" by the surviving raiders took place at the NMUSAF on November 9, 2013, preceded by a B-25 flyover, and was attended by Richard Cole, Edward Saylor, and David Thatcher.

Seven other men, including Lt. Miller and raider historian Col. Carroll V. Glines, are considered honorary Raiders for their efforts for the mission.

The Children of the Doolittle Raiders organization was founded on April 18, 2006, authorized by the Doolittle Raiders organization and the surviving members at the time. Descendants of the Doolittle Raiders organize fundraisers for a scholarship fund and continue to organize the Doolittle Raiders reunions. The 2019 reunion was held at Lt. Col. Richard E. Cole's memorial service.

=== Last surviving airmen ===
Col. Bill Bower, the last surviving Doolittle raider aircraft commander, died on January 10, 2011 at age 93 in Boulder, Colorado.

Lt. Col. Edward Saylor, the then-enlisted engineer/gunner of aircraft No. 15 during the raid, died January 28, 2015 of natural causes at his home in Sumner, Washington, at the age of 94.

Lt. Col. Robert L. Hite, co-pilot of aircraft No. 16, died at a nursing home in Nashville, Tennessee, at the age of 95 on March 29, 2015. Hite was the last living prisoner of the Doolittle Raid.

S/Sgt. David J. Thatcher, gunner of aircraft No. 7, died on June 22, 2016 in Missoula, Montana, at the age of 94.

Lt Col. Richard E. Cole, Doolittle's copilot in aircraft No. 1, was the last surviving Doolittle Raider and the only one to live to an older age than Doolittle, who died in 1993 at age 96. (Note: Frank Kappeler and Thomas Griffin also lived to age 96, but did not live as many months as Doolittle.) Cole was the only Raider still alive when the wreckage of Hornet was found in late January 2019 by the research vessel Petrel at a depth of more than 17,000 feet (5,200 m) off the Solomon Islands. Cole died April 9, 2019, at the age of 103.

=== Doolittle Raid exhibits ===
The most extensive display of Doolittle Raid memorabilia is at the National Museum of the United States Air Force (on Wright-Patterson Air Force Base) in Dayton, Ohio. The centerpiece is a like-new B-25, which is painted and marked as Doolittle's aircraft, 40-2344, (rebuilt by North American Aviation to B-25B configuration from an F-10D photo reconnaissance version of the B-25D). The bomber, which North American Aviation presented to the Raiders in 1958, rests on a reproduction of Hornet's flight deck. Several authentically dressed mannequins surround the aircraft, including representations of Doolittle, Hornet Captain Marc Mitscher, and groups of Army and Navy men loading the bomber's bombs and ammunition. Also exhibited are the silver goblets used by the Raiders at each of their annual reunions, pieces of flight clothing and personal equipment, a parachute used by one of the Raiders in his bailout over China, and group photographs of all 16 crews, and other items.

The last B-25 to be retired from the U.S. Air Force inventory is displayed at the Air Force Armament Museum at Eglin AFB, also in the markings of Gen. Doolittle's aircraft.

A fragment of the wreckage of one of the aircraft, and the medals awarded to Doolittle, are on display at the Smithsonian National Air and Space Museum in Washington, DC.

The 2006 Pacific Aviation Museum Pearl Harbor on Ford Island, Oʻahu, Hawaii, also has a 1942 exhibit in which the centerpiece is a restored B-25 in the markings of The Ruptured Duck used on the Doolittle Raid.

The San Marcos, Texas, chapter of the Commemorative Air Force has in its museum the armor plate from the pilot seat of the B-25 Doolittle flew in the raid.

The interchange of Edmund Highway (South Carolina 302) and Interstate 26 nearest the former Columbia Army Air Base is designated the Doolittle Raiders Interchange.

In China, a memorial hall honoring the Doolittle Raiders and the Chinese who provided them with assistance in aftermath of the raid is located at the city of Jiangshan in Quzhou, Zhejiang.

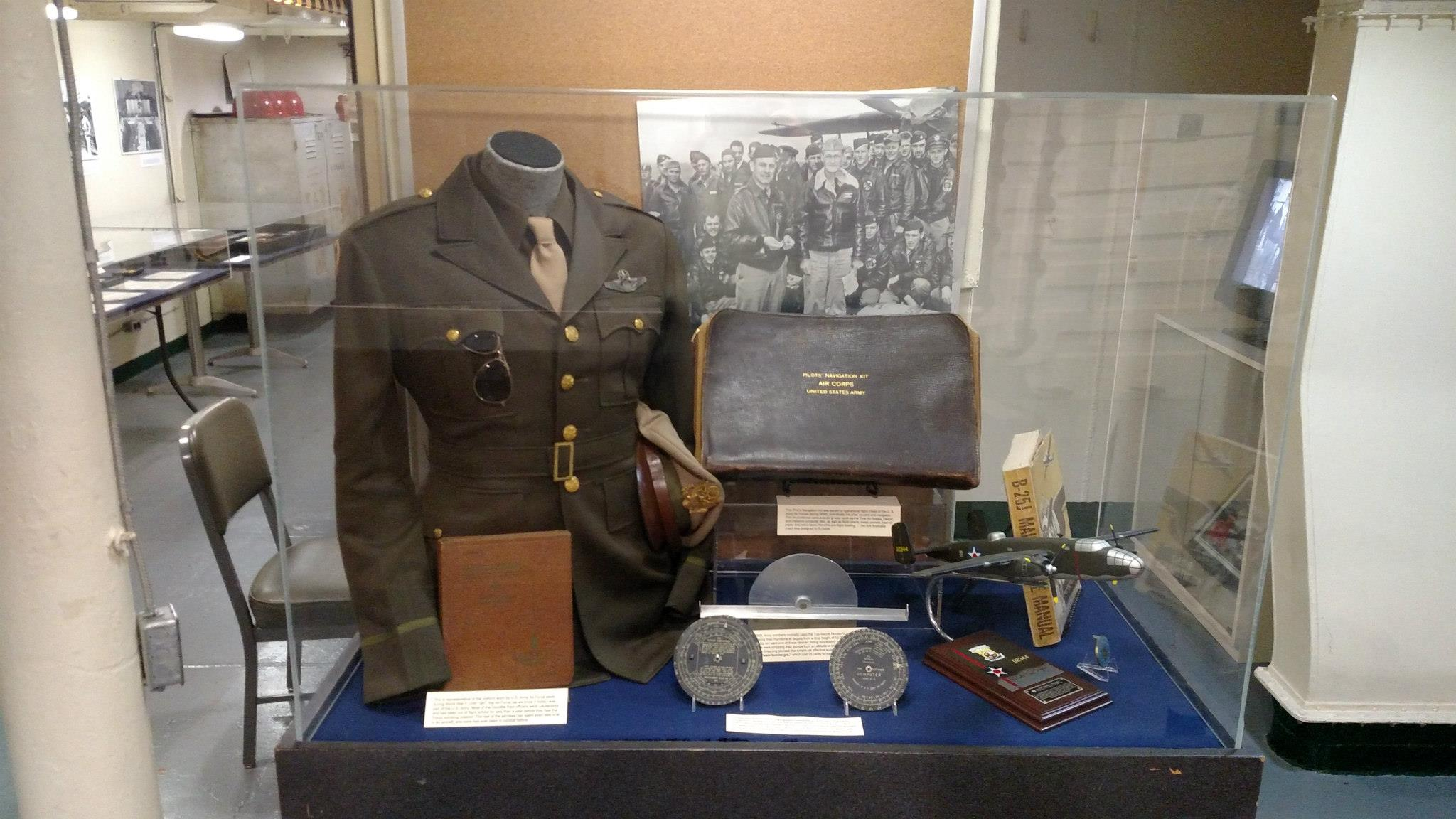
Doolittle Exhibit aboard USS Hornet Museum - August, 2015

A small exhibit about the Doolittle Raid exists (or used to?) at the USS Hornet Museum in Alameda, California.

=== Doolittle Raiders re-enactment ===
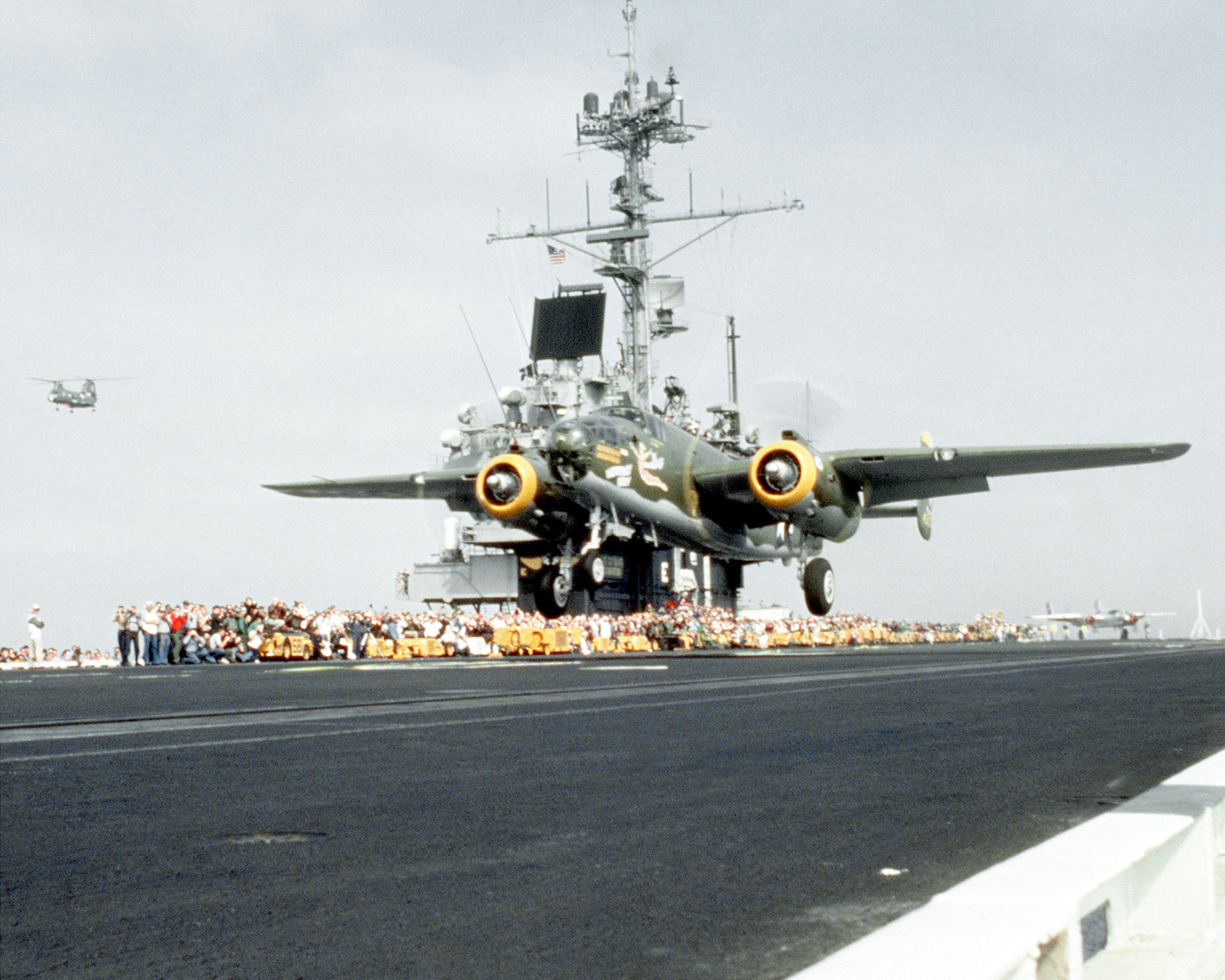
The restored World War II B-25 Heavenly Body taking off from the deck of Ranger

On April 21, 1992, in conjunction with other Department of Defense World War II 50th-Anniversary Commemorative Events, two B-25 Mitchell bombers, B-25J Heavenly Body and B-25J In The Mood, were hoisted aboard USS Ranger. The bombers participated in a commemorative re-enactment of the Doolittle Raid on Tokyo, taking off from Ranger's flight deck before more than 1,500 guests. The launch took place off the coast of San Diego. Four B-25s were approved by the US Navy for the reenactment with two selected. The other two participants were B-25J Executive Sweet and B-25J Pacific Princess. Following the launch, eight B-25s flew up the coast where General Doolittle and his son John P. Doolittle watched as each B-25 came in for a low pass, dropping 250 red, white, and blue carnations into the surf, concluding the event.

=== Congressional Gold Medal ===
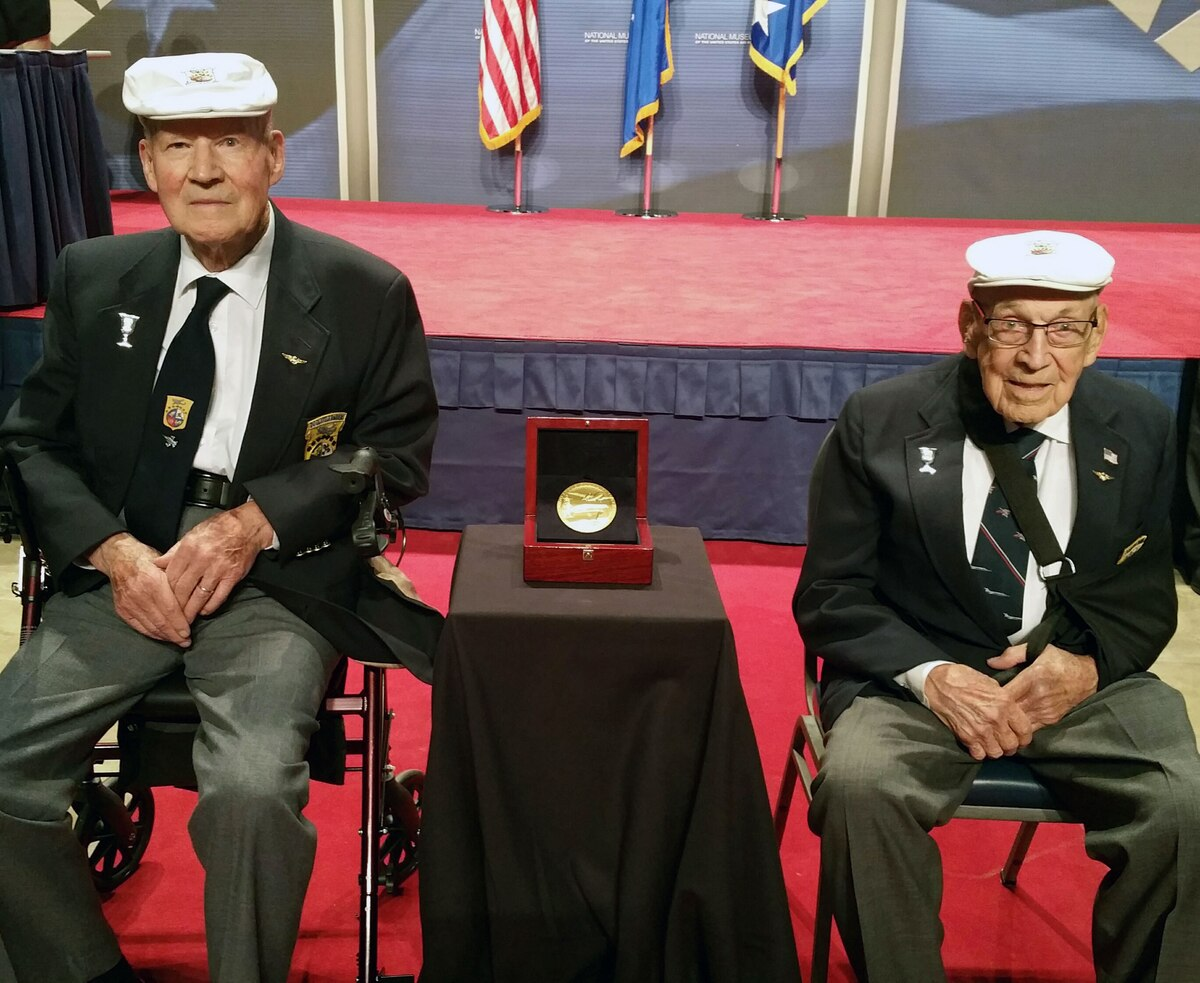
Doolittle Raiders Lt. Col. Richard Cole, co-pilot of Crew No. 1 (right), and Staff Sgt. David Thatcher, engineer-gunner of Crew No. 7, with the Congressional Gold Medal (2015)

On May 19, 2014, the United States House of Representatives passed H.R. 1209, to award the Doolittle Raiders a Congressional Gold Medal for "outstanding heroism, valor, skill, and service to the United States in conducting the bombings of Tokyo." The award ceremony took place at the Capitol Building on April 15, 2015 with retired Air Force Lieutenant General John Hudson, the Director of the National Museum of the Air Force, accepting the award on behalf of the Doolittle Raiders.

=== Northrop Grumman B-21 Raider ===
In September 2016, the Northrop Grumman B-21 was formally named "Raider" in honor of the Doolittle Raiders. The last surviving Doolittle Raider, retired Lt Col Richard E. Cole, was present at the naming ceremony at the Air Force Association conference.
