= Brusett, Montana =

- Unincorporated community
- Location within Montana Location within the United States
- Coordinates: 47°25′31″N 107°16′00″W
- Country: United States
- State: Montana
- County: Garfield
- Elevation: 2,904 ft (885 m)
- Time zone: UTC-7 (Mountain (MST))
  - Summer (DST): UTC-6 (MDT)
- ZIP codes: 59318
- GNIS feature ID: 802064

Brusett is an unincorporated community in northwestern Garfield County, Montana, United States. It lies about the intersection of Brusett Road and Edwards Road, local roads west of the town of Jordan, the county seat of Garfield County. Its elevation is 2,904 feet (885 m). It has a post office, with the ZIP code of 59318.

== History ==
The post office opened on May 29, 1916. The town was named for its first postmaster, Alma Brusett Smith.

== Climate ==
According to the Köppen Climate Classification system, Brusett has a semi-arid climate, abbreviated "BSk" on climate maps.
