= John A. Hilger =

United States Air Force general

John Allen Hilger
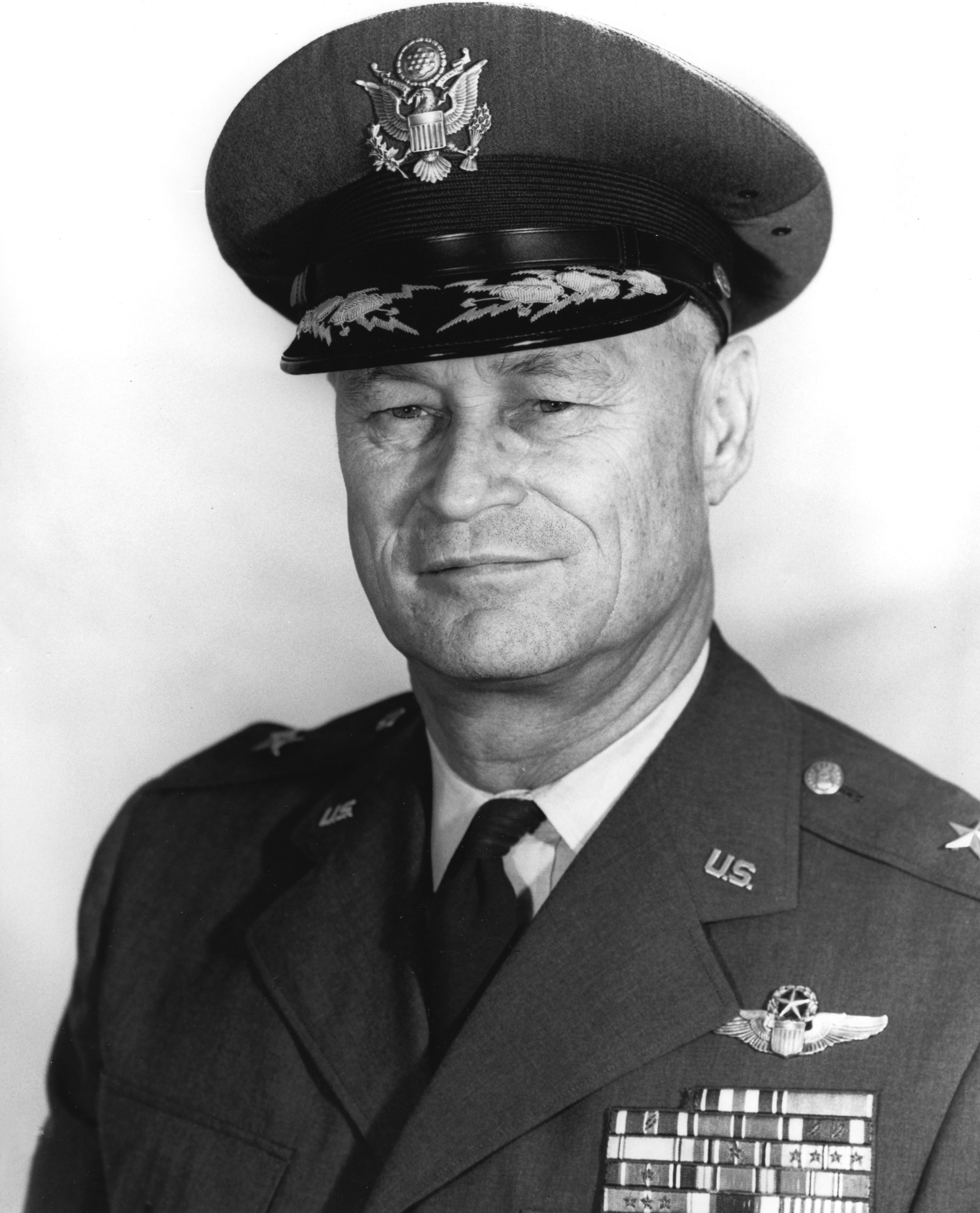
- Born: January 11, 1909; Sherman, Texas, U.S.
- Died: February 3, 1982 (aged 73); San Antonio, Texas, U.S.
- Military career
- Allegiance: United States
- Branch: United States Air Force
- Service years: 1932–1966
- Rank: Brigadier General
- Nickname: Jack
- Commands: Photographic section, March Field; 89th Reconnaissance Squadron; 320th Bomb Group; 344th Bomb Group; Operational Training Unit Bomb Group, Fourteenth Air Force; 1st Bomb Group, CACW; 306th Bomb Group; 307th Bomb Group; 307th Bomb Wing; Air Force Operational Test Center; U.S. Air Force Group, Turkey
- Conflicts: World War II; Korean War
- Awards: Silver Star; Legion of Merit (4); Distinguished Flying Cross (2); Bronze Star Medal; Air Medal (3)

John Allen Hilger (11 January 1909 – 3 February 1982) was a brigadier general in the United States Air Force. Born in Sherman, Texas, Hilger graduated from Agricultural and Mechanical College of Texas and was commissioned in the U.S. Army Air Corps in 1934. He was assigned to the 89th Reconnaissance Squadron as commander in May 1940; flying North American B-25 Mitchell bombers on anti-submarine patrols from December 1941.

Selected by Lieutenant Colonel Jimmy Doolittle for what became known as the Doolittle Raid, he piloted one of the B-25s that bombed Nagoya in Japan on 18 April 1942. He later served as commander of the 307th Bomb Group and flew missions during the Korean War. He served as the Chief of the United States element for the NATO planning group LIVE OAK, before his retirement from the Air Force on 30 November 1966.

== Early life and career ==
On January 11, 1909 John Allen Hilger was born in Sherman, Texas. He was one of four sons born to John Frederick and Emma Viola Hilger. He was a graduate of Sherman High School in 1926 and on the same year, he enrolled at the Agricultural and Mechanical College of Texas. But, he had to halt his studies in 1929 probably due to financial issues. He resumed his education in the autumn of 1931 and simultaneously wed Ina Mae Smith. In 1932, he successfully earned a bachelor of science degree in mechanical engineering. While at Texas A&M, he participated in the university's military program and was affiliated with the American Society of Mechanical Engineers.

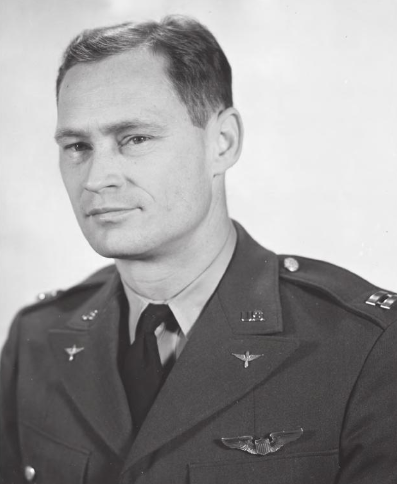
Hilger as captain in the U.S. Army Air Corps (1940)

Hilger embarked on his military career in May 1932 when he became a second lieutenant within the Infantry Reserve of the United States Army. Subsequently, in February 1933, he enrolled in the U.S. Army Air Corps flying school as a flying cadet. After completing his training, he earned his wings and was officially commissioned within the active duty ranks of the Air Corps in February 1934. Following this, his initial post-training assignment was at March Field in California, where he undertook various roles such as serving as an assistant base adjutant, a pilot, and overseeing the photographic section on the base.

By March 1937, Hilger had gone through a divorce and subsequently entered into a new marriage with Virginia Hope Botterud in Los Angeles. Together, they had two children. In October 1939, Hilger was transferred to McChord Field in Washington, and in May 1940, he was appointed as the commander of the 89th Reconnaissance Squadron. He continued to serve at McChord Field, operating North American B-25 Mitchell bombers during anti-submarine patrols until February 1942. During this time, he achieved promotions to the ranks of captain and later to major.

== World War II ==
=== Doolittle Raid ===
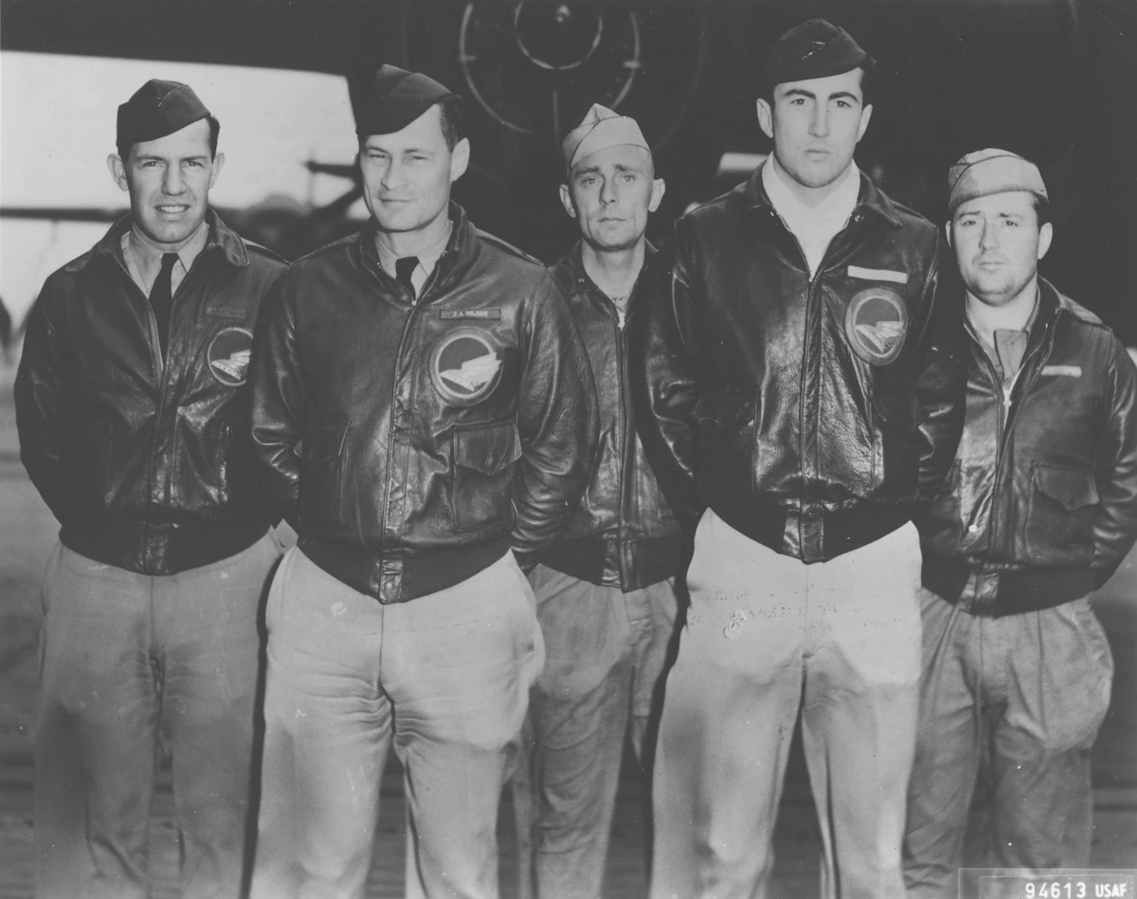
Doolittle Tokyo Raiders, Crew No. 14, 89th Reconnaissance Squadron. John A. Hilger, pilot (second from left). On the deck of USS Hornet, April 18, 1942

In March 1942, Hilger, now a major, was designated as the deputy commander for the Doolittle Raid, the first American air operation to strike the Japanese Home Islands and led by Lt. Col. Jimmy Doolittle. He was selected for this role by Doolittle based on the recommendation of Lt. Col. William C. Mills, the commanding officer of the 17th Bombardment Group, who regarded Hilger as a meticulous and serious individual. He flew as a pilot in the fourteenth B-25 bomber, specifically aircraft No. 40–2344, from the USS Hornet during the mission. Departing earlier than planned due to concerns about Japanese detection, Hilger and his four crew members took off on April 18, 1942. Their target was Nagoya, Japan, where they successfully bombed military barracks near Nagoya Castle and a Mitsubishi Aircraft factory. Subsequently, they aimed for their designated recovery airfield in China. Because of the early launch, their fuel levels were low, preventing them from reaching safety zones in China. As a result, Hilger and his crew had to parachute out over the city of Shangrao in Jiangxi Province, China. Hilger and his crew received assistance from Chinese guerrillas and civilians navigating through Japanese-controlled areas. Within two days, they arrived in Quzhou, Zhejiang Province. On April 30, in Chungking, Hilger, Doolittle, and the other crew members were honored with decorations by Madame Chiang Kai-shek.

After the raid, Hilger returned to the United States. On June 27, General Hap Arnold awarded the Distinguished Flying Cross to Hilger along with twenty-two other airmen at Bolling Field, Washington D.C. The following month, he was honored at Texas A&M, where he gave a speech alongside Ensign George H. Gay Jr., a Texas A&M alumni and sole survivor of Torpedo Squadron 8 during the Battle of Midway.

=== Later war service ===
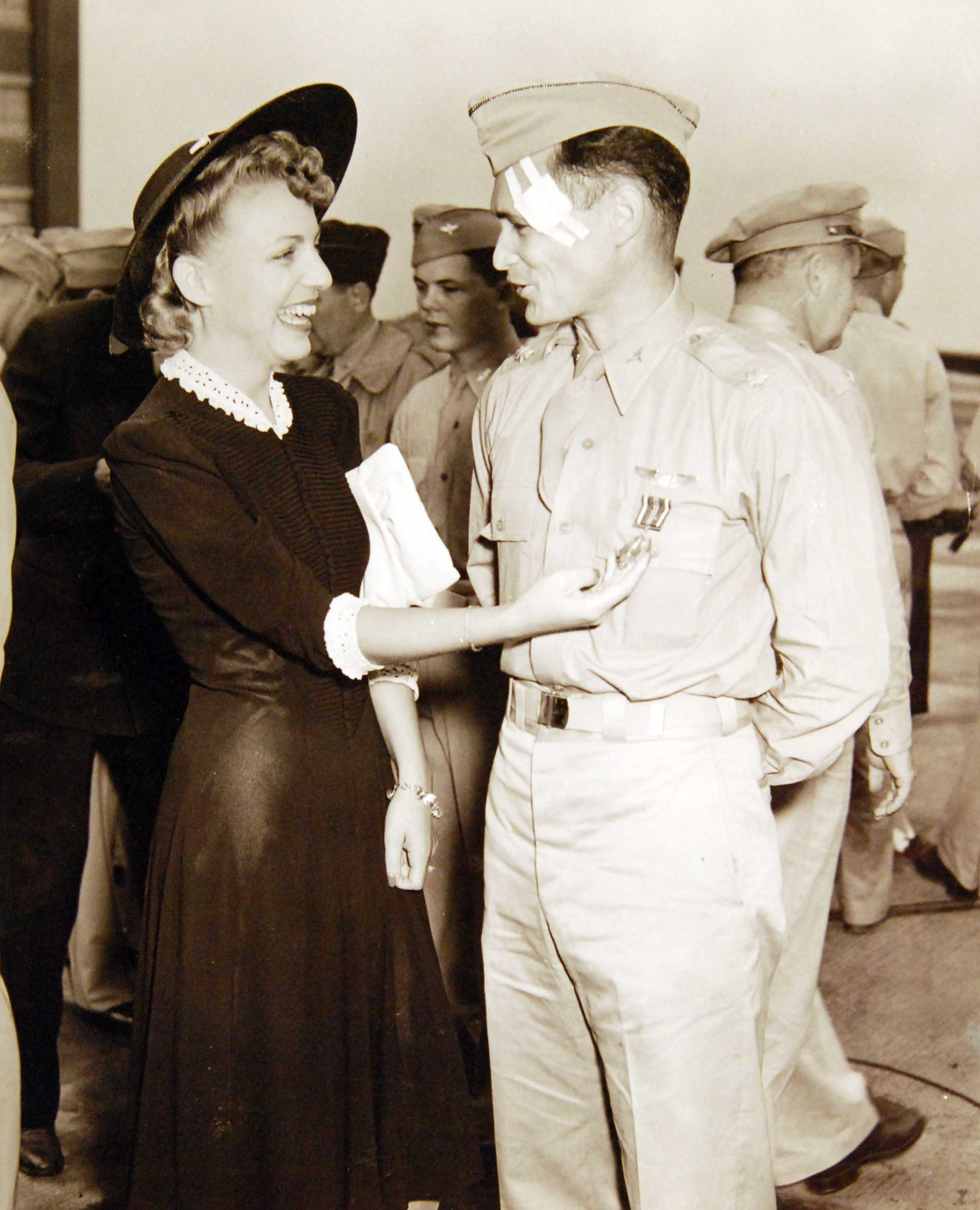
Virginia Hilger admiring her husband's Distinguished Flying Cross following award ceremonies at Bolling Field, Washington, D.C (June 1942)

In September 1942, Hilger was promoted to colonel. From that same month, he commanded the 320th and then the 344th Bomb Groups in Florida, which were equipped with Martin B-26 Marauder bombers, until July 1943.

From July to October 1943, Hilger served in with the 14th Air Force in Kunming, China as the commander of the Operational Training Unit Bomb Group in the China Burma India Theater. He also commanded the 1st Bomb Group of the Chinese-American Composite Wing, but was prohibited from flying combat missions due to fear that he would be executed by the Japanese if captured due to his participation in the Doolittle Raid.

For the last 18 months of World War II, Hilger served in the Western Pacific as a special plans officer on the staff of Admiral Chester Nimitz, who was the commander-in-chief Pacific area.

== Cold War ==
Hilger was assigned to Army Air Force headquarters in January 1946. He worked in the Pentagon where he served as chief of internal policy—a branch of the plans division—until August 1948. He then attended the Air War College and, after graduation, was assigned to the 307th Bomb Wing as commander. The 307th is located at MacDill Air Force Base in Florida. From September 1949 to March 1950, he served as commander of the 306th Bomb Group, which was also at MacDill.

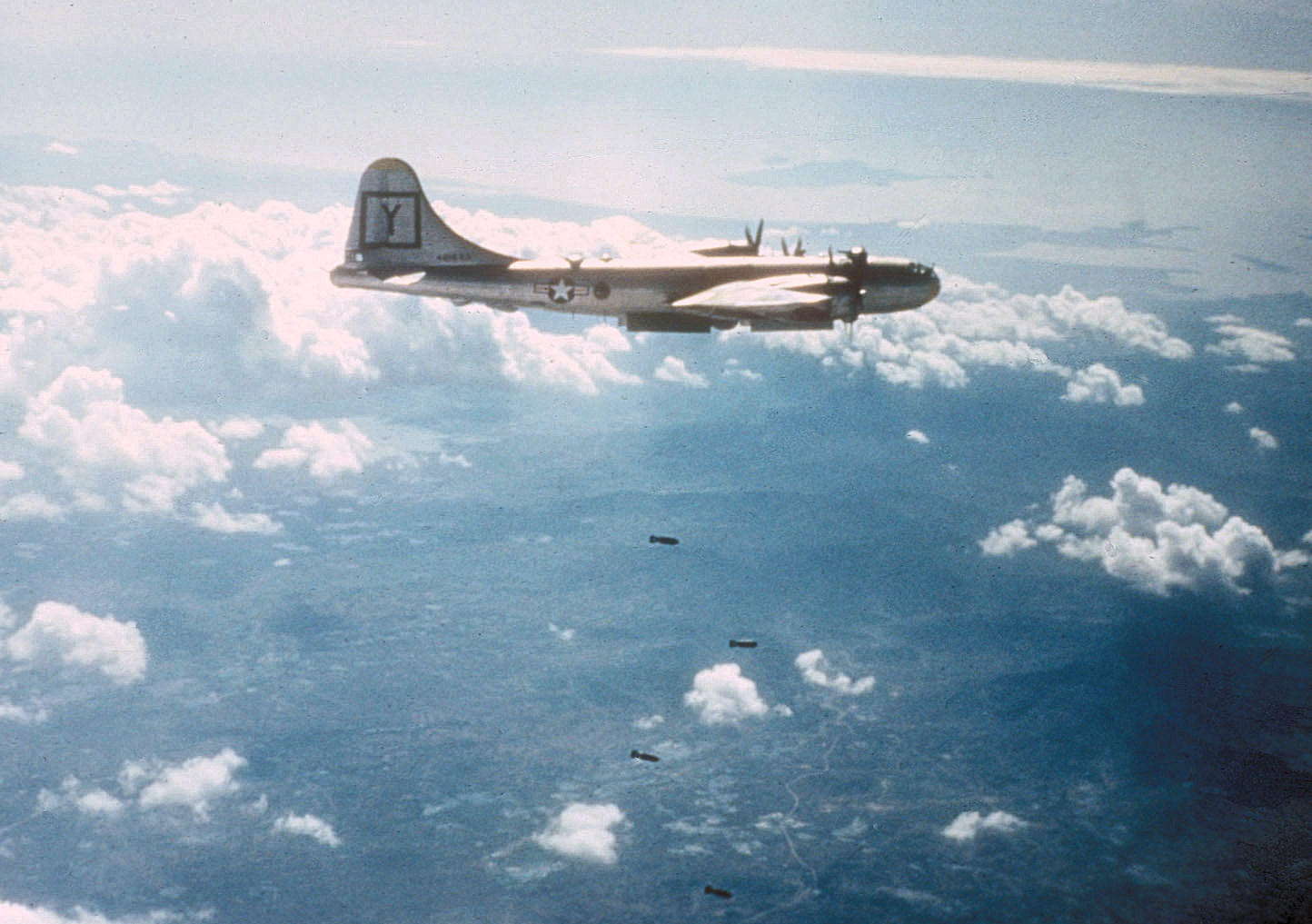
B-29 Superfortress of 307th BG over Korea (1951)

During the Korean War, Hilger assumed command of the 307th Bomb Group, which was stationed at Kadena Air Base in Okinawa, where they flew B-29 Superfortress in combat missions. On November 8, 1950, Hilger led an air raid near Sinuiju, North Korea, which resulted in the destruction of the target despite formidable anti-aircraft fire and fighter plane opposition, and the fact that the city was 666 yards (609 m) on the other side of the Yalu River from the Chinese city of Andong. Additionally, Hilger took on roles within the 307th Bomb Wing staff and later commanded the 307th BW at Kadena AFB from December 1950 to April 1951. Afterward, he served as the director of operations at the headquarters of the 6th Air Division, based at MacDill Air Force Base, until he enrolled in the National War College in Washington, D.C., in August 1951.

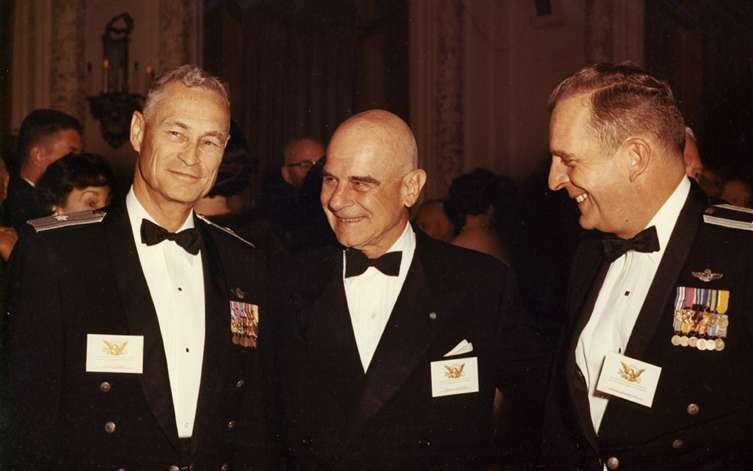
Brigadier General Hilger with Jimmy Doolittle and Colonel Dean Davenport at the 18th reunion of the participants of the Doolittle Raid, in Colorado Springs, Colorado (1960)

In July 1952, Hilger assumed the role of chief in the allocations division within the Directorate of Operations at the Pentagon. He held this position until July 1955 when he was reassigned as the commander of the Air Force Operational Test Center at the Eglin Air Force Base, which was part of the Air Proving Ground Command. In October 1956, he received a promotion to the rank of brigadier general and continued to lead the operational test center until June 1957. Following this, Hilger's next posting sent him to Turkey, where he served as the commander of the U.S. Air Force Group within the Joint U.S. Military Mission for Aid to Turkey, a position he held from June 1957 to June 1959.

From July 1959 to July 1961, he assumed the role of Chief of Staff for Allied Air Forces in Northern Europe, which was part of NATO, based in Oslo, Norway. Subsequently, he served at Randolph Air Force Base in Texas as the Chief of Staff of Air Training Command from August 1961 to July 1964. He then took on the responsibilities of Deputy Chief of Staff for LIVE OAK and also served as the Chief of the United States Element for LIVE OAK starting from July 1964. On November 30, 1966, he retired from the Air Force.

== Later life ==
Following his military retirement, Hilger was employed by the United States Atomic Energy Commission until he fully retired in early 1982. On February 3, 1982, Hilger died at the age of 73. In accordance with his wishes, his remains were cremated and his ashes were scattered in the Pacific Ocean, close to the coast of Newport Beach, California.

On November 9, 2001, Hilger and 12 other Doolittle Raiders who were born in Texas were inducted into the Texas Aviation Hall of Fame at the Lone Star Flight Museum in Galveston.

== Awards and decorations ==
During his lengthy career, Hilger earned many decorations, including:

Command Pilot
Silver Star		Legion of Merit with three bronze oak leaf clusters
Distinguished Flying Cross with bronze oak leaf cluster	Bronze Star Medal	Air Medal with two bronze oak leaf clusters
American Defense Service Medal with service star	American Campaign Medal with service star	European–African–Middle Eastern Campaign Medal with bronze campaign star
Asiatic-Pacific Campaign Medal with four bronze campaign stars	World War II Victory Medal	National Defense Service Medal with service star
Korean Service Medal with three bronze campaign stars	Air Force Longevity Service Award with one silver and two bronze oak leaf clusters	Order of the Cloud and Banner (6th class) (Republic of China)
United Nations Korea Medal	China War Memorial Medal (Republic of China)	Korean War Service Medal (Note: In 2000 this award was made retroactive to all U.S. military personnel who served in the Korean War.)

== Bibliography ==
- Peck Jr., Gaillard R. (2019). Sherman Lead: Flying the F-4D Phantom II in Vietnam (Hardcover). Bloomsbury Publishing. ISBN 9781472829399.
- Woodall, James R. (2015). Twelve Texas Aggie War Heroes: From World War I to Vietnam (Hardcover). Texas A&M University Press. ISBN 9781623493196.
