= Tom Griffin (aviator) =

Participant in the Doolittle Raid

Thomas Carson Griffin
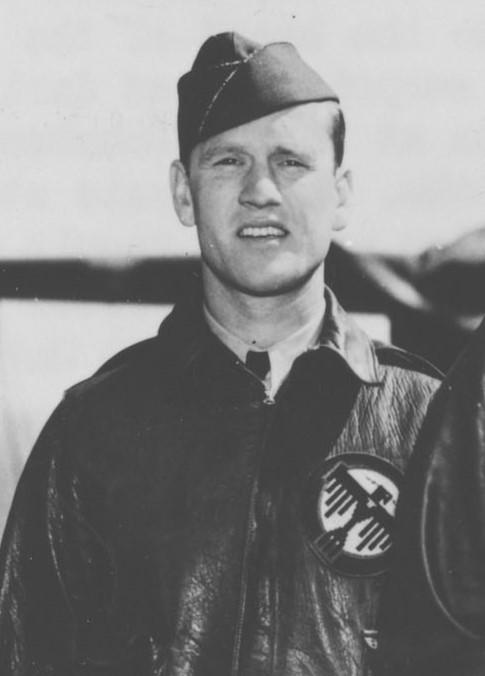
- Born: July 10, 1916; Green Bay, Wisconsin, U.S.
- Died: February 26, 2013 (aged 96); Cincinnati, Ohio, U.S.
- Military career
- Allegiance: United States of America
- Branch: United States Army Air Forces; United States Air Force Reserves
- Service years: 1939–1959
- Rank: Major
- Nickname: Tom
- Units: 34th Bomb Squadron; 438th Bombardment Squadron
- Conflicts: World War II
- Awards: Distinguished Flying Cross; Air Medal (4)

Thomas Carson Griffin (July 10, 1916 – February 26, 2013) was a United States Army Air Forces navigator who served during World War II. He was one of the eighty Doolittle Raiders who bombed Japan in April 1942. After the Doolittle Raid, he was relocated to North Africa and was shot down during an air raid in 1943, spending time in a prisoner-of-war camp until he was rescued in early 1945.

== Early life ==
Griffin was born on 1916 in Green Bay, Wisconsin. In 1939, he graduated from the University of Alabama with a Bachelor of Arts degree in political science.

== Military career ==
On May 15, 1939, through the Army Reserve Officers' Training Corps program at the University of Alabama, Griffin was commissioned a second lieutenant in the Coast Artillery. From July 1939 to July 1940, he served with the 61st Coast Artillery before requesting relief from active duty in 1940 to enlist as a flying cadet in the U.S. Army Air Corps. He was re-commissioned on July 1, 1940, and awarded his Navigator Wings on June 24, 1941. He was then assigned to the 17th Bombardment Group in Pendleton, Oregon, which was equipped with the North American B-25 Mitchell bombers.

=== World War II ===
==== Doolittle Raid ====
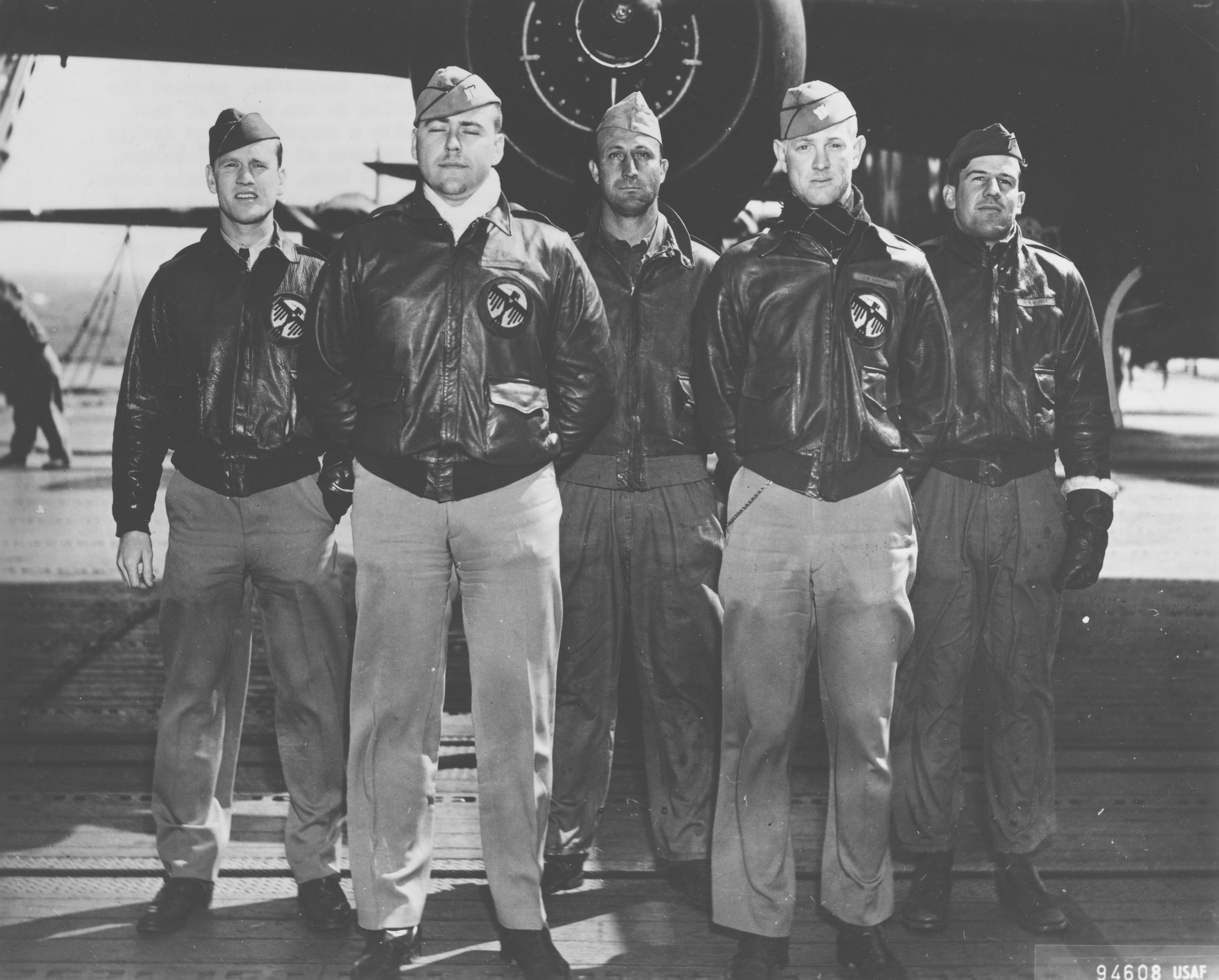
Doolittle Tokyo Raiders, Crew No. 9, 34th Bomb Squadron. From left to right: Lt. Thomas C. Griffin, navigator; Lt. Harold F. Watson, pilot; TSgt. Eldred V. Scott, gunner; Lt. James F. Parker, copilot; SSgt. Wayne M. Bissell, bombardier. On the deck of USS Hornet, April 18, 1942

After the Japanese attack on Pearl Harbor on December 7, 1941, the 17th BG immediately began anti-submarine patrols off the coast of Oregon and Washington.

In February 1942, Griffin volunteered for a "secret mission", even though he did not know what duties were involved or any other details. This mission ended up being the critical Doolittle Raid, which was led by Lieutenant Colonel Jimmy Doolittle. The raid was daring not only because of the intended targets, the Japanese homeland, but because the pilots trained to take-off in a B-25 bomber from the deck of an aircraft carrier, something neither the designers of the B-25, nor the aircraft carrier, ever envisioned.

Griffin was the navigator for ninth bomber, plane# 40-2303 nicknamed "Whirling Dervish", to depart the deck of the USS Hornet during the mission. On April 18, 1942, Griffin and his B-25's four crewmembers, took off from the Hornet and reached Tokyo, Japan. They bombed their target; Tokyo Gas and Electric Company building in the southern part of the city. They then headed for their recovery airfield in China. Running low on fuel due to the early launch of the raid, the B-25s failed to reach any of the designated safety zones in China. Griffin and his crew bailed out behind Japanese lines over the city of Nanchang in Jiangxi Province, China. The pilot of Griffin's bomber, First Lieutenant Harold F. Watson, was badly injured during the bail out and was carried to Hengyang in a porter by friendly Chinese civilians along with the bomber's crew. On April 30, after the crew made their way to Chungking, Griffin, Doolittle and other bomber crew members were decorated by Madame Chiang Kai-shek.

==== Post raid ====
After the raid, from April to August 1942, Griffin remained in China, where flew one additional combat mission with the 34th Bomb Squadron. He was later reassigned as a Martin B-26 Marauder navigator with the 438th Bombardment Squadron of the 319th Bombardment Group. In September 1942, the unit was sent to England and later to North Africa. Griffin flew 19 missions in support of Operation Torch and in preparation for the Allied invasion of Sicily. On July 4, 1943, his aircraft was shot down over Sicily and after bailing out, he was captured and taken prisoner by the Germans. He remained as a prisoner of war until April 1945, when his prison camp was liberated by Allied troops.

== Later life ==
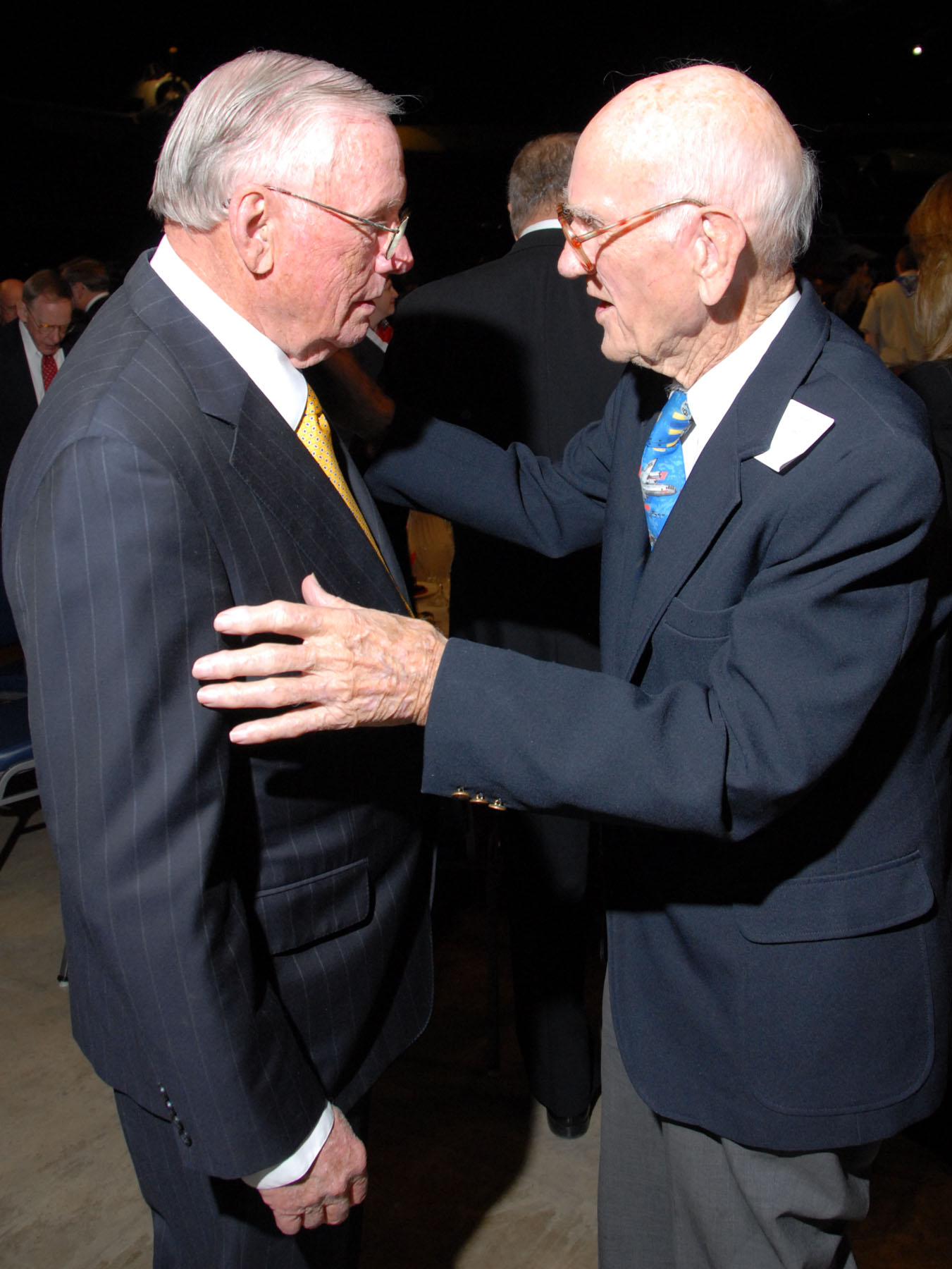
Neil Armstrong (left) and Tom Griffin in 2009

Griffin was married to Esther Brooks (Jones) Griffin, who died in 2005, for 60 years. Thomas and Esther had two sons, and several grand and great-grandchildren.

After the end of World War II, Griffin left active duty on February 22, 1946. He remained in the U.S. Air Force Reserves until April 1959. He moved to Cincinnati where he engaged in accounting business. Griffin joined the Doolittle Raiders Association, and attended every reunion except the final reunion, which was scheduled for April 2013, due to him dying in February 2013.

Griffin died on February 26, 2013, in a Veteran Affairs nursing home in Cincinnati, at the age of 96. He was buried with full military honors at Hillside Chapel Crematory and Columbarium in Cincinnati. His death left just four surviving Doolittle Raiders.

== Awards and decorations ==

U.S. Air Force Navigator/Observer Badge
Distinguished Flying Cross
Air Medal with three bronze oak leaf clusters	Prisoner of War Medal	American Defense Service Medal
American Campaign Medal	Asiatic–Pacific Campaign Medal with bronze campaign star	European–African–Middle Eastern Campaign Medal with two bronze campaign stars
World War II Victory Medal	National Defense Service Medal	Air Force Longevity Service Award
Armed Forces Reserve Medal with bronze hourglass device	Republic of China Medal of the Armed Forces; A-1	Republic of China War Memorial Medal
