= Chinese-American Composite Wing (Provisional) =

Combined China-US air force unit, 1943–1945

- 中美空軍混合團
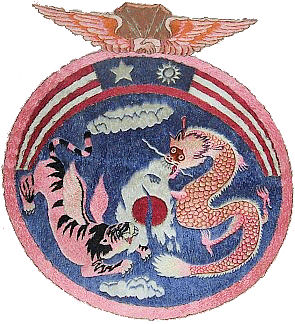
- Wing emblem
- Active: 1943–1945
- Country: China
- Branch: Chinese Nationalist Air Force; United States Army Air Forces
- Part of: Fourteenth Air Force
- Garrison/HQ: Karachi, British India; Guilin, China; Liuzhou, China; Chongqing, China
- Nickname: Flying Tigers
- Engagements: World War II; Pacific Theater; Second Sino-Japanese War; Operation Ichi-Go; Battle of Guilin–Liuzhou
- Decorations: Distinguished Unit Citation

Commanders
- Notable commanders: Brig. Gen. Winslow C. Morse; Col. T. Alan Bennett

The Chinese-American Composite Wing (Provisional) (abbreviated CACW; Chinese: 中美空軍混合團) was a combined Chinese and American fighter and bomber unit that operated during World War II, from 1943 to 1945. The CACW was administratively part of the Fourteenth Air Force, United States Army Air Forces (USAAF), while its individual units were part of the Chinese Nationalist Air Force. The wing and its component groups and squadrons were each led by an American officer who was assisted by a Chinese officer as the deputy commander, and the other personnel were a mix of Chinese and American pilots and ground crew.

The CACW is also sometimes referred to as the "Flying Tigers," the famous nickname of the 1st American Volunteer Group that was disbanded in 1942, though they were separate units. The Fourteenth Air Force that the wing was part of was commanded by Claire Chennault, the founder of the original Flying Tigers.

After being formed in August 1943, the Chinese-American Wing's squadrons were individually trained at an air base in Karachi, India, before flying over the Himalayas to China and carrying out operations against the Japanese. During the Japanese offensives of 1944 and the 1945 campaigns, the CACW provided support to the Chinese National Revolutionary Army by attacking Japanese ground forces and their logistical infrastructure. In the final two years of World War II the CACW flew more missions than the rest of the Chinese Air Force combined.

The CACW was dissolved in September 1945, at which point its two fighter groups and the bomber group were transferred to the ROC Air Force Command. They went on to fight in the Chinese Civil War and later retreated to Taiwan in 1949, becoming part of the Taiwanese ROC Air Force. Today, the 1st, 3rd, and 5th Tactical Fighter Wings of the ROCAF trace their lineage to the CACW.

== Background ==
When the Second Sino-Japanese War broke out in July 1937 with the Marco Polo Bridge incident, the Air Force of the Republic of China (ROC) went into action at the Battle of Shanghai. Much of it was destroyed during the campaign in the Yangtze River valley by the end of 1937, and the Soviet Volunteer Group that arrived in China that year did most of the fighting from that point, alongside what was left of the Chinese Nationalist air force, until it withdrew in 1940. Claire Chennault, a former United States Army Air Corps officer, had been hired by the Chinese Nationalist government in 1937 to help develop their air force, but his efforts were initially unsuccessful, leading him to create the American Volunteer Group in mid-1941. The Flying Tigers, as they were nicknamed, fought the air war against the Japanese with significant success before they were disbanded in July 1942. The achievements of the Flying Tigers led them to be integrated into the United States Army Air Forces (USAAF), becoming the 23rd Fighter Group of the China Air Task Force, commanded by now-Brigadier General Chennault. By this point in the war, Chinese Generalissimo Chiang Kai-shek wanted to prioritize the air campaign over ground operations, and supported Chennault's efforts to attack Japanese targets from his bases in China. Chiang also asked the U.S. to provide aircraft for the Chinese Air Force. President Franklin Roosevelt agreed with their proposals, including to eventually launch attacks on Japan from China, and wanted the commander of the USAAF, General Henry H. Arnold, to send the needed aircraft.

Arnold visited China in February 1943 for a meeting with Chiang and Chennault. The Chinese Air Force still had many experienced pilots and mechanics, but most of its aircraft had been destroyed. Arnold agreed to their request to provide more planes to the Chinese, but only if they operated under American command, because up until that point the Chinese had been reluctant to go on the offensive. Chennault proposed forming fighter and bombardment squadrons that would be led by American officers and include experienced Chinese air crews, which Arnold accepted. Also, as its operations increased, Chennault's China Air Task Force was expanded and renamed the Fourteenth Air Force in March 1943, and the concept of a joint Chinese-American air unit was accepted by President Roosevelt during the Trident Conference that May. Chennault was present at the Conference, where it was decided that the Fourteenth Air Force would be expanded, along with the ROC Air Force. When the first steps were being taken to form the Chinese-American wing in the late spring of 1943, USAAF Brigadier General Howard Davidson was in charge of the project, which was code-named "Lotus."

The United States and the Republic of China agreed to create a composite wing of two fighter groups and one bombardment group, which would remain under American command until the Chinese became capable of operating and maintaining their new American equipment without assistance, at which point control of the wing would be given over to the Chinese Nationalist air force. American officers and enlisted would work together with the Chinese crews during training, and once the Wing became operational, the American officers would be group and squadron leaders while the enlisted airmen would oversee the ground support crews. Chinese officers served as deputy commanders in each unit. The Chinese-American Composite Wing (CACW) headquarters would be part of the U.S. Fourteenth Air Force, though its groups and squadrons were part of the ROCAF.

== Formation and training ==
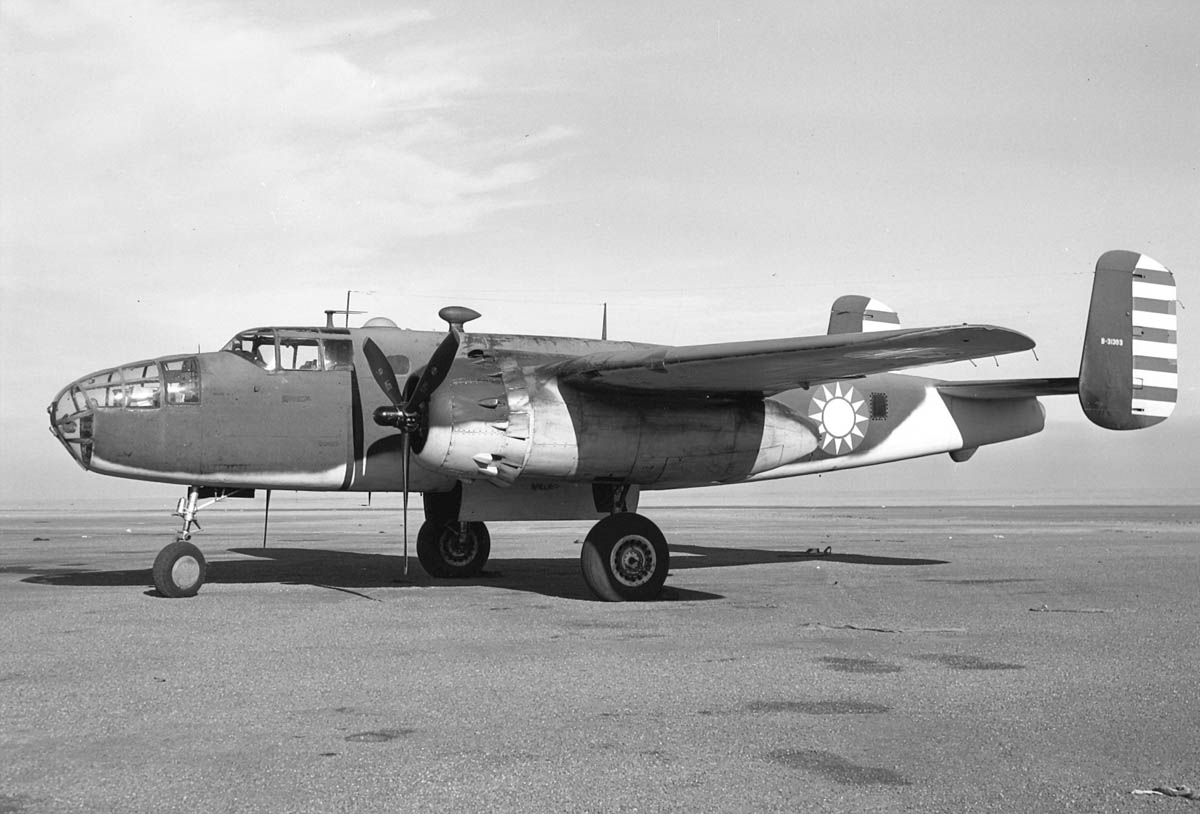
A B-25 with Chinese Nationalist insignia, similar to the ones flown by the CACW.

By June 1943 the Operational Training Unit (Provisional) was established at Malir Field, a British and American air base in Karachi, British India. In July the headquarters of the Chinese-American Composite Wing began forming. Its first formations, activated on 1 August 1943, were the 1st Bombardment Group (Provisional) and the 3rd Fighter Group (Provisional), ROC Air Force. They had four squadrons each. The American personnel for these units came from the U.S. 402nd Bombardment Group and the 476th Fighter Group, respectively, and prominent among them were Colonel John A. Hilger, who had been part of the Doolittle Raid on Japan in 1942, to command the 1st Bomber Group, and Lt. Colonel T. Alan Bennett to lead the 3rd Fighter Group. The Chinese members included veterans that had been fighting from the start of the war to more recent recruits that just returned from pilot training in the United States. The deputy commanders were Major Yuan Chin-Han for the 3rd Fighter Group and Major Li Hseuh-Yeh was the 1st Bombardment Group.

The CACW training began on 5 August 1943, with the Curtiss P-40 Warhawk for the fighter group and the B-25 Mitchell for the bombardment group. The training was carried out with one fighter and one bombardment squadron at a time for six weeks, until all four squadrons of both groups had gone through the program. There was also an effort by the American members to study the Chinese language, though they had to continue to speak through interpreters. The Americans made an effort to develop good relations with the Chinese in the unit despite the language barrier and cultural differences.

The Chinese-American Composite Wing was officially activated on 1 October 1943 with USAAF Colonel Winslow C. Morse as the wing commander, though it was not until April 1944 that Lieutenant Colonel Chiang Y. F. arrived to become the wing's Chinese vice commander. Its first squadrons left India for China at the end of October 1943. The 1st Bombardment Group set up its headquarters at Yangkai Airfield while the 3rd Fighter Group was at the Chanyi Airfield before moving a month later to an airfield near Guilin. Squadrons continued to be trained over the next several months, with the last finishing in May 1944. The CACW headquarters itself was moved to Guilin in January 1944.

Because all of the Chinese-American Wing's units were part of the Chinese Nationalist air force, the Chinese government was initially responsible for providing supplies, housing, and other logistical services for their members. The Chinese supply system was inadequate, and the wing had shortages of basic equipment until early 1945, when the USAAF took over their logistics.

== Operational history ==
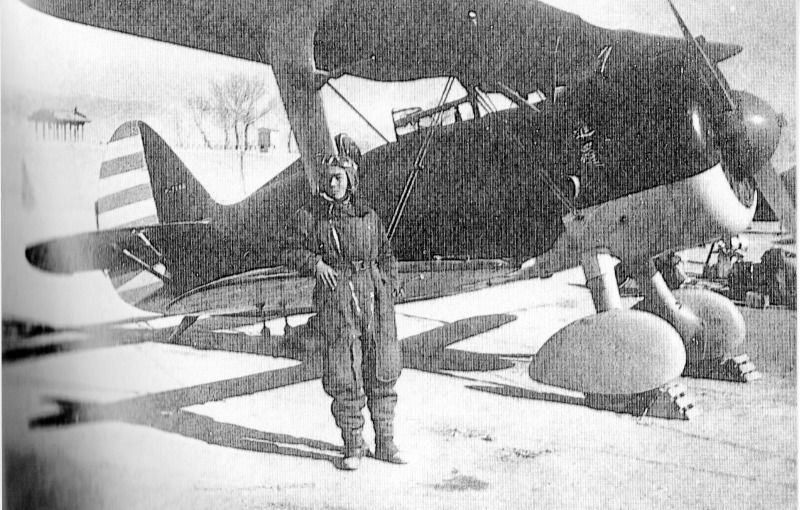
Xu Jixiang leaning on an I-15bis, a fighter he was forced to crash land after being shot by a Japanese A6M Zero during the Battle of Chongqing in 1940. In 1944 he shot down a Zero at Qiongshan, Hainan, while flying a P-40 with the CACW.

The first three squadrons to arrive in China (the 28th and 32nd Fighter Squadrons and the 2nd Bombardment Squadron) spent the fall of 1943 in operations against Japanese shipping and airfields along the country's southern coast. The B-25s of the bombardment squadron started right away, while the fighters did not have their first mission until 1 December 1943. On 1 January 1944, the squadrons were inspected by Chiang Kai-shek at Guilin. In the middle of the month, they were joined by the 7th and 8th Fighter Squadrons and the 1st Bombardment Squadron, which meant the entire 3rd Fighter Group was now deployed. The 5th Fighter Group was formed on 13 January 1944 and began training.

On 1 March 1944 the first mission took place that only involved Chinese air crews, when the 1st Bombardment Group raided the Japanese at Nanchang, with the 3rd Fighter Group protecting them, though they were not attacked by Japanese aircraft. The CACW spent its early combat history in late 1943 and early 1944 raiding Japanese bases and shipping along the Chinese coast, before targeting the Japanese in the area along the Yellow River. Code-named "Mission A," it was an air campaign by the Chinese-American Wing to disrupt a Japanese offensive from north China to capture the entirety of the Beijing–Hankou railway. Control of the railway would improve Japanese logistics in preparation to launch what would become Operation Ichi-Go, one of Japan's largest offensives, and at the same time eliminate some of the air bases used by the Fourteenth Air Force. The CACW was tasked with destroying parts of the railway infrastructure and bridges, assisting the Chinese army, intercepting Japanese air attacks, and slowing down the Japanese ground troops. But the Japanese advance was faster than anticipated and they crossed the bridge over the Yellow River near Zhengzhou on 19 April 1944. After this, the 3rd Fighter Group and the 2nd Bombardment Squadron spent the time from May to June 1944 waging attacks against Japanese ground forces and other targets near the Yellow River. Despite this, the Japanese were still able to accomplish their objectives. But the Chinese-American Wing inflicted significant damage, and the 3rd Fighter Group and 2nd Bombardment Squadron received a Distinguished Unit Citation.

While the 3rd Group and the 2nd Squadron were in the north, further to the south the 5th Fighter Group (the first squadrons of which had arrived recently from India) and the rest of the 1st Bomber Group were also involved in fighting the Japanese. A task force of B-25s from the CACW 1st Group carried out operations along the East China coast, starting from late April. On 6 May 1944, the force's 11th Bomber Squadron, along with the U.S. 23rd Fighter Group, struck Japanese airfields at Hankou. Once the main phase of Operation Ichi-Go started in southern China, the 5th Fighter Group was used to strafe the advancing Japanese troops, as well as continuing to escort bombers and intercept Japanese air attacks.

In June 1944, all component units of the CACW, in the north and in the south, were moving from one base to another as the situation on the frequently changed, and the overall headquarters was also transferred. In May, the wing headquarters were moved to Liuzhou, before being moved the next month to Peishiyi Airfield in Chongqing. Also around this time, the remaining squadrons of the 5th Fighter Group that had been training in India were sent to join the rest of the CACW in China. In mid-June, the 5th Group and the 1st Group assisted the defending Chinese army in the Battle of Changsha with attacks on the Japanese, and in July they destroyed or probably destroyed 97 Japanese planes and damaged 31 at an air field near Yueyang. In north China, the 3rd Fighter Group continued its mission of disrupting Japanese logistics.

The 3rd Bombardment Squadron, the last unit of the CACW to complete its training, did not arrive in China right away and spent the summer of 1944 supporting the Chinese Y Force during the Burma campaign. By late June, a Chinese offensive near the Salween River had been stopped and was being pushed back by the Japanese, and the 3rd Squadron flew its first mission on 25 June 1944. In July and August, they supported the forces besieging Myitkyina, before joining the rest of the CACW in China.

== Dissolution ==
The former CACW formed the core of the Chinese Nationalist Air Force. The fighter and bombardment groups of the former CACW later practically became the basis of the Republic of China Air Force formed after the World War II.

In Taiwan, The current 1st (443rd), 3rd (427th), and 5th (401st), Tactical Fighter Wings of the Republic of China Air Force trace their unit lineage to the Chinese-American Composite Wing.

== Personnel ==
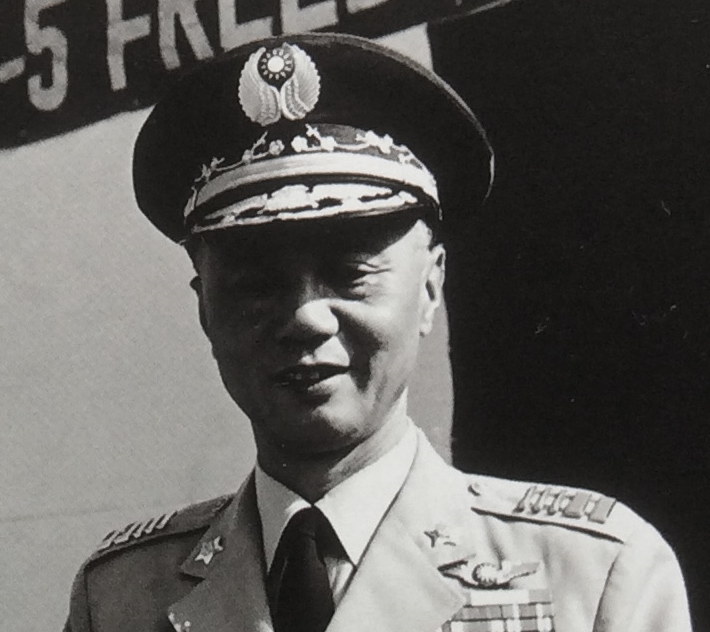
Xu Huansheng, the former CACW vice commander as the ROCAF Commander-in-Chief in the 1960s.

The majority of the members of the two fighter groups were Chinese, while in the bombardment group it was split equally between Americans and Chinese.

Lieutenant Wang Kuang-Fu became the only Chinese ace pilot in the CACW.

=== Commanding officers ===
The commanders of the Wing, its groups, and its squadrons were all American while the deputy commanders were Chinese. The Chinese officers at each headquarters were also responsible for the pay and supply of the Chinese enlisted personnel. This system was in place from the start of the initial training in 1943, but finding Chinese officers to assist with administrative work at the CACW headquarters took until the spring of 1944, because of the lack of English-speaking Chinese officers.

Commanders:

- Colonel (later Brigadier General) Winslow C. Morse (October 1943 – March 1945)
- Colonel T. Alan Bennett (March – September 1945)

Deputy commanders:

- Lieutenant Colonel Chiang Yifu (March or April 1944 – January 1945)
- Xu Huansheng (January – September 1945)

== Organization ==
The Chinese-American Composite Wing had two fighter groups and one bombardment group of four squadrons each, which were numbered in accordance with the Republic of China Air Force organization system. The structure of the Wing was as follows:

Formed on 1 August 1943.

- 1st Bombardment Gp (Provisional)

1st Bombardment Sq (Provisional)
2nd Bombardment Sq (Provisional)
3d Bombardment Sq (Provisional)
4th Bombardment Sq (Provisional)

- 3d Fighter Gp (Provisional)

7th Fighter Sq (Provisional)
8th Fighter Sq (Provisional)
28th Fighter Sq (Provisional)
32nd Fighter Sq (Provisional)

Formed on 13 January 1944.

- 5th Fighter Gp (Provisional)

17th Fighter Sq (Provisional)
26th Fighter Sq (Provisional)
27th Fighter Sq (Provisional)
29th Fighter Sq (Provisional)

== Aircraft ==
The CACW air crews changed the U.S. star on the sides of their aircraft with the Chinese Nationalist Blue Sky and White Sun roundel.

- P-40 Warhawk (1943–1945)
- P-47 Thunderbolt
- P-51 Mustang (1944–1945)
- B-25 Mitchell (1943–1945)
