= Chen Jiashang =

Chen Jiashang may refer to:

- Gordon Chan (born 1960), Hong Kong film director
- Chen Jia-shang (1909–1972), the third Commander-in-Chief of the Republic of China Air Force
