= Commander of the Air Force (Taiwan) =

Commander of the Republic of China Air Force
- Republic of China Air Force badge

- Flag for the Commander of the Air Force

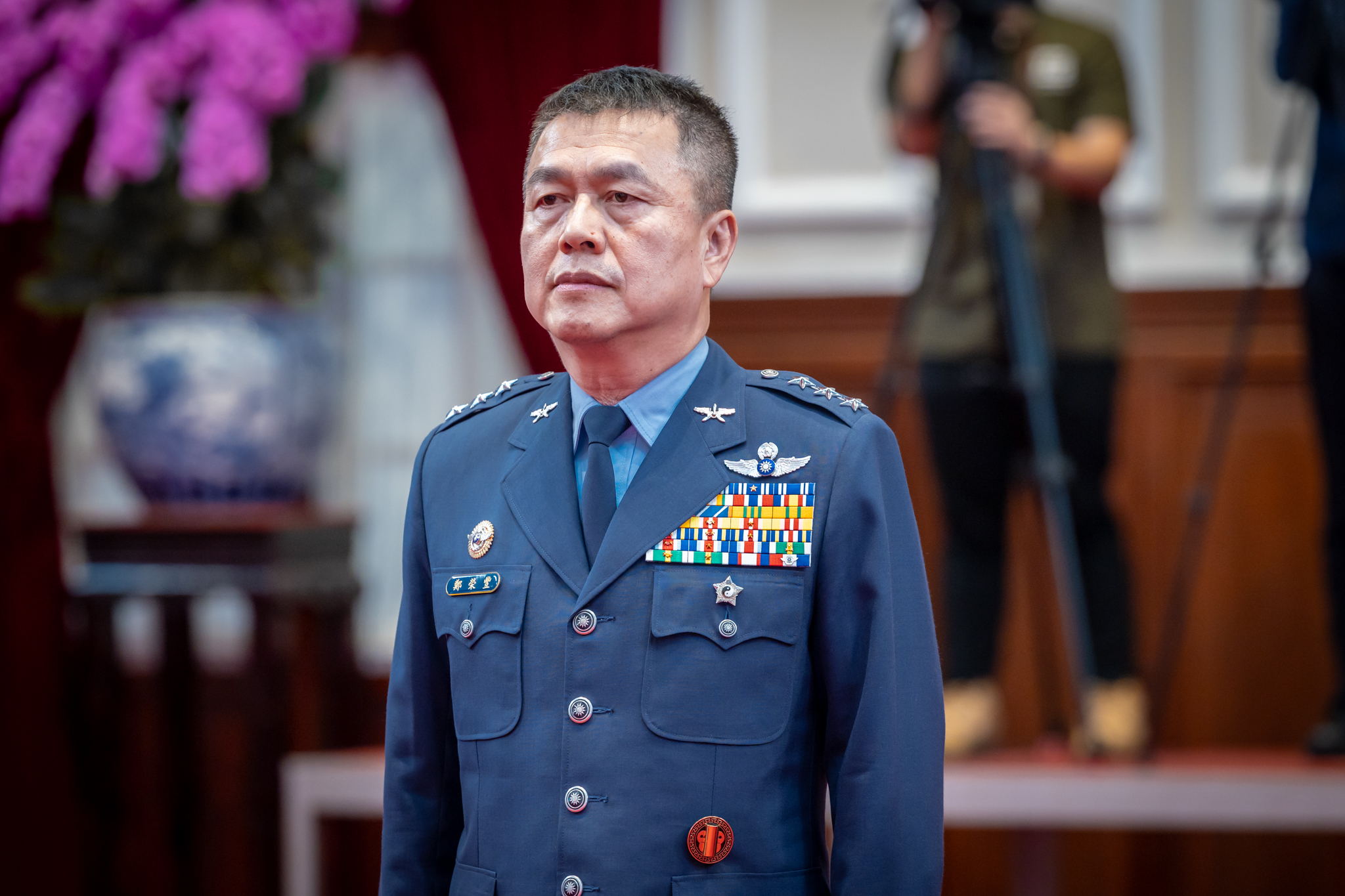
- Incumbent; General Cheng Jung-feng since 14 November 2024
- Republic of China Air Force
- Reports to: Chief of the General Staff
- Formation: June 1946
- First holder: Zhou Zhi-rou

The Commander of the Air Force (Chinese: 中華民國空軍司令) is the professional head of the Republic of China Air Force (ROCAF).

== List ==
The following is the list of commanders of the Air Force.

=== Commander-in-Chief ===
Order	Portrait	Name	Rank	In office	Notes
1		Zhou Zhi-rou	Full general	June 1946 – March 1952	
2		Wang Shuming	General	March 1952 – July 1957	
3		Chen Jia-shang	General	July 1957－July 1963	
4		Xu Huansheng	General	July 1963 － July 1967	
5		Lai Ming-tang	General	July 1967 － July 1970	
6		Chen Yi-fan	General	July 1970 － June 1975	
7		Situ Fu	General	June 1975 － August 1977	
8		Wu Yue	General	August 1977 － January 1982	
9		Kuo Ju-lin	General	January 1982 － July 1986	
10		Chen Hsing-ling	General	July 1986 － November 1989	
11		Lin Wen-li	General	November 1989－ September 1992	
12		Tang Fei	General	September 1992 － 30 June 1995	
13		Huang Hsien-jung	General	1 July 1995 － 11 June 1998	
14		Chen Chao-min	General	12 June 1998 － 28 February 2002	
15		Lee Tien-yu	General	1 March 2002 － 18 May 2004	
16		Liu Kui-li	General	20 May 2004 － 16 February 2006	

=== Commander ===
Order	Portrait	Name	Rank	In office	Notes
1		Shen Gou-zhen	General	17 February 2002 － 15 July 2007	
2		Peng Sheng-chu	General	16 July 2007 － 15 July 2009	
3		Lei Yu-chi	General	16 July 2009 － 5 January 2011	
4		Yen Ming	General	6 January 2011 － 15 January 2013	
5		Kiu Chen-wu	General	16 January 2013 － 30 January 2015	
6		Shen Yi-ming	General	31 January 2015 － 28 February 2018	
7		Chang Che-ping	General	1 March 2018 － 30 June 2019	
8		Hsiung Hou-chi	General	1 July 2019 － 30 April 2022	
9		Liu Jen-yuan	General	1 May 2022 － 14 November 2024	
10		Cheng Jung-feng	General	14 November 2024 － present	
