= 89th Attack Squadron =

89th Attack Squadron

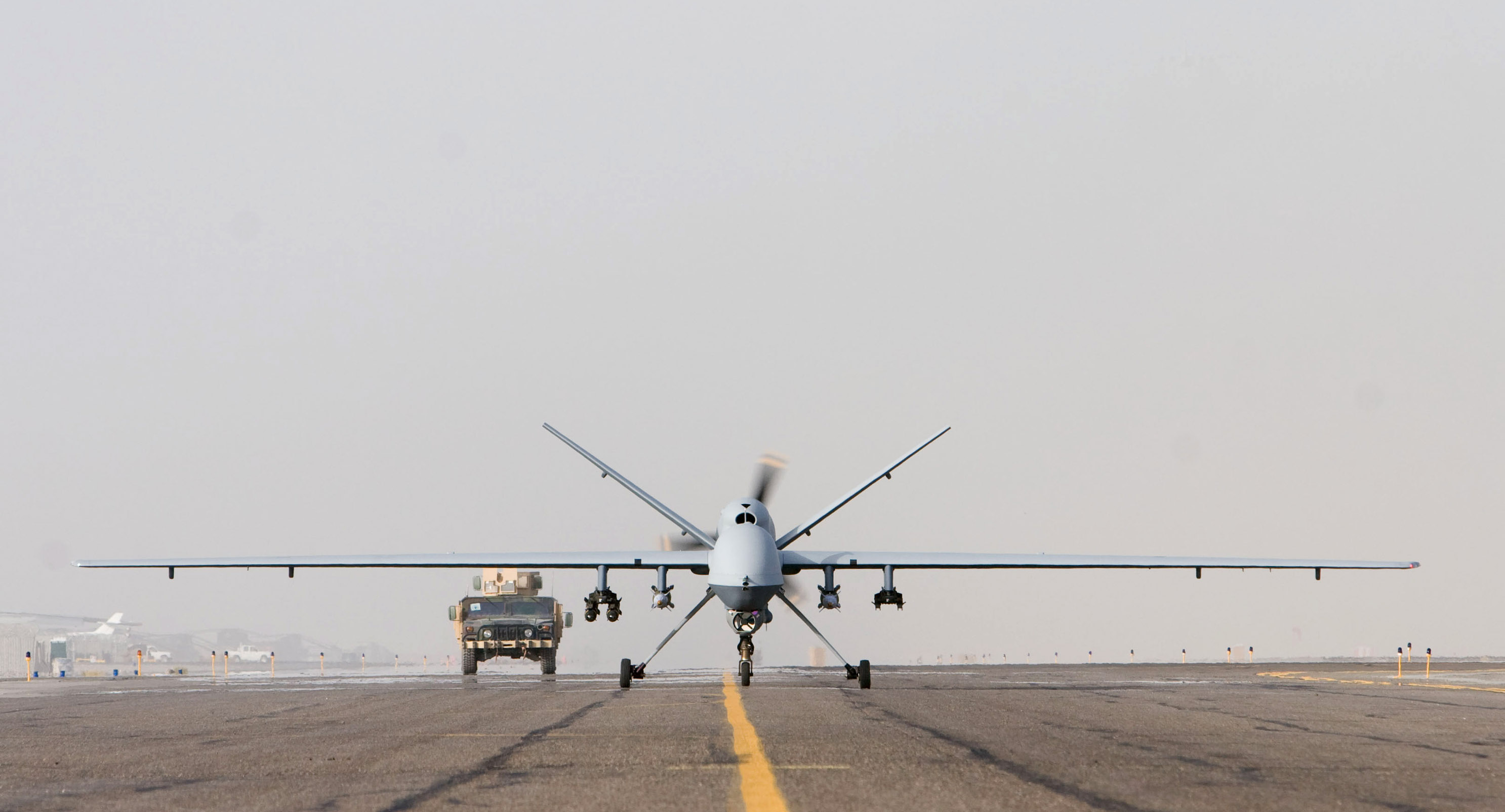
- An MQ-9 Reaper taxis before a mission in Afghanistan
- Active: 1917–1919; 1940–1945; 2011–present
- Country: United States
- Branch: United States Air Force
- Role: Attack
- Size: 280 military and civilians
- Part of: Air Combat Command
- Garrison/HQ: Ellsworth Air Force Base, South Dakota
- Nickname: Marauders
- Engagements: European Theater of World War II; Mediterranean Theater of Operations
- Decorations: Distinguished Unit Citation; French Croix de Guerre with Palm

Commanders
- Notable commanders: Joseph T. McNarney; John A. Hilger

Insignia
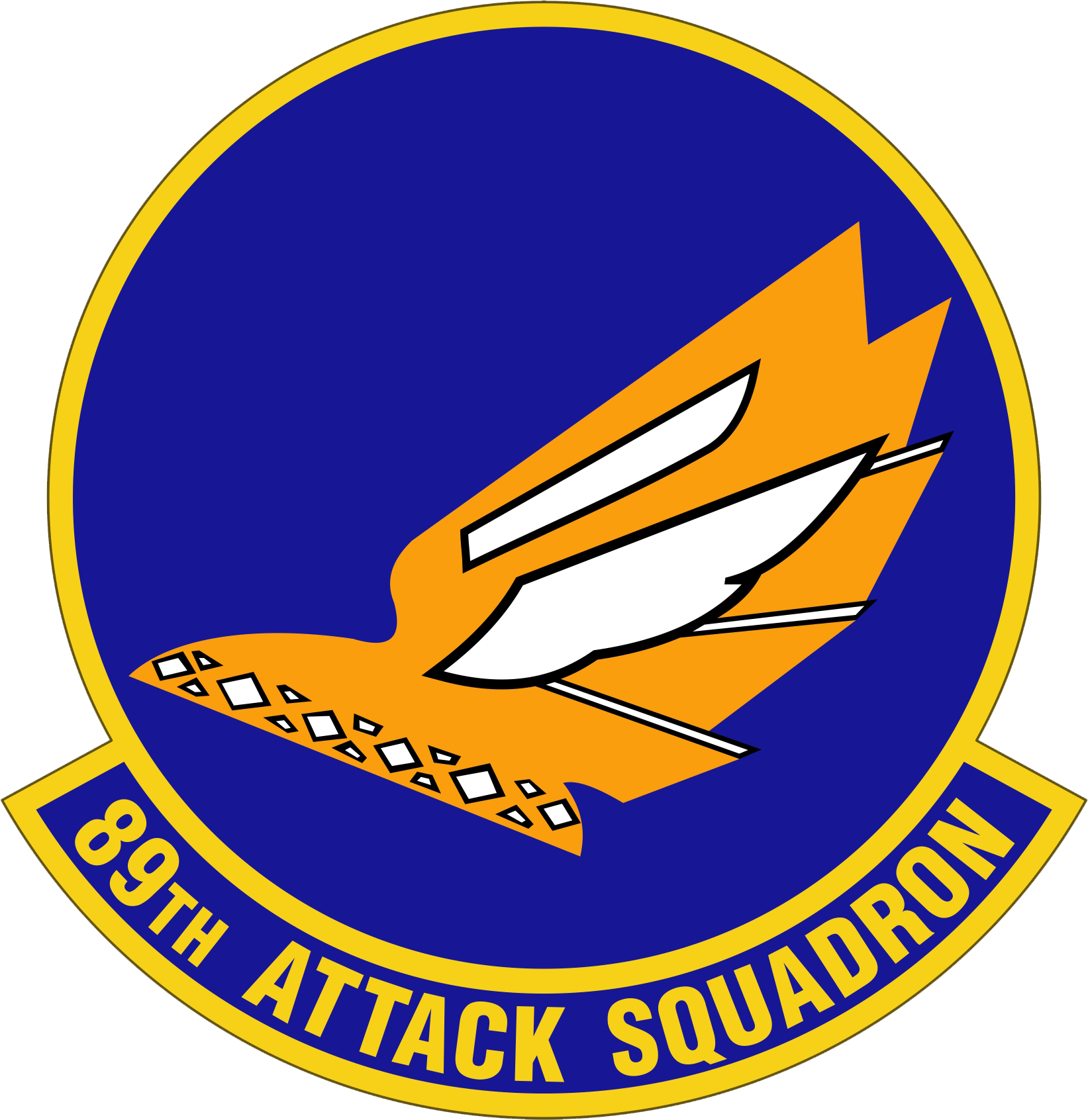
- 89th Attack Squadron emblem

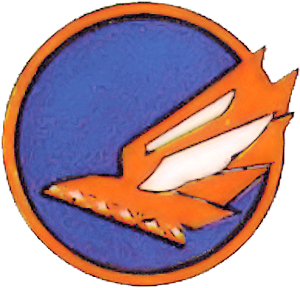
- 89th Reconnaissance Squadron emblem (Note: Approved 30 January 1941. Description: On a blue disc with golden orange border Mercury's helmet with exaggerated wings of golden orange and with decorative hat band and feathers of white.)

The 89th Attack Squadron is a United States Air Force unit assigned to the 432d Wing as a tenant unit at Ellsworth Air Force Base, South Dakota. It has been active as a remotely piloted aircraft (drone) squadron there since 2011.

The squadron was first activated as the 89th Aero Squadron at Kelly Field, Texas during World War I. It deployed to France in 1917, where it constructed fields and trained observers, In 1918 it briefly trained as an observation unit, but the unit did not move to the front before the Armistice.

It was consolidated in the mid-1930s with the 89th Observation Squadron as the 89th Reconnaissance Squadron but remained inactive until 1940, when it was attached to the 17th Bombardment Group at March Field, California and equipped with medium bombers. In 1942 members of the squadron participated in the Doolittle Raid against Tokyo. The squadron, now named the 432d Bombardment Squadron, moved to the Mediterranean Theater of Operations and participated in combat until 1945, earning two Distinguished Unit Citations and the French Croix de Guerre with Palm before returning to the United States in late 1945 and being inactivated.

The 432d was reactivated as the 432d Attack Squadron in October 2011 at Ellsworth Air Force Base, South Dakota as a MQ-9 Reaper remotely piloted aircraft squadron.

== Mission ==
The 89th Attack Squadron mission is to remotely employ General Atomics MQ-9 Reaper aircraft from ground control facilities located at Ellsworth Air Force Base to support combatant commander requirements around the world. The squadron, which operates the aircraft, and the Reaper ground control station are based at Ellsworth. Its aircraft are deployed overseas, supporting continuing operations.

== History ==
=== World War I ===
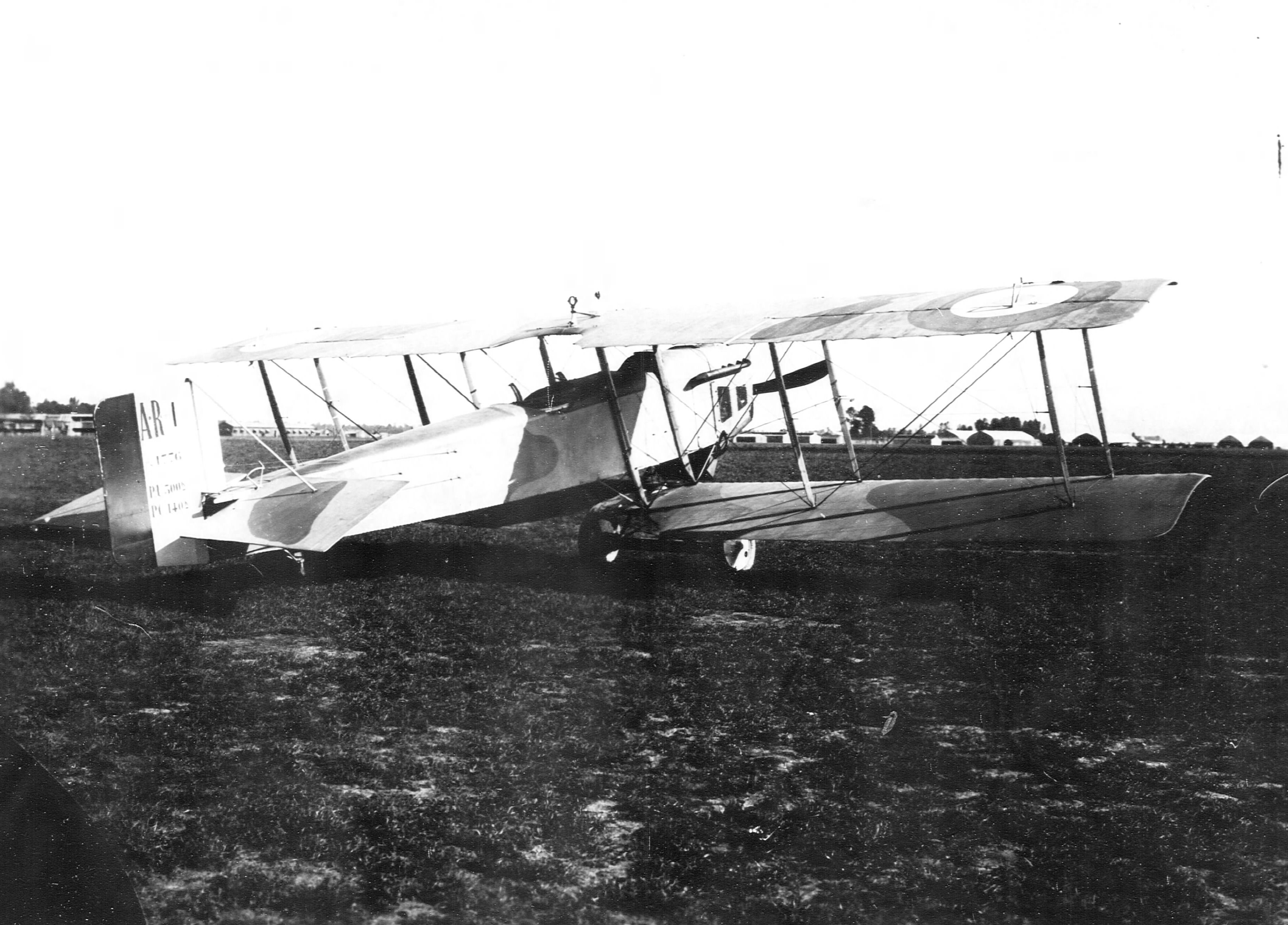
Dorand AR.1 with the Air Service in France

The first predecessor of the squadron was activated at Kelly Field, Texas as the 89th Aero Squadron on 19 August 1917. The men who formed the squadron had been inducted into the Army ten days earlier at Fort Logan, Colorado. After processing, they departed for Kelly and upon arrival, formed the 89th and 88th Aero Squadrons and were trained on assembling new aircraft. The squadron moved to the Aviation Concentration Center at Camp Mills, Garden City, New York in October to prepare for overseas movement.

The 89th arrived at the 1st Air Depot, American Expeditionary Force at Colombey-les-Belles Airdrome, France on 16 November where it began work on constructing facilities for the depot. In February 1918, the squadron moved to Châtillon-sur-Seine, where it began work on construction of a flying field for the 2d Corps Aeronautical School. However, the squadron was quartered on a large farm some distance from the flying field, so construction of the field and supporting facilities took a month to complete and training of observers did not begin until May.

The squadron was assigned the first pilots to arrive at Chatillon and began training observers in artillery adjustment, photography, and gunnery. A photographic detachment of squadron enlisted men developed the pictures taken by the students at the school. These men formed the cadre for the 101st Photographic Section later in the year.

The 89th prepared for combat as an observation unit in July 1918, but never went to front, and in September all pilots assigned to the school were transferred to the headquarters of the Aeronautical School. The squadron returned to the United States where it was demobilized in 1919.

In 1936 the 89th was consolidated on the inactive list with the 89th Observation Squadron.

=== World War II ===
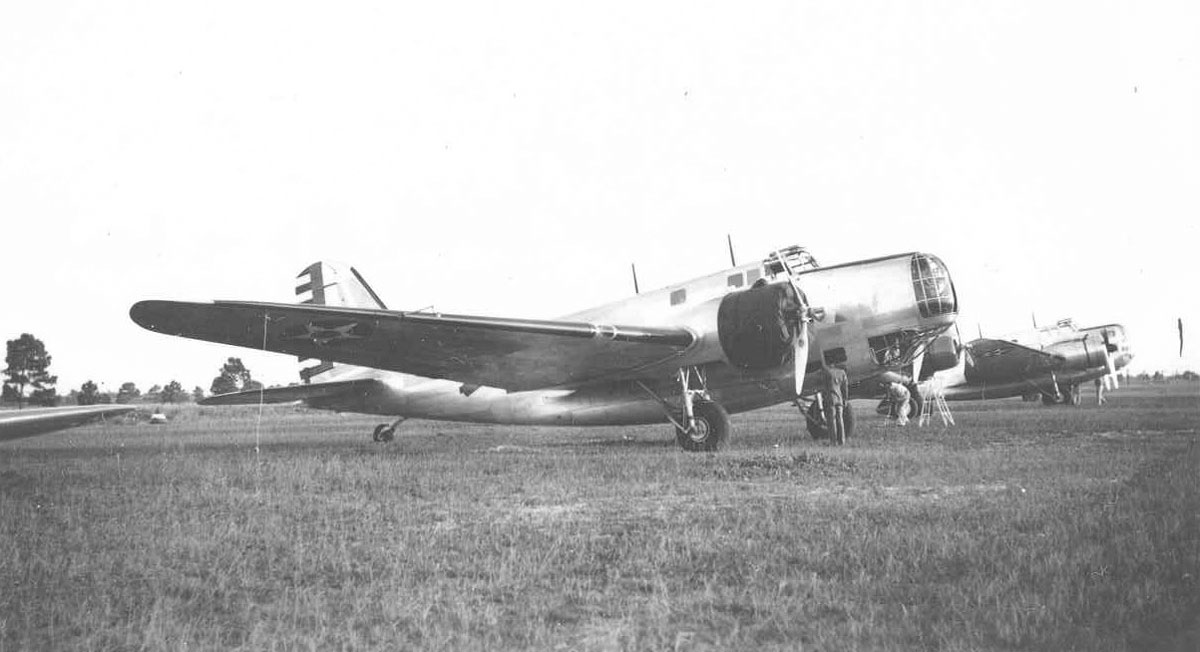
Douglas B-18s as flown by the 89th Reconnaissance Squadron

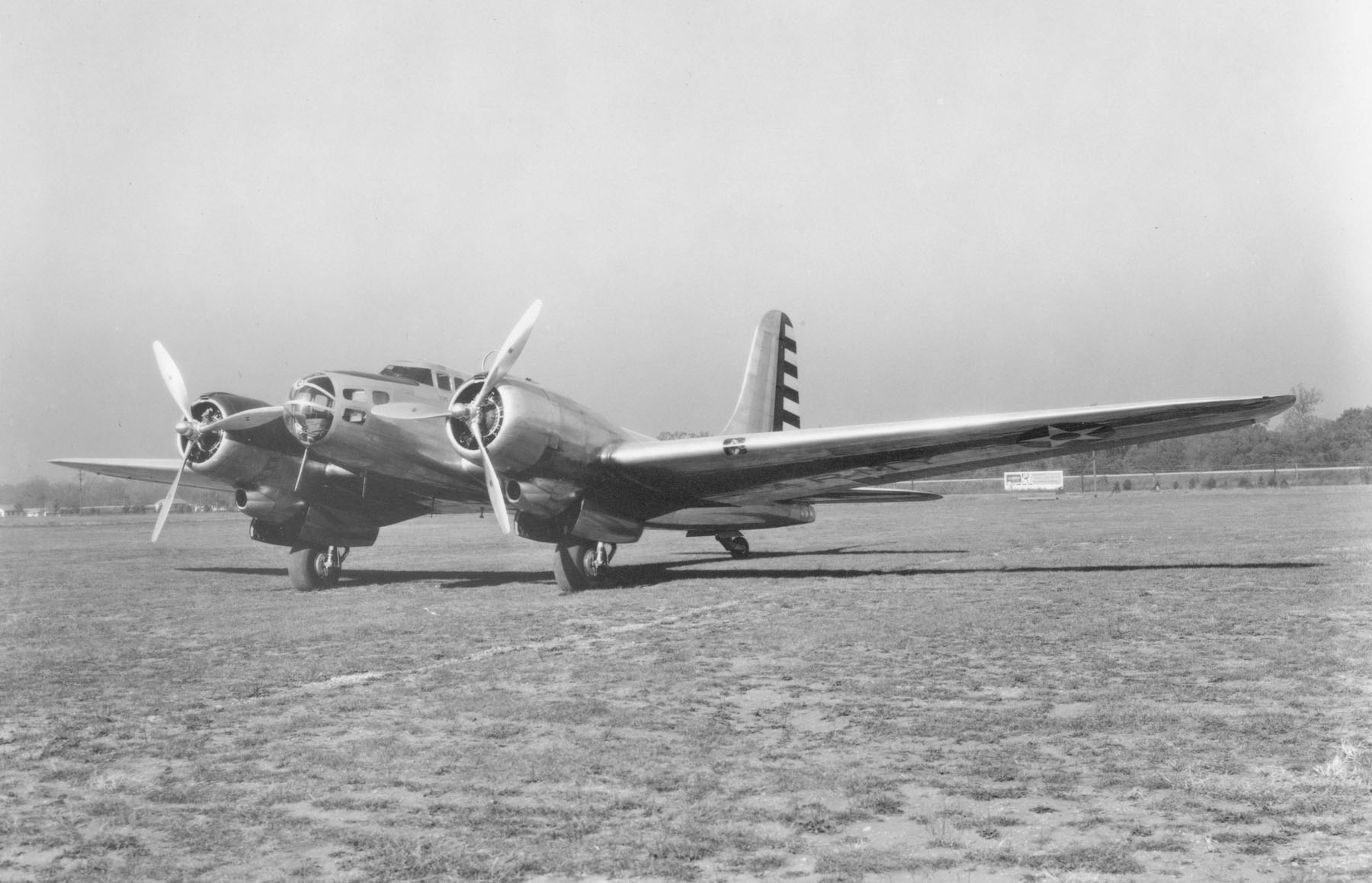
Douglas B-23 Dragon, which replaced the B-18

==== Initial organization ====
The second predecessor of the 89th was constituted as the 89th Observation Squadron on the inactive list in 1935. In October 1936, the two squadrons were consolidated as the 89th Reconnaissance Squadron, but remained inactive until February 1940. The squadron was activated and assigned to General Headquarters Air Force at March Field, California, but was attached to the 17th Bombardment Group. The squadron moved to McChord Field, Washington and was reassigned to Northwest Air District in June 1940, with its primary mission being reconnaissance with a secondary mission of bombardment. It was initially equipped with Douglas B-18 Bolos, but soon converted to Douglas B-23 Dragons.

In February 1941, the squadron replaced its B-23s with the new North American B-25 Mitchell medium bomber, when the 17th Group became the first Air Corps unit to receive the new bomber. In June, the squadron moved to Pendleton Field, Oregon. In August, it received the updated B-25B, which had a much heavier defensive armament, suggested by combat reports coming in from Europe.

==== Antisubmarine patrols ====
After Japan's attack on Pearl Harbor, the 89th flew antisubmarine patrols off the Oregon and Washington coastline. The 89th moved to Lexington County Airport, South Carolina in early 1942 to perform antisubmarine patrols over southeast Atlantic coast and the Gulf of Mexico. There it became the fourth bombardment squadron of the 17th Group as the 432d Bombardment Squadron.

==== Doolitte raid ====
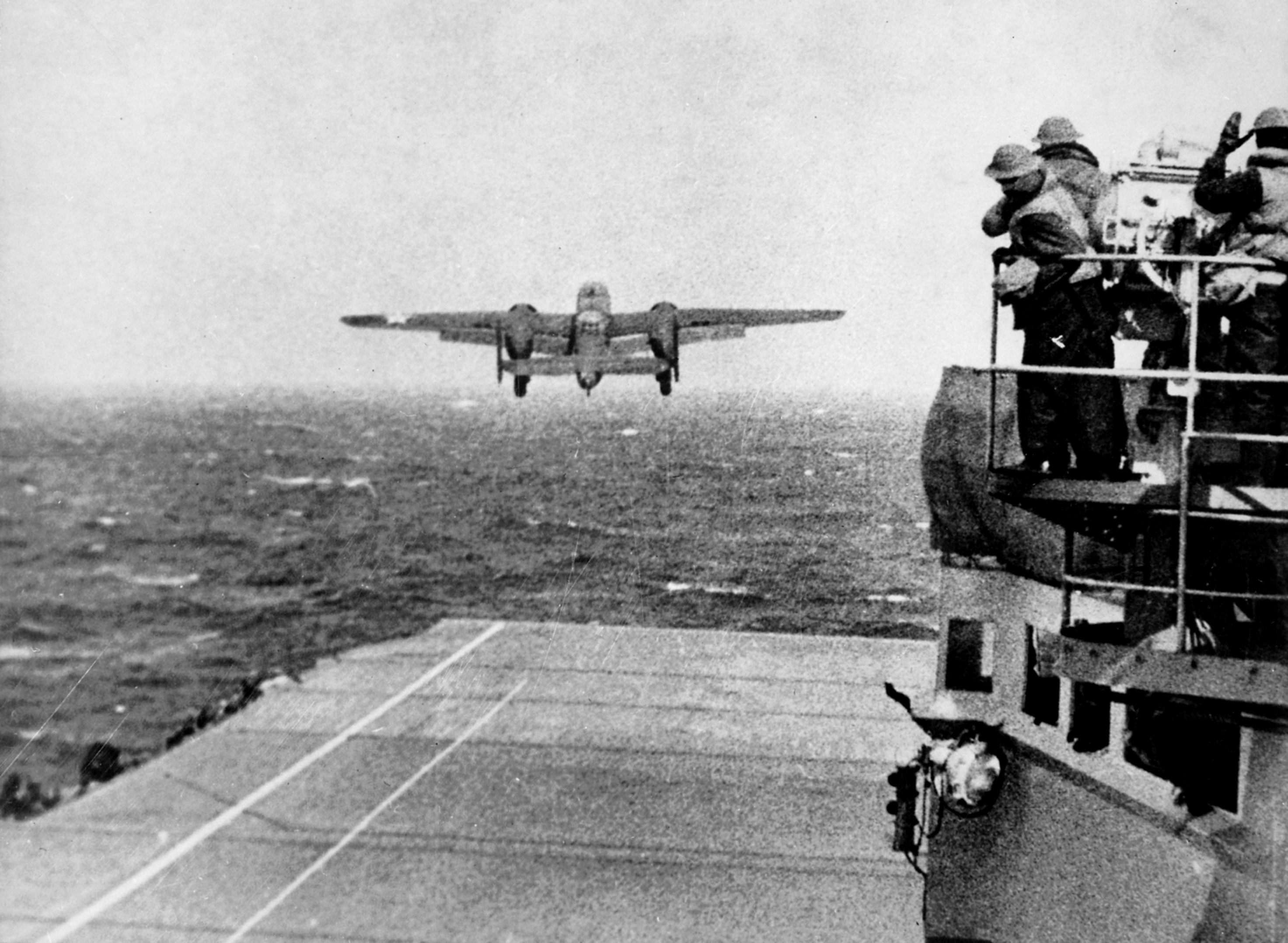
B-25 taking off for the Doolittle Raid

Planning for a retaliatory bombing raid on Japan began in December 1941, and twenty-four B-25Bs were diverted from the 17th Bombardment Group, which was the only B-25 unit in the Air Corps, and volunteers from its four squadrons, including the 89th, were recruited, the crews being told only that this was a secret and dangerous mission. The volunteers trained at Eglin Field, Florida. Upon completion of training, they left Eglin for McClellan Field, California for final modifications to the B-25s before moving to Naval Air Station Alameda, where the bombers were loaded on the USS Hornet (CV-8) for the raid.

==== Combat in the Mediterranean ====
The remainder of the squadron remained in Columbia, flying antisubmarine patrols until 23 June when it was moved to Barksdale Field, Louisiana. There, the squadron re-equipped with the Martin B-26 Marauder, and began transition training under Third Air Force.

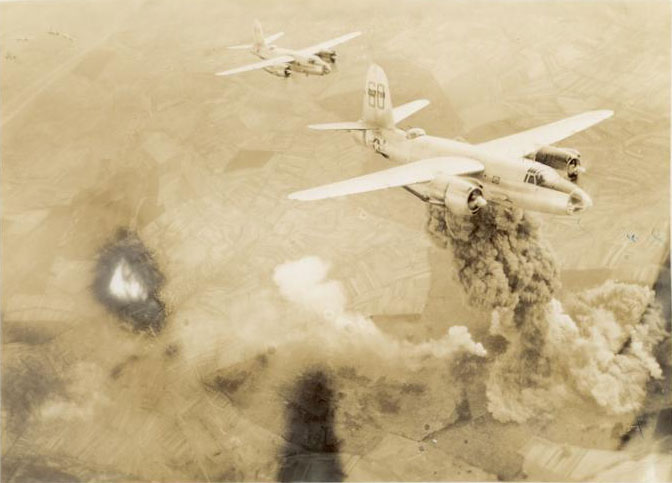
B-26 Marauders of the 432d Bombardment Squadron over Algeria

In November 1942, the squadron deployed to North Africa, arriving at Telergma Airport, Algeria in December 1942 following Operation Torch's initial landings, becoming part of XII Bomber Command. The squadron flew interdiction and close air support, bombing bridges, rail lines, marshalling yards, harbors, shipping, gun emplacements, troop concentrations and other enemy targets in Algeria and later Tunisia supporting American and later Allied ground forces as they moved east and participated in the Tunisian Campaign.

During 1943, the 34th participated in Operation Corkscrew, the reduction of Pantelleria. It supported Operation Husky, the Allied invasion of Sicily and Operation Avalanche, the invasion of Italy. During the drive toward Rome, the squadron was awarded a Distinguished Unit Citation for its attacks on airfields near Rome on 13 January 1944. It was also awarded the French Croix de Guerre with Palm for its operations in Italy between April and June.

The unit provided tactical air support in the liberation of Sardinia and Corsica. From airfields in Corsica, the 432d supported Allied ground forces during Operation Dragoon, the invasion of southern France in August 1944. It moved to Southern France and bombed enemy targets during the Allied drive northward. It earned a second Distinguished Unit Citation for bombing attacks on enemy defenses near Schweinfurt, Germany just before the end of the war on 10 April 1945.

The squadron remained in Europe after V-E Day. It became part of the occupation forces, and participated in the disarmament of Germany. It moved to the American Occupation Zone in Austria. The squadron returned to France to stage for its return to the United States, where it was inactivated in late November 1945.

=== Remotely piloted aircraft operations ===
The squadron was activated in October 2011 at Ellsworth Air Force Base, South Dakota as an MQ-9 Reaper squadron and assigned to the 28th Operations Group. The squadron replaced Detachment 1, 28th Operations Group, which had been activated in April 2011 to act as the lead organization to prepare Ellsworth for the activation of the remotely piloted aircraft unit. The squadron was reassigned from the 28th to the 432d Operations Group in October 2015 when the 28th Bomb Wing was reassigned to Air Force Global Strike Command. The following June, the squadron returned to its original number and became the 89th Attack Squadron.

In March 2019, the squadron was reassigned to the 25th Attack Group, located at Shaw Air Force Base, South Carolina. In May 2022, the squadron was recognized by General Atomics Aeronautical Systems as the MQ-9 Squadron of the Year for 2021. That year, the squadron provided protection to American and coalition forces across multiple combatant commands and other Department of Defense and government organizations. The squadron achieved the first network accredited MQ-9A simulator, integrating in joint exercises with twelve nations across three combatant commands. Its intelligence flight was also named Twelfth Air Force Intelligence Agency Team of the Year.

== Lineage ==
89th Aero Squadron

- Organized as the 89th Aero Squadron on 19 August 1917

Demobilized on 19 May 1919

- Reconstituted and consolidated on 24 October 1936 with the 89th Observation Squadron (Long Range, Light Bombardment) as the 89th Reconnaissance Squadron

89th Attack Squadron

- Constituted as the 89th Observation Squadron (Long Range, Light Bombardment) on 1 March 1935 (Note: This squadron is not related to an earlier 89th Observation Squadron that was constituted on 8 May 1929, redesignated the 89th Service Squadron on 1 October 1933 and disbanded in 1935 without being activated. Clay, p. 1433.)

Consolidated with the 89th Aero Squadron and redesignated 89th Reconnaissance Squadron on 24 October 1936 (remained inactive)
Redesignated 89th Reconnaissance Squadron (Medium Range) on 22 December 1939 (remained inactive)

- Activated on 1 February 1940

Redesignated 89th Reconnaissance Squadron (Medium) on 20 November 1940
Redesignated 432d Bombardment Squadron (Medium) on 22 April 1942
Redesignated 432d Bombardment Squadron, Medium on 9 October 1944

- Inactivated on 26 November 1945

Redesignated 432d Expeditionary Bomb Squadron and converted to provisional status on 16 January 2002
Redesignated 432d Bomb Squadron and withdrawn from provisional status on 16 February 2007 (remained inactive)
Redesignated 432d Attack Squadron on 1 September 2011

- Activated on 1 October 2011
- Redesignated 89th Attack Squadron on 21 June 2016

=== Assignments ===
- Unknown, 19 August 1917 – November 1917 (Note: Probably Post Headquarters, Kelly Field until October, then Aviation Concentration Center.)
- 1st Air Depot, c. 6 November 1917
- 2d Corps Aeronautical School, c. 17 February 1918 – c. 12 January 1919
- Unknown January – 19 May 1919
- Air Force Combat Command, 1 February 1940 (attached to 17th Bombardment Group)
- Northwest Air District (later 2d Air Force), June 1940 (remained attached to 17th Bombardment Group)
- 17th Bombardment Group, 25 February 1942 – 26 November 1945
- Pacific Air Forces, to activate or inactivate any time between 16 January 2002 and 16 February 2007
- 28th Operations Group: 1 October 2011 – 30 September 2015
- 432d Operations Group, 1 October 2015
- 25th Attack Group, 22 March 2019 – present

=== Stations ===
- Kelly Field, Texas, 19 August 1917
- Camp Mills, New York, c. 6 October 1917 – 27 October 1917
- Colombey-les-Belles Airdrome, France, 16 November 1917
- Châtillon-sur-Seine, France, 17 February 1918
- Saint-Nazaire, France, c. 14 January 1919 – unknown
- Garden City, New York, c. 25 March 1919 – 19 May 1919
- March Field, California, 1 February 1940
- McChord Field, Washington, 26 June 1940
- Pendleton Field, Oregon, 29 June 1941
- McChord Field, Washington, c. 30 December 1941
- Pendleton Field, Oregon, c. 24 January 1942
- Lexington County Airport (later Columbia Army Air Base), South Carolina, 15 February 1942
- Barksdale Field, Louisiana, 22 June 1942 – 18 November 1942
- Telergma Airport, Algeria, c. 22 December 1942
- Sedrata Airfield, Algeria, c. 13 May 1943
- Djedeida Airfield, Tunisia, c. 25 June 1943
- Villacidro Airfield, Sardinia, Italy, 5 November 1943
- Poretta Airport, Corsica, France, c. 21 September 1944
- Dijon Air Base, France, 22 November 1944
- AAF Station Linz, Austria, c. 18 June 1945
- Zell am See, Austria, 4 July 1945 (ground echelon)
- Clastres Airfield, France, c. 3 October 1945 – c. 17 November 1945 (ground echelon)
- Camp Myles Standish, Massachusetts, 25 November 1945 – 26 November 1945
- Ellsworth Air Force Base, South Dakota, 1 October 2011 – present

=== Aircraft ===
- Dorand AR and other types for training observers, 1918
- Breguet 14 when preparing for combat, 1918
- Douglas B-18 Bolo, 1940
- Douglas B-23 Dragon, 1940–1941
- North American B-25 Mitchell, 1941–1942
- Martin B-26 Marauder, 1942–1945
- General Atomics MQ-9 Reaper, 2011–present

=== Awards and campaigns ===
Award streamer	Award	Dates	Notes
	Distinguished Unit Citation	13 January 1944, Italy	432d Bombardment Squadron
	Distinguished Unit Citation	10 April 1945 Schweinfurt	432d Bombardment Squadron
	Air Force Meritorious Unit Award	1 May 2012-31 May 2013	432d Attack Squadron
	Air Force Meritorious Unit Award	1 June 2017-31 May 2018	89th Attack Squadron
	Air Force Meritorious Unit Award	1 June 2018-31 May 2020	89th Attack Squadron
	Air Force Outstanding Unit Award	1 June 2013-31 May 2014	432d Attack Squadron
	Air Force Outstanding Unit Award	1 June 2019-31 May 2021	89th Attack Squadron
	French Croix de Guerre with Palm	April, May and June 1944	432d Bombardment Squadron

Campaign Streamer	Campaign	Dates	Notes
	Theater of Operations	16 November 1917 – 1919	89th Aero Squadron
	Antisubmarine	7 December 1941 – 22 June 1942	89th Reconnaissance Squadron (Later 432d Bombardment Squadron)
	Tunisia	22 December 1942 – 13 May 1943	432d Bombardment Squadron
	Sicily	14 May 1943 – 17 August 1943	432d Bombardment Squadron
	Naples-Foggia	18 August 1943 – 21 January 1944	432d Bombardment Squadron
	Anzio	22 January 1944 – 24 May 1944	432d Bombardment Squadron
	Rome-Arno	22 January 1944 – 9 September 1944	432d Bombardment Squadron
	Southern France	15 August 1944 – 14 September 1944	432d Bombardment Squadron
	North Apennines	10 September 1944 – 4 April 1945	432d Bombardment Squadron
	Rhineland	15 September 1944 – 21 March 1945	432d Bombardment Squadron
	Central Europe	22 March 1944 – 21 May 1945	432d Bombardment Squadron
	Air Combat, EAME Theater	7 December 1941 – 11 May 1945	432d Bombardment Squadron
	World War II Army of Occupation	9 May 1945 – 3 October 1945	432d Bombardment Squadron

== See also ==
- List of American aero squadrons
- List of Martin B-26 Marauder operators
