= Wang Shu-ming =

Chinese pilot (1905–1998)

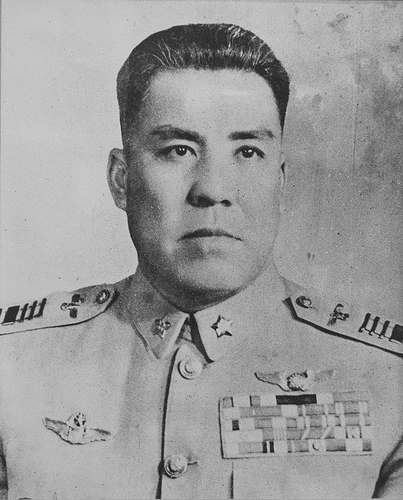

Personal details
- Born: November 10, 1905 Zhucheng, Shandong, Qing China
- Died: October 28, 1998 (aged 92) Taipei, Republic of China
- Party: Kuomintang
- Education: Republic of China Military Academy Guangdong Military Aviation School Lipetsk fighter-pilot school
- Occupation: Principal, Luoyang Aviation School Principal, Liuzhou Aviation School; Director of Education, Air Force Military School Ambassador to Jordan (April, 1972- May, 1975)

Military service
- Allegiance: Republic of China
- Branch/service: Republic of China Air Force
- Rank: Colonel General

Wang Shu-ming (November 10, 1905 – October 28, 1998) was a colonel general and a Chief of the General Staff of the Republic of China Air Force. He was born in Town of Xiangzhou, Zhucheng, Shandong, China.

== Biography ==
In 1924, Wang was admitted to the Republic of China Military Academy (1st term), then went to the Guangdong Military Aviation school in December. He attended the battle against warlords Yang Xiwen and Liu Zhenhuan in June 1925. In September 1925, Wang entered the Lipetsk fighter-pilot school in the Soviet Union and graduated in 1931. While studying in the Soviet Union, Wang joined the Chinese Communist Party, though he later cut the relations with the CCP when he came back to China. After he graduated, he became a flight Instructor at the Central Aviation School. Wang then served as an Air Force officer and director of Air Force schools. He participated in the Fourth Encirclement Campaign against Jiangxi Soviet, bombing the Fujian People's Government, and later during the War of Resistance-World War II at the Battle of Northern Burma and Western Yunnan, the Battle of West Hubei, the Battle of West Henan–North Hubei and others with his Air Group.

During the Second Chinese Civil War, Wang conducted various air attacks directed at Communist Militia in Northern Shaanxi. Under his command, the Air Force helped to seize the largest city CCP controlled, Zhangjiakou. He was awarded the Order of Blue Sky and White Sun (青天白日勋章) from his native ROC on August 14, 1944 and the Order of Golden Grain (嘉禾勋章) in June 1945. In 1946, Wang was promoted to vice-commander of the Air Force and major general, then lieutenant general in 1951. In March 1952, Wang became the commander-in-chief of Air Force and promoted to General. Wang then appointed as Chief Staff of the Ministry of National Defense, after his Commander term ended, and was succeeded by his student Chen Jia-shang.

In February 1962, Wang was sent to the United Nations and served as Air Force representative of China to the United Nations Security Council. In May 1972, Wang replaced Chen Jia-shang and became the Ambassador to Jordan until May 1975. After moving back to Taiwan, he served as Strategy Consultant for the President, and died in Taipei on October 28, 1998.

== See also ==
- Tang Duo (General) (Zh-Wiki), another early combat aviator from China who studied in the Soviet Union, and fmr. classmates at the Whampoa Military Academy.
