= LIVE OAK (planning group) =

Cold War multinational military planning group

LIVE OAK was the code name for a joint military planning group formed by the United States, United Kingdom, and France during the Cold War to plan for a response to any Soviet or Warsaw Pact aggression against West Berlin.

On 10 November 1958, Soviet Premier Nikita Khrushchev gave a speech in which he issued an ultimatum to the Western powers. He insisted that if the Western powers maintained a military presence in Berlin then the Soviets would sign a treaty with the socialist East German government, known as the German Democratic Republic (GDR). Because the United States was unwilling to recognize the GDR as a legitimate government, Khrushchev's declaration to assist them in "defending its borders" was threatening to the Western position in Berlin. A separate peace treaty between the Soviets and the GDR would put Western access to Berlin in the hands of the East Germans who warned the West to "negotiate its use of access routes into Berlin with [the East German] country or risk 'interruptions'." Khrushchev gave the Western powers six months to withdraw from Berlin and make it a free and demilitarized city. In February 1959, following the ultimatum speech, the United States, United Kingdom, and France "seriously examined the need for co-ordinating local responses to Soviet pressure in the Berlin area" in order to remain in the city and maintain their legal right of free access to West Berlin. The Soviet Union withdrew the deadline before it passed in 1959 and engaged in negotiations with the other powers.

The LIVE OAK group, controlled by the governments of the three countries and General Lauris Norstad, the Supreme Allied Commander Europe and the Commander in Chief, US European Command, developed military plans to respond to the crisis in Berlin. The main objective of this planning "was primarily directed at readying immediate responses to possible Soviet bloc interference with Western rights of access to Berlin in the air or on the ground." It had three main areas of military activity: small-scale military probes to determine Soviet and GDR intentions, the use of airlifts if appropriate, and readying controlled ground and tactical air forces for possible deployment. Some of the ground access plans were called 'Free Style', 'Back Stroke', 'Trade Wind', and 'Lucky Strike'. There were two air access plans added in 1960 called 'Jack Pine' and 'Qbal'. LIVE OAK was part of the contingency planning during the next Berlin Crisis of 1961, culminating in the city's de facto partition with the East German erection of the Berlin Wall. West German planners were invited to join the staff in 1961. The planning group continued to operate during the Cold War until it was no longer necessary in October 1990 with the German reunification and the end of the Western Allied occupation of West Berlin.

== See also ==
- Berlin Crisis of 1961
- West Berlin
