= 17th Bombardment Group =

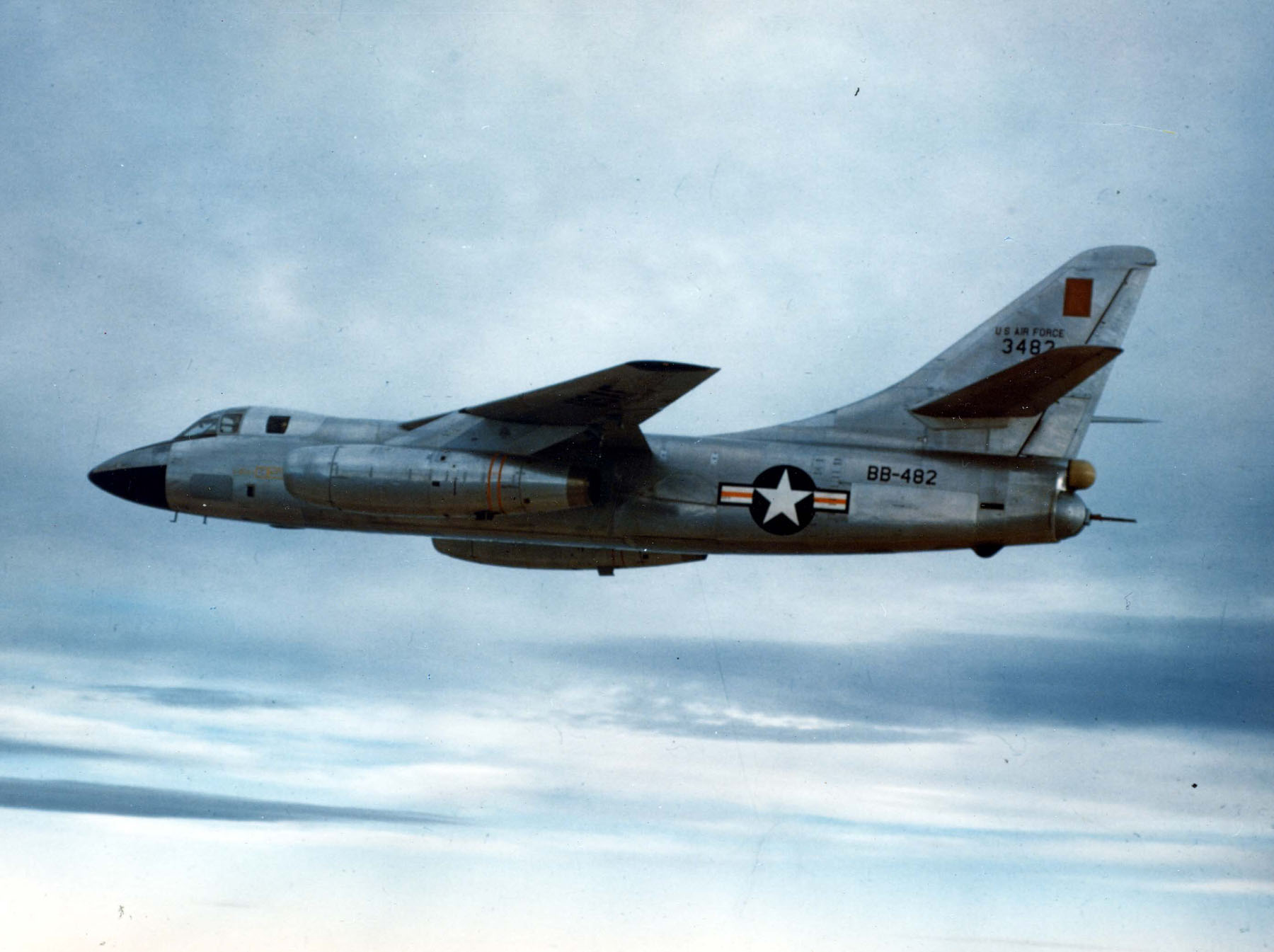
- Douglas B-66 as flown by the group
- Active: 1931–1945; 1947–1948; 1952–1958
- Country: United States
- Branch: United States Air Force
- Role: light bomber
- Size: Group
- Part of: Tactical Air Command
- Mottos: Toujours au Danger French; Ever into Danger
- Engagements: Doolittle Raid

Insignia
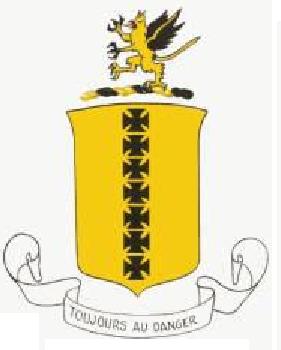
- 17th Bombardment Group emblem (Approved 19 January 1934)

The 17th Bombardment Group is an inactive United States Air Force unit. The group was last stationed at Hurlburt Field, Florida.

The Group is a direct successor to the 17th Pursuit Group, one of the 15 original combat air groups formed by the Army before World War II. The 17th's heritage traces back to World War I, when the 95th Aero Squadron played a key role in the St. Mihiel, Meuse-Argonne, and other Allied campaigns. These battles are symbolized by the seven pattee crosses on the 17th's shield, and it was from the 95th, together with the 34th and 73d Pursuit Squadrons, that the 17th first was formed.

The Group's aircraft and many of its aircrews took part in the 1942 Doolittle Raid on Imperial Japan. During World War II the 17th Bomb Group was the only combat organization to fight all three of the Axis powers (Japan, Italy, and Germany) on three continents (Asia, Africa, and Europe).

== History ==
=== Origins ===
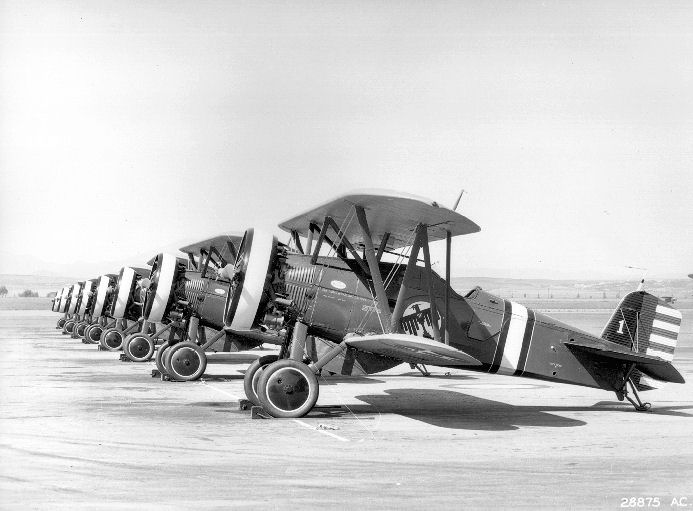
Boeing P-12Bs of the 34th Pursuit Squadron.

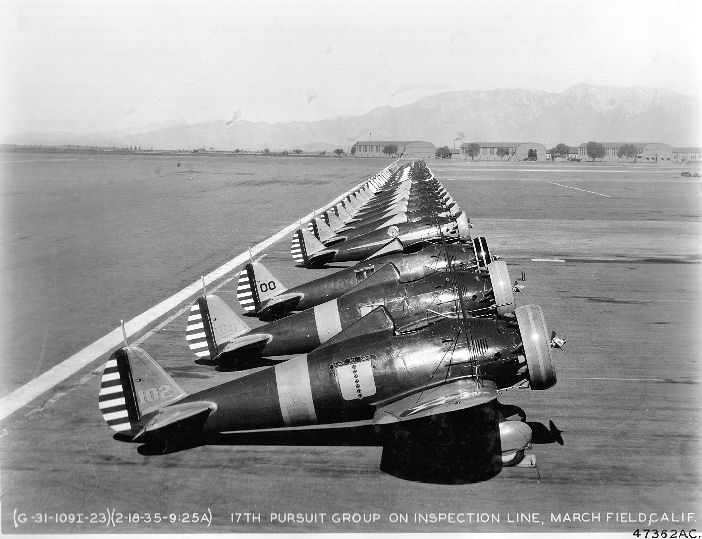
Boeing P-26A Peashooters of the 17th Pursuit Group, March Field, California.

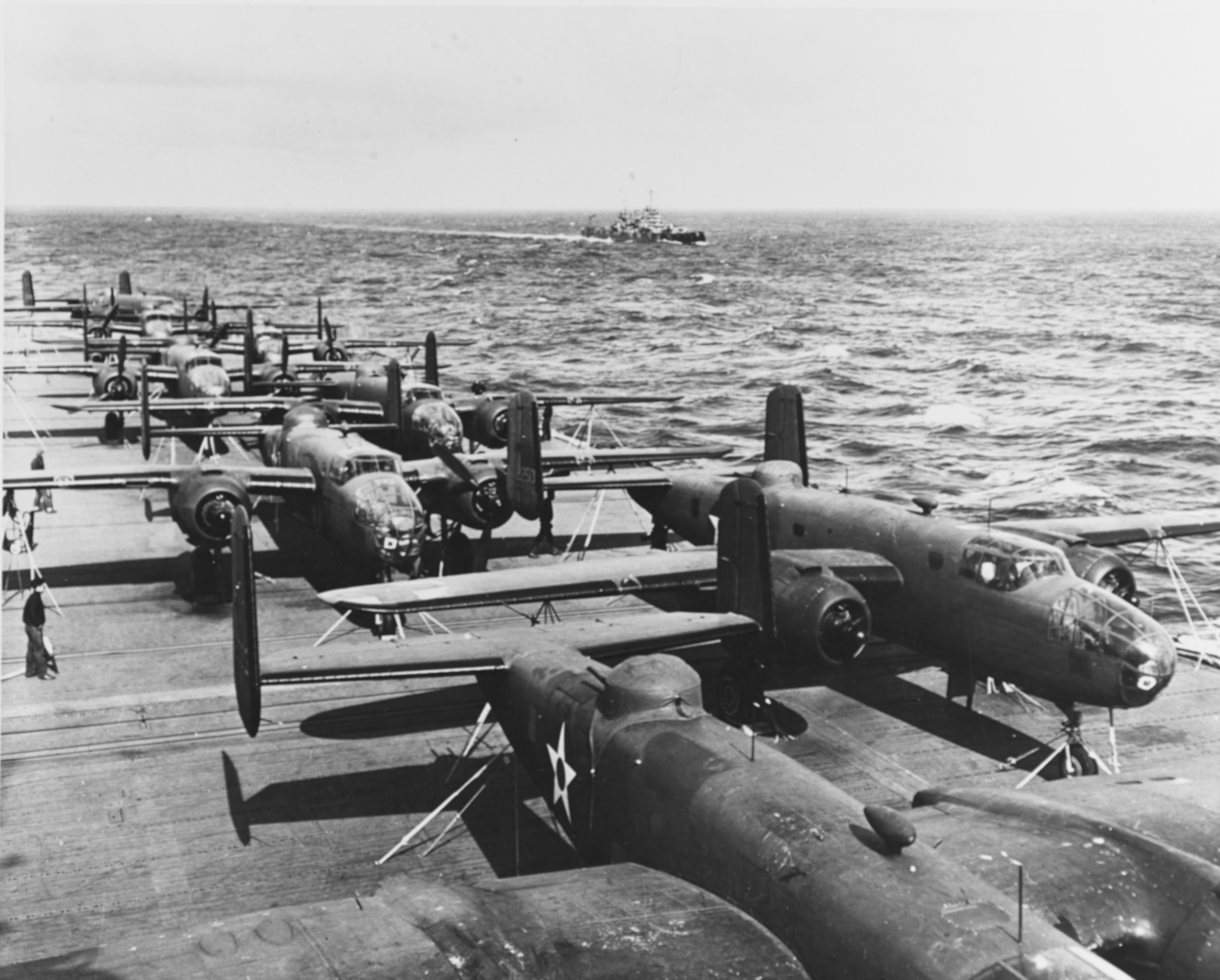
B-25Bs on USS Hornet en route to Japan.

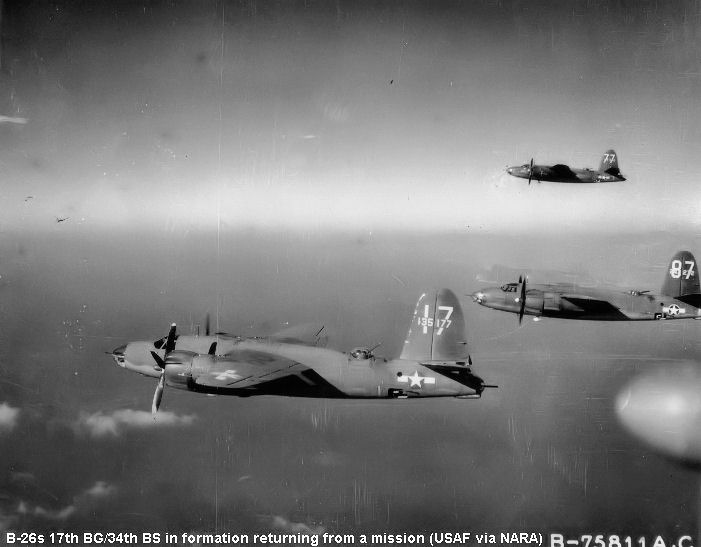
Martin B-26C Marauders of the 34th Bomb Squadron returning from a mission, 1944 41-35177 in foreground.

Authorized originally as the 17th Observation Group on 18 October 1927, the unit was redesignated the 17th Pursuit Group and finally activated at March Field, California, on 15 July 1931. At March, it operated Boeing P-12 and P-26 fighter aircraft until, in 1935, it was redesignated the 17th Attack Group and acquired the Northrop A-17 attack bomber. In 1939 the unit was redesignated again, becoming the 17th Bombardment Group (Medium) and converting to the Douglas B-18 Bolo bomber.

In August and September 1941 the group was the first to be equipped with the new North American B-25 Mitchell bomber. From its training base in Pendleton, Oregon, it deployed to Jackson, Mississippi; Augusta, Georgia and March Field in the fall of 1941 to participate in large scale maneuvers with the Army Ground Forces, returning to Pendleton immediately following the Japanese attack on Pearl Harbor.

=== World War II ===
From Pendleton, the 17th Bombardment Group flew anti-submarine patrols from Pendleton, Oregon, off the west coast of the United States. As the first unit to operate the B-25, the 17th achieved another "first" on 24 December 1941 when one of its Mitchells, flown by 1st Lt. Everett W. Holstrom, dropped four 300-pound bombs on a Japanese submarine near the mouth of the Columbia River.

==== Doolittle Raid ====
After the Doolittle Raid was approved in February 1942, the group was chosen to provide the crews from which volunteers would be recruited. It had been the first unit to receive B-25s, with all four of its squadrons equipped with the bomber by September 1941. It was not only was the first medium bomb group of the Army Air Corps, but in early 1942, also had the most experienced B-25 crews. Its first assignment following the entry of the United States into the war was to the U.S. Eighth Air Force.

The group was immediately moved from Pendleton cross-country to Columbia Army Air Base at West Columbia, South Carolina, ostensibly to fly similar patrols off the east coast of the United States, but in actuality to prepare for the mission against Japan. The group officially transferred effective 9 February 1942 to Columbia, where its combat crews were offered the opportunity to volunteer for an "extremely hazardous", but unspecified mission. On 19 February, the group was detached from the Eighth Air Force and officially assigned to III Bomber Command.

Initial planning called for 20 aircraft to fly the mission, and 24 of the group's B-25B Mitchell bombers were diverted to the Mid-Continent Airlines modification center in Minneapolis, Minnesota. With support provided by two senior airline managers, Wold-Chamberlain Field's maintenance hangar was the first modification center to become operational.

On the morning of 18 April 1942, some 600 miles east of Japan, the aircraft carrier USS Hornet launched 16 Mitchells on the highly successful Doolittle raid on Tokyo and other Japanese cities. A boost to American morale, the raid marked the first combat launch of twin engined bombers from an aircraft carrier and the first American aerial attack on the Japanese mainland. Piloting the 16th Mitchell was 1st Lt. William G. Farrow, captured and subsequently executed by the Japanese after completing his mission. Following the Doolittle raid, the group transferred to Barksdale Field, Louisiana, and began training on the Martin B-26 Marauder medium bomber.

==== Twelfth Air Force ====
In December the group transferred once more, this time to Telergma Airport, Algeria, where it participated in the North African campaign as part of Twelfth Air Force. The aircraft of the 17th Group left for Africa equipped with the Norden Bombsight, however only the leader of each flight carried the Norden, with the remainder dropping their bombs when the leader dropped. As German fighter opposition declined, the Marauder crews in the Mediterranean began removing the four package guns.

Upon the expulsion of Axis forces from North Africa in May 1943, the 17th transferred to Sedrata Airfield, Algeria, to begin air operations against Pantelleria. Five by eight miles in dimension, the Mediterranean island sheltered an important Axis airfield with hangars carved into solid rock. Its sheer cliffs would have proved a daunting obstacle to amphibious invasion but precision bombardment by the 17th secured the surrender of the island's defenders in less than a month.

As part of the Fifteenth Air Force, the group followed the Allied forces from North Africa from bases in Tunisia, Sardinia, Corsica, and France, the 17th conducted bombing missions against critical targets throughout the Mediterranean, Italy, southern France and Germany. It later returned to Twelfth Air Force in January 1944. It received a Distinguished Unit Citation for its support of the Anzio invasion and another for its outstanding performance over Schweinfurt. For operations in support of the invasion of southern France, it received the French Croix de Guerre with Palm. All told, the group conducted 624 missions and participated in 11 campaigns during the war, finally returning to the United States and inactivating in November 1945.

=== Korean War ===
With war in Korea the group was activated to replace the Air Force Reserve 452d Bombardment Group when its term of service was up in May 1952. Assigned to Far East Air Forces, being stationed at Pusan East (K-9) Air Base, South Korea, in May 1952. There, the group flew Douglas B-26 Invader light bombers on night intruder strikes along enemy supply routes. In August, the group switched to daylight formation raids, earning the Republic of Korea Presidential Unit Citation by the end of the war in July 1953. It flew one of the last if not the last mission of the Korean War.

=== Cold War ===
On 10 October 1954 the unit received orders to move to Miho AFB, Japan. This move was accomplished and training operations commenced from Japan. The group was to be re outfitted with Martin B-57 Canberra's, the new jet light bomber. On 26 January 1955, due to problems in the B-57 program, this decision was reversed and the unit was directed to transfer with 39 aircraft to Hurlburt Auxiliary Field, Florida. Training flights continued through January. In February, all flying except that concerned with cruise control missions was terminated. The aircraft were stripped of all armament (guns, turrets, sighting equipment and rocket racks) and fitted with 625 gallon auxiliary tanks. On 16 April the first section of 4 aircraft departed. The last section departed on 19 April. Either a B-29 or a C-124, as a lead ship, escorted each flight of four aircraft. The last aircraft landed in Hulburt on 29 April.

At Hurlburt, was redesignated the 17th Bombardment Group, Tactical and the unit transitioned to the Martin B-57 Canberra and Douglas B-66 Destroyer medium bombers before inactivating again in 1958 due to budgetary cuts. Group was eliminated from Wing's table of organization as part of the Air Force tri-deputate reorganization.

== Lineage ==
- Authorized as the 17th Observation Group on 18 October 1927

Redesignated 17th Pursuit Group in 1929
Activated on 15 July 1931
Redesignated 17th Attack Group c. 1 March 1935
Redesignated 17th Bombardment Group (Medium) c. 17 October 1939
Inactivated on 26 November 1945

- Redesignated 17th Bombardment Group, Light and activated on 19 May 1947

Inactivated on 10 September 1948

- Activated on 10 May 1952

Redesignated 17th Bombardment Group, Tactical on 1 October 1955
Inactivated on 25 June 1958

=== Assignments ===
- 1st Wing, 1 March 1935
- GHQ Air Force, 24 June 1940

Remained under jurisdiction of 1st Wing

- Northwest Air District (later Second Air Force), 19 October 1940
- 5th Bombardment Wing, 10 December 1940 – 25 May 1941
- II Bomber Command, 25 May 1941
- III Bomber Command, 19 February 1942
- Northwest African Training Command, 9 December 1942
- Northwest African Strategic Air Force, 20 April 1943
- XII Bomber Command, 1 September 1943
- 42d Bombardment Wing, 24 August 1943 – 29 May 1945
- XXII Tactical Air Command, 29 May-26 November 1945
- Ninth Air Force, 19 May 1947 – 10 September 1948
- 17th Bombardment Wing, 10 May 1952 – 25 June 1958

=== Components ===
- 34th Bombardment Squadron: 15 July 1931 – 26 November 1945; 19 May 1947 – 10 September 1948; 10 May 1952 – 25 June 1958
- 37th Bombardment Squadron: 23 April 1941 – 26 November 1945; 19 May 1947 – 10 September 1948; 10 May 1952 – 25 June 1958
- 73d Bombardment Squadron (USAAC), 15 July 1931 – 3 May 1941
- 89th Reconnaissance Squadron: attached during December 1941
- 95th Bombardment Squadron: 15 July 1931 – 26 November 1945; 19 May 1947 – 10 September 1948; 10 May 1952 – 25 June 1958
- 432d Bombardment Squadron: 25 February 1942 – 26 November 1945

=== Stations ===
- March Field, California, 15 July 1931
- McChord Field, Washington, 24 June 1940
- Pendleton Airport, Oregon, 29 July 1941
- Columbia Army Air Base, South Carolina, 9 February 1942
- Barksdale Field, Louisiana, 23, June–November 1942
- Telergma Airfield, Algeria, December 1942
- Sedrata Airfield, Algeria, c, 10 May 1943
- Djedeida Airfield, Tunisia, 23 June 1943
- Sardinia, November 1943
- Corsica, c. 14 September 1944
- Dijon-Longvic Airfield (Y-9), France, c. 20 November 1944
- Fliegerhorst Hörsching, Austria, June 1945
- Clastres Airfield (A-71), France, c. 3 October–November 1945
- Langley Field, Virginia, 19 May 1947 – 10 September 1948
- Pusan East (K-9) Air Base, South Korea, 10 May 1952
- Miho Air Base, Japan, 10 October 1954 – 16 March 1955
- Eglin AF Aux Field No 9, Florida, April 1955 – 25 June 1958

=== Aircraft assigned ===
- Boeing P-12 and P-26 Peashooter, 1931–1933
- Northrop A-17, 1933–1939
- Douglas B-18 Bolo, 1939–1941
- North American B-25 Mitchell, 1941–1942
- Martin B-26 Marauder 1942–1945
- Douglas A-26 (later B-26) Invader, 1947–1948; 1952–1954
- Martin B-57 Canberra, 1954–1958
- Douglas B-66 Destroyer, 1954–1958

== See also ==
- List of Martin B-26 Marauder operators
