= Chen Jia-shang =

Republic of China general

Chen Jia-shang (陳嘉尚)
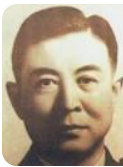

Personal details
- Born: March 1909 Hangzhou, Zhejiang, Qing China
- Died: March 6, 1972 (aged 62–63) Taipei, Republic of China
- Party: Kuomintang
- Education: Ambassador to Jordan (1967 - 1972)

Military service
- Allegiance: (Taiwan) Republic of China
- Branch/service: Republic of China Air Force
- Rank: Colonel General

Chen Jia-Shang (Chinese: 陳嘉尚 - pinyin: Chén Jiashang) (March 1909 - March 6, 1972) was a colonel general of the Republic of China Air Force and the Third Commander in Chief of the ROCAF whose term spanned July 1, 1957 to July 1, 1963. He also served as the ambassador to Jordan from 1967 until his death in 1972.

== Biography ==
Chen was a graduate of the 6th Term of National Military Academy, the class of the 1st Term of the National Aviation Academy, and assumed the position as the Commander-in-Chief of the Republic of China Air Force on July 1, 1957, and served until July 1, 1963. Chen fought in the Central Plains War while as a cadet of the National Aviation Academy in 1930, and also in the Battle of Shanghai, the battles with the Chinese Red Army in Fujian and Jiangxi, and various battles in the Second Sino-Japanese War. In these battles, General Chen drove the fighter planes by himself or with his co-pilot and First Officer Chin Hsieh. Chen also led the ROCAF in many battles of the Chinese Civil War.

In 1928, Chen was admitted to the ROC Army Officer School and selected as a student in the aviating training class in 1929. After graduating in 1931, he enrolled at the Italian Air Force Academy to study. After returning to China in 1932, he served as a second and third flight instructor at the Central Aviation School.

In 1949, Chen went to Taiwan to construct an air base and served as the Deputy Commander of the Air Defense Command, the Deputy Commander-in-Chief of the ROC Air Force Headquarters and the Commander of the Combat Command. In 1957, specifically on July 1, 1957, he served as Commander-in-Chief of the ROC Air Force and was promoted to second-level General of the ROC Air Force the following year in 1958.

During the Second Taiwan Strait Crisis in August 1958, Chen won over the PLA airforce with a record of 31:1.

In the 1960s, Chen served successively as a member of the 8th, 9th, and 10th Central Committee of the Kuomintang. Chen succeeded his teacher and mentor, Wang Shuming as Chief Staff of the Ministry of National Defense. Chen also served as Ambassador to Jordan from 1967 until his death in 1972, when he was replaced by Wang Shuming. On March 6, 1972, Chen died of cirrhosis at the Taipei Veterans General Hospital at age 63.

== Accolades ==
- The Cauldron Medal
- The Sky Command Medal
- The Loyalty and Service Award
- The Celestial Kindness Medal
- The Recovery Medal
- The Victory Medal
- The Land, Sea and Air Award
- The Model Award
- The Literate Award
- The Victory in War of Resistance Award
- The US Commander Achievement Award
- The Crown Medal of Thailand
- The Grand Cross of Spain Medal
- The Star of Jordan Medal
- The Grand Cross of Peru Medal
- The National Emblem of Jordan Medal

== See also ==
- Wang Shuming - Chen's teacher and mentor
- Tang Duo (General) (Zh-Wiki), another early combat aviator from China who studied in the Soviet Union, and fmr. classmates with Wang Shuming at the Whampoa Military Academy.
