= USS Hornet =

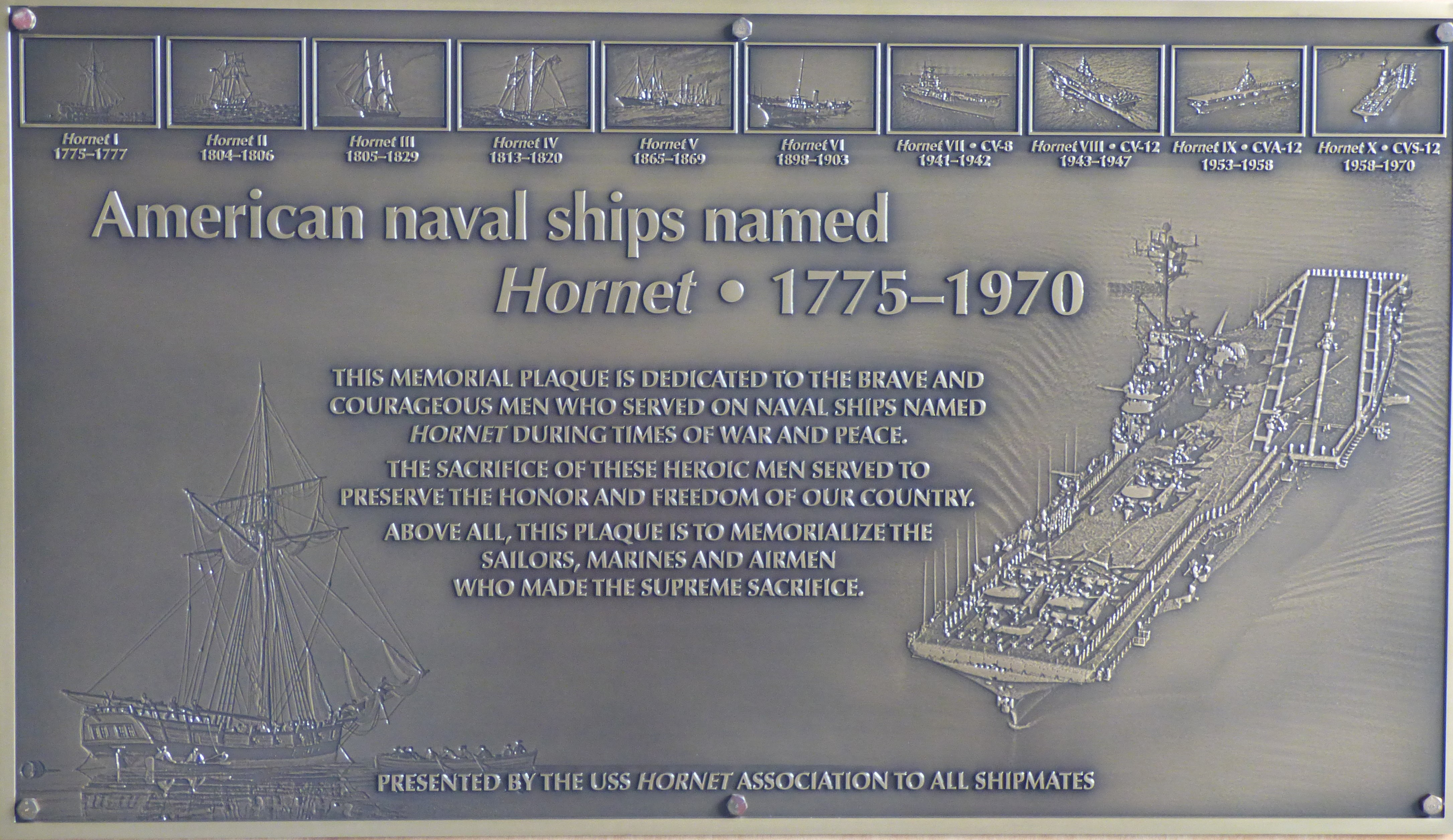
Memorial Plaque for American naval ships named Hornet from 1775 to 1970

Eight ships of the United States Navy have been named USS Hornet, after the stinging insect:

- USS Hornet (1775), a 10-gun sloop commissioned in 1775, served in the American Revolutionary War.
- USS Hornet (1805 sloop), also a 10-gun sloop, took part in the First Barbary War.
- USS Hornet (1805 brig), a brig-rigged sloop-of-war, was launched on 28 July 1805 and sank in a storm on 29 September 1829.
- USS Hornet (1813) was a five-gun schooner used as a dispatch vessel between 1814 and 1820.
- USS Hornet (1865), the first to be steam propelled, was an iron, side-wheeled steamer.
- USS Hornet (1898), a converted yacht, was a dispatch vessel in the Spanish–American War.
- USS Hornet (CV-8) launched the Doolittle Raid in 1942, fought at the Battle of Midway, and was sunk at the Battle of the Santa Cruz Islands on 26 October 1942.
- USS Hornet (CV-12) was originally named Kearsarge, but renamed in honor of CV-8 and active through the rest of World War II, as well as portions of the Vietnam War. She later served as the recovery vessel for Apollo 11 and 12 in 1969, before decommissioning the following year. She is preserved as a museum ship in Alameda, California.
