= Chen Pao-yu =

Taiwanese general officer

General Chen Pao-yu
- 陳寶餘
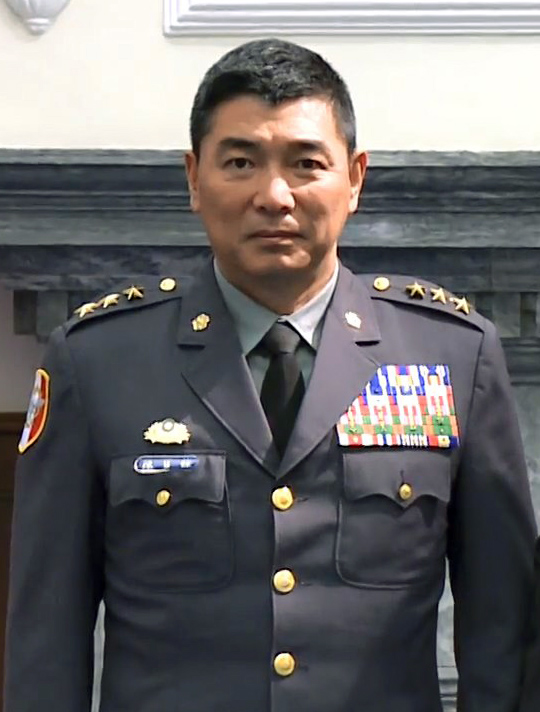

29th Chief of the General Staff of the Republic of China Armed Forces
- In office July 1, 2021 – April 30, 2023
- Preceded by: Huang Shu-kuang
- Succeeded by: Mei Chia-shu

Commander of the Republic of China Army
- In office 1 April 2019 – July 1, 2021
- Preceded by: Wang Shin-lung
- Succeeded by: Hsu Yen-pu

Personal details
- Born: 1958 (age 68) Dongyin Township, Lienchiang County, Fujian Province, ROC
- Education: Republic of China Military Academy (BS); National Defense University (MS)

Military service
- Allegiance: Republic of China
- Branch/service: Republic of China Army
- Years of service: 1976–2023
- Rank: General
- Commands: Chief of the General Staff; Commander of the Army; Vice Chief (Executive) of the General Staff; 10th Army Corps; Head of J3, Deputy Chief of the General Staff for Operations & Planning; Hua-Tung Defense Command; Head of Army S3, Army Deputy Chief of the General Staff for Operations & Planning; 295th Brigade

General Chen Pao-yu (Chinese: 陳寶餘; born 1958) is a Republic of China Army General who served as the Chief of the General Staff of the Republic of China Armed Forces from July 1, 2021 to April 30, 2023. Prior to his appointment, Chief of the Army Staff Taiwan from April 2019 to July 2021 and served as the Vice Chief (Executive) of the General Staff in April 2017 to 2019.

== Early life and education ==
Born in Lienchiang County, Fujian Province, ROC, Chen graduated from Chinese Military Academy in 1976 (Class 69) and also attended the Infantry Captain course at the Army Command and Staff Course Class of 1994 (Class 83) and completed the War College Academy Class of 1999 (Class of 88) at the National Defense University. He also attended in various courses and received degrees from universities and military academies locally and abroad.

== Military background ==
After graduating in the military academy in 1976, Chen held various posts in the Army and in the Armed Forces. He held various posts in the 129th Brigade, before leading various units such as the 295th Brigade, and also served as the Head of Army S3, the army's operations and planning division. Chen also served at the Combat Readiness Training Division, as the Deputy Commanding General 6th Army Corps in the country's northern areas, and as the Commanding General of Hua-Tung Defense Command in the country's southern areas. Chen also served as the Head of J3, the Office of the Deputy Chief of Operations and Planning Staff, the Chief of War Training Division at the Army Headquarters, and as the Commanding General of the 10th Army Corps in Central Taiwan.

In November 2017, he, along with other Navy and Defense Ministry officials was questioned by Tseng Ming-chung, along with other legislators of the Legislative Yuan, regarding the Qingfu mine hunting case, a scandal involving US company Lockheed Martin and Italian firm Intermarine S.p.A. on the acquisition of six mine countermeasure vessels for the Republic of China Navy for an undisclosed amount. In the aftermath of the 2018 Hualien earthquake, Chen served as the overall commander of overall humanitarian operations and assistance missions.

Chen was named as the Vice Chief (Executive) of the General Staff of the Republic of China Armed Forces from 28 April 2017 to 1 April 2019, replacing Admiral Pu Tze-chun, where he was instrumental in the army's reforms to counter the People's Liberation Army's offensive strategies in times of war, as he launched the improvement of scientific training methods in order to improve soldiers' overall physical fitness, strengths and capabilities. On 1 April 2019, Chen served as the Commander of the Army, replacing General Wang Shin-lung. He served his position until July 2021, as Chen succeeded Huang Shu-kuang as Chief of the General Staff on 1 July 2021, making him the first general from the Matsu Islands to be named as the Chief of the General Staff.

On May 1, 2022, Chen was due for retirement from military service, yet his term was eventually extended by former president Tsai Ing-wen for another year, which is aimed for the continuity of his leadership in the island's national defense policy and other military planning initiatives. Chen's extended term expired on April 30, 2023 and was replaced by then-Navy Commander Mei Chia-shu.

== Awards from military service ==
- Order of the Sacred Tripod with Grand Cordon (awarded on April 27, 2023)
- Order of the Cloud and Banner with Grand Cordon (awarded on July 1, 2021)
- Order of the Cloud and Banner with Yellow Grand Cordon (awarded on April 2, 2019)
- Order of the Cloud and Banner with Special Cravat
- 2 Order of Loyalty and Diligence medals
- Medal of the Brilliant Light, A-Second Class
- Medal of Victorious Garrison, A-First Class ribbon
- Medal of Army Brilliance, A Class
- Medal of Outstanding Service, A Class
- 4 Ribbons, Medal of Outstanding Staff, A Class
- 4 Ribbons, Medal of Army Achievement, A Class
