= Shen Yi-ming =

Taiwanese general (1957-2020)

Senior General of the Air Force Shen Yi-ming
- 沈一鳴
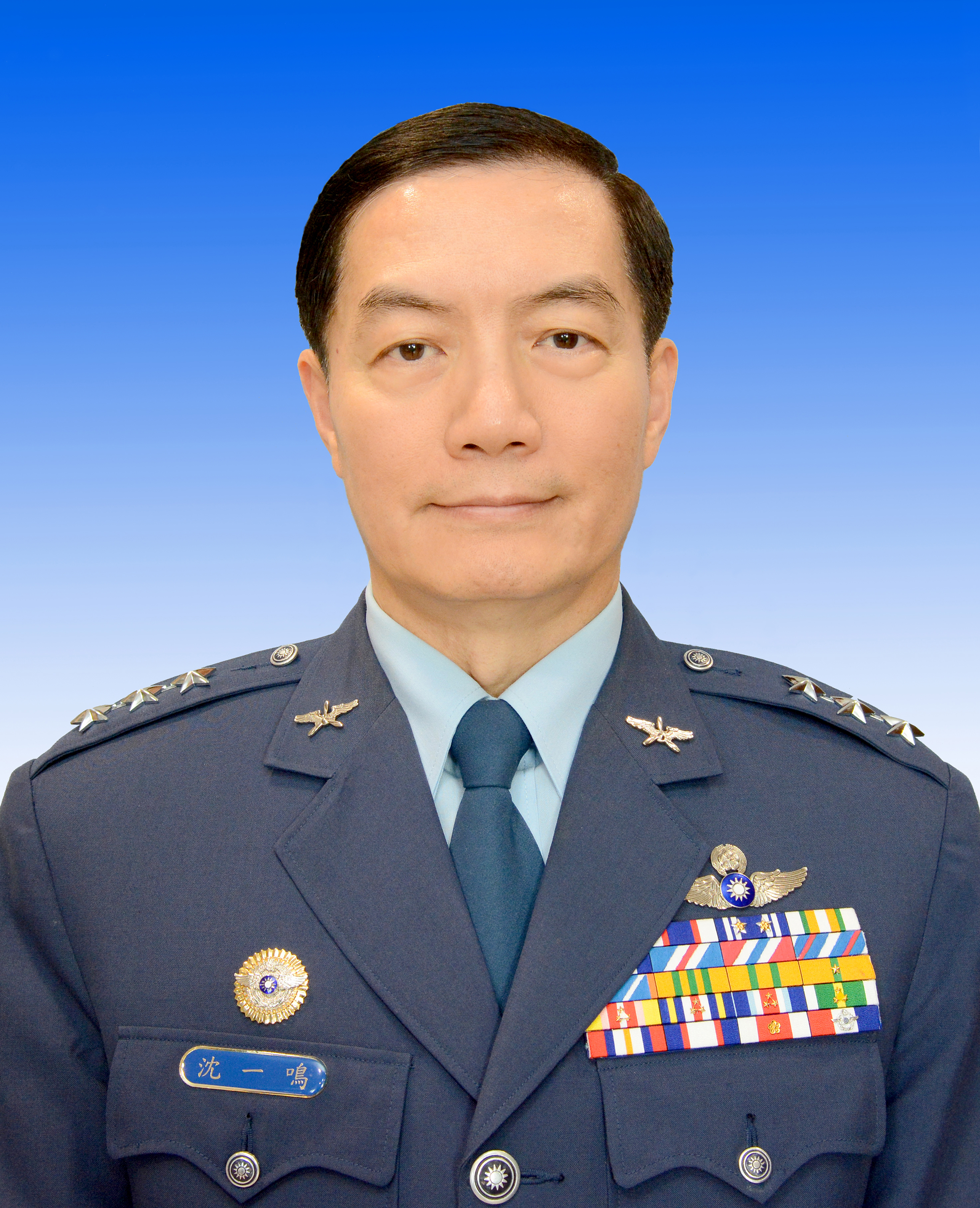
- Gen. Shen Yi-ming in uniform

27th Chief of the General Staff of the Republic of China Armed Forces
- In office 1 July 2019 – 2 January 2020
- Deputy: Liu Chih-pin
- Preceded by: Lee Hsi-ming
- Succeeded by: Liu Chih-pin (acting); Huang Shu-kuang

12th Deputy Minister (Policy) of National Defense of the Republic of China
- In office 1 March 2018 – 30 June 2019 Serving with Chang Guan-chung
- Minister: Yen Teh-fa
- Preceded by: Pu Tze-chun
- Succeeded by: Chang Che-ping

6th Commander of the Republic of China Air Force
- In office 30 January 2015 – 28 February 2018
- Preceded by: Liu Chen-wu
- Succeeded by: Chang Che-ping

Personal details
- Born: 30 March 1957 Shilin, Taipei, Taiwan
- Died: 2 January 2020 (aged 62) Wulai, New Taipei, Taiwan
- Cause of death: Helicopter accident
- Education: Republic of China Air Force Academy (BA); National Defense University; Air War College (MS)

Military service
- Allegiance: Republic of China
- Branch/service: Republic of China Air Force
- Years of service: 1975–2020
- Rank: Senior General (posthumously promoted)
- Unit: Chief of the General Staff; Commanding General of the Air Force

Chinese name
- Traditional Chinese: 沈一鳴
- Simplified Chinese: 沈一鸣
Transcriptions
Standard Mandarin
- Hanyu Pinyin: Shěn Yīmíng
- Wade–Giles: Shen I-ming
- IPA: [ʂə̀n í.mǐŋ]
Southern Min
- Hokkien POJ: Sím It-bêng
- Tâi-lô: Sím It-bîng

Shen Yi-ming (Chinese: 沈一鳴; Wade–Giles: Shen I-ming; 30 March 1957 – 2 January 2020) was a Taiwanese military officer who served as a Republic of China Air Force general and the Chief of the General Staff, Deputy Minister of National Defense for Policy, and Commander of the ROC Air Force.

On 2 January 2020, he was killed in a military helicopter crash while on a routine mission.

== Early life and education ==
Shen was born in Shilin, Taipei, Taiwan in 1957. His ancestral home is in Yixing, Wuxi, Jiangsu. He graduated from the Republic of China Air Force Academy in 1979, where his general officer classmates included General Wu Wan-chiao (吳萬教) and Lieutenant General Ko Wen-an (柯文安). He graduated from the Air Command and Staff College in 1992 and from the Air War College in the United States in 2002.

== Military career ==
He trained in Saudi Arabia for one year as part of the Peace Bell Program (known as Great Desert Program in Taiwan), active between 1975 and 1990. After the Republic of China Air Force acquired Mirage 2000-5 jets from France in the 1990s, he was one of the first Taiwanese pilots to be trained in their operation. Shen held positions in the Air Force such as the Deputy Commander of the Office of the Deputy Joint Chief of the General Staff in Intelligence, Air Force Combatant Command, Deputy Chief of the Air Force Staff, Deputy Minister of National Defense for Administrative Affairs, and served as Commanding General of the Air Force from 1 February 2015 to 1 March 2018.

== Deputy Defense Minister and Chief of the General Staff ==
Shen succeeded Admiral Pu Tze-chun as vice minister of defense for policy in March 2018, serving under Yen Teh-fa. As vice defense minister, Shen promoted international military exchanges with the United States. In regards to United States President Donald Trump, he has stated “We greatly appreciate that the US is willing to review our military sales requests on a case-by-case basis, instead of the bundling approach carried out previously", referring to military exchanges between the US and Taiwan. Shortly after that comment, Taiwan signed a US$330 million deal to upgrade 144 F-16 fighter jets to the F-16V standard. In July 2019, Shen replaced Admiral Lee Hsi-ming as Chief of the General Staff of the Republic of China Armed Forces.

== Death ==
Shen was killed in a helicopter accident on 2 January 2020 in the Wulai District of New Taipei. The Black Hawk Shen was traveling in lost contact with Songshan military airbase at 8:07 AM, thirteen minutes after taking off. The helicopter was carrying three crew, nine officers—including Shen—and a correspondent from the Military News Agency. Seven others of those aboard the helicopter were also killed in the crash, including two Major Generals, while five others were injured and survived. Shen's remains were cremated on 14 January 2020, and buried at Wuzhi Mountain Military Cemetery. A memorial ceremony for the crash victims was held at Songshan Air Force Base on 14 January 2020.

On January 3, Shen was posthumously awarded the Order of Blue Sky and White Sun with Grand Cordon, and promoted to Full General by President Tsai Ing-wen. The Ministry of National Defense awarded Shen a National Emblem Medal.

== Awards ==
- Order of the Cloud and Banner with Special Cravat
- Order of Loyalty and Diligence
- Medal of the Brilliant Light, B-Second Class
