= Huang Shu-kuang =

Taiwanese admiral

Admiral Huang Shu-kuang
- 黃曙光
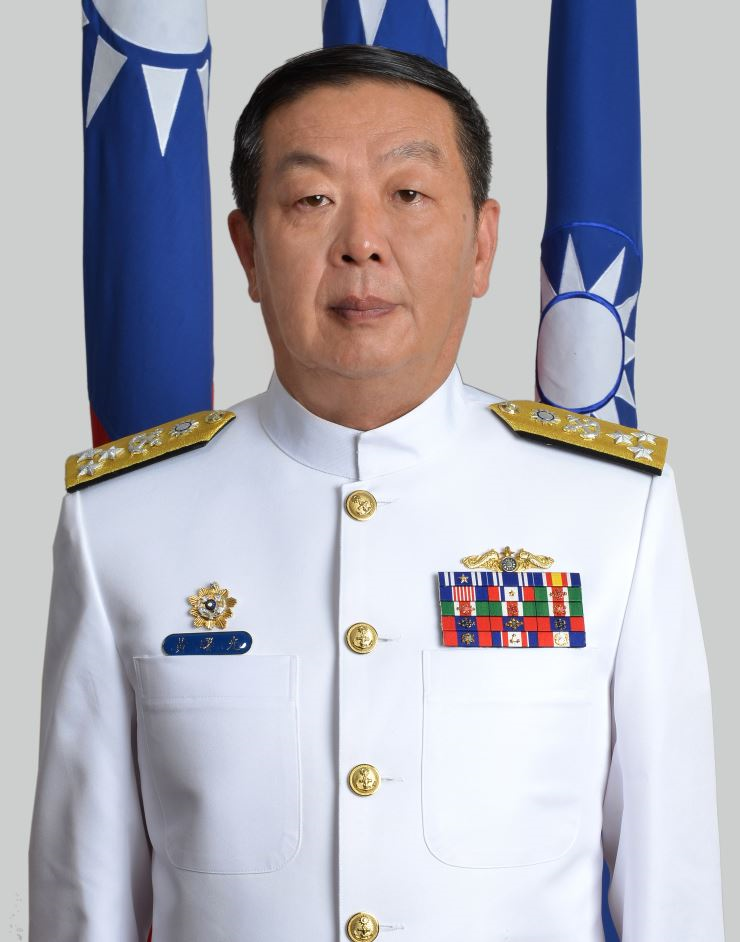
- Official portrait, 2016

Member of the National Security Council
- In office 5 September 2021 – 28 September 2025
- President: Tsai Ing-wen; Lai Ching-te
- Secretary General: Wellington Koo; Joseph Wu

28th Chief of the General Staff of the ROC Armed Forces
- In office 16 January 2020 – 1 July 2021
- Preceded by: Liu Chih-pin (acting)
- Succeeded by: Chen Pao-yu

7th Commander of the ROC Navy
- In office 1 June 2016 – 15 January 2020
- Deputy: Pan Chin-lung
- Preceded by: Lee Hsi-ming
- Succeeded by: Liu Chih-pin

Deputy Commander of the ROC Navy
- In office 1 March 2015 – 31 May 2016
- Commander: Liu Chih-pin
- Preceded by: Hsu Pei-shan
- Succeeded by: Pan Chin-lung

6th Chief of Staff of the ROC Navy
- In office 1 August 2011 – 31 March 2012
- Commander: Tung Hsiang-lung
- Preceded by: Lee Hao
- Succeeded by: Hsu Pei-shan

Personal details
- Born: 20 June 1957 (age 69) Houli, Taichung, Taiwan
- Relatives: Vivian Huang (sister)
- Education: Republic of China Naval Academy (BS); National Defense University

Military service
- Branch/service: Republic of China Navy
- Years of service: 1979–2021
- Rank: Admiral
- Commands: Chief of the General Staff; Commander, Republic of China Navy; Deputy Commander of the Republic of China Navy; Chief of Staff of the Republic of China Navy; Office of Deputy Chief of the General Staff for Operations and Planning; Naval Fleet Command; Deputy Chief of the General Staff for Logistics; 168th Fleet; 256th Submarine Squadron; ROCS Hai Shih
- Battles/wars: Third Taiwan Strait Crisis

Huang Shu-kuang (Chinese: 黃曙光) is a Taiwanese admiral, who served as the Chief of the General Staff of the ROC Armed Forces from 2020 to 2021, after the death of General Shen Yi-ming. Prior to his appointment, Huang served as Commander of the Navy, Chief of Staff of the Republic of China Navy and as commander of the Naval Fleet Command.

== Early life and education ==
Huang is a graduate of the Republic of China Naval Academy class of 1979, and took courses in the National Defense University, such as submarine command courses, the Naval Command and Staff in 1992, and the Strategic Command Course in 2001 at the National Defense University.

== Military career ==
During the 1990s, Huang was the captain of the ROCS Hai Shih. In the mid-2000s, Huang was named commander of the 256th Submarine Squadron. During his term as Commander of the 256th Submarine Squadron, Huang oversaw the delivery of the Hai Lung-class submarines from the Netherlands. He next served as the ROCN's chief of staff. Huang then led the ROCN's Fleet Command. Soon after his appointment as commander of the Republic of China Navy, Huang, defense minister Feng Shih-kuan, and other military officers apologized for the killing of a dog on a military base. Soon after this incident, the Hsiung Feng III missile mishap occurred, followed by another round of apologies, during which he visited the home of Huang Wen-chung, the only victim of the incident, twice, first with Feng, and then with president Tsai Ing-wen. On the date of the incident, Huang was given a demerit. In April 2017, Tsai issued Huang Shu-kang a warning, because naval officers had agreed to a contract the previous July to acquire Raytheon Phalanx closed-in weapons systems before the Legislative Yuan passed a budget to purchase them.

In March 2017, Huang represented the ROCN in signing a memorandum of understanding with CSBC Corp., Taiwan and the National Chung-Shan Institute of Science and Technology for the latter two organizations to develop and build submarines for Taiwan's navy. Huang received two admonitions in November 2017, following legal action against Ching Fu Shipbuilding Co. chief executive officer Chien Liang-chien, who stood accused of fraud relating to a contract signed with the ROCN in October 2014. In October 2018, Huang was appointed convener of a task force formed to oversee development of an "Indigenous Defense Submarine." Huang announced his resignation from the submarine program in April 2024. Huang denied any "political factors" resulting in his resignation, but also drew attention to unfair attacks on him and the submarine program.

In August 2018, Huang apologized to the family of Huang Kuo-chang, who died in June 1995 while serving in the Republic of China Navy.

On 15 January 2020, Huang was appointed and promoted as the Chief of the General Staff, succeeding Adm. Liu Chih-pin, who had taken over on an acting basis after the death of the last Chief of the General Staff Gen. Shen Yi-ming in a helicopter crash.

=== Convener of the Indigenous Defense Submarine ===
In October 2018, Huang was named as the convener of the Indigenous Defense Submarine (IDS) program, which became later known as the Hai Kun-class submarine. As the convener of the program, Huang spearheaded the overall development of the submarines, which are set to conduct test runs in 2025. In April 2024, Huang announced his resignation from the submarine program. Huang denied any "political factors" resulting in his resignation, but also drew attention to unfair attacks on him and the submarine program.

After a month of negotiations between Huang with then-President Tsai Ing-wen and then-President elect Lai Ching-te, Huang's resignation was rejected and will remain his position as the convener of the IDS program. Both Tsai and Lai expressed confidence and faith in Huang to continue leading the project to its completion, which is said to be vital for Taiwan's defensive capabilities. In September 2025, Huang's resignation from the IDS program was approved by Lai.

== Awards ==
- Order of the Cloud and Banner
- Order of Loyalty and Diligence
- Order of the Sacred Tripod with Grand Cordon (awarded on 24 June 2021)
- Order of the Sacred Tripod with Red Grand Cordon (awarded on 17 January 2020)
- Order of Brilliant Star 2nd Class (Grand Cordon) (awarded on 15 May 2024)
- A-First Class, Medal of Victorious Garrison
- Medal of Naval Brilliance
- Medal of Naval Merits
- Medal of Naval Distinguished Service

== Personal life ==
Huang's ancestral home was in Xiangtan, Hunan. His family moved to Taiwan after the Chinese Civil War. His younger sister Huang Shan-shan has served as Taipei city councilor, deputy mayor, and on the Legislative Yuan.
