= Mei Chia-shu =

Taiwanese naval officer

Admiral Mei Chia-shu
- 梅家樹
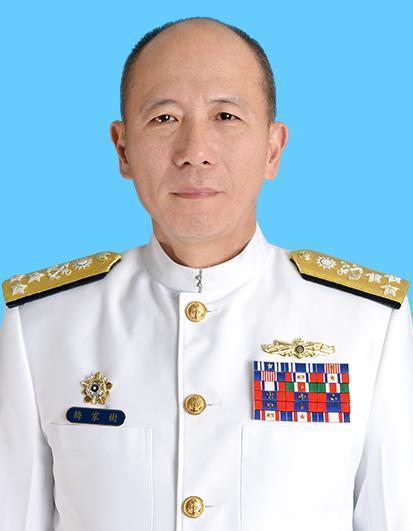
- Official portrait, 2023

30th Chief of the General Staff of the Armed Forces
- Incumbent
- Assumed office 1 May 2023
- President: Tsai Ing-wen; Lai Ching-te
- Preceded by: Chen Pao-yu

9th Commander of the Navy
- In office 16 June 2022 – 16 April 2023
- President: Tsai Ing-wen
- Preceded by: Liu Chih-pin
- Succeeded by: Tang Hua

Administrative Deputy Minister of National Defense
- In office 1 July 2018 – 31 March 2019
- Minister: Yen Teh-fa

Personal details
- Born: 1963 (age 63) Taiwan
- Education: Republic of China Naval Academy; National Defense University

Military service
- Allegiance: Republic of China
- Branch/service: Republic of China Navy
- Years of service: 1985–Present
- Rank: Admiral
- Commands: Chief of the General Staff; Commander, Republic of China Navy; Deputy Chief of the National Defense Staff; Deputy Minister of Defense; Director, Armaments Bureau; Director of the Naval Combat Systems Factory; 146th Fleet; 261st Squadron; ROCS Kee Lung; ROCS Pan Chao

Mei Chia-shu (Chinese: 梅家樹; born 1963) is a Republic of China Navy Admiral who serves as the Chief of the General Staff of the Republic of China Armed Forces since April 2023. Prior to his appointment, Mei served as the Commander of the Republic of China Navy from 2022 to 2023 and as Administrative Deputy Minister of National Defense of the Republic of China from 2018 to 2019.

== Early life and education ==
Mei was born in 1963. He entered the Republic of China Naval Academy and attended Chung-cheng Armed Forces Preparatory School at class 63 in 1981. In 1985, Mei graduated at the class 56 in Naval Academy. Mei also entered various courses at the National Defense University, where he attended the Command and Staff College Class in 2001 and War College Regular Class of 2006.

== Military career ==
After graduated from Naval Academy, he was commissioned as Ensign and held various positions in the Navy. Mei was eventually assigned to various ships in the navy and later skippered the ROCS Pan Chao and the ROCS Kee Lung. Mei was later moved up to lead the 261st Squadron and was later elevated to lead the 146th Fleet. Mei was promoted to Rear Admiral on January 1, 2009. In 2010, Mei was named commander of the Dunmu Detachment and was later named as Director of the Naval Combat Systems Factory.

Mei was later named as Assistant Vice Chief of the Staff of the Joint Staff and as Director of the Political Affairs Office at the Ministry of National Defense. In 2016, Mei was promoted to the rank of Vice Admiral and from 2016 to 2017, Mei later served as the Chief of the Navy Staff, before serving as the Director of the Armaments Bureau from January 1, 2017 to June 30, 2018. From July 1, 2018 to March 31, 2019, Mei served as the Deputy Minister of Defense at the Ministry of National Defense. Mei later served as the Vice Commander of the Navy from April 1, 2019 to March 31, 2021. During his term as Vice Commander of the Navy, Mei took responsibility for the COVID-19 outbreak on the Dunmu Fleet, which was returning to Taiwan after being deployed to Palau for a goodwill visit, and left 21 sailors positive to the virus. Mei was credited afterwards for his crisis management during the outbreak, despite criticisms regarding the pictures of sailors not wearing face masks being released on social media websites. Other related matters Mei handled include the accidental missile launch in 2016, and during the 2017 animal abuse case, which involved three Marine Corps.

Mei was later named as the Deputy Chief of the Defense Staff from April 1, 2021 to June 30, 2021 and later served as the Executive Deputy Chief of Staff of the Defense Staff from July 1, 2021 to June 15, 2022. Mei was named as the Commander, Republic of China Navy on June 16, 2022 and replaced Admiral Liu Chih-pin.

In April 2023, Mei Chia-shu was appointed by President Tsai Ing-wen as Chief of the General Staff, filling a post left vacant by the retirement of General Chen Pao-yu. Mei's appointment comes amidst the rising tensions with China, which highlights the importance of maritime defense following potential invasion threats from the People's Liberation Army and the development of Taiwan's domestically-made submarine, the Hai Kun-class submarine

== Awards in military service ==
- Order of the Sacred Tripod with Special Cravat (awarded on April 6, 2021)
- Order of the Cloud and Banner with Grand Cordon (awarded on May 15, 2024)
- Order of the Cloud and Banner with Yellow Grand Cordon (awarded on June 16, 2022)
- Order of Loyalty and Diligence
- Medal of the Armed Forces, A-First Class (awarded in April 2019)
- Medal of Naval Brilliance
- Medal of Naval Achievement
- Medal of Naval Merit
- Medal of Naval Distinguished Service
- Medal of Naval Disposition
