= General Chang =

General Chang may refer to:

- Chang Che-ping (born 1958), general of the Republic of China Air Force
- Chang Do-yong (1923–2012), general of the Republic of Korea Army, nominal leader of South Korea's May 16 coup
- Chang Fa-kuei (1896–1980), general of the Republic of China
- Chang Guan-chung (born 1959), general of the Republic of China Army
- Chang Hai-peng (1867–1949), general of the Republic of China who defected to Manchukuo
- Chang Sung-hwan (1920–2015), lieutenant general of the Republic of Korea Air Force
- Chang Tsung-chang (1881–1932), Shandong-based general of the Fengtian Clique during the early Republic of China era
- Chang Yinhuai (died 1929), Heilongjiang-based general of the Fengtian Clique during the early Republic of China era
- Chang Yuchun (1330–1369), general of the Ming Dynasty
- Chang (Star Trek), primary antagonist in the 1991 American film Star Trek VI
