= Chang Che-ping =

Taiwanese general

- 張哲平
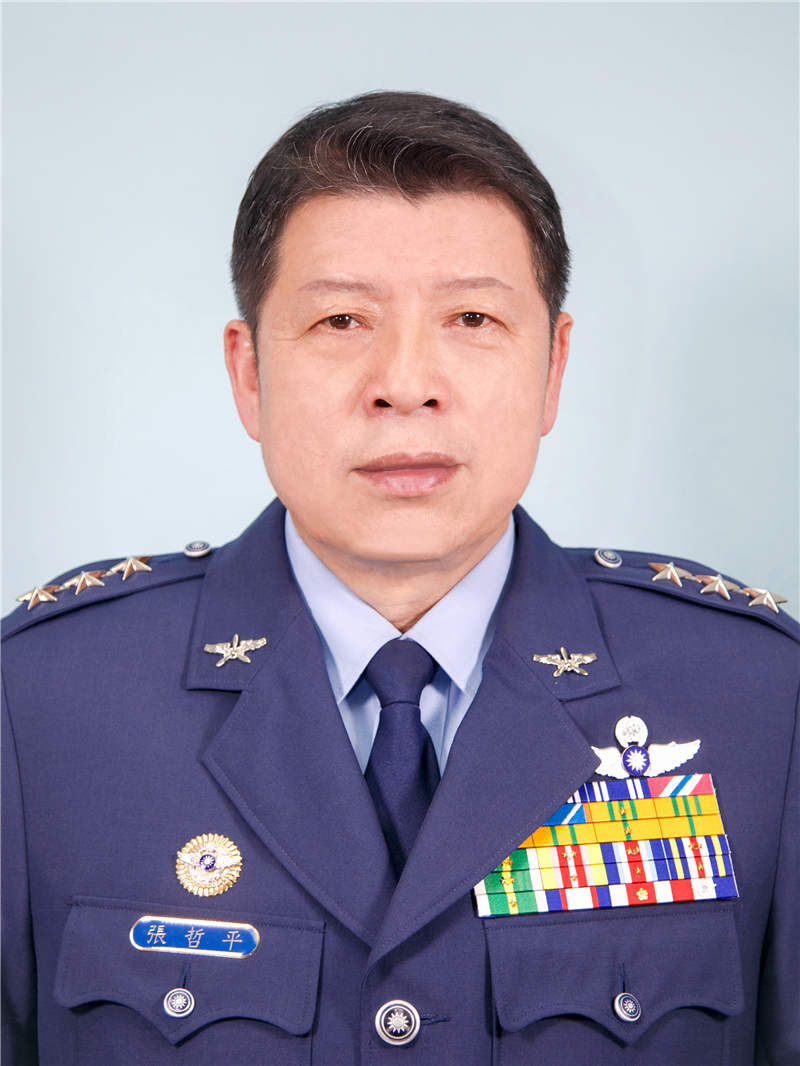

12th President of National Defense University
- In office 1 July 2021 – 16 June 2022
- Preceded by: Wang Shin-lung
- Succeeded by: Liu Chih-pin

13th Deputy Minister (Policy) of National Defense of the Republic of China
- In office 1 July 2019 – 30 June 2021
- Minister: Chiu Kuo-cheng; Yen Teh-fa
- Preceded by: Shen Yi-ming
- Succeeded by: Po Hung-hui

7th Commander of the Republic of China Air Force
- In office 1 March 2018 – 30 June 2019
- Preceded by: Shen Yi-ming
- Succeeded by: Hsiung Hou-chi

Deputy Commander of the Republic of China Air Force
- In office 1 December 2016 – 28 February 2018
- Preceded by: Liu Shou-jen
- Succeeded by: Hsiung Hou-chi

Personal details
- Born: December 1958 (age 67) Taoyuan, Taiwan
- Education: Republic of China Air Force Academy; National Defense University

Military service
- Allegiance: Republic of China
- Branch/service: Republic of China Air Force
- Years of service: 1982–
- Rank: General
- Unit: Commanding General of the Air Force

Chinese name
- Traditional Chinese: 張哲平
- Simplified Chinese: 张哲平
Transcriptions
Standard Mandarin
- Hanyu Pinyin: Zhāng Zhépíng

Chang Che-ping (born December 1958) is a Taiwanese military officer.

== Career ==
Chang was born in Taoyuan, Taiwan. His parents move to Taiwan from Mainland China. His ancestral home from Lingling, Hunan. He completed his studies at the Republic of China Air Force Academy in 1982, later graduating from National Defense University in 1993. He led the 499th Tactical Fighter Wing in Hsinchu, and was appointed to lead the Air Force Combatant Command in 2015. Chang subsequently served as deputy commander of the Republic of China Air Force until his promotion to commander of the air force took effect on 1 March 2018. On 1 July 2019, Chang succeeded Shen Yi-ming as vice minister of defense, and was placed in charge of policy. Chang left his vice ministerial position to replace Wang Shin-lung as president of National Defense University on 1 July 2021.

== Espionage probe ==
On 28 July 2021, Mirror Media reported that Taiwanese prosecutors were investigating Chang over his contact with a Chinese spy ring. The probe continued into August without Chang being formally named a suspect. He was later renamed as a witness. In 2022, Taipei District Prosecutors Office charged retired major general Chien and retired lieutenant colonel Wei for developing a spy network for China, accusing the duo of unsuccessfully trying to recruit Chang.
