= Military ranks of China =

Military ranks of China can refer to:

== Military ranks of the People's Republic of China ==
- Ranks of the People's Liberation Army Ground Force
- Ranks of the People's Liberation Army Navy
- Ranks of the People's Liberation Army Air Force

== Military ranks of the Republic of China ==
- Republic of China Armed Forces rank insignia
