= Commander of the Navy (Taiwan) =

Commander of the Republic of China Navy

Commander of the Republic of China Navy
- 中華民國海軍司令
- Republic of China Navy badge

- Flag for the Commander of the Navy

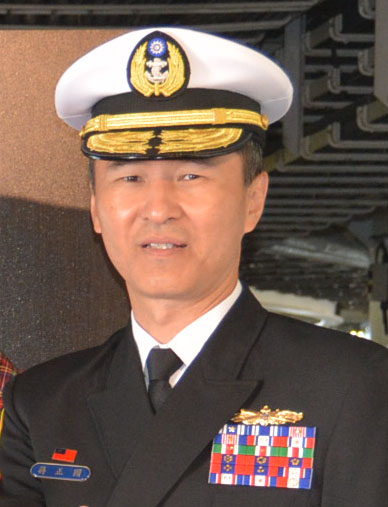
- Incumbent; Admiral Chiang Cheng-kuo since 1 December 2025
- Republic of China Navy
- Reports to: Chief of the General Staff
- Formation: 3 January 1912
- First holder: Huang Zhongying

The Commander of the Republic of China Navy (Chinese: 中華民國海軍司令; pinyin: Zhōnghuá Mínguó Hǎijūn Sīlìng) is the highest-ranking military officer and commander of the Republic of China Navy in Taiwan. The current Commander is Admiral Chiang Cheng-kuo.

== List ==
=== Minister of the Navy ===
No.	Portrait	Commander	Took office	Left office	Time in office	Ref.
1	Huang Zhongying [zh]	Admiral; Huang Zhongying (born 1869)	3 January 1912	29 March 1912	86 days	–
2	Liu Guanxiong	Admiral; Liu Guanxiong (1861–1927)	30 March 1912	29 June 1916	4 years, 91 days	–
3	Cheng Biguang	Admiral; Cheng Biguang (1861–1918)	30 June 1916	24 June 1917	359 days	–
4	Sa Zhenbing	Admiral; Sa Zhenbing (1859–1952)	24 June 1917	2 July 1917	8 days	–
5	Liu Guanxiong	Admiral; Liu Guanxiong (1861–1927)	15 July 1917	3 December 1919	2 years, 141 days	–
6	Sa Zhenbing	Admiral; Sa Zhenbing (1859–1952)	3 December 1919	14 May 1921	1 year, 162 days	–
7	Li Dingxin [zh]	Admiral; Li Dingxin (1861–1930)	14 May 1921	31 October 1924	3 years, 170 days	–
8	Lin Jianzhang [zh]	Admiral; Lin Jianzhang (1874–1940)	November 1924	31 December 1925	–	–
9	Du Xigui	Admiral; Du Xigui (1861–1930)	31 December 1925	June 1927	–	–
10	Yang Shuzhuang [zh]	Admiral; Yang Shuzhuang (1882–1934)	12 April 1929	1 January 1932	2 years, 264 days	–
11	Chen Shaokuan	Admiral; Chen Shaokuan (1889–1969)	1 January 1932	31 January 1938	3 years, 170 days	–

=== Commander-in-Chief of the Navy ===
No.	Portrait	Commander	Took office	Left office	Time in office	Ref.
1	Chen Shaokuan	Admiral; Chen Shaokuan (1889–1969)	31 January 1938	1 July 1946	14 years, 181 days	–
2	Chen Cheng	General; Chen Cheng (1898–1965)	1 July 1946	25 August 1948	2 years, 55 days	–
3	Gui Yongqing [zh]	General; Gui Yongqing (1901–1954)	25 August 1948	15 April 1952	3 years, 234 days	–
4	Ma Chi-chuang [zh]	Admiral; Ma Chi-chuang (1912–1998)	16 April 1952	1 July 1954	2 years, 76 days	–
5	Liang Xuzhao [zh]	Admiral; Liang Xuzhao (1903–1978)	1 July 1954	1 February 1959	4 years, 215 days	–
6	Li Yuxi [zh]	Admiral; Li Yuxi (1914–2003)	1 February 1959	25 January 1965	5 years, 359 days	–
7	Liu Guangkai [zh]	Admiral; Liu Guangkai (1914–1991)	25 January 1965	16 August 1965	203 days	–
8	Feng Qicong [zh]	Admiral; Feng Qicong (1914–1994)	16 August 1965	1 July 1970	4 years, 319 days	–
9	Song Changzhi [zh]	Admiral; Song Changzhi (1916–2002)	1 July 1970	1 July 1976	6 years, 0 days	–
10	Zou Jian [zh]	Admiral; Zou Jian (1921–2004)	2 July 1976	15 May 1983	6 years, 317 days	–
11	Liu Ho-chien	Admiral; Liu Ho-chien (1926–2023)	16 May 1983	1 June 1988	5 years, 16 days	–
12	Ye Changtong	Admiral; Ye Changtong	1 June 1988	1 May 1992	3 years, 335 days	–
13	Chuang Ming-yao	Admiral; Chuang Ming-yao (1929–2002)	1 May 1992	16 April 1994	1 year, 350 days	–
14	Gu Chonglian	Admiral; Gu Chonglian (1931–2007)	16 April 1994	16 April 1997	3 years, 0 days	–
15	Wu Shih-wen	Admiral; Wu Shih-wen (born 1934)	16 April 1997	1 February 1999	1 year, 291 days	–
16	Lee Jye	Admiral; Lee Jye (born 1940)	1 February 1999	1 February 2002	3 years, 0 days	–
17	Miao Yongqing	Admiral; Miao Yongqing	1 February 2002	1 February 2005	3 years, 0 days	–
18	Chen Bangzhi [zh]	Admiral; Chen Bangzhi (born 1942)	1 February 2005	16 February 2006	1 year, 15 days	–
19	Lin Chen-yi	Senior Admiral; Lin Chen-yi (born 1945)	16 February 2006	17 February 2006	0 days	–

=== Commander of the Navy ===
No.	Portrait	Commander	Took office	Left office	Time in office	Ref.
1	Lin Chen-yi	Senior Admiral; Lin Chen-yi (born 1945)	17 February 2006	21 May 2007	1 year, 93 days	–
2	Wang Li-shen [zh]	Admiral; Wang Li-shen (born 1946)	21 May 2007	20 May 2009	1 year, 364 days	–
3	Kao Kuang-chi	Admiral; Kao Kuang-chi (born 1950)	21 May 2009	16 May 2011	1 year, 360 days	–
4	Tung Hsiang-lung	Admiral; Tung Hsiang-lung (born 1952)	16 May 2011	31 July 2013	2 years, 76 days	
5	Chen Yeong-kang	Admiral; Chen Yeong-kang (born 1951)	1 August 2013	30 January 2015	1 year, 182 days	
6	Lee Hsi-ming	Admiral; Lee Hsi-ming (born 1955)	30 January 2015	31 May 2016	1 year, 122 days	
7	Huang Shu-kuang	Admiral; Huang Shu-kuang (born 1957)	1 June 2016	15 January 2020	3 years, 228 days	
8	Liu Chih-pin	Admiral; Liu Chih-pin (born 1962)	15 January 2020	15 June 2022	2 years, 151 days	–
9	Mei Chia-shu	Admiral; Mei Chia-shu (born 1963)	16 June 2022	30 April 2023	318 days	–
10	Tang Hua(Navy)	Admiral; Tang Hua(Navy) (born 1964)	1 May 2023	30 November 2025	2 years, 213 days	–
11	Chiang Cheng-Kuo	Admiral; Chiang Cheng-Kuo (born 1966)	1 December 2025	Incumbent	280 days	
