= ROCS Di Hua =

Kang Ding class frigate

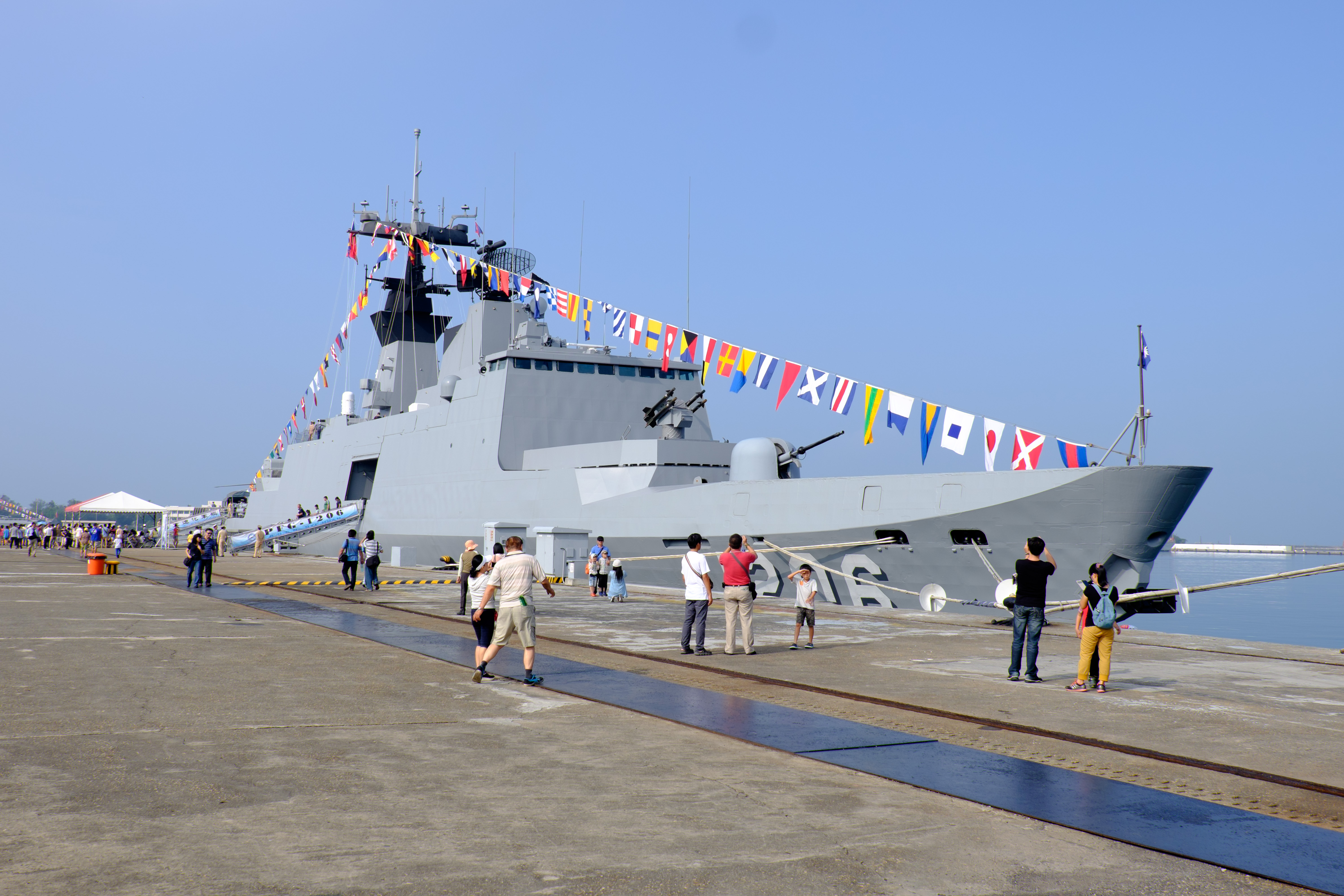
- ROCS Di Hua at Zuoying Naval Base on 24 October 2015

History

Taiwan
- Name: Di Hua; (迪化)
- Namesake: Di Hua
- Builder: DCNS, Lorient
- Laid down: 1 July 1995
- Launched: 27 November 1995
- Acquired: 1997
- Commissioned: 14 August 1997
- Home port: Zuoying
- Identification: Pennant number: PFG-1206
- Status: Active

General characteristics
- Class & type: Kang Ding-class frigate
- Displacement: 3,200 tonnes, 3,800 tonnes fully loaded
- Length: 125 m (410 ft)
- Beam: 15.4 m (51 ft)
- Draught: 4.1 m (13 ft)
- Propulsion: 4 diesel SEMT Pielstick 12PA6V280 STC2, 21,000 hp (16,000 kW)
- Speed: 25 kn (46 km/h; 29 mph)
- Range: 4,000 nmi (7,400 km; 4,600 mi) at 15 kn (28 km/h; 17 mph); 9,000 nmi (17,000 km; 10,000 mi) at 12 kn (22 km/h; 14 mph)
- Endurance: 50 days of food
- Boats & landing craft carried: 2 × ETN boats
- Capacity: 350 tonnes of fuel, 80 m³ of kerosene, 60 tonnes of potable water
- Complement: 12 officers; 68 petty officers; 61 men
- Sensors & processing systems: 1 × CastorII fire control radar; 1 x DRBV-26D Jupiter-II two-dimensional air search radar; 1 x Poseidon Triton G search radar; Najir photoelectric director; Alose Sonar System
- Armament: Anti-ship; 8 × Hsiung Feng II anti-ship missiles; 1 x MIM-72 Chaparral; 2 x Mark 32 Surface Vessel Torpedo Tubes; Guns; 1 × OTO Melara 76 mm; 2 × Bofors 40 mm L70 guns; CIWS; 1 × Phalanx CIWS
- Armour: On sensitive areas (munition magazine and control centre)
- Aircraft carried: 1 × Sikorsky S-70C (M)
- Aviation facilities: Hangar and helipad

ROCS Di Hua (PFG-1206) (Chinese: 迪化; lit. 'Ti Hwa') is a Kang Ding-class frigate of the Republic of China Navy.

== Development and design ==
As the ROC (Taiwan)'s defensive stance is aimed towards the Taiwan Strait, the ROC Navy is constantly seeking to upgrade its anti-submarine warfare capabilities. The US$1.75 billion agreement with France in the early 1990s was an example of this procurement strategy, the six ships are configured for both ASW and surface attack. The Exocet was replaced by Taiwan-developed Hsiung Feng II anti-ship missile and the AAW weapon is the Sea Chaparral. The main gun is an Oto Melara 76 mm/62 mk 75 gun, similar to its Singaporean counterparts, the Formidable-class frigates. Some problems in the integration of Taiwanese and French systems had been reported. The frigate carries a single Sikorsky S-70C(M)-1/2 ASW helicopter.

The Sea Chaparral SAM system is considered inadequate for defense against aircraft and anti-ship missiles, so the ROC (Taiwan) Navy plans to upgrade its air-defense capabilities with the indigenous TC-2N in 2020. The missiles will be quad-packed in a vertical launch system for future ROCN surface combatants, but a less-risky alternative arrangement of above-deck, fixed oblique launchers is seen as more likely for upgrading these French-built frigates.

== Construction and career ==
Di Hua was launched on 27 November 1995 at the DCNS in Lorient. Commissioned on 14 August 1997.

On 13 July 2016, in response to the South China Sea arbitration case, the then President of the Republic of China, Tsai Ing-wen, was accompanied by Defense Minister Feng Shikuan and Navy Commander Huang Shuguang to inspect Di Hua at about 9 a.m., leaving Zuoying Naval Base at 11 a.m. and heading for the South China Sea Carry out patrol task.

== Gallery ==
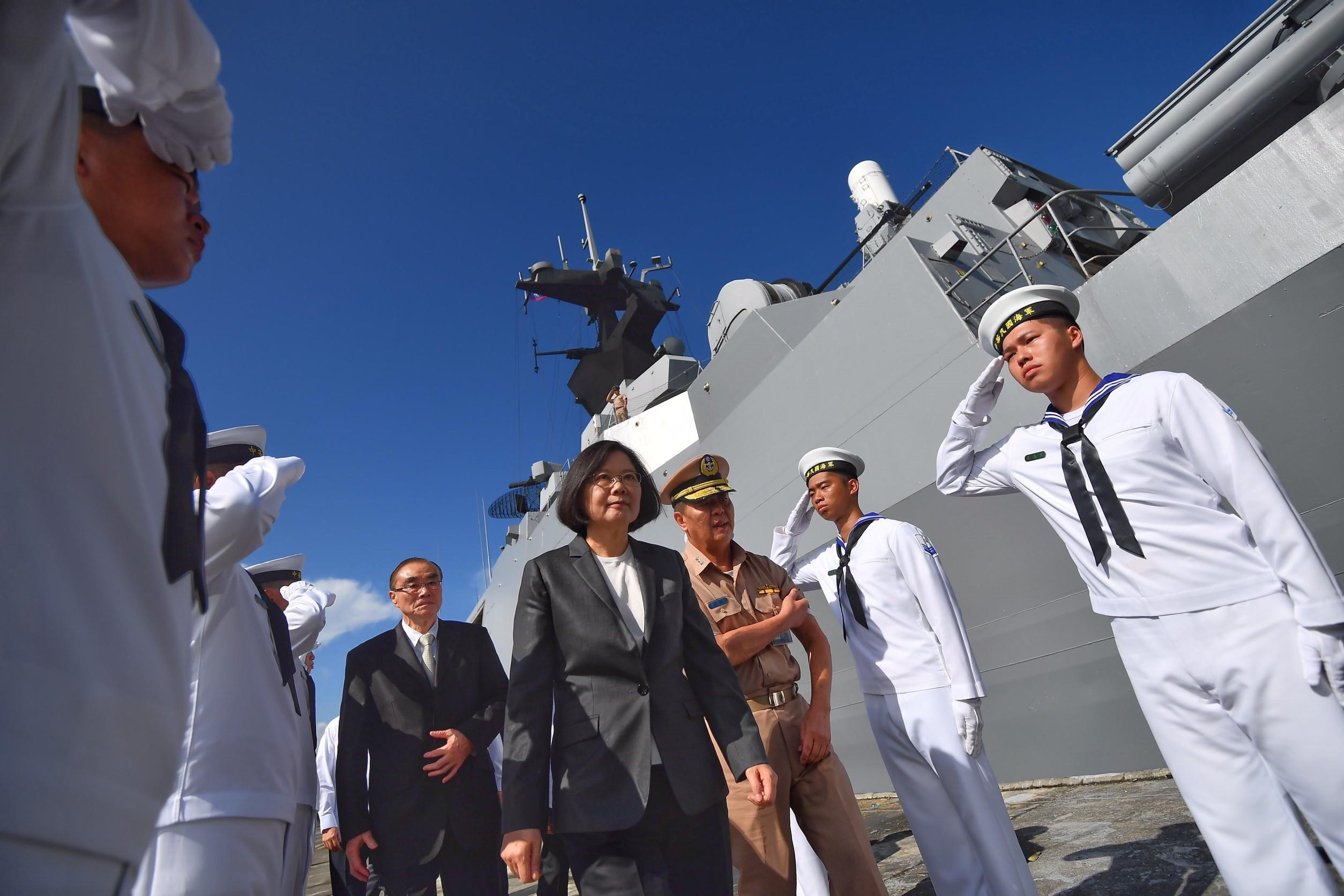
Tsai Ing-wen and Huang Shu-kuang inspects Di Hua on 12 July 2015.

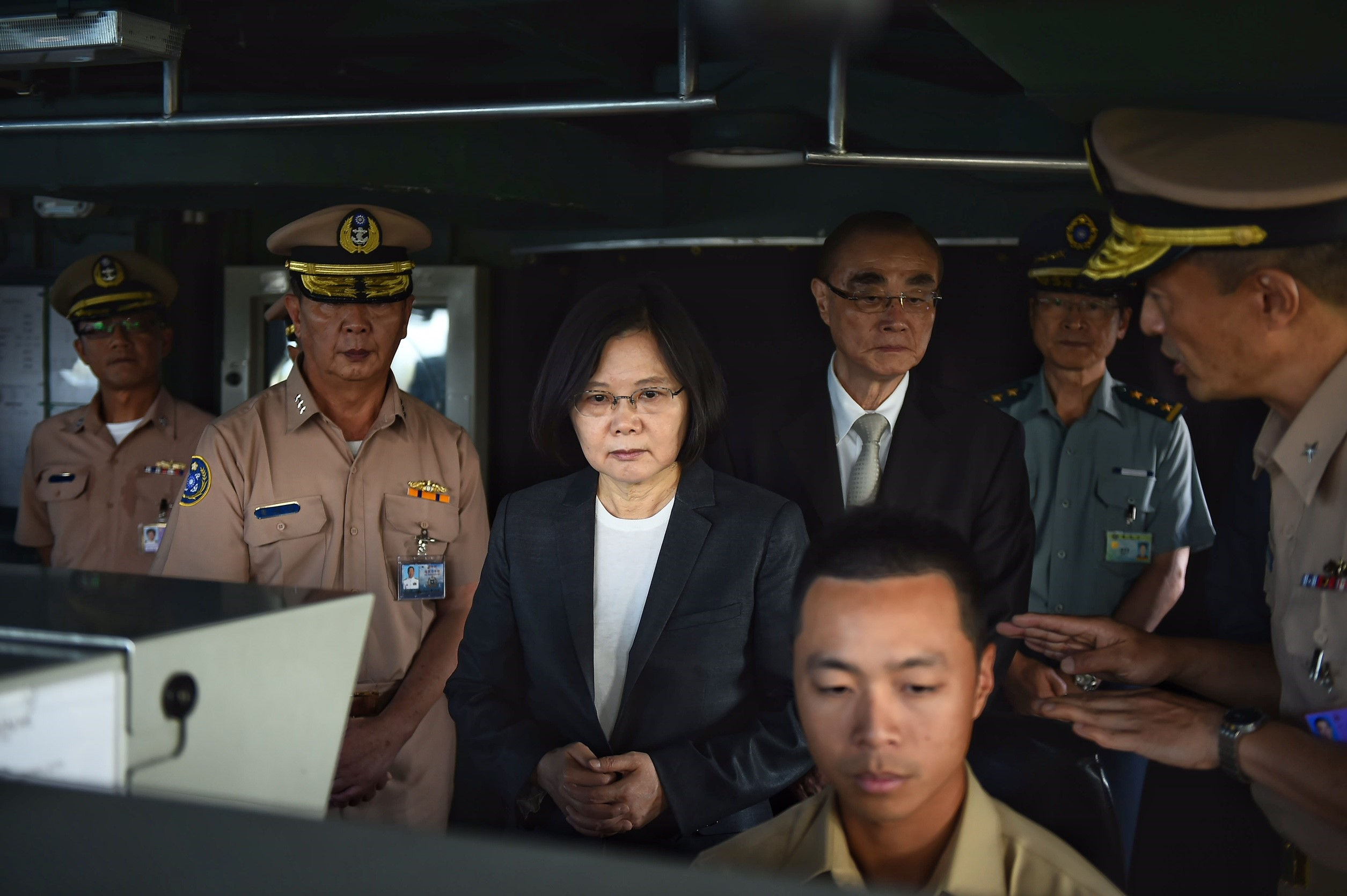
Tsai Ing-wen and Huang Shu-kuang inspects Di Hua on 12 July 2015.

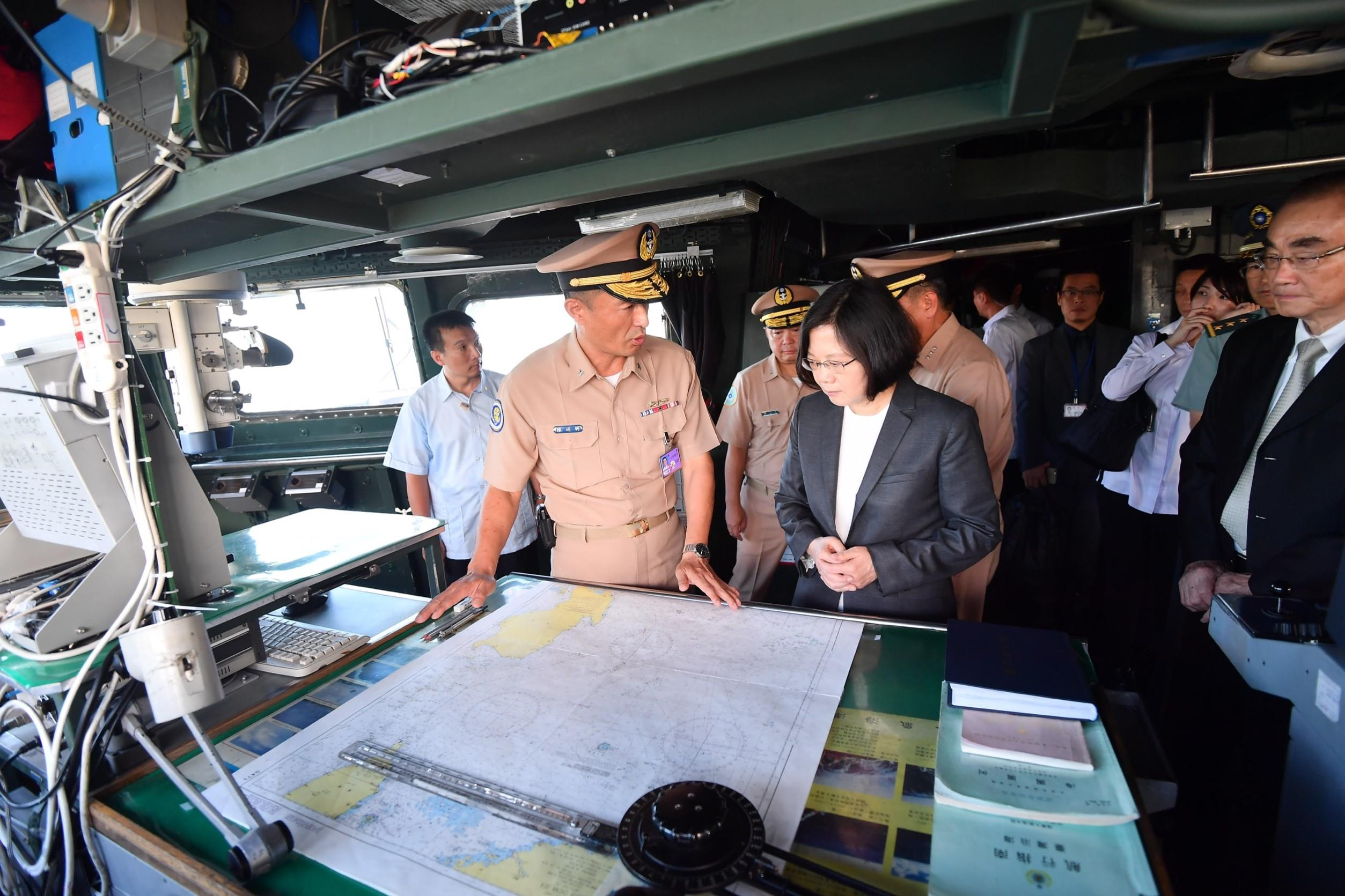
Tsai Ing-wen and Huang Shu-kuang inspects Di Hua on 12 July 2015.

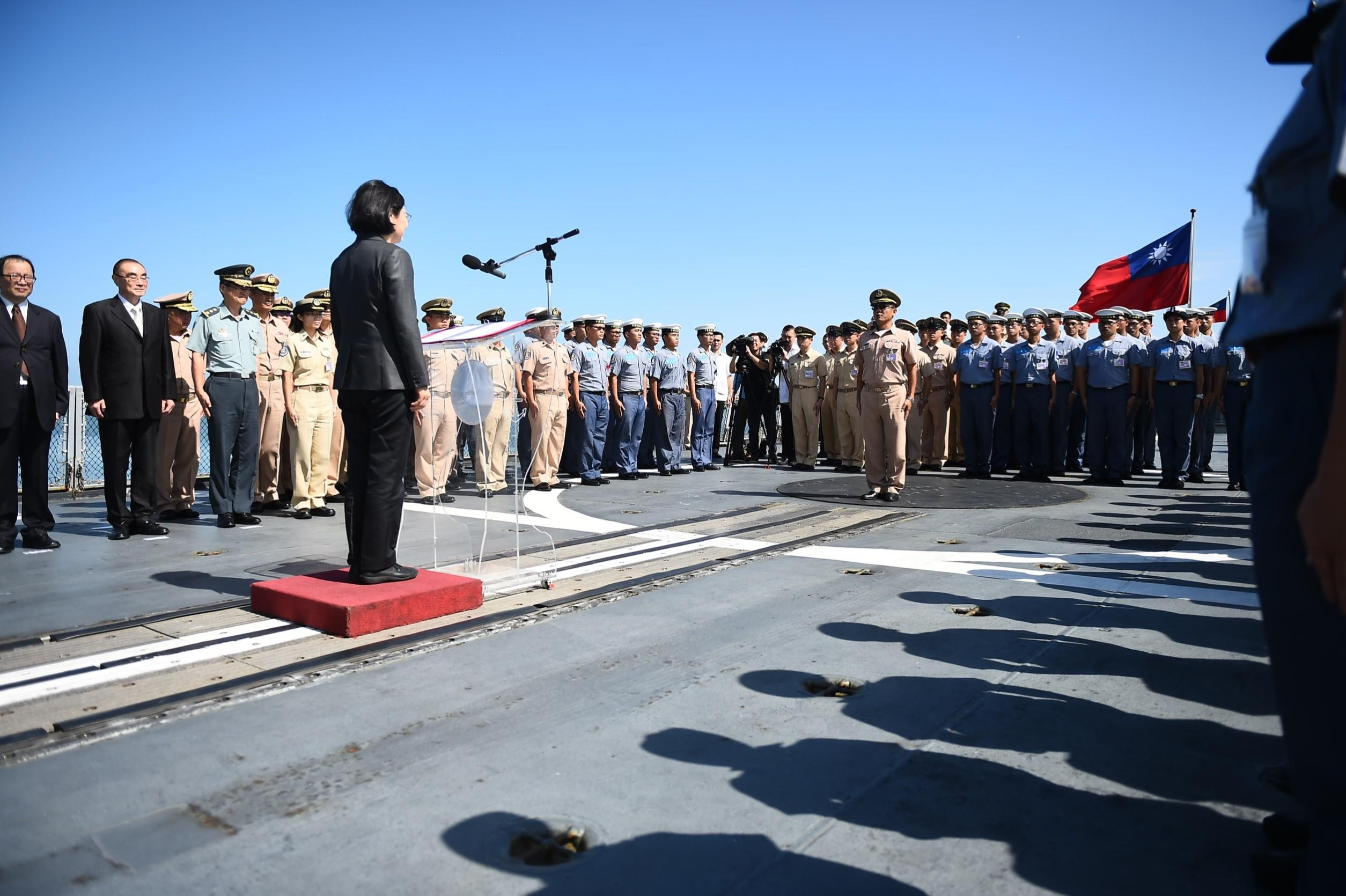
Tsai Ing-wen gives a speech aboard Di Hua on 12 July 2015.

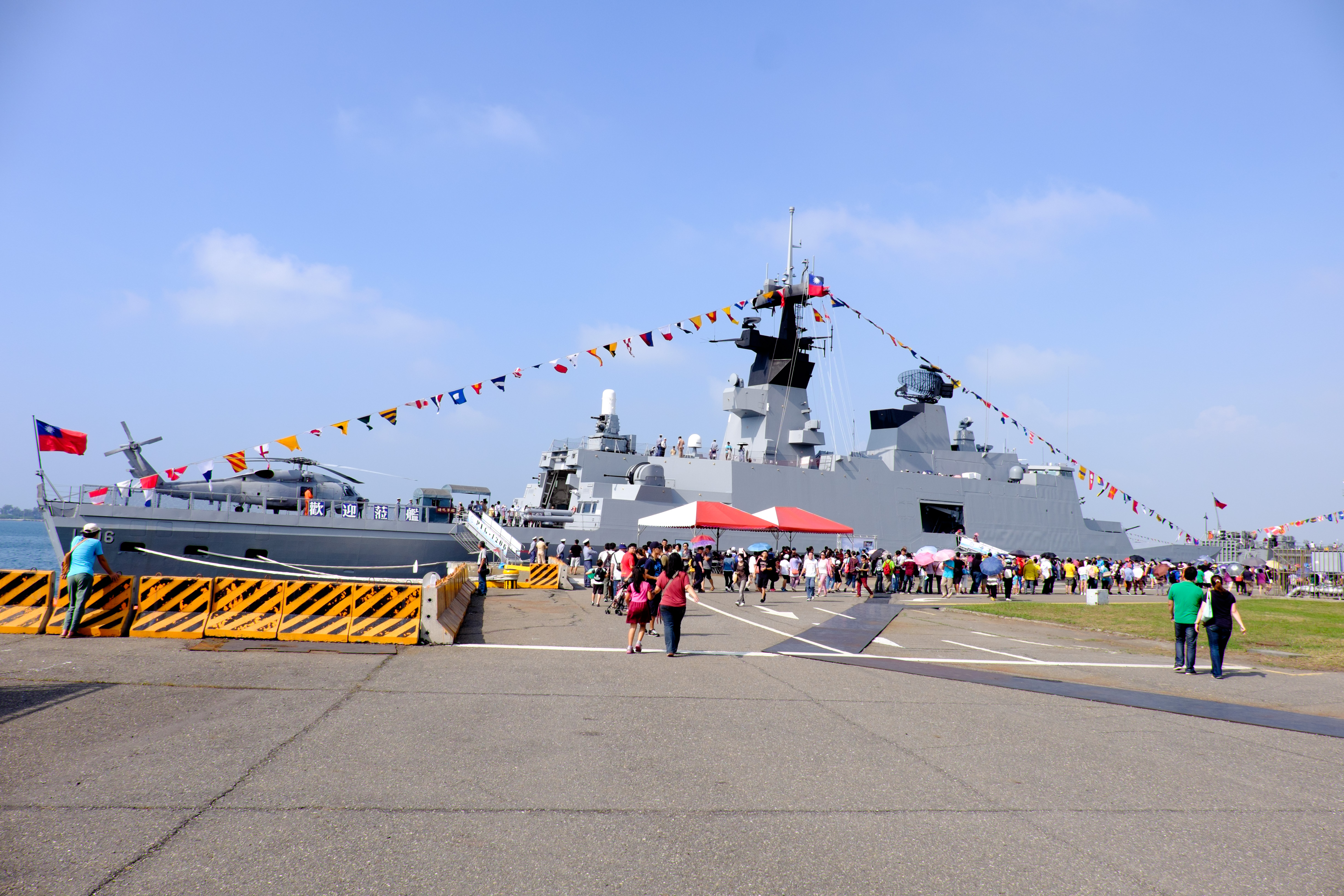
Di Hua at Zuoying Naval Base on 24 October 2015.

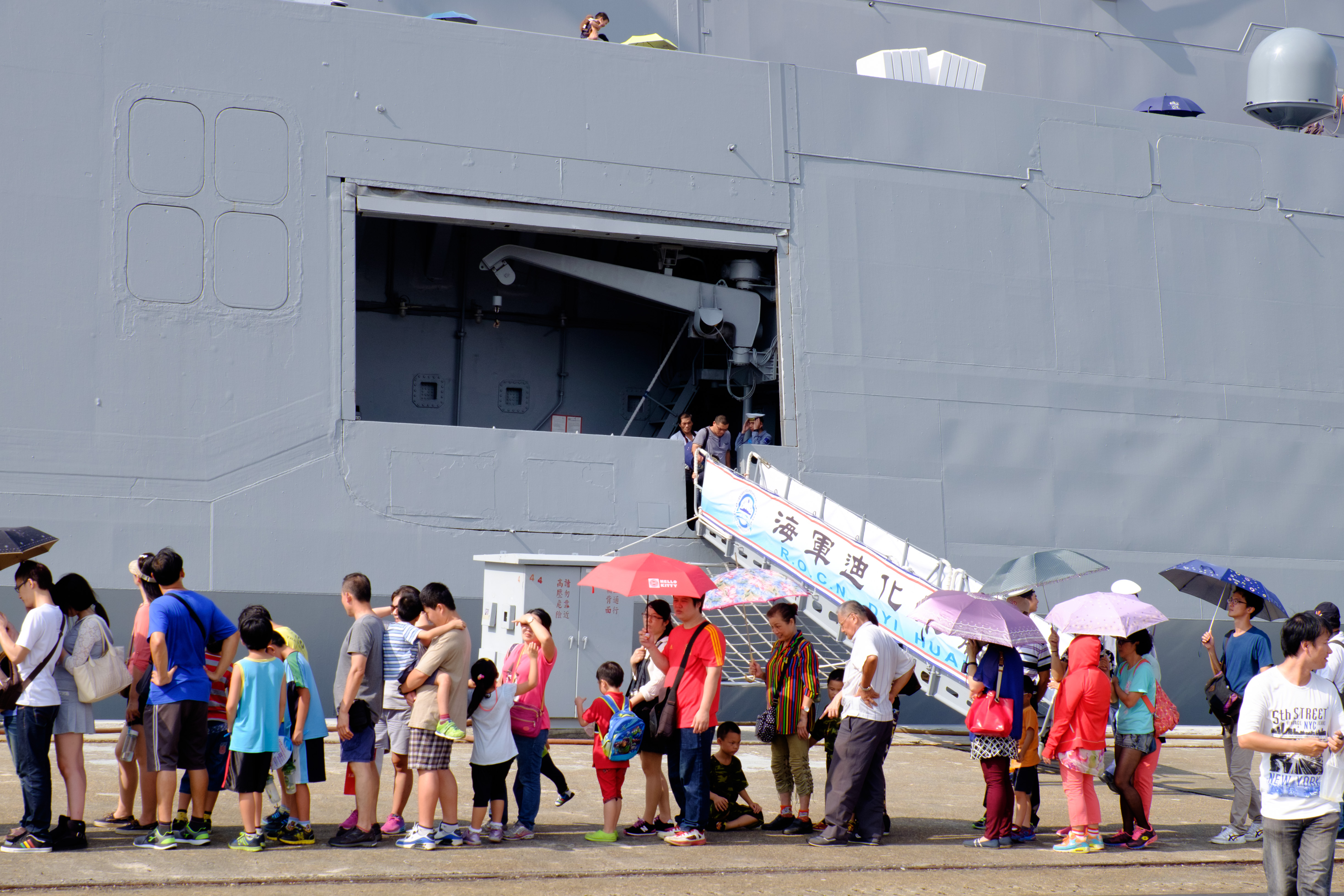
Di Hua at Zuoying Naval Base on 24 October 2015.
