= Chen Hsing-ling =

Taiwanese air force general officer and pilot (1924–2017)

- 陳燊齡
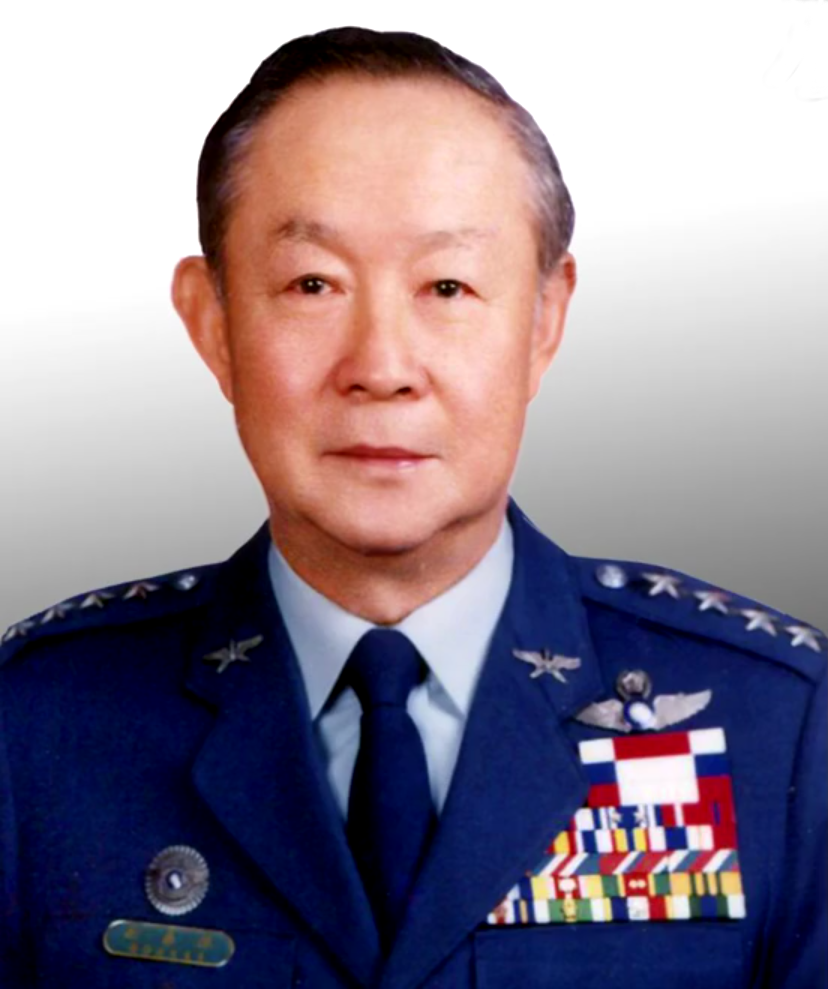

Chief of the General Staff of the Republic of China
- In office 5 December 1989 – 4 December 1991
- Preceded by: Hau Pei-tsun
- Succeeded by: Liu Ho-chien

Personal details
- Born: 9 August 1924 Peking, China
- Died: 9 February 2017 (aged 92) Taipei, Taiwan

Military service
- Branch/service: Republic of China Air Force
- Battles/wars: Second Sino-Japanese War; Chinese Civil War

Chen Hsing-ling (Chinese: 陳燊齡; pinyin: Chén Shēnlíng; 1924 – 9 February 2017) was a Taiwanese air force general officer and pilot. He served as the Commander in Chief of the Republic of China Air Force in Taiwan from 1986 to 1989 and the Chief of General Staff of the Republic of China Armed Forces from 1989 until 1991.

Born in Beijing, Republic of China in 1924, Chen Hsing-ling served as a fighter pilot during the Second Sino-Japanese War (1937–1945). He then fought for ROC military during the Chinese Civil War from 1946 to 1949. In the 1950s, Chen was selected as one of the first Taiwanese (ROC) military pilots to travel to the United States to receive Republic F-84 flight training.

Chen Hsing-ling died in Taipei on 9 February 2017, at the age of 92.
