= Lin Chen-yi =

Taiwanese admiral (born 1945)

- 林鎮夷
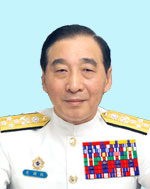

21st Chief of the General Staff of the Republic of China Armed Forces
- In office 5 February 2009 – 15 January 2013
- Preceded by: Huo Shou-yeh
- Succeeded by: Yen Ming

Deputy Minister of National Defense of the Republic of China
- Preceded by: Chu Kai-sheng
- Succeeded by: Chao Shih-chang

1st Commander of the Republic of China Navy
- In office 17 February 2006 – 21 May 2007
- Preceded by: himself (as Commander-in-Chief)
- Succeeded by: Wang Li-sheng

18th Commander-in-Chief of the Republic of China Navy
- In office 16 February 2006 – 17 February 2006
- Preceded by: Chen Pang-chi
- Succeeded by: himself (as Commander)

Personal details
- Born: 1945 (age 80–81) Qingzhen, Guizhou, Republic of China
- Education: Republic of China Naval Academy
- Awards: Order of Blue Sky and White Sun

Military service
- Allegiance: Republic of China
- Branch/service: Republic of China Navy
- Years of service: 1969–present
- Rank: Senior Admiral
- Battles/wars: Third Taiwan Strait Crisis

Lin Chen-yi (traditional Chinese: 林鎮夷; simplified Chinese: 林镇夷; pinyin: Lín Zhènyí; born 1945) is an admiral of the Republic of China Navy in Taiwan. He was the Chief of the General Staff of the Republic of China Armed Forces between 2009 and 2013, and also the last senior admiral/general in the military after the new law that allows promotion to senior general/admiral rank only in wartime.

== See also ==
- Executive Yuan
- Ministry of National Defense of the Republic of China
- Republic of China Armed Forces rank insignia
