= Liu Chih-pin =

Taiwan chief of the naval staff

Admiral Liu Chih-pin
- 劉志斌
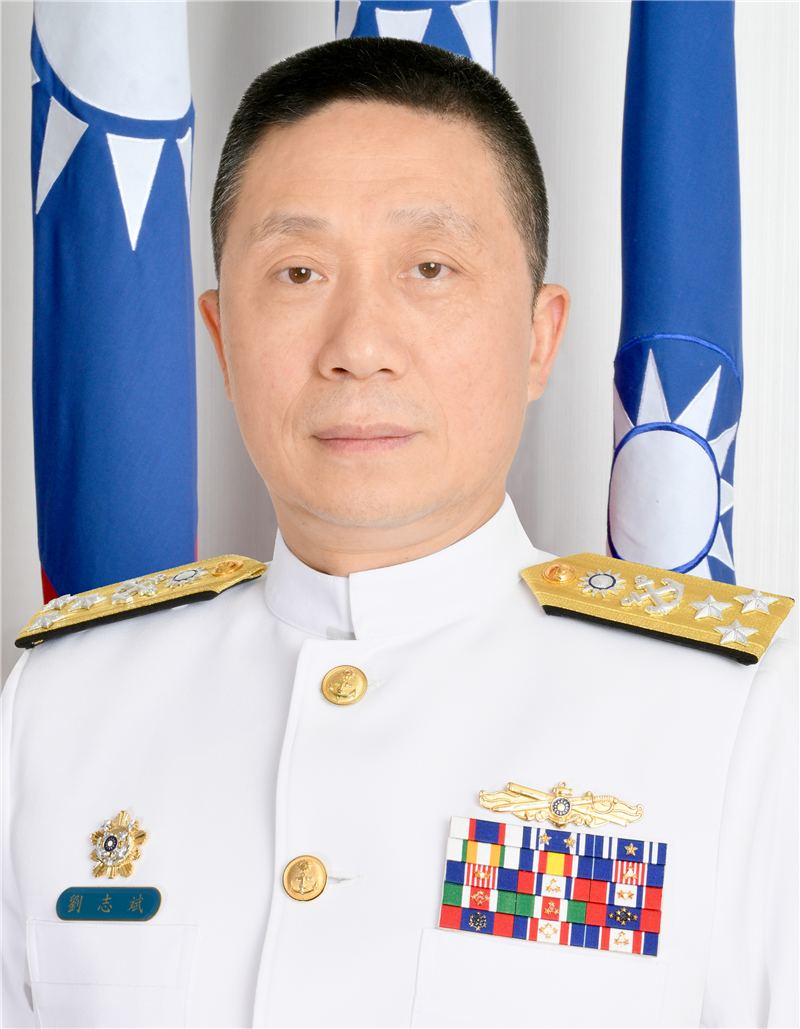

8th Commander of the Republic of China Navy
- In office 16 January 2020 – 15 June 2022
- Preceded by: Huang Shu-kuang
- Succeeded by: Mei Chia-shu

Acting Chief of the General Staff of the Republic of China Armed Forces
- In office 2 January 2020 – 15 January 2020
- Preceded by: Shen Yi-ming
- Succeeded by: Huang Shu-kuang

Deputy Commander of the Republic of China Navy
- In office 1 December 2018 – 31 March 2019
- Preceded by: Hsiao Wei-min
- Succeeded by: Mei Chia-shu

9th Chief of Staff of the Republic of China Navy
- In office 1 January 2016 – 19 May 2016
- Deputy: Zhang Bei-hai
- Preceded by: Hsiao Wei-min
- Succeeded by: Mei Chia-shu

Personal details
- Born: 1962 (age 63–64) Taiwan
- Education: Republic of China Naval Academy

Military service
- Allegiance: Republic of China
- Branch/service: Republic of China Navy
- Years of service: 1984–present
- Rank: Admiral
- Commands: Chief of the General Staff (acting); Commander, Republic of China Navy; Office of Deputy Chief of the General Staff for Operations and Planning; Chief of Staff, Republic of China Navy; Naval Fleets Command; 124th Flotilla

Liu Chih-Pin (Chinese: 劉志斌) is a Taiwanese admiral who is the president of the National Defense University. He previously served as the Chief of the Naval Staff of the Republic of China Navy. He previously served as deputy Chief of the General Staff.

From 2 January to 15 January 2020, he served as acting Chief of the General Staff due to the death of then Chief of the General Staff Shen Yi-ming.

Prior to being deputy Chief of the General Staff, he was Navy Chief of Staff and also deputy commander of the navy. He graduated from ROC Naval Academy, National Defense University, Naval Command and Staff College and Taiwan War College.

He was also head of The Navy's 124th Flotilla, Chief of Staff of the Navy Fleet Command and Deputy Chief of Naval Staff.
