= Chen Shaokuan =

Chinese Fleet Admiral (1889–1969)

Fleet Admiral Chen Shaokuan DSO
- 陳紹寬
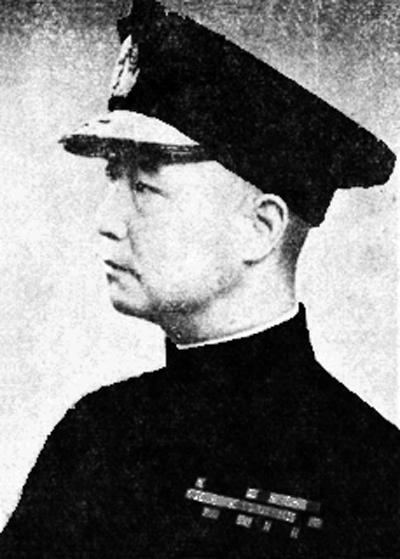

Chief of Navy of the Republic of China Navy
- In office 1 January 1938 – 26 December 1945

Minister of Navy of the Republic of China
- In office 1932–1938
- Preceded by: Yang Shuzhuang

Member of the National People's Congress of the People's Republic of China
- In office September 1954 – 30 July 1969

Personal details
- Born: 7 October 1889 Fujian, Qing Dynasty
- Died: 30 July 1969 (aged 79) Fuzhou, Fujian, China

Military service
- Allegiance: Qing dynasty (to 1911); Republic of China; China
- Branch/service: Imperial Chinese Navy; Republic of China Navy
- Rank: Fleet Admiral
- Battles/wars: World War I Second Sino-Japanese War; World War II

Chen Shaokuan DSO (simplified Chinese: 陈绍宽; traditional Chinese: 陳紹寬; pinyin: Chén Shàokuān; October 7, 1889 – July 30, 1969) was a Chinese Fleet Admiral who served as the senior commander of the Republic of China Navy during the Second Sino-Japanese War and World War II. He pioneered the development of Chinese naval aviation and was a proponent of aircraft carriers for the navy, more than half a century before the commissioning of China's first-ever aircraft carrier Liaoning.

== Early life and career ==
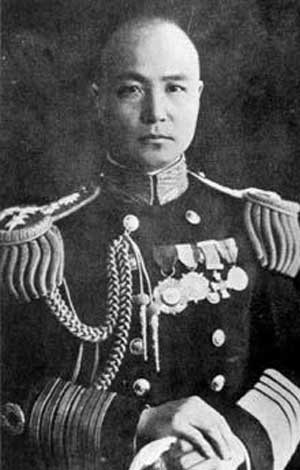
Chen Shaokuan

Chen Shaokuan was born on October 7, 1889 in Chengmen Town in Cangshan, Fuzhou. Chen's father served in the Imperial Chinese Navy, originally having a career in carpentry. He took an interest to his father's occupation, attending the Jiangnan Naval Academy in Nanjing at the age of 17. At 20 years old he graduated from the academy and was assigned to the training cruiser Tongji, then in 1910 he served aboard the Jingqing. Rising up the ranks, he was promoted to Lieutenant Commander on the eve of World War I in 1914, now serving for the navy of the Republic of China.

=== World War I ===
Since China was mainly neutral during WW1, Chen had limited involvement in the war. In an event unrelated to the war, he was once again promoted, this time as a commander, now assigned to the Zhaohe. He witnessed naval combat for the first time after visiting the United States and United Kingdom onboard British warships despite the many dangers that he would have faced at the time. Chen also served as a naval attaché to France, Italy and the United Kingdom.

=== Interwar period ===
Chen Shaokuan joined the National Revolutionary Army in 1927, becoming Deputy Director of the Navy Department in 1929, then head of the Navy Department in 1932. He also served as a member of the Military Affairs Commission of the National Government and an executive member of the Central Committee of the KMT.

== Second Sino-Japanese War ==
With the start of the Second Sino-Japanese War in 1937, Chen worked to organize waterborne and coastal defenses, including closing off the Yangtze River, for the protection of the capital of Nanjing. In 1938, he was promoted to Commander-in-Chief of the Navy. After the National Government moved its capital to Chongqing, he actively organized navy guerrillas behind enemy lines to fight the enemy and cooperate with the various battlefield operations throughout the country.

He was relieved from duty by Chiang Kai-shek in 1945 after unsuccessfully attempting to request peaceful conclusions to conflicts during the Chinese Civil War and budget for building aircraft carriers for the Republic of China Navy. Towards the end of the Civil War in April 1949, it was reported that Zhu Shaoliang asked Chen to retreat to Taiwan with the remnants of the Republic of China and Chen persistently refused his offer.

== Establishment of the People's Republic of China ==
After the establishment of the People's Republic of China in 1949, Chen Shaokuan was appointed a member of the East China Military and Political Committee, Vice Chairman of the Fujian Provincial People's Government, Vice Governor, Vice Chairman of the People's Revolution Central Committee, etc., and was elected as a representative of the first, second and third National People's Congress, a member of the Plenipotentiary, and a member of the National Defense Committee of the People's Republic of China.

In 1969, he died of stomach cancer at the age of 80.

Military offices
Preceded by Yang Shuzhuang	Minister of Navy of the Republic of China; 1932–1938	Reorganised as Chief of Navy in the Republic of China Navy
New title	Chief of Navy of the Republic of China Navy; 1938–1945	Office abolished
