= Orders, decorations, and medals of the Republic of China =

This is a list of orders, decorations and medals of the Republic of China, usually known as Taiwan after 1949. This list is sorted in order of precedence of the highest grade of each award on a full military dress. The Honour Sabre is a special case and is listed separately under Military orders, as per its official classification by the Ministry of National Defense.

== Military orders ==
Name	Grades	Awarded for	Ribbon bar	Instituted
Order of National Glory 國光勳章	1 (Grand Cordon)	Distinguished contributions to national defense		8 November 1937
Order of Blue Sky and White Sun 青天白日勳章	1 (Grand Cordon)	Outstanding contributions to national defense		15 May 1929
Order of the Sacred Tripod 寶鼎勳章	1 (Special Grand Cordon)	Repelling foreign invasion or quelling internal unrest		15 May 1929
Order of the Sacred Tripod 寶鼎勳章	2 (Grand Cordon)	Repelling foreign invasion or quelling internal unrest		15 May 1929
Order of the Sacred Tripod 寶鼎勳章	3 (Red Grand Cordon)	Repelling foreign invasion or quelling internal unrest		15 May 1929
Order of the Sacred Tripod 寶鼎勳章	4 (Special Cravat)	Repelling foreign invasion or quelling internal unrest		15 May 1929
Order of the Sacred Tripod 寶鼎勳章	5 (Cravat)	Repelling foreign invasion or quelling internal unrest		15 May 1929
Order of the Sacred Tripod 寶鼎勳章	6 (Special Rosette)	Repelling foreign invasion or quelling internal unrest		15 May 1929
Order of the Sacred Tripod 寶鼎勳章	7 (Rosette)	Repelling foreign invasion or quelling internal unrest		15 May 1929
Order of the Sacred Tripod 寶鼎勳章	8 (Special Ribbon)	Repelling foreign invasion or quelling internal unrest		15 May 1929
Order of the Sacred Tripod 寶鼎勳章	9 (Ribbon)	Repelling foreign invasion or quelling internal unrest		15 May 1929
Order of Loyalty and Valour 忠勇勳章	1 (Ribbon)	Bravery in combat		23 September 1944
Order of the Cloud and Banner 雲麾勳章	1 (Special Grand Cordon)	Contributions to the nation or quelling internal unrest		15 June 1935
Order of the Cloud and Banner 雲麾勳章	2 (Grand Cordon)	Contributions to the nation or quelling internal unrest		15 June 1935
Order of the Cloud and Banner 雲麾勳章	3 (Yellow Grand Cordon)	Contributions to the nation or quelling internal unrest		15 June 1935
Order of the Cloud and Banner 雲麾勳章	4 (Special Cravat)	Contributions to the nation or quelling internal unrest		15 June 1935
Order of the Cloud and Banner 雲麾勳章	5 (Cravat)	Contributions to the nation or quelling internal unrest		15 June 1935
Order of the Cloud and Banner 雲麾勳章	6 (Special Rosette)	Contributions to the nation or quelling internal unrest		15 June 1935
Order of the Cloud and Banner 雲麾勳章	7 (Rosette)	Contributions to the nation or quelling internal unrest		15 June 1935
Order of the Cloud and Banner 雲麾勳章	8 (Special Ribbon)	Contributions to the nation or quelling internal unrest		15 June 1935
Order of the Cloud and Banner 雲麾勳章	9 (Ribbon)	Contributions to the nation or quelling internal unrest		15 June 1935
Order of Loyalty and Diligence 忠勤勳章	1 (Ribbon)	10 years' service in the military and meeting academic criteria		23 September 1944
Order of Grand Community 大同勳章	1 (Ribbon)	Significant contributions to the Air Force in battle or in its construction		14 June 1945
Order of Cosmic Diagram 河圖勳章	1 (Ribbon)	Bravery in combat with 1,800 hours of flight time or 600 missions in the Air Force		14 June 1945
Order of Book of Nature 洛書勳章	1 (Ribbon)	Bravery in combat with 1,500 hours of flight time or 500 missions in the Air Force		14 June 1945
Order of Sublime Commencement 乾元勳章	1 (Ribbon)	Bravery in combat with 1,200 hours of flight time or 400 missions in the Air Force		14 June 1945
Order of Renaissance and Honour 復興榮譽勳章	1 (Ribbon)	9 kills, 900 hours of flight time or 300 missions in the Air Force		3 December 1937
Order of Renaissance and Honour 復興榮譽勳章	2 (Ribbon)	6 kills, 750 hours of flight time or 250 missions in the Air Force		3 December 1937
Order of Renaissance and Honour 復興榮譽勳章	3 (Ribbon)	3 kills, 600 hours of flight time or 200 missions in the Air Force		3 December 1937
Order of Victory of Resistance against Aggression 抗戰勝利勳章	1 (Ribbon)	Contributions to the Chinese nation during the Second Sino-Japanese War		10 October 1945
Order in Commemoration of the Tenth Anniversary of the Oath-taking of the National Revolutionary Army 國民革命軍誓師十週年紀念勳章	1 (Ribbon)	Officers who hold the rank of Major General or above and who have commanded a Division-level unit or above, and took the oath to unify the country in 1926, Guangdong.		8 July 1936

Name	Grades	Awarded for	Instituted
Honour Sabre of the Awakened Lion 醒獅勳刀	1 (9 Lions, yellow tassel)	Already-highly decorated officers who are deserving of more commendation	23 November 1931
Honour Sabre of the Awakened Lion 醒獅勳刀	2 (7 Lions, blue tassel)	Already-highly decorated officers who are deserving of more commendation	23 November 1931
Honour Sabre of the Awakened Lion 醒獅勳刀	3 (5 Lions, red tassel)	Already-highly decorated officers who are deserving of more commendation	23 November 1931

== Military medals ==
=== General Armed Forces medals ===
Name	Grades	Awarded for	Ribbon bar	Instituted
Medal of the Armed Forces 陸海空軍獎章	A-1 (Ribbon)	Outstanding performance or exhibiting special technical skills		15 August 1929
Medal of the Armed Forces 陸海空軍獎章	A-2 (Ribbon)	Outstanding performance or exhibiting special technical skills		15 August 1929
Medal of the Armed Forces 陸海空軍獎章	B-1 (Ribbon)	Outstanding performance or exhibiting special technical skills		15 August 1929
Medal of the Armed Forces 陸海空軍獎章	B-2 (Ribbon)	Outstanding performance or exhibiting special technical skills		15 August 1929
Medal of the Brilliant Light 光華獎章	A-1 (Ribbon)	Outstanding performance or exhibiting special technical skills		7 September 1937
Medal of the Brilliant Light 光華獎章	A-2 (Ribbon)	Outstanding performance or exhibiting special technical skills		7 September 1937
Medal of the Brilliant Light 光華獎章	B-1 (Ribbon)	Outstanding performance or exhibiting special technical skills		7 September 1937
Medal of the Brilliant Light 光華獎章	B-2 (Ribbon)	Outstanding performance or exhibiting special technical skills		7 September 1937
Medal of Victorious Garrison 干城獎章	A-1 (Ribbon)	Outstanding performance or exhibiting special technical skills		7 September 1937
Medal of Victorious Garrison 干城獎章	A-2 (Ribbon)	Outstanding performance or exhibiting special technical skills		7 September 1937
Medal of Victorious Garrison 干城獎章	B-1 (Ribbon)	Outstanding performance or exhibiting special technical skills		7 September 1937
Medal of Victorious Garrison 干城獎章	B-2 (Ribbon)	Outstanding performance or exhibiting special technical skills		7 September 1937
Medal of Loyalty and Integrity 忠貞獎章	1 (Ribbon and Stars)	Soldiers who are wounded in combat.		Dec 1945
Medal of the Spirit of Chu 莒光獎章	A-1 (Ribbon)	Significant contributions to the Armed Forces in the areas of technology, logistics and finance.		12 June 1971
Medal of the Spirit of Chu 莒光獎章	A-2 (Ribbon)	Significant contributions to the Armed Forces in the areas of technology, logistics and finance.		12 June 1971
Medal of the Spirit of Chu 莒光獎章	B-1 (Ribbon)	Significant contributions to the Armed Forces in the areas of technology, logistics and finance.		12 June 1971
Medal of the Spirit of Chu 莒光獎章	B-2 (Ribbon)	Significant contributions to the Armed Forces in the areas of technology, logistics and finance.		12 June 1971
Medal of Victory of Resistance against Aggression 抗戰勝利獎章	1 (Ribbon)	Contributions during the Second Sino-Japanese War.		8 January 1946

=== Army medals ===
Name	Grades	Awarded for	Ribbon bar	Instituted
Medal of Army Brilliance 陸光獎章	A (Ribbon)	Being victorious in combat, proactively render assistance to friendly troops, and other significant contributions.		5 May 1958
Medal of Army Brilliance 陸光獎章	B (Ribbon)	Being victorious in combat, proactively render assistance to friendly troops, and other significant contributions.		5 May 1958
Medal of Outstanding Service 金甌獎章	A (Ribbon)	Significant contributions such as destroying enemy forces, securing the border, preventing rebellions or participation in military projects		5 May 1958
Medal of Outstanding Service 金甌獎章	B (Ribbon)	Significant contributions such as destroying enemy forces, securing the border, preventing rebellions or participation in military projects		5 May 1958
Medal of Bravery 虎賁獎章	A (Ribbon)	Significant contributions during battle, such as destroying enemy fortifications, routing enemy reinforcements, and assisting the main force in combat.		5 May 1958
Medal of Bravery 虎賁獎章	B (Ribbon)	Significant contributions during battle, such as destroying enemy fortifications, routing enemy reinforcements, and assisting the main force in combat.		5 May 1958
Medal of Outstanding Staff 弼亮獎章	A (Ribbon)	Significant contributions in research.		5 May 1958
Medal of Outstanding Staff 弼亮獎章	B (Ribbon)	Significant contributions in research.		5 May 1958
Medal of Army Achievement 景風獎章	A (Ribbon)	Being corruption-free and highly productive.		5 May 1958
Medal of Army Achievement 景風獎章	B (Ribbon)	Being corruption-free and highly productive.		5 May 1958
Medal of Excellent Efficiency 寶星獎章	1-9 (Ribbon and Stars)	1 Star for every 3 years of service and meeting academic requirements, up to 9 Stars.		5 May 1958

=== Navy medals ===
Name	Grades	Awarded for	Ribbon bar	Instituted
Medal of Naval Brilliance 海光獎章	1 (Ribbon)	Contributions in command or combat, for conspicuous gallantry and those wounded on duty.		19 July 1951
Medal of Naval Achievement 海功獎章	1 (Ribbon)	Contributions in combat.		19 July 1951
Medal of Naval Merit 海勳獎章	1 (Ribbon)	Contributions to military strategy, military literature and technological research.		19 July 1951
Medal of Naval Distinguished Service 海績獎章	1 (Ribbon)	Meeting labour service requirements.		19 July 1951
Medal of Naval Disposition 海風獎章	1 (Ribbon)	Those with good moral character, or for excellent performance during exercises or parades.		19 July 1951
Marine Corps Medal 陸戰獎章	1 (Ribbon)	Contributions in combat, training, or research.		30 August 1972

=== Air Force medals ===
Name	Grades	Awarded for	Ribbon bar	Instituted
Star Medal 星序獎章	1 (9 Stars)	9 kills.	NA	5 May 1938
Star Medal 星序獎章	2 (8 Stars)	8 kills.	NA	5 May 1938
Star Medal 星序獎章	3 (7 Stars)	7 kills.	NA	5 May 1938
Star Medal 星序獎章	4 (6 Stars)	6 kills.	NA	5 May 1938
Star Medal 星序獎章	5 (5 Stars)	5 kills.	NA	5 May 1938
Star Medal 星序獎章	6 (4 Stars)	4 kills.	NA	5 May 1938
Star Medal 星序獎章	7 (3 Stars)	3 kills.	NA	5 May 1938
Star Medal 星序獎章	8 (2 Stars)	2 kills.	NA	5 May 1938
Star Medal 星序獎章	9 (1 Star)	1 kill.	NA	5 May 1938
Medal of Rising Roc 鵬舉獎章	1 (Ribbon)	540 flight hours or 180 missions.	NA	14 June 1945
Medal of Flying Dragon 雲龍獎章	1 (Ribbon)	480 flight hours or 160 missions.	NA	14 June 1945
Medal of Flying Tiger 飛虎獎章	1 (Ribbon)	420 flight hours or 140 missions.	NA	14 June 1945
Medal of Winged Leopard 翔豹獎章	1 (Ribbon)	360 flight hours or 120 missions.	NA	14 June 1945
Medal of Rapacious Condor 雄鷲獎章	1 (Ribbon)	300 flight hours or 100 missions.	NA	14 June 1945
Medal of Vermilion Bow 彤弓獎章	1 (Ribbon)	180 flight hours or 60 missions.	NA	14 June 1945
Medal of Awe-Inspiring 宣威獎章	1 (Ribbon)	Service to the Air Force.	NA	2 March 1939
Medal of Awe-Inspiring 宣威獎章	2 (Ribbon)	Service to the Air Force.	NA	2 March 1939
Medal of Awe-Inspiring 宣威獎章	3 (Ribbon)	Service to the Air Force.	NA	2 March 1939
Medal of Distinguished Service 懋績獎章	A-1 (Ribbon)	Distinguished service in the areas of research, training, competitions and inspections.	NA	8 April 1943
Medal of Distinguished Service 懋績獎章	A-2 (Ribbon)	Distinguished service in the areas of research, training, competitions and inspections.	NA	8 April 1943
Medal of Distinguished Service 懋績獎章	B-1 (Ribbon)	Distinguished service in the areas of research, training, competitions and inspections.	NA	8 April 1943
Medal of Distinguished Service 懋績獎章	B-2 (Ribbon)	Distinguished service in the areas of research, training, competitions and inspections.	NA	8 April 1943
Exemplary Medal 楷模獎章	A-1 (Ribbon)	Good conduct.	NA	8 April 1943
Exemplary Medal 楷模獎章	A-2 (Ribbon)	Good conduct.	NA	8 April 1943
Exemplary Medal 楷模獎章	B-1 (Ribbon)	Good conduct.	NA	8 April 1943
Exemplary Medal 楷模獎章	B-2 (Ribbon)	Good conduct.	NA	8 April 1943

=== Victory medals ===
Name	Grades	Awarded for	Ribbon bar	Instituted
Medal of Scholarship 績學獎章	1 (Ribbon)	Achievement in academic competitions.	NA	1 August 1935
Medal of Scholarship 績學獎章	2 (Ribbon)	Achievement in academic competitions.	NA	1 August 1935
Medal of Marksmanship 射擊獎章	1 (Ribbon)	Achievement in marksmanship competitions.	NA	1 August 1935
Medal of Marksmanship 射擊獎章	2 (Ribbon)	Achievement in marksmanship competitions.	NA	1 August 1935
Medal of Horsemanship 騎術獎章	1 (Ribbon)	Achievement in riding competitions.	NA	1 August 1935
Medal of Horsemanship 騎術獎章	2 (Ribbon)	Achievement in riding competitions.	NA	1 August 1935
Medal of Seamanship 操舟獎章	1 (Ribbon)	Achievement in rowing competitions.	NA	1 August 1935
Medal of Seamanship 操舟獎章	2 (Ribbon)	Achievement in rowing competitions.	NA	1 August 1935
Medal of Flying 飛行獎章	1 (Ribbon)	Achievement in aviation competitions.	NA	1 August 1935
Medal of Flying 飛行獎章	2 (Ribbon)	Achievement in aviation competitions.	NA	1 August 1935
Medal of Special Skill 特技獎章	1 (Ribbon)	Achievement in martial arts or sports competitions.	NA	1 August 1935
Medal of Special Skill 特技獎章	2 (Ribbon)	Achievement in martial arts or sports competitions.	NA	1 August 1935
Medal of Maintenance 修護獎章	1 (Ribbon)	Excellence in maintenance work.	NA	19 July 1971
Medal of Maintenance 修護獎章	2 (Ribbon)	Excellence in maintenance work.	NA	19 July 1971

== Commemorative and Service awards ==
Name	Grades	Awarded for	Ribbon bar	Instituted
功標				
NCO Soldier Honor Medal 士官士兵榮譽紀念章				
Anti-Japanese War Victory Medal 抗戰勝利紀念章				
蔣委員長西安蒙難紀念章				
作戰負傷榮譽紀念章				
克難英雄紀念章				
國防部服務紀念章				
外島地區服務紀念章				
艱苦地區服務紀念章				
各軍種服務紀念章				
軍紀競賽個人優勝榮譽標				
榮譽旗旗標	1	Loyalty and bravery.		
陸海空軍官校榮譽旗旗標				

== Civilian orders ==
Name	Grades	Awarded for	Ribbon bar	Instituted
Order of Brilliant Jade 采玉大勳章	1 (Grand Cordon)	President of the Republic of China and Foreign heads of state.		2 December 1933
Order of Dr. Sun Yat-Sen 中山勳章	1 (Grand Cordon)	Contributions to national development.		12 February 1941
Order of Chiang Chung-Cheng 中正勳章	1 (Grand Cordon)	1. Implementation of the Three Principles of the People; 2. Anti-communism (historical) and National development 3. Revival of Chinese culture 4. Implementation of democratic reforms		11 January 1980
Order of Propitious Clouds 卿雲勳章	1 (Special Grand Cordon)	Contributions to national and societal development.		12 February 1941
Order of Propitious Clouds 卿雲勳章	2 (Grand Cordon)	Contributions to national and societal development.		12 February 1941
Order of Propitious Clouds 卿雲勳章	3 (Green Grand Cordon)	Contributions to national and societal development.		12 February 1941
Order of Propitious Clouds 卿雲勳章	4 (Special Cravat)	Contributions to national and societal development.		12 February 1941
Order of Propitious Clouds 卿雲勳章	5 (Cravat)	Contributions to national and societal development.		12 February 1941
Order of Propitious Clouds 卿雲勳章	6 (Special Rosette)	Contributions to national and societal development.		12 February 1941
Order of Propitious Clouds 卿雲勳章	7 (Rosette)	Contributions to national and societal development.		12 February 1941
Order of Propitious Clouds 卿雲勳章	8 (Special Ribbon)	Contributions to national and societal development.		12 February 1941
Order of Propitious Clouds 卿雲勳章	9 (Ribbon)	Contributions to national and societal development.		12 February 1941
Order of Brilliant Star 景星勳章	1 (Special Grand Cordon)	Contributions to national and societal development.		12 February 1941
Order of Brilliant Star 景星勳章	2 (Grand Cordon)	Contributions to national and societal development.		12 February 1941
Order of Brilliant Star 景星勳章	3 (Purple Grand Cordon)	Contributions to national and societal development.		12 February 1941
Order of Brilliant Star 景星勳章	4 (Special Cravat)	Contributions to national and societal development.		12 February 1941
Order of Brilliant Star 景星勳章	5 (Cravat)	Contributions to national and societal development.		12 February 1941
Order of Brilliant Star 景星勳章	6 (Special Rosette)	Contributions to national and societal development.		12 February 1941
Order of Brilliant Star 景星勳章	7 (Rosette)	Contributions to national and societal development.		12 February 1941
Order of Brilliant Star 景星勳章	8 (Special Ribbon)	Contributions to national and societal development.		12 February 1941
Order of Brilliant Star 景星勳章	9 (Ribbon)	Contributions to national and societal development.		12 February 1941
Public Servants' Service Medal	NA	NA	NA	NA
Medal of Culture 文化獎	1 (Gold)	Contributions to the cultural affairs of the Republic of China.		31 January 2020
Medal of Culture 文化獎	2 (Silver)	Contributions to the cultural affairs of the Republic of China.		31 January 2020
Medal of Culture 文化獎	3 (Bronze)	Contributions to the cultural affairs of the Republic of China.		31 January 2020

== Defunct orders ==
Prior to the modern system, the Republican government established numerous orders that are now defunct.

=== Nanjing Era ===
After the founding of the Republic, the Provisional Government of the Republic of China (1912) in Nanjing established the following orders in 1912:

- Order of the Nine Tripods (九鼎勳章): 9 grades, a military decoration.
- Order of Tiger and Bear (虎羆勳章): 9 grades, a military decoration.
- Order of the Waking Lion (醒獅勳章): 9 grades, mixed military and civilian decoration.

=== Beiyang Era ===
The Beiyang government re-established the honour system with the following orders:

- Grand Merit Order (大勳章): for ceremonial use by the Head of State.
- Badge of Mongolian, Hui and Tibetan Nobility (蒙回藏爵章): 5 grades, awarded to lords of Mongolia, Xinjiang and Tibet who bore Qing dynasty princely and ducal titles. The grades of this order correspond to Qing's princely ranks.
- Order of Rank and Merit (勳位章): 5 grades, highest general decoration.
- Order of Precious Brilliant Golden Grain (寶光嘉禾勳章): 5 grades and 6 classes, awarded only to high-level officials.
- Order of the Golden Grain (嘉禾勳章): 9 grades, civilian decoration.
- Order of the White Eagle (白鷹勳章): 9 grades.
- Order of the Striped Tiger (文虎勳章): 9 grades, military decoration.
- Order of Cloud and Crane (雲鶴勳章)
- Order of the Golden Lion (金獅勳章)
- Order of the Nebula (星雲勳章)
- Order of the Begonia (棠勳章)
- Medal of Compassion (慈惠章): awarded to women in charitable works.

Various warlords also issued their own orders and commemorative medals.

== See also ==
- Imperial yellow jacket
- Mandarin square
- Nine bestowments
- Order of the Double Dragon
