= Chief of the General Staff (Republic of China) =

Office of the Republic of China

- 參謀總長 (Chinese)
- Standard of the Chief of the General Staff

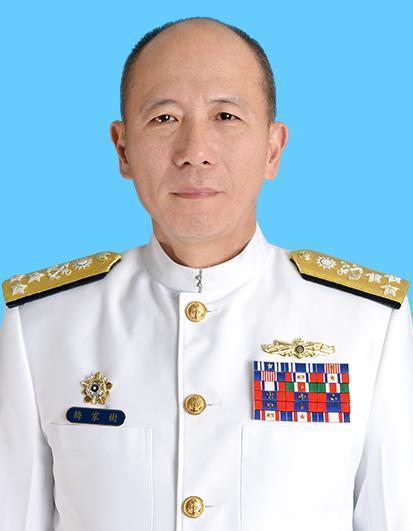
- Incumbent; Mei Chia-shu since 1 May 2023
- Republic of China Armed Forces
- Member of: General Staff Headquarters
- Reports to: Minister of National Defense
- Formation: 23 May 1946
- First holder: Chen Cheng
- Deputy: Executive Vice Chief of General Staff

The Chief of the General Staff (Chinese: 參謀總長) is the chief of defence of the Republic of China Armed Forces in Taiwan.

== List of officeholders ==
No.	Portrait	Chief of the General Staff	Took office	Left office	Time in office	Defence branch	Ref.
1	Chen Cheng (陳誠)	General; Chen Cheng (陳誠) (1897–1965)	23 May 1946	12 May 1948	1 year, 355 days	Republic of China Army	
2	Gu Zhutong (顧祝同)	General; Gu Zhutong (顧祝同) (1893–1987)	13 May 1948	24 March 1950	1 year, 315 days	Republic of China Army	
3	Zhou Zhi-rou [zh] (周至柔)	General; Zhou Zhi-rou (周至柔) (1899–1986)	25 March 1950	30 June 1954	4 years, 97 days	Republic of China Air Force	
4	Gui Yong-qing [zh] (桂永清)	Admiral; Gui Yong-qing (桂永清) (1901–1954)	1 July 1954	17 August 1954 †	47 days	Republic of China Navy	
5	Peng Meng-chi (彭孟緝)	General; Peng Meng-chi (彭孟緝) (1908–1997)	18 August 1954	30 June 1957	2 years, 316 days	Republic of China Army	
6	Wang Shu-ming (王叔銘)	General; Wang Shu-ming (王叔銘) (1905–1998)	1 July 1957	30 June 1959	1 year, 364 days	Republic of China Air Force	
7	Peng Meng-chi (彭孟緝)	Senior General; Peng Meng-chi (彭孟緝) (1908–1997)	1 July 1959	30 June 1965	5 years, 364 days	Republic of China Army	
8	Ni Yue-si [zh] (黎玉璽)	Senior Admiral; Ni Yue-si (黎玉璽) (1914–2003)	1 July 1965	30 June 1967	1 year, 364 days	Republic of China Navy	
9	Kao Kuei-yuan (高魁元)	Senior General; Kao Kuei-yuan (高魁元) (1907–2012)	1 July 1965	30 June 1970	4 years, 364 days	Republic of China Army	
10	Lai Ming-tang [zh] (賴名湯)	Senior General; Lai Ming-tang (賴名湯) (1911–1984)	1 July 1970	30 June 1976	5 years, 365 days	Republic of China Air Force	
11	Song Chang-chih [zh] (宋長志)	Senior Admiral; Song Chang-chih (宋長志) (1916–2002)	1 July 1976	30 November 1981	5 years, 152 days	Republic of China Navy	
12	Hau Pei-tsun (郝柏村)	Senior General; Hau Pei-tsun (郝柏村) (1919–2020)	1 December 1981	4 December 1989	8 years, 3 days	Republic of China Army	
13	Chen Hsing-ling (陳燊齡)	Senior General; Chen Hsing-ling (陳燊齡) (1926–2017)	5 December 1989	4 December 1991	1 year, 364 days	Republic of China Air Force	
14	Liu Ho-chien (劉和謙)	Senior Admiral; Liu Ho-chien (劉和謙) (1926–2023)	5 December 1991	30 June 1995	3 years, 207 days	Republic of China Navy	
15	Luo Ben-li [zh] (羅本立)	Senior General; Luo Ben-li (羅本立) (1927–2018)	1 July 1995	4 March 1998	2 years, 246 days	Republic of China Army	
16	Tang Fei (唐飛)	Senior General; Tang Fei (唐飛) (born 1932)	5 March 1998	31 January 1999	332 days	Republic of China Air Force	
17	Tang Yao-ming (湯曜明)	Senior General; Tang Yao-ming (湯曜明) (1938–2021)	1 February 1999	31 January 2002	2 years, 364 days	Republic of China Army	
18	Lee Jye (李傑)	Senior Admiral; Lee Jye (李傑) (born 1940)	1 February 2002	19 May 2004	2 years, 108 days	Republic of China Navy	
19	Lee Tien-yu (李天羽)	Senior General; Lee Tien-yu (李天羽) (1946–2024)	20 May 2004	31 January 2007	2 years, 256 days	Republic of China Air Force	
20	Huo Shou-yeh [zh] (霍守業)	Senior General; Huo Shou-yeh (霍守業) (born 1943)	1 February 2007	4 February 2009	2 years, 3 days	Republic of China Army	
21	Lin Chen-yi (林鎮夷)	Senior Admiral; Lin Chen-yi (林鎮夷) (born 1945)	5 February 2009	16 January 2013	3 years, 346 days	Republic of China Navy	
22	Yen Ming (嚴明)	General; Yen Ming (嚴明) (born 1949)	17 January 2013	7 August 2013	202 days	Republic of China Air Force	
23	Kao Kuang-chi (高廣圻)	Admiral; Kao Kuang-chi (高廣圻) (born 1950)	8 August 2013	30 January 2015	1 year, 175 days	Republic of China Navy	
24	Yen Teh-fa (嚴德發)	General; Yen Teh-fa (嚴德發) (born 1952)	31 January 2015	30 November 2016	1 year, 304 days	Republic of China Army	
25	Chiu Kuo-cheng (邱國正)	General; Chiu Kuo-cheng (邱國正) (born 1953)	1 December 2016	28 April 2017	149 days	Republic of China Army	
26	Lee Hsi-ming (李喜明)	Admiral; Lee Hsi-ming (李喜明) (born 1955)	28 April 2017	1 July 2019	2 years, 64 days	Republic of China Navy	
27	Shen Yi-ming(沈一鳴)	General; Shen Yi-ming (沈一鳴) (1957–2020)	1 July 2019	2 January 2020 †	216 days	Republic of China Air Force	
–	Liu Chih-pin(劉志斌)	Admiral; Liu Chih-pin (劉志斌) (born 1962); Acting	2 January 2020	15 January 2020	13 days	Republic of China Navy	
28	Huang Shu-kuang(黃曙光)	Admiral; Huang Shu-kuang (黃曙光) (born 1957)	15 January 2020	30 June 2021	1 year, 166 days	Republic of China Navy	
29	Chen Pao-yu(陳寶餘)	General; Chen Pao-yu (陳寶餘) (born 1958)	1 July 2021	30 April 2023	1 year, 303 days	Republic of China Army	
30	Mei Chia-shu(梅家樹)	Admiral; Mei Chia-shu (梅家樹) (born 1963)	1 May 2023	Incumbent	3 years, 129 days	Republic of China Navy	

== See also ==
- Republic of China Armed Forces
