= Order of Loyalty and Valour =

Order of Loyalty and Valour 忠勇勳章
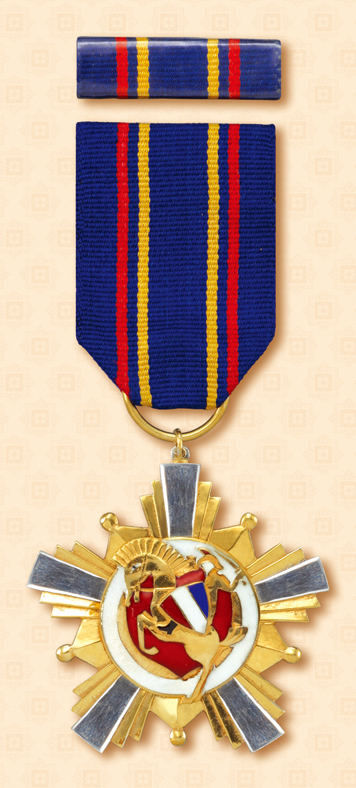
- Type: Order of honour
- Awarded for: Outstanding command in battle while wounded
- Country: Republic of China
- Presented by: President of Taiwan
- Eligibility: Military personnel
- Campaign: Second Sino-Japanese War
- Status: Currently awarded
- Established: 23 September 1944
- Ribbon

Precedence
- Next (higher): Order of the Cloud and Banner

- Next (lower): Order of Loyalty and Diligence

Order of Loyalty and Valour (Chinese: 忠勇勳章, romanized: Zhōngyǒng xūnzhāng) is a military award of the Republic of China. It was created on 23 September 1944 for outstanding command in battle.

== History ==
The Order of Loyalty and Valor is awarded for great courage while wounded. According to Robert Werlich, it is the only decoration awarded under this specific condition. The Order has one class.

In 2016, the Legislative Yuan decided that there had not been enough recent conflict to justify the awarding of this medal to personnel for bravery, so the regulations regarded the awarding thereof were changed to allow those "...who, in order to protect the people, are loyal to their duties, and automatically perform extraordinary heroic acts, are qualified to be honorable."

== Characteristics ==
The badge's emblem is a gold and silver star with multiple rays. The central medallion is white and depicts a highly stylized horse and rider; the rider holds a golden sword and a shield of red, white, and blue. The background of the horse and rider is in red enamel. The ribbon is light blue with narrow red and yellow stripes towards one edge and narrow yellow and red stripes towards the other edge.

== Bibliography ==
- Werlich, Robert (1974). Orders and Decorations of All Nations: Ancient and Modern, Civil and Military (2nd ed.). Washington: Quaker Press. p. 476. OCLC 978556.
