= Liu Ho-chien =

Taiwanese admiral (1926–2023)

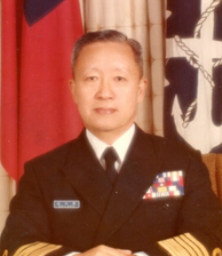
Liu during active service years

Liu Ho-chien (Chinese: 劉和謙; 28 August 1926 – 14 December 2023) was a Taiwanese admiral who commanded the Republic of China Navy in the 1980s and served as Chief of the General Staff in the 1990s.

== Life and career ==
A native of Hefei, born in 1926, Liu first applied to attend the Republic of China Naval Academy at the age of fourteen, by writing Saving the Nation by Joining the Navy, (海軍救國論), and was a member of the academy's graduating class of 1947.

Liu was Commander of the Republic of China Navy from 1983 to 1988, then became an adviser to president Lee Teng-hui. Lee appointed Liu Chief of the General Staff in 1991, and Liu held the post until 1995. Liu voluntarily vacated his position on the Central Standing Committee of the Kuomintang in 1992, representing efforts to nationalize the Republic of China Armed Forces. Liu was succeeded as chief of the general staff by Luo Ben-li in 1995, and awarded the Order of Blue Sky and White Sun that same year. Liu subsequently returned to the Office of the President as an adviser for Lee Teng-hui, Chen Shui-bian, Ma Ying-jeou, and Tsai Ing-wen. In 2000, Liu was investigated for his potential connection to the murder of Yin Ching-feng, following allegations of Liu's involvement being publicized in March 1998 by Yin's younger brother, which later uncovered the Lafayette-class frigate scandal. During the investigation in 2000, Liu was barred from leaving Taiwan, and became the highest-ranking military officer subjected to such a restriction.

Liu died on 14 December 2023, at the age of 97, and was buried at Wuzhi Mountain Military Cemetery.
