= 2020 ROCAF UH-60M crash =

Helicopter accident in Taiwan

Coordinates: 25°00′40″N 121°26′45″E

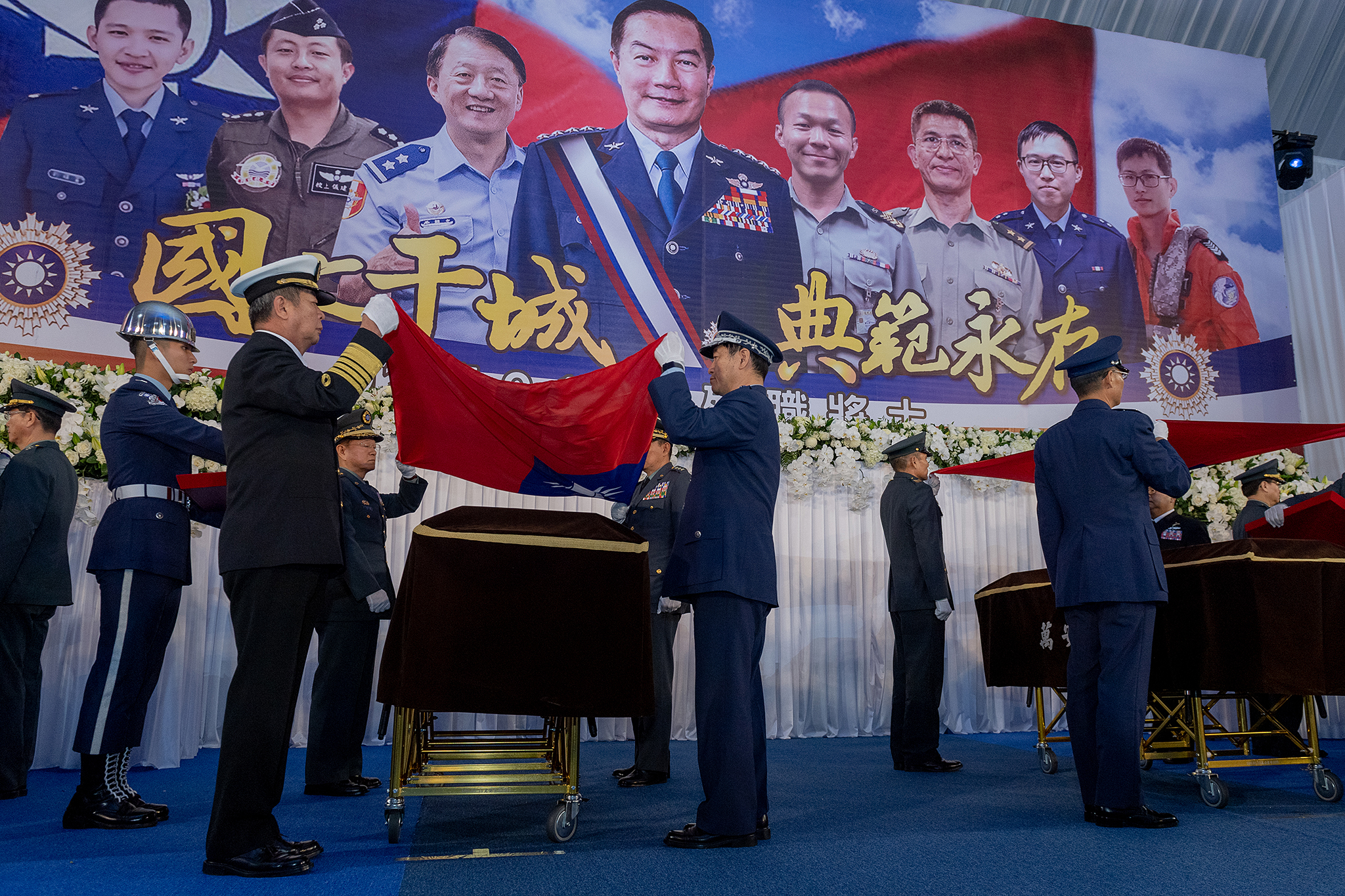
- Joint funeral at Songshan Air Base, Taipei in memorial of the deceased in the 2020 New Taipei helicopter crash, with flag draped coffins on the front

Accident
- Date: 2 January 2020
- Summary: Pilot error due to inclement weather
- Site: Wulai District, New Taipei, Taiwan

Aircraft
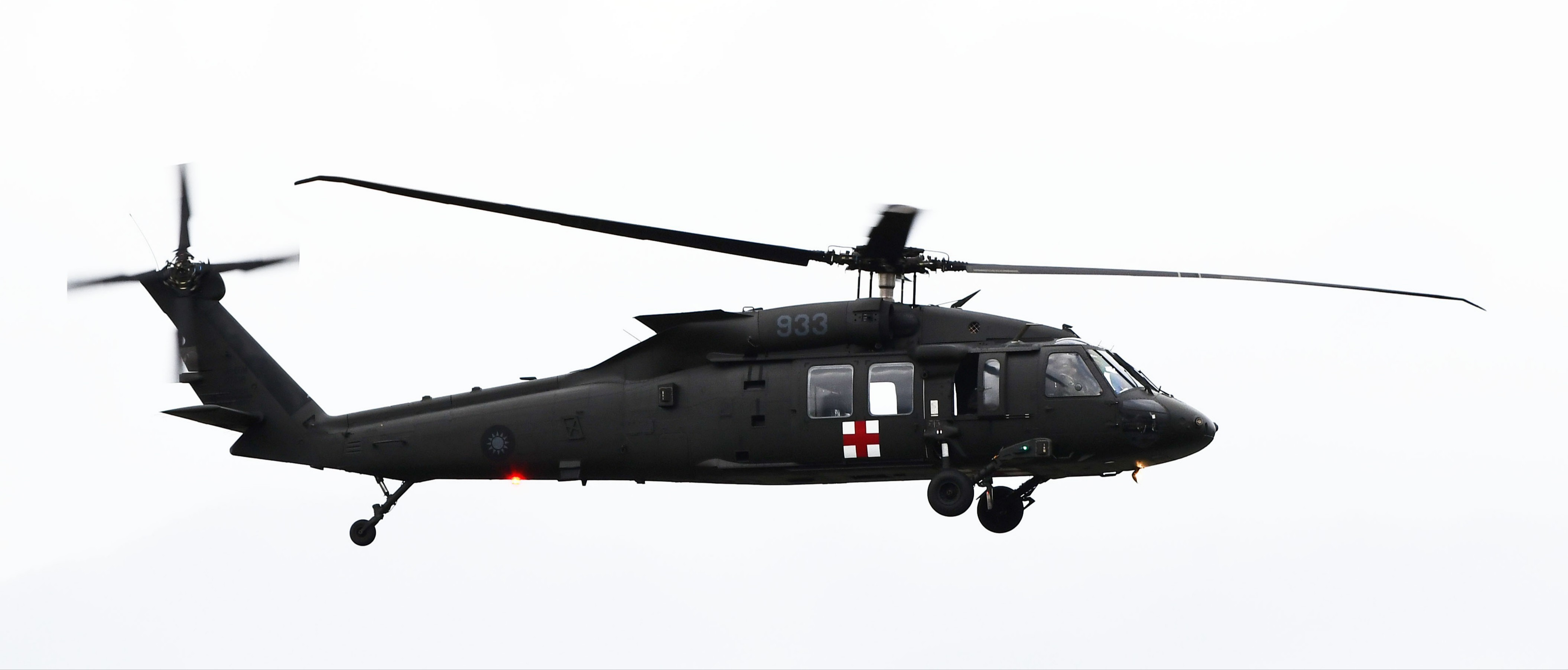
- 933, the ROC Army Black Hawk helicopter involved in the accident, seen in 2018
- Aircraft type: Sikorsky UH-60 Black Hawk
- Operator: Republic of China Air Force
- Registration: 933
- Flight origin: Songshan Air Base, Taipei, Taiwan
- Destination: Dong'aoling Radar Station, Su'ao, Yilan County, Taiwan
- Occupants: 13
- Passengers: 10
- Crew: 3
- Fatalities: 8
- Injuries: 5
- Survivors: 5

On 2 January 2020, a Black Hawk helicopter of the Republic of China Air Force (ROCAF) Air Rescue Group crashed in the Wulai District of New Taipei, Taiwan, while executing a VIP transport mission. General Shen Yi-ming, Republic of China's Chief of the General Staff (CGS), along with seven other personnel on board, died in the accident.

== Accident ==
The Black Hawk was taking off for a routine mission to visit service personnel in Dong'aoling Radar Station, Su'ao, Yilan county. The helicopter lost contact with Songshan Air Base at 8:07 AM, thirteen minutes after taking off and crashed into a mountainside.

General Shen Yi-ming, Chief of the General Staff, was on board the helicopter along with seven other officers and a senior enlisted adviser from the General Staff Headquarters, Ministry of National Defense (MND-GSH), a military correspondent, and three crew members. Shen and seven others including two Major Generals were killed, while five others were injured.

== Victims ==
Eight military servicemembers were killed and 5 were wounded.

== Investigation ==
During a news conference on 2 January, General Hsiung Hou-chi, Commanding General of the Air Force, stated that the government had set up a task force to investigate the cause of the accident. The flight recorders of the aircraft were recovered on 3 January and sent to the Taiwan Transportation Safety Board. Proprietary hardware within the flight recorders were delivered to Sikorsky Aircraft.

On 21 July 2020, the Control Yuan announced that Jen I-wei and Chou Shih-kai, both of whom were posted to the Air Force Weather Wing's No. 8 Base at the time of the accident, had been impeached. It was reported in January 2022 that the Judicial Yuan's Disciplinary Court had barred Jen from working in the public sector for two years. No penalty was issued to Chou, due to insufficient evidence against him.

== Aftermath ==
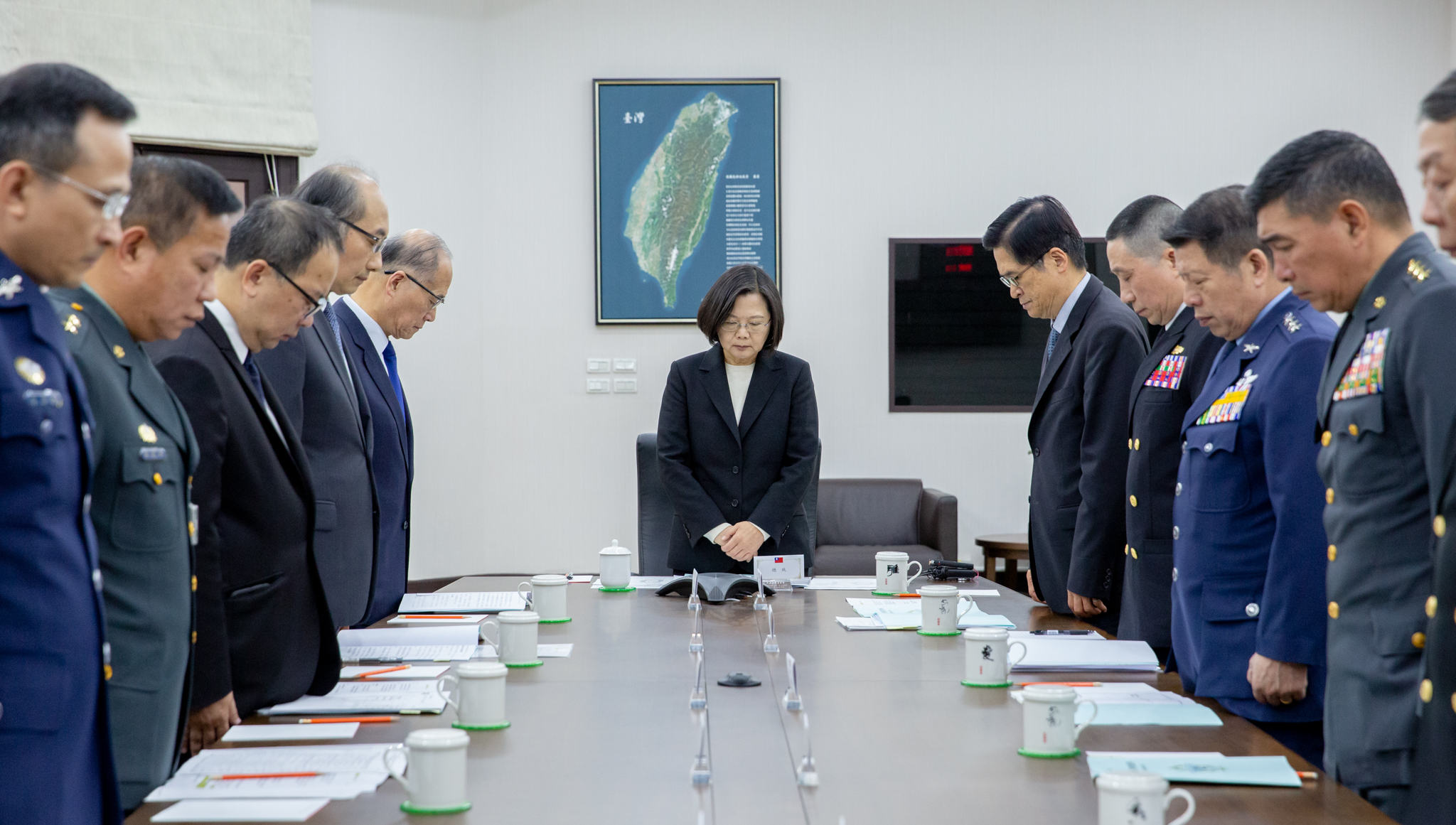
President Tsai Ing-wen, along with Generals and Admirals, participated in a moment of silence on the military conference after the helicopter accident

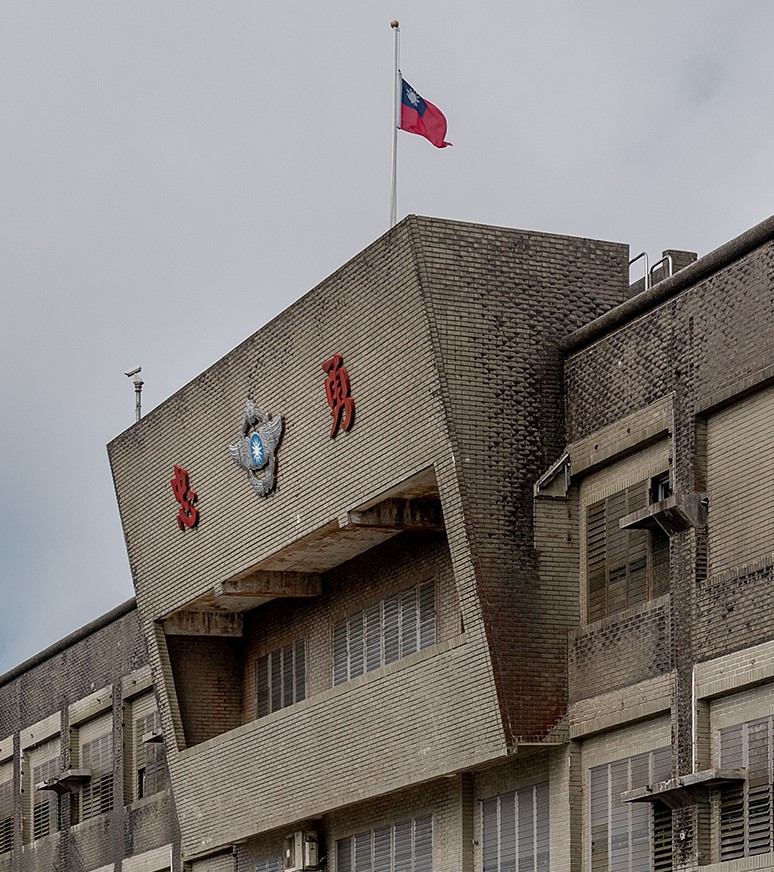
National flag at Dong'aoling Radar Station, scheduled destination of the flight, lowered to half-staff on 4 January in condolence of the accident

This accident occurred nine days before the Taiwanese general election. President Tsai Ing-wen's campaign office and Democratic Progressive Party announced that their presidential and legislative campaign activities would be stopped for three days, and Han Kuo-yu's presidential campaign office said that Han would cancel campaign events for two days.

=== Reactions ===
==== United States ====
General Mark A. Milley, Chairman of the United States Joint Chiefs of Staff, issued a statement to express condolences to members of the Taiwan military on the death of General Shen and the seven other deceased on behalf of the U.S. military. The American Institute in Taiwan (AIT), the U.S. representative mission on the island, also issued a statement to extend condolences on the accident, and that it stands ready to assist their Taiwan counterparts in the aftermath. On 3 January, the flag of the United States at AIT Taipei Main Office flew at half-staff.

==== Japan ====
The Japan-Taiwan Exchange Association stated that "they were shocked and grief-stricken at the unfortunate deaths of the eight personnel, including Chief of Staff General Shen Yiming and would be mourned for their valor and service to their nation. At the same time also wishing the five remaining surviving personnel a speedy and healthy recovery."

==== Other countries ====
Australian Office in Taipei, German Institute Taipei, British Office Taipei, Polish Office in Taipei, along with other foreign missions in Taiwan, as well as Haitian President Jovenel Moïse, Paraguayan Minister of Defense Bernardino Soto Estigarribia and San Christopher and Nevis Minister of Foreign Affairs Mark Brantley and other senior foreign government officials have also expressed their condolences on Facebook or Twitter.

== See also ==
- List of military accidents in Taiwan
