= National Defense University (Republic of China) =

Military university in Taiwan

Coordinates: 24°56′03.2″N 121°18′24.4″E

- 國防大學
- Type: Military academy
- Established: May 2000
- President: Liu Chih-pin
- Vice-president: Army Lt. Gen. Chang Chieh
- Provost: Army Maj. Gen. Lo Ying-yang (羅籝洋)
- Location: Bade, Taoyuan, Taiwan
- Website: Official website (in English)

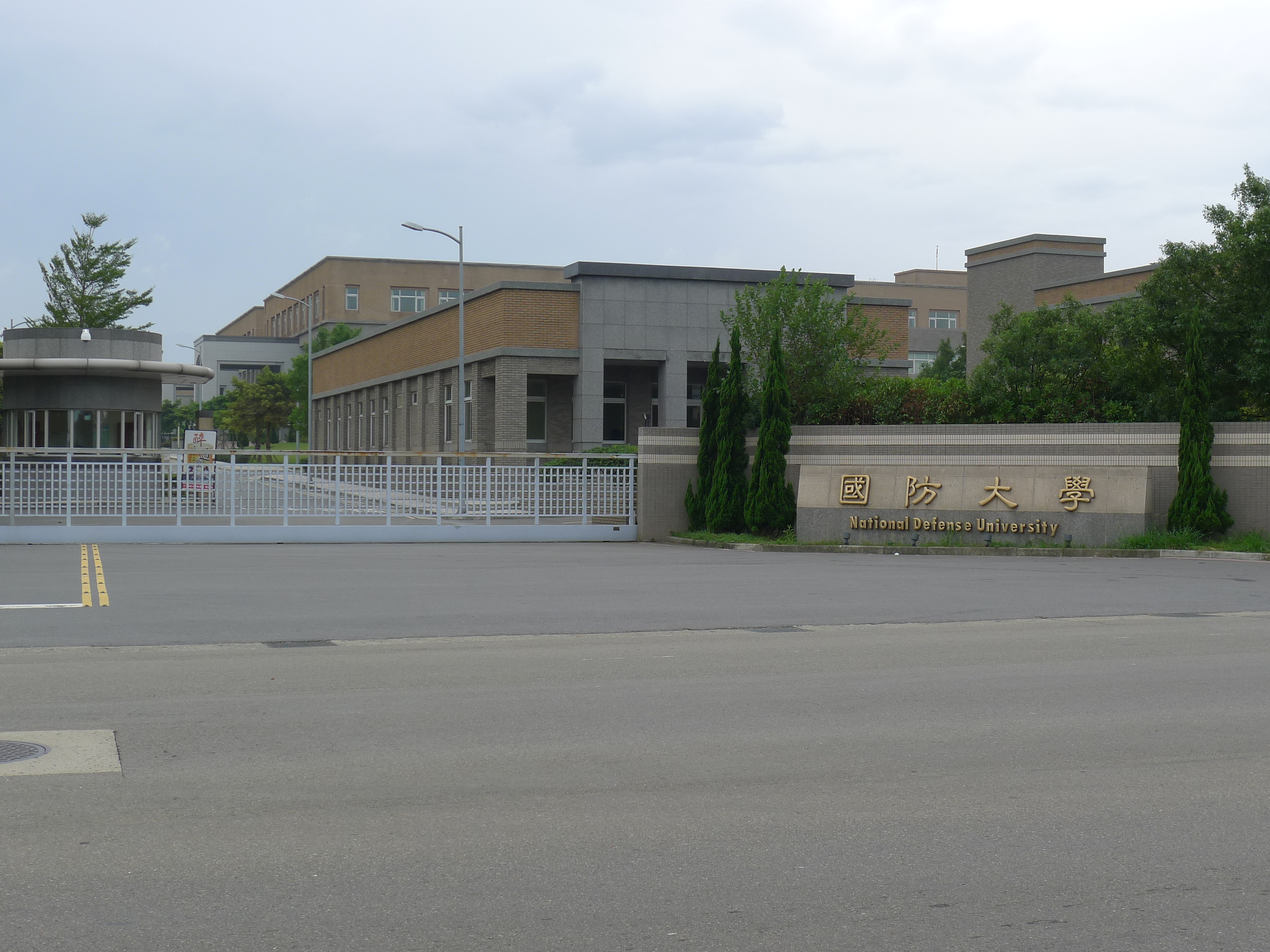
The side gate of National Defense University on Shingfeng Road.

Flag of ROC Tri-service University (1968–2000)

Flag of ROC National Defense University

National Defense University (NDU; Chinese: 國防大學; pinyin: Guófáng Dàxué; Pe̍h-ōe-jī: Kok-hông Tāi-ha̍k) is a military academy located in Bade District, Taoyuan City, Taiwan.

The NDU offers a wide range of academic programs, including undergraduate, graduate, and doctoral programs. The undergraduate program is the Military Academy, which provides four-year undergraduate education and training to prepare cadets for leadership roles in the military.

== History ==
The university was established in May 2000 by merging Armed Forces University, National Defense Management College, Chung Cheng Institute of Technology, and National Defense Medical Center.

== Colleges ==
- War College
- Army Command and Staff College
- Naval Command and Staff College
- Air Command and Staff College
- Political Warfare College
- Management College
- Institute of Technology ( CCIT, NDU )

== List of presidents ==
=== Armed Forces University ===
- Pi Tsung-gan (August 1959 – August 1964)
- Yu Po-chuan (16 August 1968 – 1 December 1969)
- Chiang Wei-kuo (16 August 1975 – 6 April 1980)
- Wang Tuo-nien (7 April 1980 – 31 December 1983)
- Yen Pai-chien (1 January 1984 – 30 April 1987)
- Luo Ben-li (1 May 1987 – 4 December 1989)
- Wang Tuo-chih (5 December 1989 – 30 April 1992)
- Yeh Chang-tung 葉昌桐 (1 May 1992 – 30 April 1994)
- Cheng Bang-chih (1 May 1994 – 30 June 1996)
- Lee Chen-lin (1 July 1996 – 31 January 1999)
- Hsia Ying-chou (1 February 1999 – 7 May 2000)

=== National Defense University ===
- Hsia Ying-chou (8 May 2000 – 31 January 2002)
- Chen Chen-hsiang (1 February 2002 – 31 August 2003)
- Hsieh Chien-tung (1 September 2003 – 31 May 2005)
- Fei Hung-po 費鴻波 (1 June 2005 – 15 February 2006)
- Tseng Jing-ling (16 February 2006 – 31 October 2008)
- Chin Nai-chieh 1 November 2008 – 15 May 2011)
- Adm. Chen Yeong-kang (16 May 2011 – 31 August 2012)
- Gen. Chiu Kuo-cheng (1 September 2012 – 31 July 2014)
- Cheng Te-mei (1 August 2014 – 31 October 2015)
- Wu Wan-chiao (1 November 2015 – 31 March 2019)
- Wang Shin-lung (1 April 2019 – 30 June 2021)
- Chang Che-ping (since 1 July 2021)
- Liu Chih-pin (since 16 June 2022)

== Transportation ==
The university is accessible South West from Yingge Station of Taiwan Railway.

== Notable alumni ==
- Chen Chao-min, Minister of National Defense (2008–2009)
- Feng Shih-kuan, Minister of National Defense (2016–2018)
- Lee Shying-jow, Minister of Veterans Affairs Council (2016–2018)
- Sanaullah Khan Niazi, Pakistani Major General (2012–2013)
- Tseng Jing-ling, Minister of Veterans Affairs Council (2009–2013)
- Yang Kuo-chiang, Director-General of the National Security Bureau (2015–2016)

== See also ==
- List of universities in Taiwan
