= Republic of China Armed Forces rank insignia =

The Military ranks of the Republic of China are the ranks used by the Republic of China Armed Forces. (Note: Colloquially known as the Taiwanese Armed Forces to distinguish from the People's Liberation Army (PLA) of the People's Republic of China (PRC).) The official military rank names in Traditional Chinese are identical across all different military branches, but their English translations may be different.

== Commissioned officer ranks ==
The rank insignia of commissioned officers.

Rank group	General/flag officers				Field/senior officers			Junior officers
Rank	一級上將	二級上將	中將	少將	上校	中校	少校	上尉	中尉	少尉
Mandarin	Yījí Shàngjiàng	Èrjí Shàngjiàng	Zhōngjiàng	Shaojiàng	Shàngxiào	Zhōngxiào	Shàoxiào	Shàngwèi	Zhōngwèi	Shàowèi
Taiwanese Hokkien	It-kip Siōng-chiòng	Jī-kip Siōng-chiòng	Tiong-chiòng	Siáu-chiòng	Siōng-hāu	Tiong-hāu	Siáu-hāu	Siōng-ùi	Tiong-ùi	Siáu-ùi
Hakka	Yit-khi̍p Song-chiông	Ngi-khi̍p Song-chiông	Chûng-chiông	Seu-chiông	Song-káu	Chûng-káu	Seu-káu	Song-ví	Chûng-ví	Seu-ví
Literal translation	First class upper leader	Second class upper leader	Middle leader	Junior leader	Upper field officer	Middle field officer	Junior field officer	Upper officer	Middle officer	Junior officer
Republic of China Army
Translation	Full general	General	Lieutenant general	Major general	Colonel	Lieutenant colonel	Major	Captain	Lieutenant	Second lieutenant
ROC Military Police
Translation			Lieutenant general	Major general	Colonel	Lieutenant colonel	Major	Captain	Lieutenant	Second lieutenant
ROC Navy
Translation	Full admiral	Admiral	Vice admiral	Rear admiral	Captain	Commander	Lieutenant commander	Lieutenant	Lieutenant (junior grade)	Ensign
ROC Marine Corps
Translation		General	Lieutenant general	Major general	Colonel	Lieutenant colonel	Major	Captain	Lieutenant	Second lieutenant
ROC Air Force
Translation	Full general	General	Lieutenant general	Major general	Colonel	Lieutenant colonel	Major	Captain	Lieutenant	Second lieutenant
Rank group	General/flag officers				Field/senior officers			Junior officers

== Other ranks ==
The rank insignia of non-commissioned officers and enlisted personnel.

Rank group	Non-commissioned officers						Enlisted personnel
Rank	一等士官長	二等士官長	三等士官長	上士	中士	下士	上等兵	一等兵	二等兵
Mandarin	Yīděng Shìguānzhǎng	Èrděng Shìguānzhǎng	Sānděng Shìguānzhǎng	Shàngshi	Zhōngshi	Xiàshi	Shàngděng Bīng	Yīděng Bīng	Èrděng Bīng
Taiwanese	It-téng Sū-koaⁿ-tiúⁿ	Jī-téng Sū-koaⁿ-tiúⁿ	Sàm-téng Sū-koaⁿ-tiúⁿ	Siōng-sū	Tiong-sū	Hā-sū	Siōng-téng Peng	It-téng Peng	Jī-téng Peng
Hakka	Yit-tén Sṳ-kôn-chóng	Ngi-tén Sṳ-kôn-chóng	Sâm-tén Sṳ-kôn-chóng	Song-sṳ	Chûng-sṳ	Ha-sṳ	Song-tén Pîn	Yit-tén Pîn	Ngi-tén Pîn
Literal translation	First class warrior commander	Second class warrior commander	Third class warrior commander	Upper warrior	Middle warrior	Lower warrior	Upper class soldier	First class soldier	Second class soldier
Translation	First class master sergeant	Second class master sergeant	Third class master sergeant	Sergeant	Staff sergeant	Corporal	Private upper class	Private first class	Private
Republic of China Army
ROC Military Police
ROC Navy
ROC Marine Corps
ROC Air Force

== Historic ranks ==
After the government of the Republic of China relocated to Taiwan in December 1949, the military rank system had a large reform in 1956. As a result, the contemporary rank structure is closer to the one used by the United States Armed Forces.

=== Officer rank ===
Rank group	General / flag officers						Senior officers			Junior officers
Rank	特級上將	一級上將	二級上將	中將	少將	代將	上校	中校	少校	上尉	中尉	少尉
Mandarin	Tèjí shàngjiàng	Yījí shàngjiàng	Èrjí shàngjiàng	Zhōngjiàng	Shàojiàng	Dàijiāng	Shàngxiào	Zhōngxiào	Shàoxiào	Shàngwèi	Zhōngwèi	Shàowèi
1958–1980
1980–2000	Abolished

=== Other ranks ===
Rank group	Non-commissioned officers			Soldiers
Rank	上士	中士	下士	上等兵	一等兵	二等兵
Mandarin	Shàng shì	Zhōng shì	Xiàshì	Shàngděngbīng	Yīděngbīng	Èrděngbīng
1958–1980

== See also ==
- Ministry of National Defense (Republic of China)
