= Order of Loyalty and Diligence =

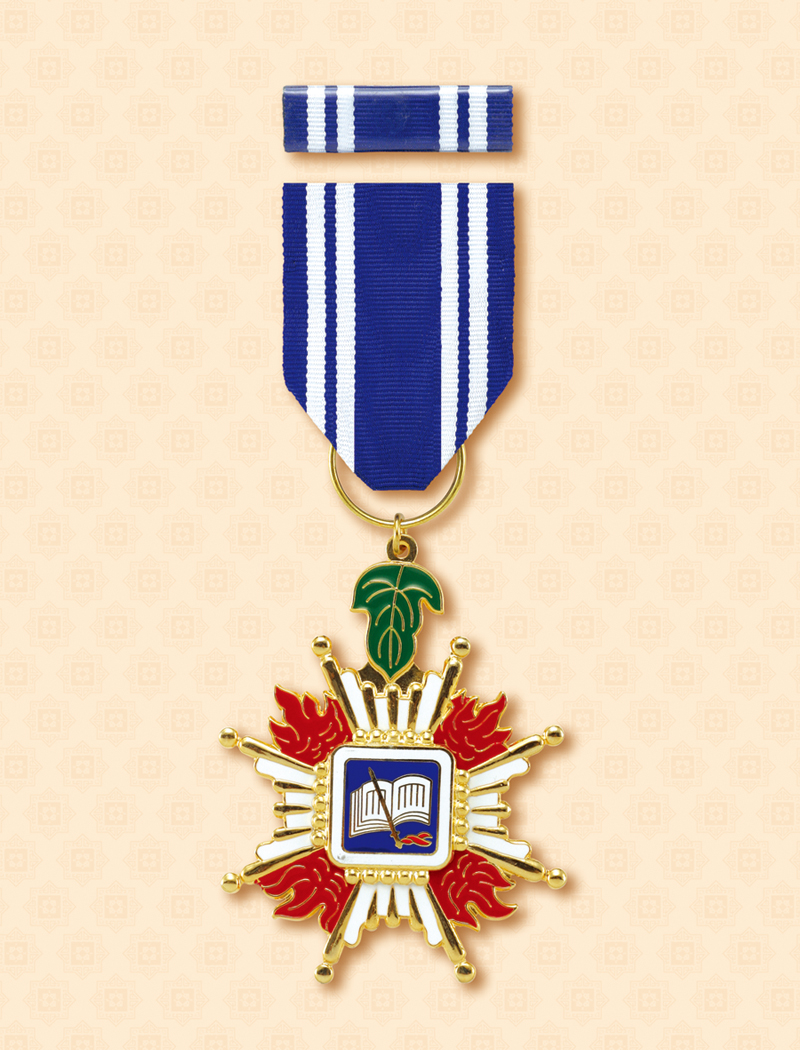
- Awarded for: Contributions to national security or quelling internal unrest
- Country: Republic of China
- Presented by: President of the Republic of China (Taiwan)
- Eligibility: Contributes 10 years' service in the military and meeting academic criteria
- Status: Currently awarded
- Established: 23 September 1944

Precedence
- Next (higher): Order of Loyalty and Valour

Order of Loyalty and Diligence (Traditional Chinese:忠勤勳章) is a military award from the Republic of China. It was created on 23 September 1944 for persons who contribute 10 years of service in the military and meet academic criteria.
