= Chen Yeong-kang =

Taiwanese politician and retired admiral

- 陳永康
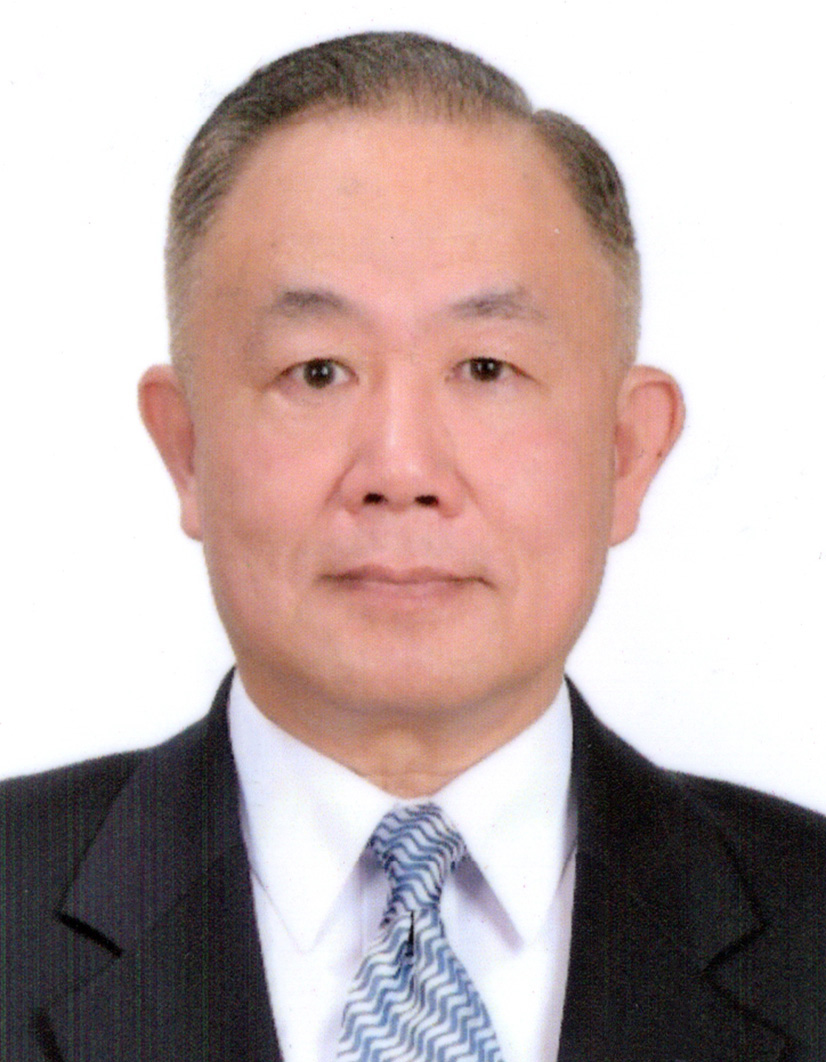

Member of the Legislative Yuan
- Incumbent
- Assumed office 1 February 2024
- Constituency: Party-list

9th Policy Vice Minister of National Defense
- In office 4 March 2015 – 19 May 2016
- Minister: Kao Kuang-chi
- Preceded by: Andrew Hsia
- Succeeded by: Lee Hsi-ming

5th Commander of the ROC Navy
- In office 1 August 2013 – 30 January 2015
- President: Ma Ying-jeou
- Preceded by: Tung Hsiang-lung
- Succeeded by: Lee Hsi-ming

27th Executive Vice Chief of the General Staff of the ROC Armed Forces
- In office 1 September 2012 – 31 July 2013
- Chief: Lin Chen-yi; Yen Ming
- Preceded by: Kao Kuang-chi
- Succeeded by: Yen Teh-fa

Personal details
- Born: 1951 (age 74–75) Taipei, Taiwan
- Party: Kuomintang (since 2023)
- Education: Republic of China Naval Academy (BS); United States Naval War College (MS)

Military service
- Allegiance: Republic of China
- Branch/service: Republic of China Navy
- Years of service: 1974–2015
- Rank: Admiral
- Battles/wars: Third Taiwan Strait Crisis

Chen Yeong-kang (traditional Chinese: 陳永康; simplified Chinese: 陈永康; pinyin: Chén Yǒngkāng), also known as Richard Y. K. Chen, is a Taiwanese politician and retired admiral. Since 2024, he has been a member of the Legislative Yuan from the Kuomintang. He served as the commander of the Republic of China Navy from 2013 to 2015, and as the vice minister of national defense for policy from 2015 to 2016.

He graduated from the Republic of China Naval Academy in 1974 and spent over forty years in military service. Chen finished his career as the commander of the Navy. In that role he launched programs to modernize and expand Taiwan's shipbuilding industry, which led to the construction of its first indigenous submarine, the Hai Kun-class. After leaving the military he was briefly the vice minister of national defense for policy, the top civilian advisor to the minister, and later worked for a defense research institute.

== Early life and education ==
Chen was born on 20 April 1951 in Taipei, Taiwan. Both of his parents were university professors, and his siblings were educated abroad. Chen developed an interest in painting during childhood and studied under the watercolor painter Ma Pai-shui.

Unlike his siblings, Chen decided to pursue a military career and began his military education at the age of 16. He enrolled at the Naval Officers Preparatory School (海軍軍官預備學校), which was later incorporated into the Chung Cheng Armed Forces Preparatory School.

Chen graduated from the Republic of China Naval Academy in 1974. Among his classmates was Tung Hsiang-lung, who later became a commander in the Republic of China Navy. Following his graduation, Chen served as a junior naval surface warfare officer before taking on successive ship and unit command assignments.

Chen continued his military education at the Naval Command and Staff College of the Armed Forces University, graduating as a member of its 1986 class. He later attended the Naval War College in the United States, graduating in 1997.

== Military career ==
His assignments in the Republic of China Navy have included as commander of the 168th Fleet, director of operations and intelligence at Navy Command, general director of the office of the Minister of Defense, director of the department of integrated assessment at the Ministry of Defense, and chief of staff and deputy commander of Navy Command. He was also the head of the ROC Defense Mission to the United States, and later president of the National Defense University from 2011 to 2012. Chen became the Executive Vice Chief of the General Staff of the Republic of China Armed Forces in August 2012.

=== Commander of the Navy ===
He was the commander of the Republic of China Navy (ROCN) from 1 August 2013, succeeding Admiral Tung Hsiang-lung. As commander, Chen was credited for launching shipbuilding modernization initiatives, including the advancement of proposals for Taiwan's Indigenous Defense Submarine (IDS). In January 2014, Chen released the Forces Structure and Planning Concepts for the Future ROCN, which called for extending the service life of Taiwan's existing submarines, so that Taiwanese industry could gain experience in submarine construction. The ROCN also would invest US$450 million in the China Shipbuilding Corporation and the Ship and Ocean Industries R&D Center.

The IDS program, launched in April 2014, led to the construction of the Hai Kun-class starting from 2020. Chen formed a team to study submarine design and procurement, and in April 2014 he got the U.S. chief of naval operations, Admiral Jonathan Greenert, to publicly acknowledge U.S.-Taiwan dialogue on the IDS, to remove political opposition to the program. A seminar on the IDS was held with international experts in November 2014, after which the Navy requested a submarine with a displacement of up to 2,000 tons, to be completed in 2024. He also introduced the National Shipbuilding Program, with projects for multiple types of warships, which were constructed in later years.

Chen relinquished command to Admiral Lee Hsi-ming on 31 January 2015, and retired after over 40 years of service in the Republic of China Navy.

== Post-service life ==
He became the Deputy Minister of National Defense (Policy) on 3 March 2015, making him the top civilian advisor to the minister. On 17 March 2015, in an interview with Proceedings magazine of the United States Naval Institute, he stated that the ROCN had a "3A plan," meaning "affordable, applicable and accountable."

After leaving the government, he became a board member of Taiwan's top defense research institute. In November 2017, the Ministry of National Defense punished Chen and several other officers for awarding a contract to a financially troubled shipbuilding company that was allegedly involved in a loan fraud scandal. On 1 February 2019, Chen and other officials were impeached by the Control Yuan after a year-long investigation into a contract for six minesweepers on terms that gave undue financial benefit for the shipbuilder, in violation of government procurement regulations.

=== Member of parliament ===
Chen Yeong-kang became a member of the Legislative Yuan on the party list of the Kuomintang (KMT) from 1 February 2024. He is a member of the Foreign Affairs and National Defense Committee. As a legislator, he has attempted to expand the Legislative Yuan's control over a number of security powers that belong to the Executive Yuan, which is control by the Democratic Progressive Party.
