= Li Ming-kao =

Li Ming-kao (Chinese: 李鳴皋; born 22 November 1932) is a Taiwanese naval officer and politician.

Li graduated from the Republic of China Naval Academy and Armed Forces University and assumed a succession of leadership positions in the Republic of China Navy. Between 1993 and 2002, he was elected to the Legislative Yuan via proportional representation party list as a representative of the Kuomintang.
