= Pu Tze-chun =

Taiwanese admiral

- 蒲澤春
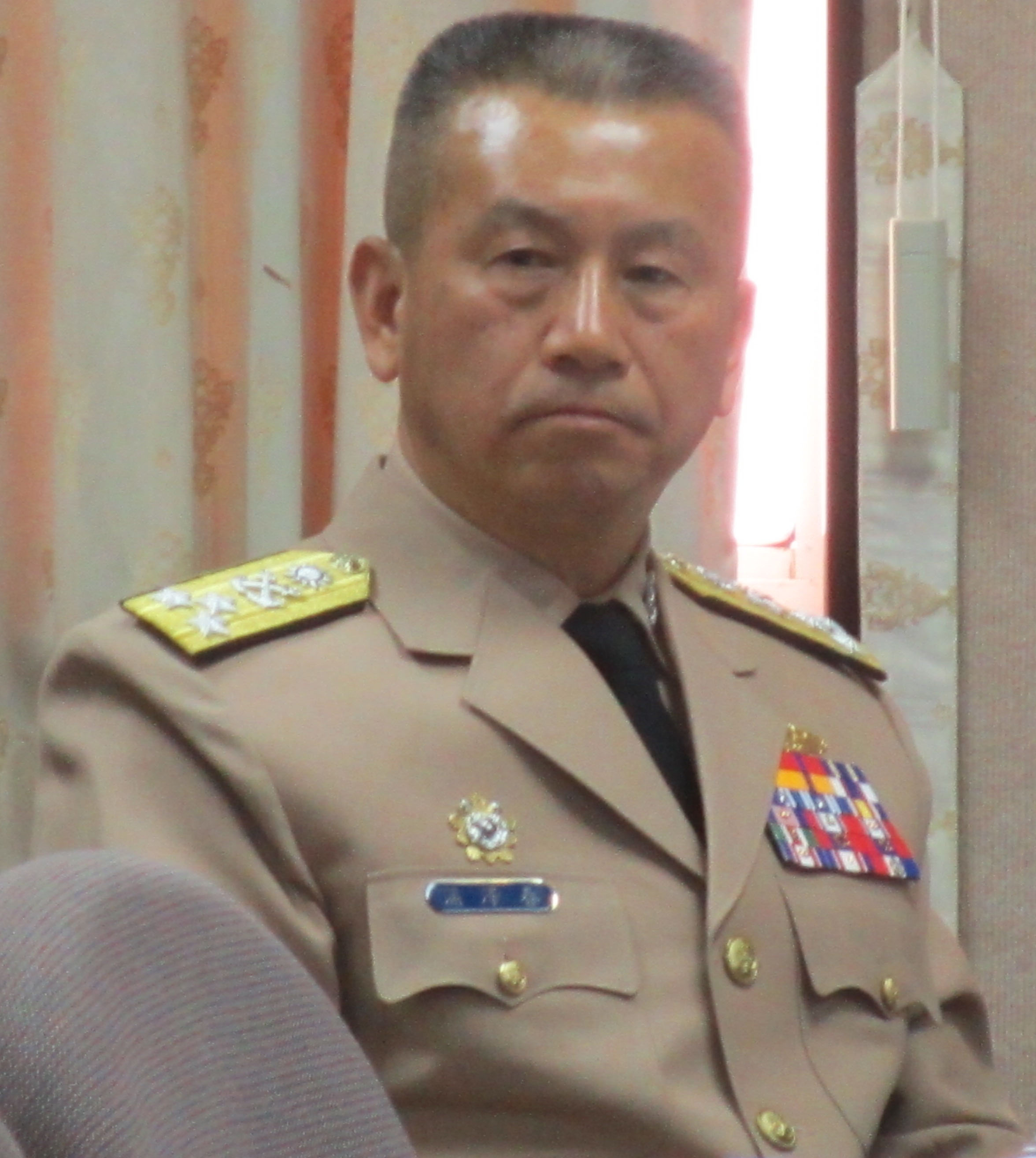

Vice Minister (Policy) of National Defense of the Republic of China
- In office 1 May 2017 – 28 February 2018
- Preceded by: Lee Hsi-ming
- Succeeded by: Shen Yi-ming

30th Vice Chief (Executive) of the General Staff of the Republic of China Armed Forces
- In office 30 January 2015 – 30 April 2017
- Chief: Yen Teh-fa; Chiu Kuo-cheng
- Preceded by: Liao Jung-hsin
- Succeeded by: Chen Pao-yu

Personal details
- Born: 7 July 1956 (age 69) Yangmei, Taoyuan County, Taiwan
- Education: Republic of China Naval Academy (BA); Naval War College (MS); I-Shou University (PhD)

Military service
- Allegiance: Republic of China
- Branch/service: Republic of China Navy
- Years of service: 1978–2020
- Rank: Admiral

Pu Tze-chun (Chinese: 蒲澤春; pinyin: Pú Zéchūn) is a Taiwanese military official and a former admiral of the Republic of China Navy (ROCN) in Taiwan. He was the 11th Vice Minister of National Defense, he took office in May 2017. He stepped down in February 2018.

== Education ==
Pu graduated from the Republic of China Naval Academy in 1978 and earned a master's degree from the Naval War College in the United States in 1997. In 2020, he earned a Ph.D. in industrial management from I-Shou University. His doctoral dissertation was titled, "A study on the innovative project management model for the purchase of decommissioned warships from the US Navy" (Chinese: 自美海軍籌購除役軍艦專案管理創新模式之研究-以基隆級飛彈驅逐艦為例).

== Republic of China Armed Forces ==
Speaking at Legislative Yuan as the Vice Chief of the General Staff (Executive) of the Republic of China Armed Forces in October 2015 regarding South China Sea territorial disputes, Pu said that the armed forces would defend the nation and also appeal to the international community.
