= Lee Hsi-min =

Taiwanese admiral (born 1955)

- 李喜明
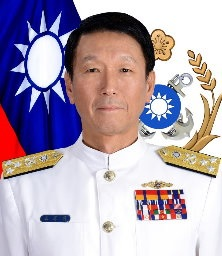

10th Deputy Minister (Policy) of National Defense of the Republic of China
- In office 1 June 2016 – 30 April 2017
- Minister: Feng Shih-kuan
- Preceded by: Chen Yeong-kang
- Succeeded by: Pu Tze-chun

Personal details
- Born: 24 June 1955 (age 71)
- Education: Republic of China Naval Academy (BS); National Defense University; United States Naval War College

Military service
- Allegiance: Taiwan
- Branch: Republic of China Navy
- Years of service: 1977–2019
- Rank: Admiral
- Commands: Chief of the General Staff; Commander of the Navy; ROCS Haihu
- Battles/wars: Third Taiwan Strait Crisis

Lee Hsi-min (or Hsi-min, Chinese: 李喜明; pinyin: Lǐ Xǐmíng; Wade–Giles: Li Hsi-ming; born 24 June 1955) is a retired Taiwanese admiral who was the Chief of the General Staff of the Republic of China Armed Forces from 2017 to 2019. He is currently an adjunct professor at National Chengchi University and a non-resident senior research fellow of the Institute for Indo-Pacific Security. He was previously also Taiwan's vice minister of national defense for policy from 2016 to 2017 and the commander of the Republic of China Navy from 2015 to 2016.

Lee was commissioned from the Republic of China Naval Academy in 1977 and became a career submarine officer. During the 1990s he was the commander of one of the Chien Lung-class submarines that Taiwan had received from the Netherlands. Lee was deployed during the Third Taiwan Strait Crisis in 1996 for potential action against the People's Liberation Army Navy. As Chief of the General Staff during the presidency of Tsai Ing-wen, he became known for introducing the Overall Defense Concept (ODC) as a plan to the reform the armed forces to counter the People's Liberation Army through asymmetric warfare. Since his retirement from the military, Lee has continued to advocate for the reform and strengthening of Taiwan's defenses.

== Early life and education ==
Lee Hsi-ming was born on 24 June 1955. He was commissioned from the Republic of China Naval Academy in 1977. He later graduated from the Naval Command and Staff College of Taiwan's National Defense University in 1992, and graduated from the United States Naval War College in 1998 by correspondence.

== Military career ==
Lee became a submarine officer in the Republic of China Navy. He was among the first Taiwanese personnel to coordinate the transfer of Chien Lung-class (Zwaardvis) submarines from the Netherlands, going there to receive them. After returning with one of the new boats, ROCS Haihu, Lee also oversaw the operation of new training equipment for the Taiwanese crew to become familiar with submarine handling. After establishing an advanced submarine personnel training system, he became a submarine operations officer and captain. While he was the commanding officer of Haihu from 1995 to 1997, he and his crew were deployed to prepare for the potential encounter with the People's Liberation Army Navy during the Third Taiwan Strait Crisis in 1996. Under a secret order from then-Chief of the General Staff Luo Ben-li, they spent a month waiting for the Chinese fleet in an ambush position, loaded with torpedoes.

In January 2015 Lee Hsi-min became the commander of the Republic of China Navy, and was its third commander to have submarine experience. His background in submarines was interpreted as being important because of Taiwan's goal to develop its own indigenous submarine around that time. In 2016, he became the Vice Minister of National Defense (Policy), and was the first commissioned officer to hold the position.

=== Chief of the General Staff ===
Lee was appointed the Chief of the General Staff of the Republic of China Armed Forces in April 2017 by President Tsai Ing-wen. As the CGS, Lee became known for introducing the Overall Defense Concept (ODC) in 2018, which called for reforming Taiwan's military to use asymmetric warfare to counter the increasing capabilities of the People's Liberation Army. This meant moving away from the traditional Taiwanese force structure and platforms, such as fighter jets or large surface ships, in favor of unmanned vehicles, mobile air defense, and anti-ship missiles. The Tsai Ing-wen administration fully committed itself to the strategy by late 2019. In December 2018 he started a program of building up to 60 small missile boats armed with anti-ship missiles, which was worth about US$1.1 billion.

Lee coordinated the policy of carrying out the Overall Defense Concept and improving military exercises and the preparedness of joint operations. In June 2019, Lee was awarded the Order of the Cloud and Banner with Special Grand Cordon for his contributions to national defense. Lee retired on 1 July 2019, after 42 years of service in the Republic of China Navy. Although the ODC was initially embraced by the Tsai Ing-wen administration and also received approval from the United States, it was later abandoned in the early 2020s, partially for political reasons, and because Taiwan's military establishment favors its traditional doctrine. After Lee retired, the military reportedly banned the term from even being used among senior officers. In August 2021, Lee's missile boat program was cancelled, officially because the Navy considered it to have a poor design, but reportedly also because it was opposed by one of his successors, Admiral Huang Shu-kuang. The 2021 and 2023 National Defense Reports affirmed that the country's military strategy is not being guided by the ODC.

== Post-service career ==
After he retired from the post of Chief of the General Staff in 2019, Lee has advocated for an asymmetric strategy for Taiwan such as the Overall Defense Concept (ODC), to the general public. One of the examples is in his book, The Overall Defense Concept: An Asymmetric Approach to Taiwan's Defense (臺灣的勝算：以小制大的不對稱戰略，全臺灣人都應了解的整體防衛構想), written in 2022. In 2025 an updated and abridged version, translated into English, was published under the title Defending Our Island Home.

He became a non-resident senior research fellow at the Institute for Indo-Pacific Security, formerly the Project 2049 Institute, in the United States. Since August 2022, he has been an adjunct professor in the PhD program at National Chengchi University, specializing in Asia-Pacific security and Taiwan's defense.

== Personal life ==
Lee is married.

== Honors ==
Taiwan:

- Order of the Cloud and Banner, Special Grand Cordon (2019)

== Works ==
- 2009, "如何正確運用電腦兵棋系統". Navy Professional Journal (海軍學術雙月刊), 43(5), 38-42.
- 2020, "Taiwan’s Overall Defense Concept, Explained." The Diplomat.
- 2021, "The threat of China invading Taiwan is growing every day. What the U.S. can do to stop it." NBC News.
- 2021, Taiwan's Overall Defense Concept: Theory and the Practice. Hoover Institute, Stanford University, California, United States.
- 2022, "Xi Jinping may attack Taiwan to secure his legacy, warn Admiral Lee Hsi-min and Eric Lee." The Economist.
- 臺灣的勝算：以小制大的不對稱戰略，全臺灣人都應了解的整體防衛構想 [The overall defense concept: an asymmetric approach to Taiwan's defense] (in Chinese). Taiwan: 聯經出版. 2022. ISBN 9789570864878.
- 2023, "Taiwan Must Make Up for Lost Time." Foreign Policy.
- Defending Our Island Home: An Asymmetric Approach to Taiwan's Defense (2025)

== See also ==
- Grey-zone (international relations)

Military offices
Preceded by Chen Yeong-kang	Commander of the Republic of China Navy; 2015–2016	Succeeded by Huang Shu-kuang
Preceded by Chiu Kuo-cheng	Chief of the General Staff of the Republic of China Armed Forces; 2017–2019	Succeeded by Shen Yi-ming
Political offices
Preceded by Chen Yeong-kang	Vice Minister of National Defense (Policy) of the Republic of China; 2016–2017	Succeeded by Pu Tze-chun
