= Republic of China Armed Forces =

Military forces of Taiwan

- Seal of the Ministry of National Defense of the Republic of China
- Founded: 16 June 1924; 102 years ago (as National Revolutionary Army)
- Current form: 25 December 1947; 78 years ago (as current service)
- Service branches: Army; Navy; Marine Corps; Air Force; Military Police
- Headquarters: Ministry of Defense Building, Zhongshan District, Taipei
- Website: Chinese; English

Leadership
- Commander-in-Chief: President Lai Ching-te
- Minister of National Defense: Wellington Koo
- Chief of the General Staff: Admiral Mei Chia-shu

Personnel
- Military age: 18
- Conscription: 1 year
- Active personnel: 230,000 (2026)
- Reserve personnel: 1,657,000 (2026)

Expenditure
- Budget: US$20.1billion (2026)

Industry
- Domestic suppliers: NCSIST; AIDC; CSBC; Jong Shyn Shipbuilding Company; Lungteh Shipbuilding
- Foreign suppliers: France; United States

Related articles
- History: List of wars involving the Republic of China; Counterattack the mainland (1949–1970); First Taiwan Strait Crisis (1955); Second Taiwan Strait Crisis (1958); Vietnam War (1965–1973); Cambodian Civil War (1970–1975); NDF Rebellion (1978–1982; Peace Bell Program); Third Taiwan Strait Crisis (1995–1996); Fourth Taiwan Strait Crisis (2022–present)
- Ranks: Military ranks

Republic of China Armed Forces
- Traditional Chinese: 中華民國國軍
- Simplified Chinese: 中华民国国军
- Literal meaning: Republic of China National Military
Transcriptions
Standard Mandarin
- Hanyu Pinyin: Zhōnghuá Mínguó Guójūn
- Bopomofo: ㄓㄨㄥ ㄏㄨㄚˊ ㄇㄧㄣˊ ㄍㄨㄛˊ ㄍㄨㄛˊ ㄐㄩㄣ
- Wade–Giles: Chung^{1}-Hua^{2} Min^{2}-Kuo^{2} Kuo^{2}-Chün^{1}
- Tongyong Pinyin: Jhōnghuá Mínguó Guójyūn
- IPA: [ʈʂʊ́ŋkwǎ mǐnkwǒ kwǒtɕýn]
other Mandarin
- Xiao'erjing: ژْوڭخُوَا مِنْقُوَ قُوَجُنْ
Hakka
- Romanization: Chûng-fà Mìn-koet Koet-kiûn
Southern Min
- Hokkien POJ: Tiong-hôa Bîn-kok Kok-kun

Shorter name: National Army
- Traditional Chinese: 國軍
- Simplified Chinese: 国军
- Literal meaning: National Military
Transcriptions
Standard Mandarin
- Hanyu Pinyin: Guójūn
- Bopomofo: ㄍㄨㄛˊ ㄐㄩㄣ
- Wade–Giles: Kuo^{2}-Chün^{1}
- Tongyong Pinyin: Guójyūnear
other Mandarin
- Xiao'erjing: قُوَجُنْ
Hakka
- Romanization: Koet-kiûn
Southern Min
- Hokkien POJ: Kok-kun

Former name: National Revolutionary Army
- Traditional Chinese: 國民革命軍
- Simplified Chinese: 国民革命军
- Literal meaning: National Revolutionary Military
Transcriptions
Standard Mandarin
- Hanyu Pinyin: Guómín Gémìng Jūn
- Bopomofo: ㄍㄨㄛˊ ㄇㄧㄣˊ ㄍㄜˊ ㄇㄧㄥˋ ㄐㄩㄣ
- Wade–Giles: Kuo^{2}-Min^{2} Kê^{2}-Ming^{4} Chün^{1}
- Tongyong Pinyin: Guómín Gémìng Jyūn
other Mandarin
- Xiao'erjing: قُوَمِنْ گَمِېڭ جُنْ
Southern Min
- Hokkien POJ: Kok-bîn Kek-bēng Kun

The Republic of China Armed Forces (Chinese: 中華民國國軍; pinyin: Zhōnghuá Mínguó Guójūn; lit. 'Republic of China National Military') are the military forces of the Republic of China (Taiwan), which is now based primarily on Taiwan and surrounding islands, but formerly governed mainland China prior to 1949. The armed forces comprise the Army, Navy (including the Marine Corps), Air Force, and Military Police Force. The military operates under the civilian control of the Ministry of National Defense, a cabinet-level body overseen by the Legislative Yuan.

Formerly known as the National Revolutionary Army (NRA), it was renamed the Republic of China Armed Forces in 1947 due to the implementation of the newly promulgated Constitution of the Republic of China. It was also historically referred to as the Chinese National Armed Forces (CNAF) prior to the establishment of the People's Republic of China in mainland China and the gradual loss of international recognition in the 1970s by the United Nations and many countries, including the ROC's close ally, the United States.

Until the late 1970s, the primary mission of the ROC Armed Forces was to prepare for a counteroffensive aimed at retaking mainland China from the Communists, as exemplified by efforts such as Project National Glory. Following strategic shifts and Taiwan's evolving political landscape, the military's focus turned towards the defence of Taiwan itself against potential invasion by the People's Liberation Army (PLA) of the People's Republic of China (PRC), which continues to be perceived as the principal threat.

The ROC Armed Forces today maintain an approximate active strength of 150,000 personnel, with the capability to mobilise up to 1.67 million reservists in times of national emergency or full-scale war. A significant pool of former conscripts is available, as all able-bodied male citizens of the ROC are required to undertake at least one year of compulsory military service upon reaching the age of 18.

== Etymology ==
The Republic of China Armed Forces is the national military of the ROC. In Taiwan, it is commonly referred to as the National Armed Forces, pronounced Kuo^{2}-Chün^{1} in Mandarin (Chinese: 國軍; Hanyu Pinyin: Guójūn; Tongyong Pinyin: Guójyūn, literally "National Army"). This term is also widely used among overseas Chinese communities supportive of Taiwan or the ROC government. Colloquially, it is also known in mainland China and elsewhere worldwide in an international context as the Taiwanese Armed Forces (台军) to distinguish from the People's Liberation Army (PLA) of the People's Republic of China (PRC).

When the ROC was in power in mainland China, its army was the National Revolutionary Army before being renamed as the Republic of China Armed Forces in 1947 due to the implementation of the Constitution of the Republic of China. Prior to the establishment of the PRC in 1949, the ROC military was also widely referred to internationally as the Nationalist Forces, a term that continued to be used by some countries until the 1970s.

== History ==
=== Mainland era ===
Prior to 1947, the ROC Armed Forces were known as the National Revolutionary Army, which was founded by Sun Yat-sen in Guangdong in 1924. Because the Republic of China was divided by warlords since the 1911 Revolution, he wanted to create a military that would be politically dominated by the Chinese Nationalist Party (the Kuomintang). Sun Yat-sen accepted the help of the Soviet Union in creating a Soviet-style military and party system. As part of this effort, the Whampoa Military Academy was founded on 1 May 1924 with Soviet trainers and equipment. The Whampoa Academy provided politically indoctrinated officers that were loyal to the ideals of the Revolution and the Kuomintang Party. A Political Department was established in the Army, training political officers to maintain the Kuomintang's ideological and civilian control.

The National Revolutionary Army fought in the Northern Expedition from 1926 to 1928 to reunite China under one government for the first time in two decades. It fought in the Second Sino-Japanese War from 1937 to 1945, and then against the Chinese Communist Party in the Chinese Civil War. After the ROC military was defeated by the Communists on the mainland in 1949, the Nationalists evacuated to Taiwan.

=== Cold War ===
The promulgation of the Constitution of the Republic of China in 1947 renamed the National Revolutionary Army to the Republic of China Armed Forces (中華民國國軍). Although the army was theoretically nationalized, it remained effectively a party army of the Kuomintang until the 1990s. The United States began providing military supplies and equipment to the ROC after the Korean War broke out, and in 1951 the U.S. Military Assistance Advisory Group (MAAG) Taiwan was created. The ROC military received extensive support from the United States, with MAAG helping set up dozens of military schools (including each branch having its own staff college and officer academy), providing American vehicles, aircraft, ships, and weapons, and restructuring the ROC Army. In 1957, U.S. Ambassador Karl Rankin described the ROC as having the second largest Asian military allied to the United States. In the late 1950s, the ROC Armed Forces had 600,000 troops, including 375,000 in the Army and 17,000 political officers.

During the First Taiwan Strait Crisis in 1954 and 1955, the People's Liberation Army gained air and naval superiority over the ROC Armed Forces near the Dachen and Yijiangshan islands, forcing the ROC to give them up, after artillery fire from the mainland and attacks by PLA Air Force bombers and PLA Navy PT boats. But the ROC prevented the situation from happening again during the Second Taiwan Strait Crisis in 1958, when its garrison on the Kinmen Islands held out through an artillery barrage, the ROC Air Force shot down many PLAAF jets while losing far less of its own, and the Navy sunk some of their PT boats. The ROC Marine Corps used its amphibious vehicles to deliver supplies to the population of the Kinmen Islands while under artillery fire from the mainland. In the 1960s the ROC sent military personnel to assist South Vietnam during the Vietnam War in non-combat roles.

Up until the late 1980s, the ROC military's objective was to eventually retake the mainland. That strategy changed in the 1990s with the understanding that challenging the PRC's control of the mainland was unrealistic, and instead focused on defending Taiwan and its offshore islands. At first this consisted of both offensive and defensive methods, before becoming focused only on the defensive. To reflect this change, a ten-year restructuring plan for the Armed Forces was proposed in 1993 but it was cancelled in 1995 and replaced by another plan, known as the Armed Forces streamlining program, which was adopted by the government in December 1996. The end of the martial law in Taiwan in 1987 also led to a series of administrative reforms, occurring at the same time as the political changes. These included ending the Kuomintang's political control of the military.

=== Post-Cold War ===
The ROC military bureaucracy was traditionally dominated by the Army, which was primarily an infantry force, until the late 1980s, when more emphasis was placed on the Navy and Air Force. In July 1997, the Armed Forces streamlining program was started, reducing the total number of troops and reorganizing Army divisions into more mobile combined arms brigades. In the late 1980s, the Army had 270,000 personnel, out of a total military of over 500,000. The Army received the biggest reduction in size as part of the military reform. By 2003, the Army was reduced to 199,237 soldiers, while the other services included 56,284 in the Navy (including Marines), 55,170 in the Air Force, 15,015 in the Combined Logistics Command, and 14,168 in the Military Police. The reduction in the number of troops continued during the presidency of Chen Shui-bian from 2000 to 2008. Taiwan's transition to democracy also meant that the Armed Forces had to transition from being the armed wing of the KMT to a modern national military. This was a challenge with change resisted by many officers.

In January 2000, two defence laws were passed, the National Defense Law and the Ministry of National Defense Reorganization Law, which both took effect in March 2002. The laws created the basis for the civilian control and nationalization of the ROC military, by subordinating the General Staff to a civilian Minister of Defense, and created new organizations at the MND to improve strategic planning and armaments procurement. The two defence laws were also passed in part because of a scandal during the 1990s about the ROC Navy's decision to purchase certain French frigates, which involved bribery of senior officials and the death of the officer in charge of navy procurement, and resulted in years of investigations. The effect of the post-1987 military reforms was integrating the military into a democratic political system: before 2000 Taiwan's defence policy was controlled by generals, and since then it has been set by the lawmakers. The military has also been included in the truth and reconciliation process which followed the transition from dictatorship to democracy.

In the 21st century as the PRC vastly increased its defence spending, the Republic of China registered the lowest growth in defence spending of the major Asia-Pacific powers. These cutbacks were felt as vital land based systems were cut in order to afford an upgrade of aging fourth generation jet fighters (needed to respond to the PRC's fifth generation fighter programs). And even the jet fighter upgrades were cut back in areas such as high performance jet engines. The U.S.-China Economic and Security Review Commission found that these defence cuts could jeopardize Taiwan's military preparedness.

By 2008 the ROC military had a total strength of 260,000. In 2013 the ROC Armed Forces had over 240,000 active troops, which was reduced to 215,000 as of 2015, and then to 180,000 by 2023. The International Institute of Strategic Studies reported the active duty personnel of the military in 2023 as 169,000. President Tsai Ing-wen, who took office in 2016, has worked to strengthen the military, including by raising its budget, creating the All-Out Defense Mobilization Agency, and restoring conscription from four months to twelve months. President Lai Ching-te announced a plan in November 2025 to increase Taiwan's annual military spending to T$1.25 trillion (US$39.89 billion) over the next eight years. He also stated that the ROC armed forces will be raised to a high level of combat readiness by 2027. In 2026, the military budget will be greater than 3% of Taiwan's GDP for the first time since 2009.

== Organization ==
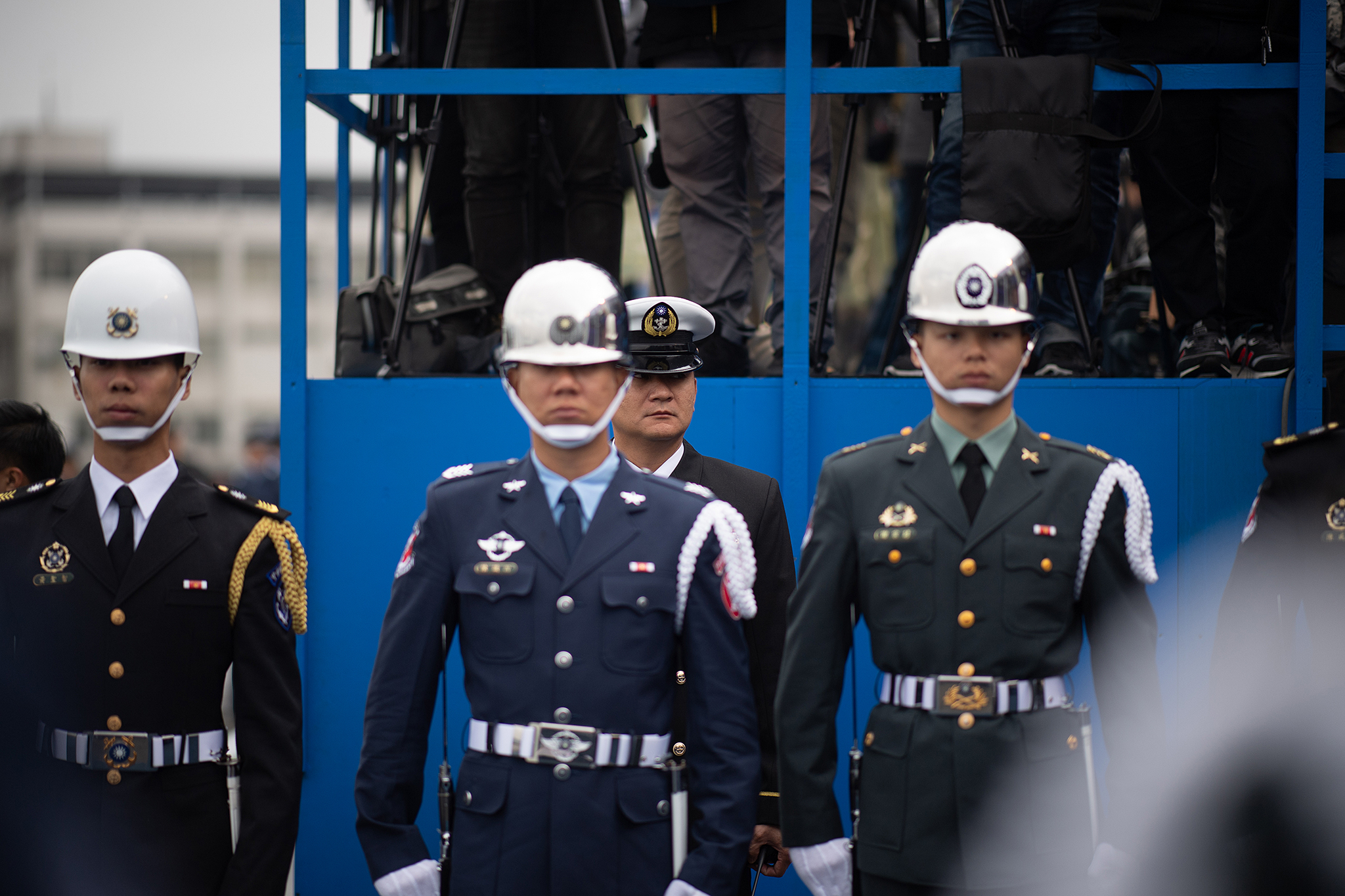
Honor guards of three branches (from the left): Navy, Air Force, and Army.

The professional head of the Armed Forces is the Chief of the General Staff, who answers to the civilian command structure under the Minister of National Defense and the ROC President. Below the Chief are the Executive Vice Chief of the General Staff and two other Vice Chiefs, who oversee the Political Warfare Department and several Deputy Chiefs of the General Staff, each of whom leads a section (J-1 personnel, J-2 intelligence, J-3 operations, J-4 logistics, and J-5 planning). The headquarters of each individual branch are subordinated to the General Staff.

The following service commands are directly subordinate to the General Staff.

- Republic of China Army (ROCA)
- Republic of China Navy (ROCN)
  - Republic of China Marine Corps (ROCMC)
- Republic of China Air Force (ROCAF)
- Republic of China Military Police (ROCMP)

The Coast Guard Administration was created in 2001 from related police and military units and is administered by the Executive Yuan and may be incorporated as a military branch during times of emergency but for the large part remains in civilian control.

=== Army ===
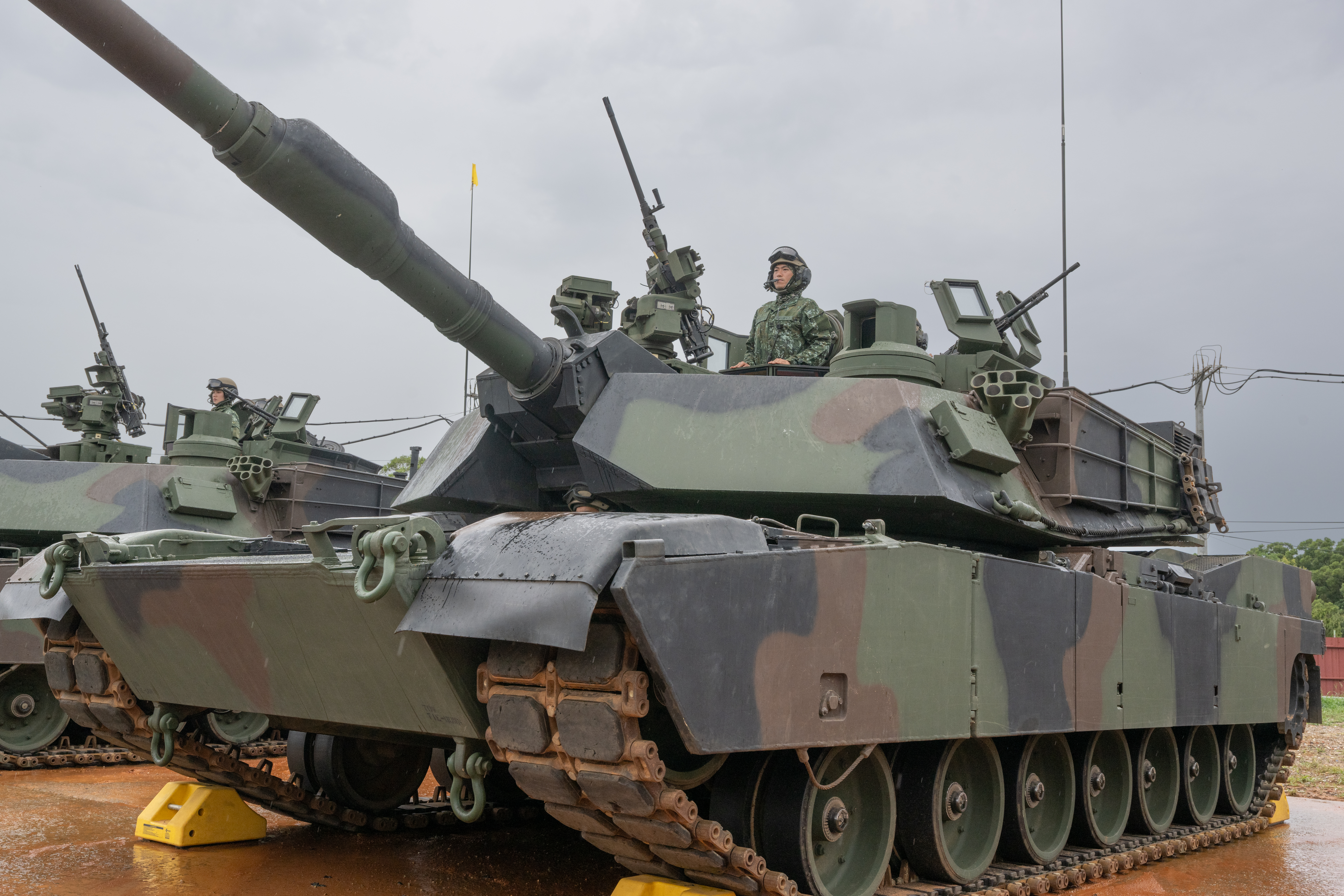
The M1A2T Abrams is the primary main battle tank of the Republic of China Army.

The Army is the land branch of the ROC Armed Forces tasked with defending Taiwan and its offshore islands. Because of the historical legacy of having once controlled mainland China, the Army has traditionally been the dominant branch of the ROC's military forces, has the largest number of personnel, but it has received the biggest reduction in size from the military reforms of the 1990s. Also part of the reform was changing Army divisions into smaller and more mobile combined arms brigades. In recent years, with the reduction of conscription, it has been reported that Army brigades may only have 60% to 80% of the soldiers they require. The Army has several hundred tanks, some from the U.S. and some locally made, though all of them are many decades old. In 2024 Taiwan received its first M1A2 Abrams tanks and first M142 HIMARS artillery systems.

In 2015, the Army was organised into 3 army corps, 5 infantry brigades, 3 mechanized infantry brigades, 4 armoured brigades, 3 aviation brigades, and 5 artillery brigades, with a total of 1,100 tanks and 1,600 artillery pieces. The number of infantry brigades was gradually reduced from 25 in 2005 to 5 by 2016 and the number of armoured brigades from 5 to 4 in 2010, while artillery brigades were increased and army aviation brigades were established in 2015. Also in 2015, the Army's total personnel was reported at 150,000. In 2023 it had 94,000 soldiers.

In 2021, it was announced that Army's corps and regional defence commands will be abolished eventually and replaced with combat theatre commands to better coordinate ground, air, and naval forces. Currently, each corps and defence command of the ROC Army is assigned to a combat theatre command, and the commanding general of each formation will also lead their theatre command in wartime. This was interpreted by some military analysts as reducing the control of the Army over the military command structure and putting a greater focus on joint operations among the three branches. Although they are led by Army generals, in the future Navy and Air Force officers will be appointed as theatre commanders. The new commands are comparable to U.S. unified combatant commands or the theatre commands of the People's Liberation Army. As of 2021 the Army's Kinmen and Matsu island commands were outside of this structure, as was the Aviation and Special Forces Command.

=== Navy ===
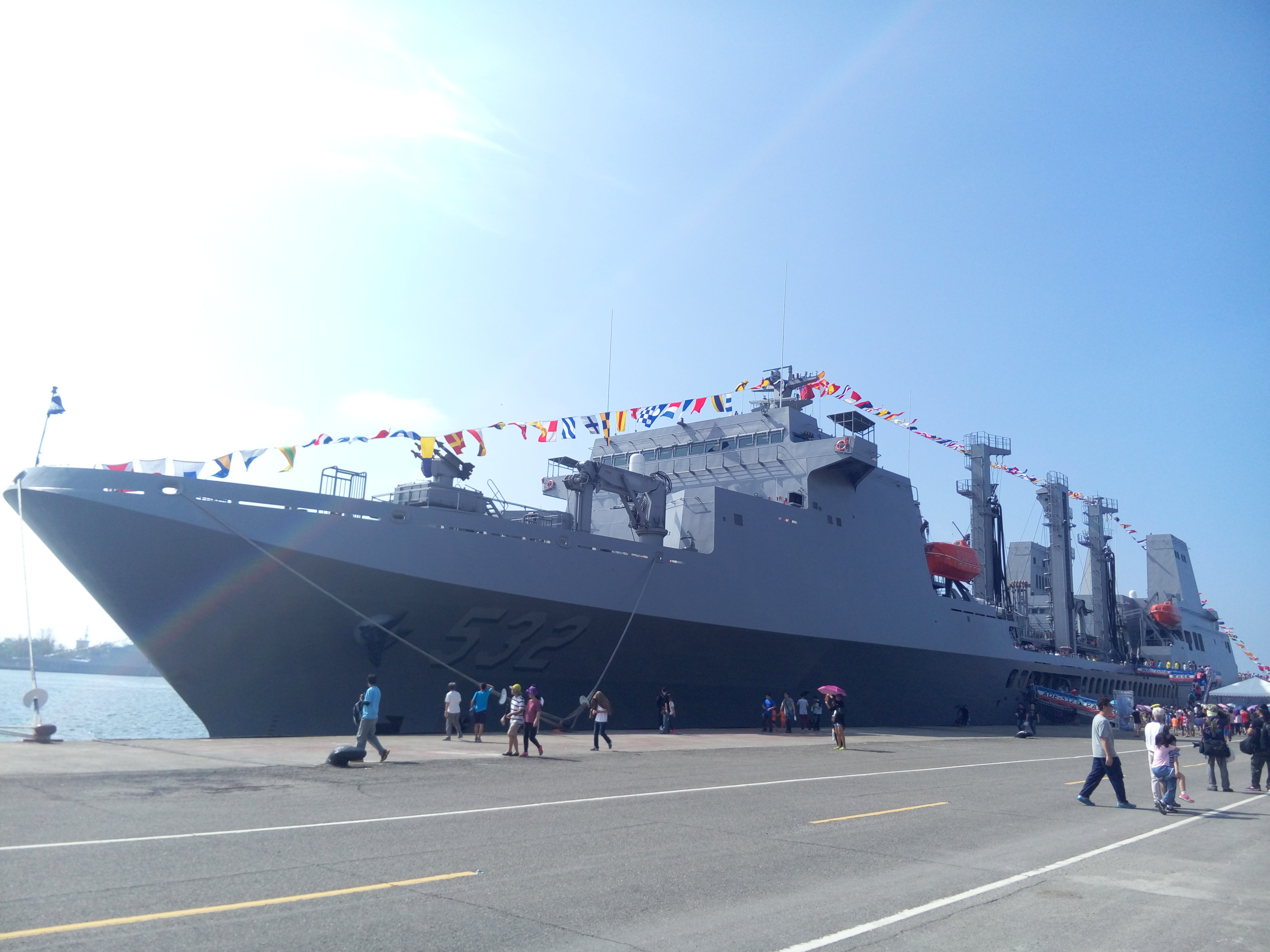
ROCS Pan Shih (AOE-532) combat support ship.

The Navy is responsible for maritime warfare and protecting the waters of Taiwan, including the offshore islands, as well as shipping lanes. The ROC Navy was built up after 1949 with U.S. assistance, receiving destroyers and frigates that were made or designed during World War II. Some of these were still in use at the start of the 1990s, when Taiwan started buying modern ships. In that decade Taiwan acquired French La Fayette frigates, Dutch Zwaardvis submarines, and German minehunters, which are still in service as of 2024. It also received Kidd-class destroyers and Oliver Hazard Perry frigates from the United States. Since the 2000s, the ROCN has tried to improve its asymmetric warfare capability to counter the much larger People's Liberation Army Navy by locally building smaller and stealthier craft, such as fast missile boats, corvettes, and submarines, though its destroyers and frigates remain the main component of the fleet.

The size of the ROCN has not changed significantly between 2005 and 2024, except for the decommissioning of two destroyers and the addition of 12 corvettes. As of 2023 the Navy also had 40,000 personnel. In 2015 the Navy had 4 destroyers, 22 frigates, 1 corvette, 14 landing ships, and 4 diesel attack submarines. The majority of these ships are former U.S. Navy vessels.

==== Marine Corps ====
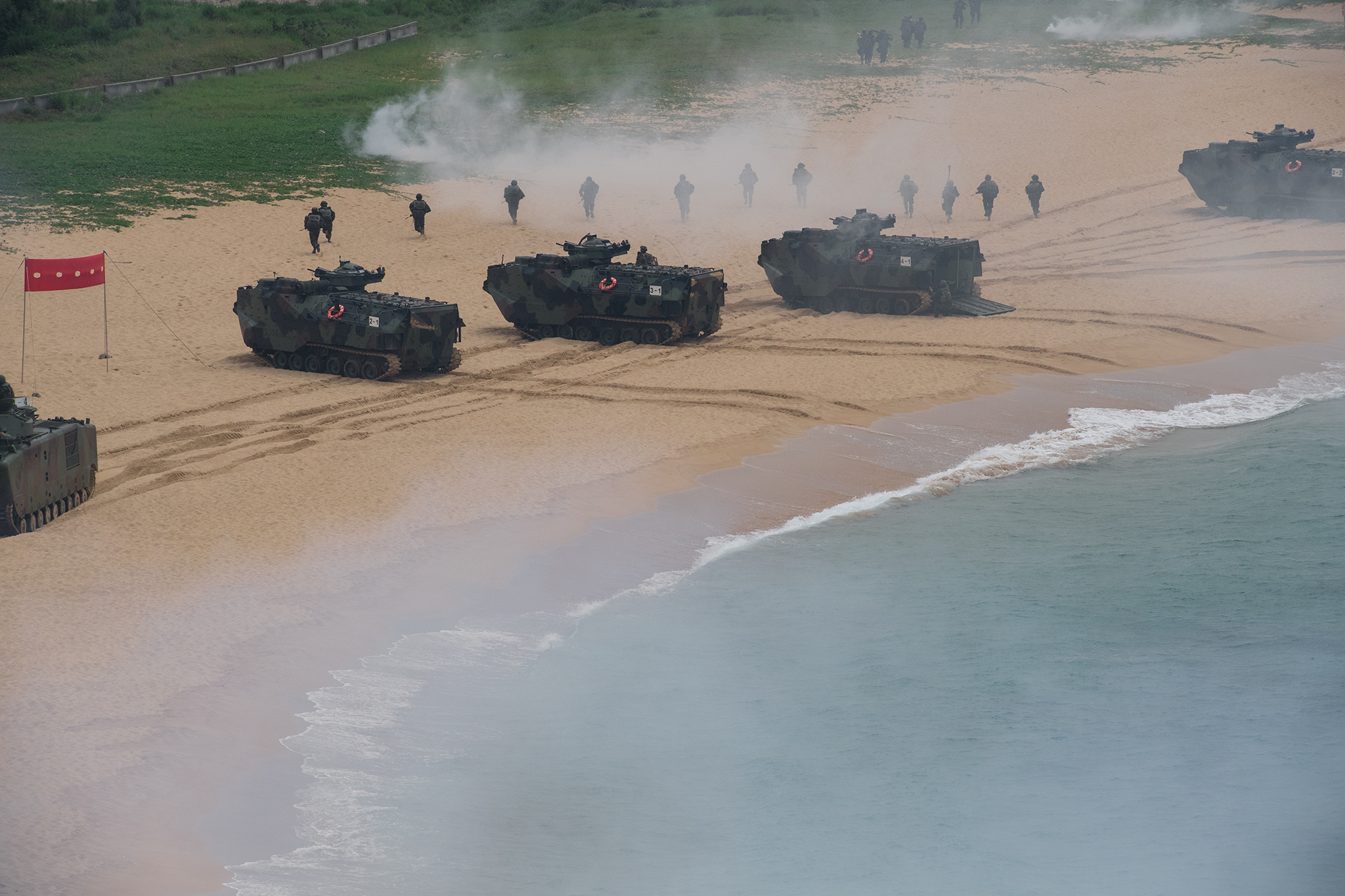
Marine Corps AAV-7 vehicles during an amphibious exercise.

The Marine Corps is the amphibious warfare arm of the ROC Navy. The original purpose of the Marines was to carry out amphibious landings on the mainland to establish a bridgehead for Army forces, and starting in the 1950s the ROC Marines received training in amphibious warfare from the USMC. Training exercises with the USMC were officially ended in 1979, but were resumed in 2017. More recently, the main purpose of the Marine Corps has been to defend Taiwan by disrupting PRC amphibious operations and to serve as a rapid response force. In 2021 Marines were deployed to Pratas Island when the PLA carried out war games in the area. In 2023 there were 10,000 ROC Marines, and they were organised in two Marine brigades, a special forces unit (the Amphibious Reconnaissance and Patrol Unit), and some support units.

=== Air Force ===
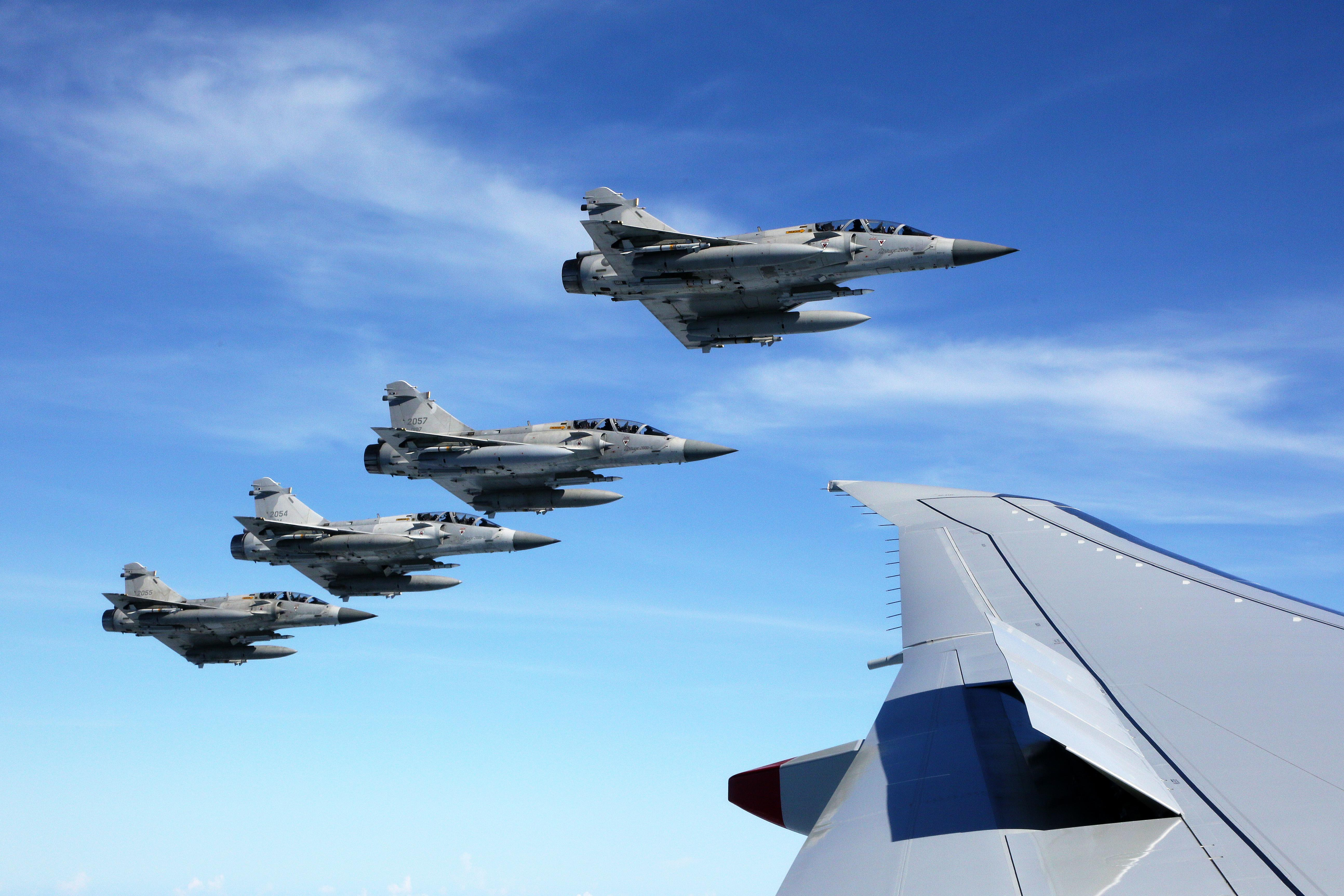
ROCAF Mirage 2000 fighters escorting the president's plane.

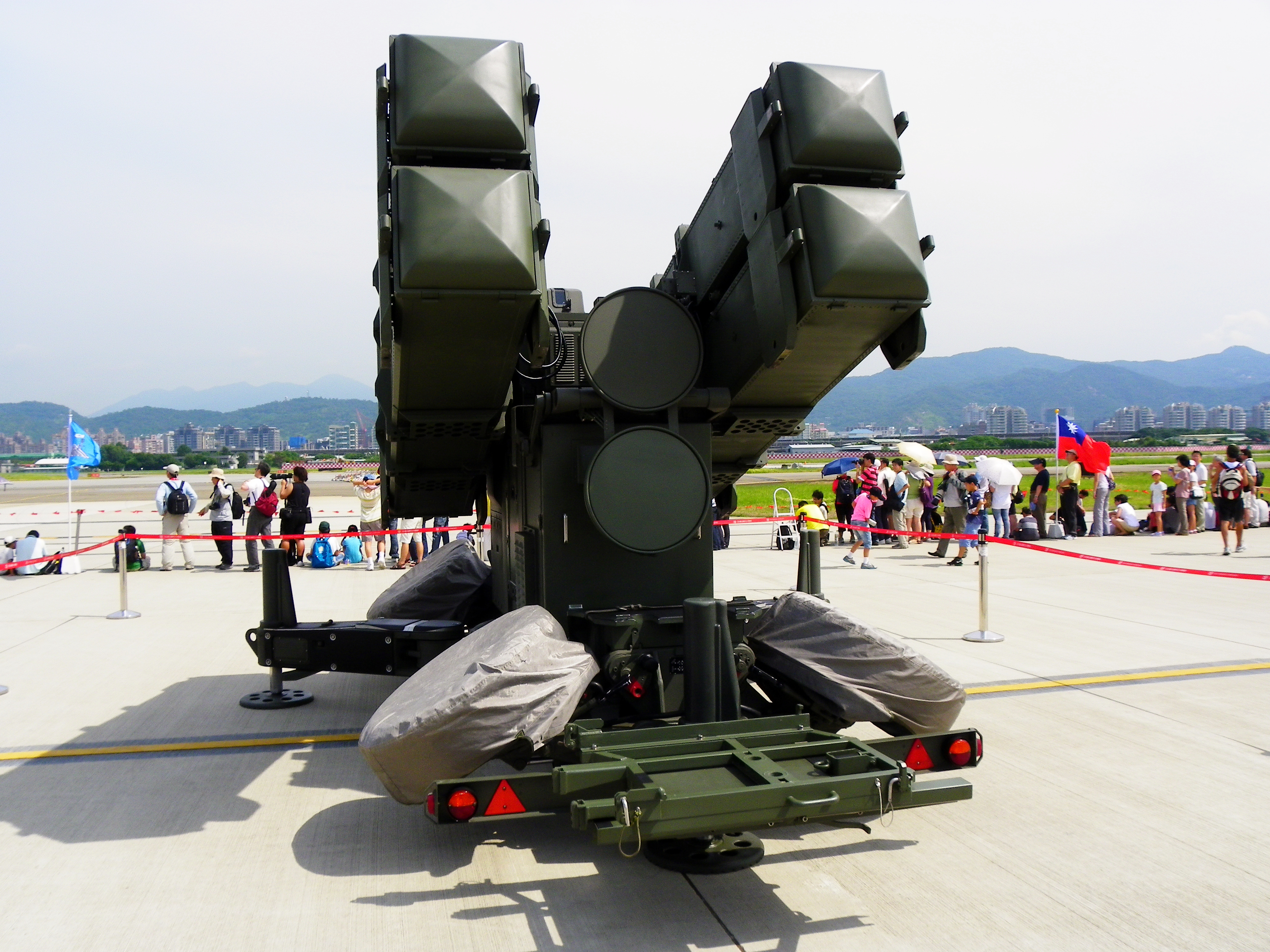
Air Defense Skyguard system Sparrow missile launcher.

The Air Force is responsible for defending Taiwanese airspace and assisting in disaster relief. In recent years the ROCAF had to send aircraft to respond to Chinese planes entering Taiwan's air defence identification zone. Founded on mainland China, the ROC Air Force on Taiwan received U.S. military assistance in the Cold War, including over 400 aircraft, which were mostly fighters. Beginning in 1954 with the F-86 Sabre, by the late 1980s the ROCAF's fighter force also had the F-100 Super Sabre, the F-104 Starfighter, and Northrop F-5. In the 1990s Taiwan began acquiring more modern aircraft to replace the F-5 and to counter the improving People's Liberation Army Air Force, including the F-16 Fighting Falcon and the Dassault Mirage 2000.

The Air Force has reduced its total number of aircraft in the mid-2000s, has been replacing them with more modern fighters. As of 2015, the ROC Air Force had 384 fighters, 19 transports, and 25 aircraft of other types, a reduction from 420 fighters and 40 transport aircraft as of 2005. In 2024 the ROCAF had a total of 35,000 personnel and 430 combat capable aircraft, being organised into 28 squadrons. The main components of the ROC Air Force are the Air Combatant Command and the Air Defense and Missile Command, the latter having five brigades equipped with AA missile systems and several battalions of AA artillery. Its current fighters include the Dassault Mirage 2000, AIDC F-CK-1 Ching-kuo, and the F-16 Fighting Falcon. Although the PLAAF has both technological and numerical superiority over the ROCAF, Taiwan has made efforts to improve its aircraft, including upgrading its F-16 fleet to the most advanced variant, the Block 70 Viper (F-16V).

=== Military Police ===
The Military Police are tasked with enforcing military discipline, supporting the civilian police, providing security for government officials and buildings, counterterrorism, and defending the capital of Taipei. The ROCMP is organised into four regional commands (including one for Taipei) which consist of several battalions and other units. In 2024 there were 5,000 MPs. The Military Police Command plans to double the size of its current force in the future to increase security in the capital city.

=== Reserve ===
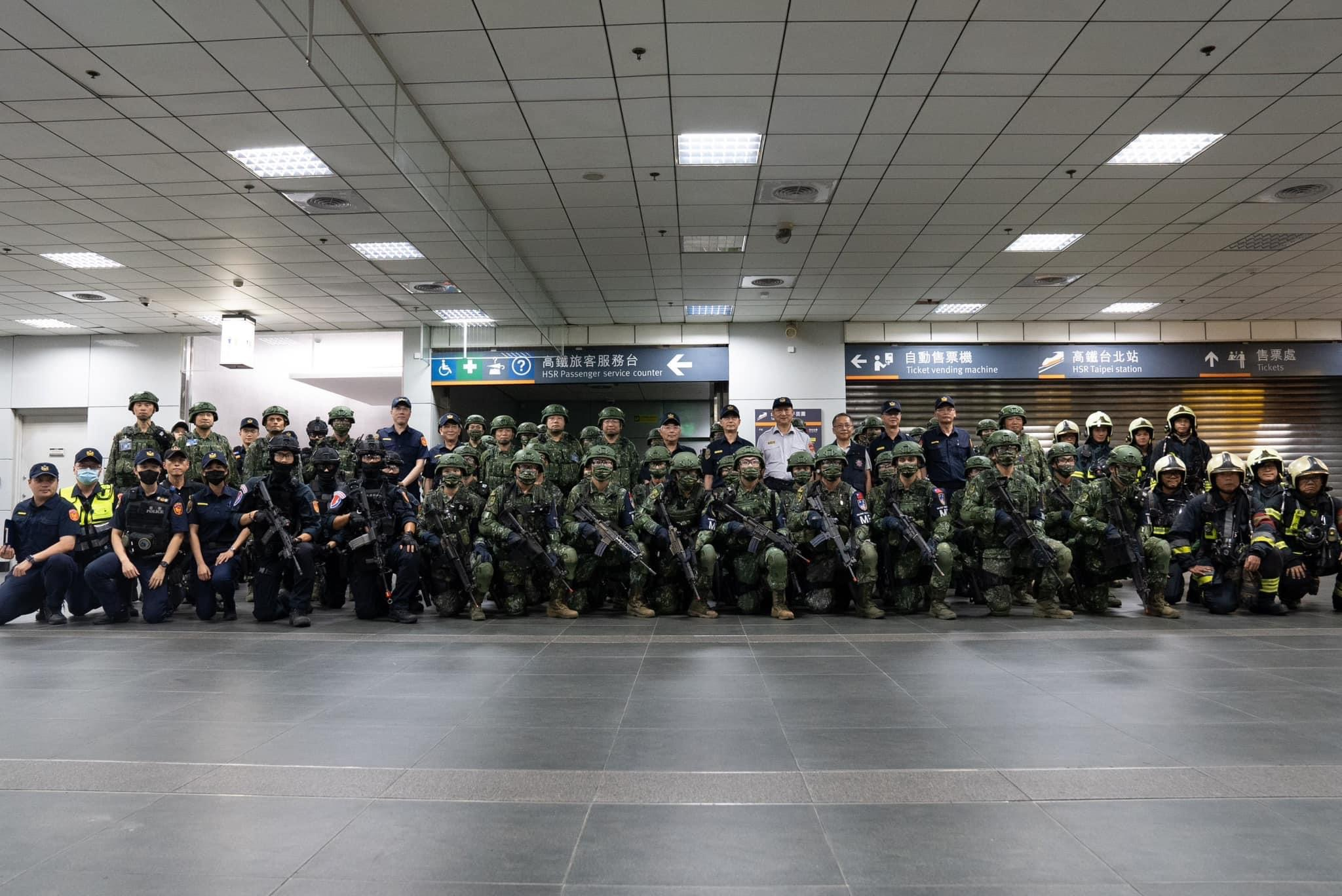
Participants of the 2023 civil defence exercise in Taipei, involving the Armed Forces Reserve, the Military Police, and the city police and firefighters.

The Reserve Command manages the Armed Forces Reserve, and has a headquarters staff of 400. There are three regional reserve commands that each oversee a reserve training centre and offices at the county and municipal levels (Northern, Central, and Southern Area Reserve Commands). The Command is responsible for maintaining mobilization plans and training reserve units during peace time, consisting of fourteen days of drill every one years, and more extensive training in the event of a wartime mobilization. It also has the task of preparing the civilian industries of Taiwan to assist the military during a war, and being the coordinator of an all-out defence effort that involves the civilian population.

As of 2023, the Reserve was estimated to have a total of 1,657,000 reservists by the International Institute of Strategic Studies, including 1.5 million in the Army, 67,000 in the Navy, and 90,000 in the Air Force. The RAND Corporation estimated in 2017 that the total number of reservists is 2.5 million, including 60,000 each in the Navy and the Air Force.

The Army Reserve would form 44 infantry brigades and 2 armoured Brigade. These brigades are organised into four categories depending on the level of readiness: A-Level brigades are the highest level, and include active-duty troops that would serve with reservists; B-Level brigades would consist of cadets studying at military schools and academies; C-Level brigades are local units and represent the largest category in the reserves, and D-Level brigades would be drawn from reserve officer training courses operated by Reserve Command. Army A-Level and B-level brigades along with Marine reserve units would have a front line role similar to regular forces, while the other Army reserves would be used for static defence of important locations. Navy and Air Force reservists would have a supporting role at naval or air bases.

== Personnel ==
As of 2024 the armed forces are estimated to have between 150,000 and 169,000 personnel. The number of reservists is estimated at 1.657 million. Starting in 2024, Taiwanese male citizens are required to serve 12 months in the military.

According to the December 2022 reform known as the "Strengthening All-People's Defense Military Force Restructuring Plan" (強化全民國防兵力結構調整方案), ROCAF personnel will be organised into four categories: the Main Battle Troops (主戰部隊), the active-duty volunteer force that will be responsible primarily for fighting; the Garrison Troops (守備部隊), that will mostly consist of conscripts and be used for defending infrastructure; the Civil Defense System (民防系統), consisting of alternative service personnel that do not want or are ineligible for combat roles and will be used for humanitarian aid, medical assistance, and logistics; and the Reserve System (後備系統), providing former volunteers for the Main Battle Troops and former conscripts for the Garrison Troops.

Immigrants from the PRC have to reside in Taiwan for twenty years before they can volunteer for military service. They are exempt from conscription.

In 2025 the Taiwanese government increased the monthly bonus for volunteer service members to NT$30,000 (US$1,000), roughly double the previous amount.

=== All-out defence ===
Since 2021, training for reserve formations has been increased with an emphasis placed on urban and asymmetric warfare. The training period for reservists has been increased to two weeks from 5–7 days. In 2022 reserves numbered 2.31 million. The 2022 Russian invasion of Ukraine increased support for and understanding from the public of the effectiveness of well-trained and equipped reserves. In 2022 women were included in reserve training. Following the Russian invasion, the Ministry of Defense raised the required national stockpile minimum for medication from two months to six months with up to a years worth of stockpiles mandated for critical drugs.

The military runs combat training camps for high school students during school breaks.

=== Conscription ===
During the 2000s, there were initial plans to turn the ROCAF into a volunteer armed forces as relations between the ROC and PRC were improving during this time. In 2012, ROC Ministry of National Defence announced that the length of service was reduced to 4 months from the original 1 year in December 2011 for those born after 1 January 1994, due to aims to establish an all-volunteer force. As since, all able-bodied men reaching conscription age will undergo 4 month long military training instead of serving for 1 year, as it was done previously. Those born prior to 1 January 1994 and were yet to complete their military service were given an option to serve in a non-combatant role for a duration of one year. During the 2010s, when conscription was reduced to four months of training, the military struggled to meet its recruitment targets, especially for combat roles.

This policy was reversed in 2022, when president Tsai Ing-wen announced that conscription will revert to 1 year from 2024, as relations with the PRC had deteriorated since at least 2016 when her party came into power. The required four months of training, when it was in effect, was also criticized as being not enough to provide conscripts with military training.

=== Rank structure ===
==== Officers ====
The ROC Armed Forces' officer corps is generally viewed as being competent, displaying a high degree of professionalism. However, as a whole, the culture in the officer corps tends to be very cautious and conservative. The military also faces difficulties in the recruitment and retention of junior officers and NCOs due to competition with the private sector.

Officers are promoted monthly with ceremonial conferences of rank carried out twice a year. Previously both the promotions and ceremonial conferences had been carried out simultaneously on a biannual cycle.

The Republic of China Military Academy, the Naval Academy, and the Air Force Academy are the officer commissioning academies of each service branch.

NATO code	OF-10	OF-9		OF-8	OF-7	OF-6	OF-5	OF-4	OF-3	OF-2	OF-1
Republic of China Army
Republic of China Army		一級上將; Yījí shàngjiàng	二級上將; Èrjí shàngjiàng	中將; Zhōngjiàng	少將; Shàojiàng		上校; Shàngxiào	中校; Zhōngxiào	少校; Shàoxiào	上尉; Shàngwèi	中尉; Zhōngwèi	少尉; Shàowèi
Republic of China Military Police
Republic of China Military Police				中將; Zhōngjiàng	少將; Shàojiàng		上校; Shàngxiào	中校; Zhōngxiào	少校; Shàoxiào	上尉; Shàngwèi	中尉; Zhōngwèi	少尉; Shàowèi
Republic of China Navy
Republic of China Navy		一級上將; Yījí shàngjiàng	二級上將; Èrjí shàngjiàng	中將; Zhōngjiàng	少將; Shàojiàng		上校; Shàngxiào	中校; Zhōngxiào	少校; Shàoxiào	上尉; Shàngwèi	中尉; Zhōngwèi	少尉; Shàowèi
Republic of China Marine Corps
Republic of China Marine Corps		二級上將; Èrjí shàngjiàng		中將; Zhōngjiàng	少將; Shàojiàng		上校; Shàngxiào	中校; Zhōngxiào	少校; Shàoxiào	上尉; Shàngwèi	中尉; Zhōngwèi	少尉; Shàowèi
Republic of China Air Force
Republic of China Air Force		一級上將; Yījí shàngjiàng	二級上將; Èrjí shàngjiàng	中將; Zhōngjiàng	少將; Shàojiàng		上校; Shàngxiào	中校; Zhōngxiào	少校; Shàoxiào	上尉; Shàngwèi	中尉; Zhōngwèi	少尉; Shàowèi
NATO code	OF-10	OF-9		OF-8	OF-7	OF-6	OF-5	OF-4	OF-3	OF-2	OF-1

==== Enlisted ====
NATO code	OR-9	OR-8	OR-7	OR-6	OR-5	OR-4	OR-3	OR-2	OR-1
Republic of China Army
Republic of China Army	一等士官長; Yīděng shìguānzhǎng	二等士官長; Èrděng shìguānzhǎng	三等士官長; Sānděng shìguānzhǎng	上士; Shàngshì	中士; Zhōngshì	下士; Xiàshì	上等兵; Shàngděngbīng	一等兵; Yīděngbīng	二等兵; Èrděngbīng
Republic of China Military Police
Republic of China Military Police	一等士官長; Yīděng shìguānzhǎng	二等士官長; Èrděng shìguānzhǎng	三等士官長; Sānděng shìguānzhǎng	上士; Shàngshì	中士; Zhōngshì	下士; Xiàshì	上等兵; Shàngděngbīng	一等兵; Yīděngbīng	二等兵; Èrděngbīng
Republic of China Navy
Republic of China Navy	一等士官長; Yīděng shìguānzhǎng	二等士官長; Èrděng shìguānzhǎng	三等士官長; Sānděng shìguānzhǎng	上士; Shàngshì	中士; Zhōngshì	下士; Xiàshì	上等兵; Shàngděngbīng	一等兵; Yīděngbīng	二等兵; Èrděngbīng
Republic of China Marine Corps
Republic of China Marine Corps	一等士官長; Yīděng shìguānzhǎng	二等士官長; Èrděng shìguānzhǎng	三等士官長; Sānděng shìguānzhǎng	上士; Shàngshì	中士; Zhōngshì	下士; Xiàshì	上等兵; Shàngděngbīng	一等兵; Yīděngbīng	二等兵; Èrděngbīng
Republic of China Air Force
Republic of China Air Force	一等士官長; Yīděng shìguānzhǎng	二等士官長; Èrděng shìguānzhǎng	三等士官長; Sānděng shìguānzhǎng	上士; Shàngshì	中士; Zhōngshì	下士; Xiàshì	上等兵; Shàngděngbīng	一等兵; Yīděngbīng	二等兵; Èrděngbīng
NATO code	OR-9	OR-8	OR-7	OR-6	OR-5	OR-4	OR-3	OR-2	OR-1

=== Women ===
Women have a long history of service in Taiwan's armed forces but were exempted from conscription. In 2022, Chen Yu-lin, a political warfare officer, became the first woman promoted to the rank of two star Lieutenant General. In 2023, 15% of active duty military personnel were women.

=== Indigenous ===
Taiwanese indigenous people make up a greater percentage of Taiwan's armed forces than their percentage of the overall Taiwanese population, making up 8.7 percent of military personnel as of 2024. Taiwanese indigenous people are especially critical to elite military units where they constitute over half of the personnel in some units.

== Arms purchases and weapons development ==
=== Arms purchases ===
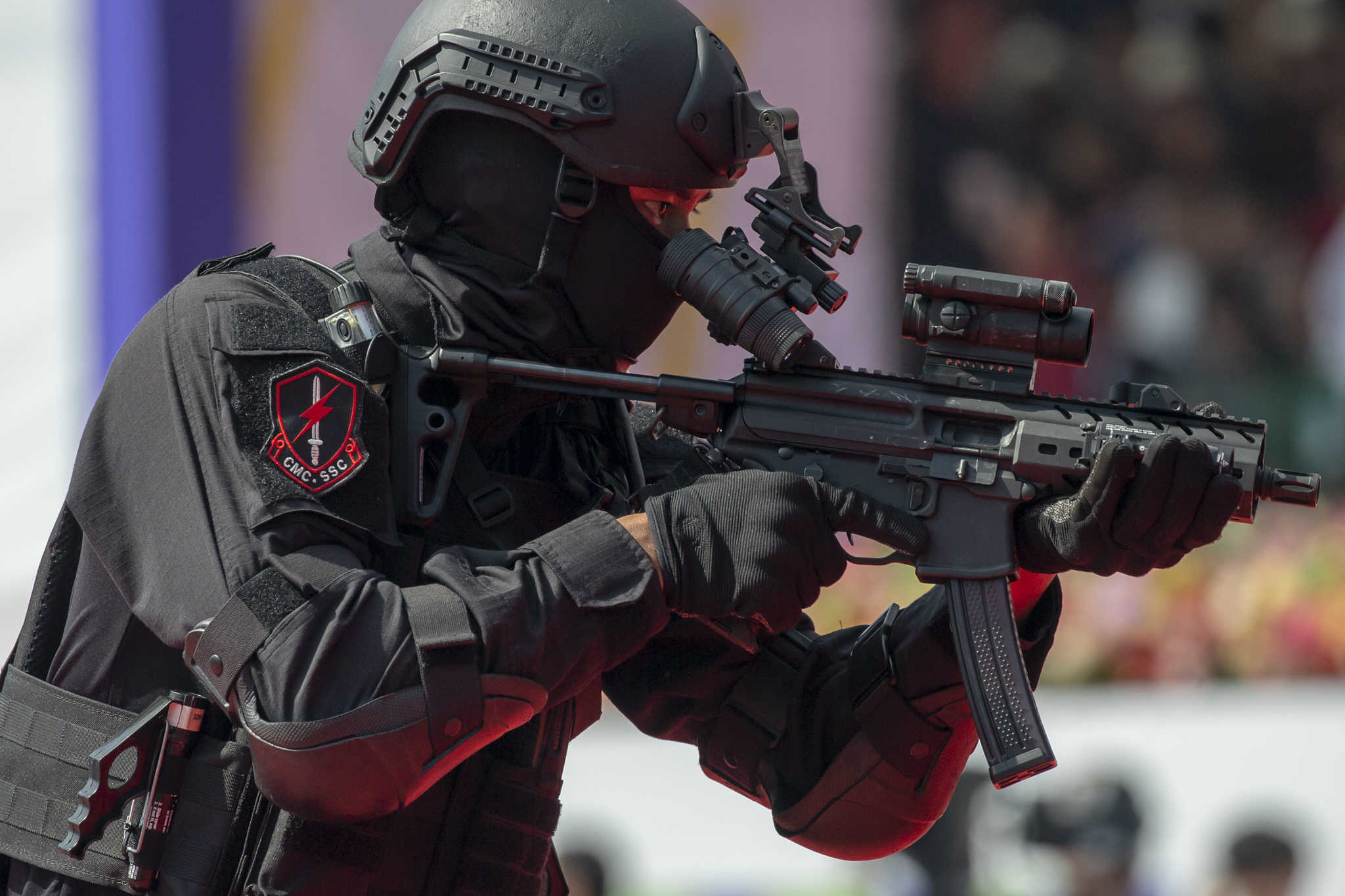
ROC Marine Corps Special Service Company Operator with SIG MPX

Acquisitions over the next several years will emphasize modern ISR equipment that will vastly improve communications and data-sharing among services. These and other planned acquisitions will gradually shift the island's strategic emphasis to offshore engagement of invading PRC forces. It is hoped that this will serve to reduce civilian casualties and damage to infrastructure in the event of armed conflict.

The ROC's armed forces are equipped with weapons obtained primarily from the United States, France, United Kingdom and the Netherlands.

In July 2007 it was reported that the ROC Army would request the purchase of 30 AH-64D II Apache attack helicopters based on the 2008 defence budget. The United Daily News reported that as many as 90 UH-60 Black Hawk helicopters would also be ordered to replace the UH-1Hs then in service.

During August, the ROC requested 60 AGM-84L Harpoon Block II missiles, two Harpoon guidance control units, 30 Harpoon containers, 30 Harpoon extended air-launch lugs, 50 Harpoon upgrade kits from AGM-84G to AGM-84L configuration and other related elements of logistics and program support, to a total value of US$125 million. The United States government indicated its approval of the order with notification to the United States Congress of the potential sale.

In mid-September 2007, the Pentagon notified the U.S. Congress of P-3C Orion order, which included 12 Orions and three "spare aircraft", along with an order for 144 SM-2 Block IIIA missiles. The total value of the 12 P-3C Orions were estimated at $1.96 billion and $272 million for the 144 SM-2 missiles. A contract was awarded to Lockheed Martin to refurbish the 12 P-3C Orion aircraft for the ROC on 13 March 2009, with deliveries to start in 2012.

In mid-November 2007, the Pentagon notified the US Congress about a possible sale to upgrade the ROC's existing three Patriot missile batteries to the PAC-3 standard. The total value of the upgrade could be as much as $939 million.

The US government announced on 3 October that it planned to sell $6.5 billion worth of arms to the ROC ending the freeze of arms sales to the ROC. The plans include $2.5 billion worth of 30 AH-64D Block III Apache Longbow attack helicopters with night-vision sensors, radar, 174 Stinger Block I air-to-air missiles, 1,000 AGM-114L Hellfire missiles, PAC-3 missiles (330), four missile batteries, radar sets, ground stations and other equipment valued up to $3.1 billion. E-2T aircraft upgraded to E-2C Hawkeye 2000 standard were also included, worth up to $250 million. $200 million worth of submarine-launched Harpoon Block II missiles (32) would also be available for sale, $334 million worth of various aircraft spare parts and 182 Javelin missiles, with 20 Javelin command launchers.

However, not included in the arms sale were new F-16 C/D fighters, the feasibility study for diesel-electric submarines or UH-60 Black Hawk helicopters. The White House had declined to sell 66 F-16C/D fighter planes as US Pacific Command has felt no need for advanced arms to be sold to the ROC.

On 29 January 2010 the US government announced five notifications to US Congress for arms sales to the ROC, two Osprey class mine hunters for $105 million (all figures in US dollars), 25 Link 16 terminals on ships for $340 million, two ship- and two air-launched Harpoon L/II for $37 million, 60 UH-60M and other related items for $3.1 billion and three PAC-3 batteries with 26 launchers and 114 PAC-3 missiles for $2.81 billion, for a total $6.392 billion overall.

The ROC's efforts at arms purchases have consistently been opposed by the PRC. Asymmetric acquisitions should replace more expensive traditional military gear according to David Sacks, a fellow at the Council on Foreign Relations.

=== Local Weapons Development ===
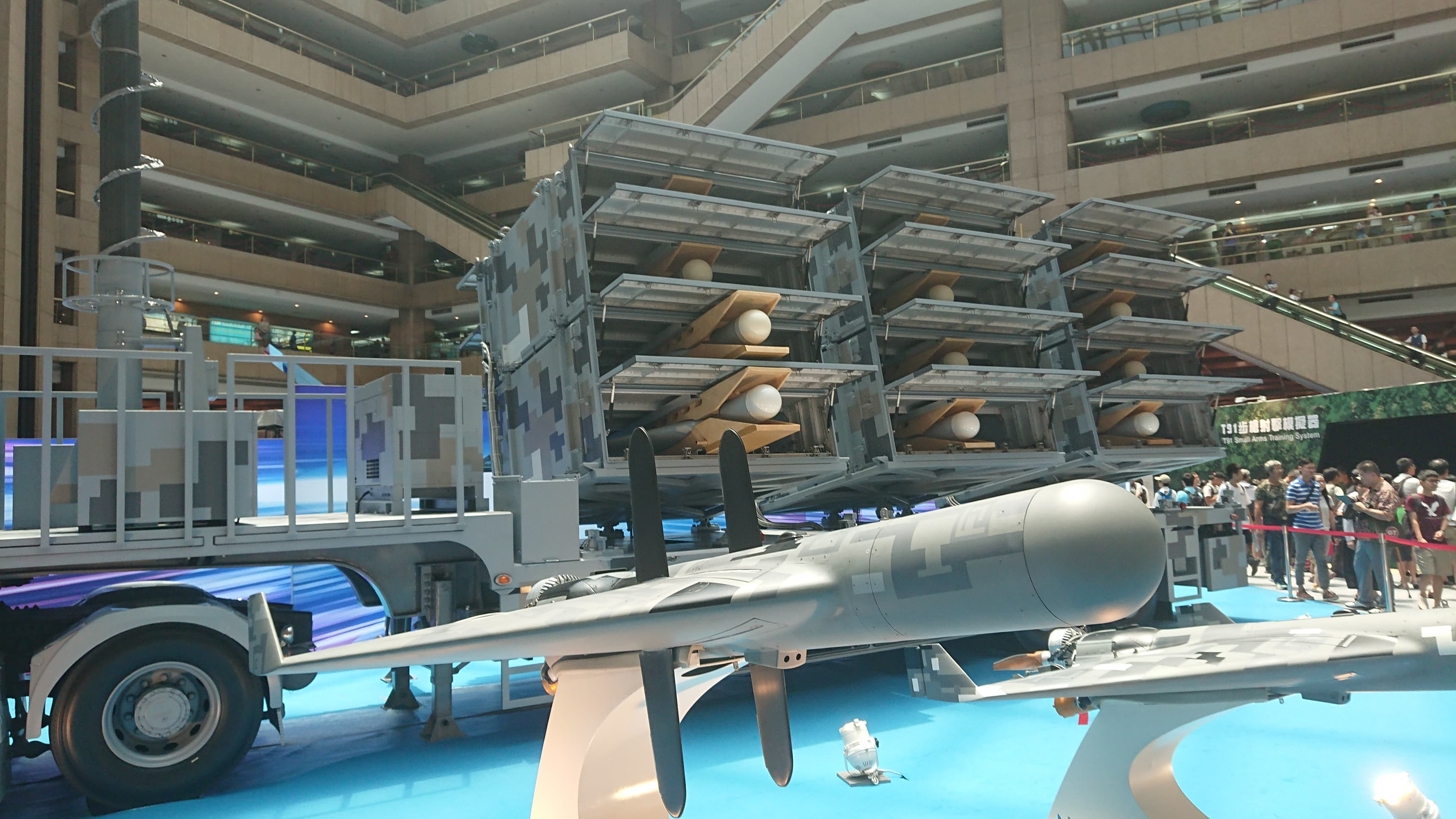
NCSIST Chien Hsiang loitering munition

The military's light weapons are generally managed by the Armaments Bureau of the Ministry of National Defense, whose 205th Arsenal is responsible for developing and producing light weapons such as T65 assault rifle, T75 Light machine gun, T86 assault rifle, T91 assault rifle, T75 pistol, various types of bullets etc.

The military has also stressed military "self-reliance," which has led to the growth of indigenous military production, producing items such as the ROC's Indigenous Defense Fighter, the Thunderbolt 2000 Multiple Launch Rocket System, Clouded Leopard Armoured Vehicle, the Sky Bow II and Sky Bow III SAMs and Hsiung Feng series of anti-ship missiles.

== Reforms and development ==
=== Civilian control of the military ===
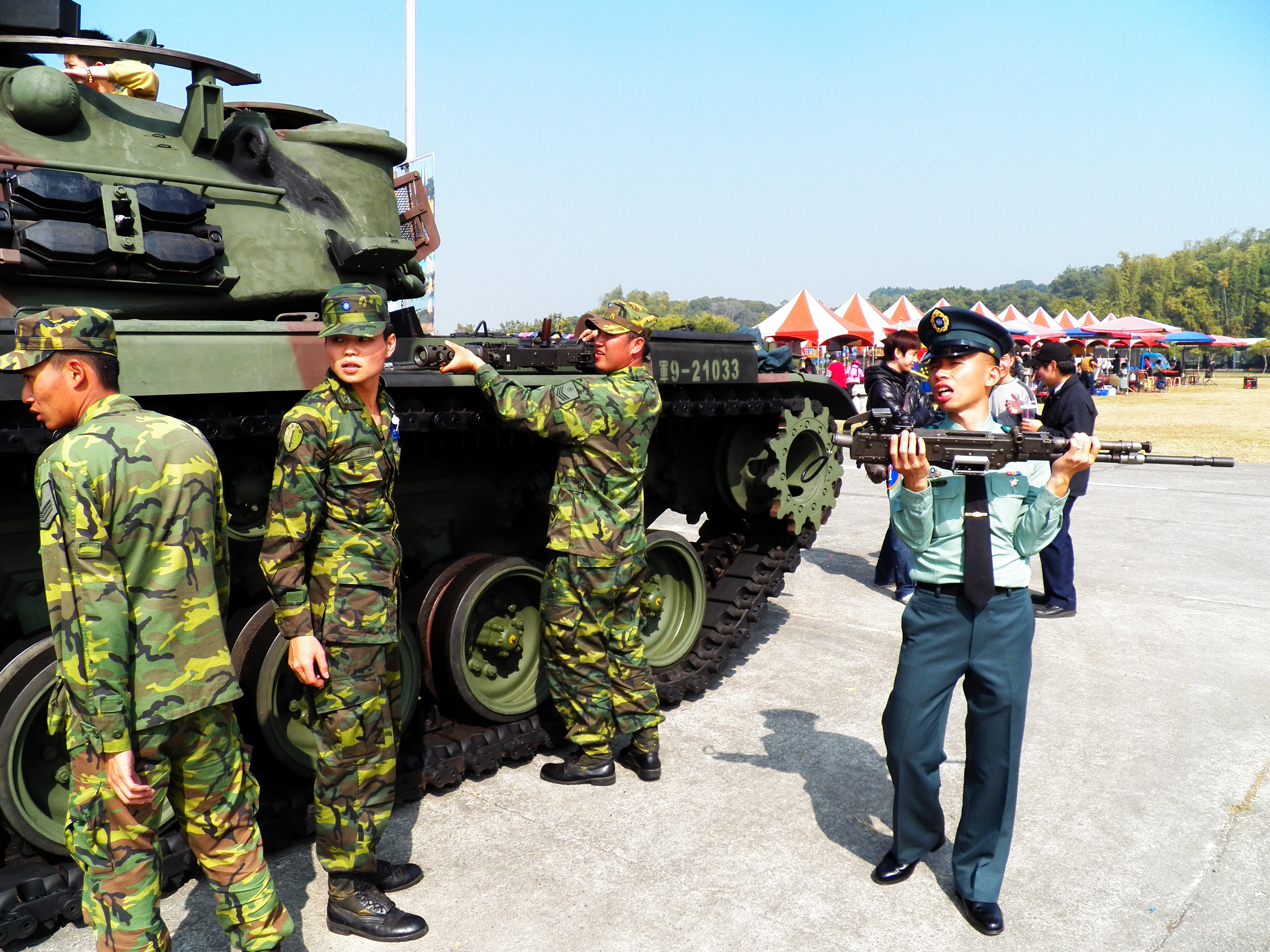
R.O.C. Army soldiers removing the machine guns from a CM-12 Tank

The modern day ROC military is styled after western military systems, mostly the US military. Internally, it has a political warfare branch/department that tightly controls and monitors each level of the ROC military, and reports directly to the General Headquarters of the ROC military, and if necessary, directly to the President of the ROC. This is a carryover from the pre-1949 era, when KMT and its army were penetrated by Communist agents repeatedly and led to frontline units defecting to Communist China. To strengthen their control over the military and prevent massive defection after retreating to Taiwan in 1949, CKS and CCK employed tight control over the military, by installing political officers and commissioners down to the company level, in order to ensure political correctness in the military and loyalty toward ROC leadership. This gave the political officers/commissars a great deal of power, allowing them to overrule the unit commander and take over the unit. Only in recent years has the political warfare department (due to cutbacks) reduced its power within the ROC military.

Two defence reform laws implemented in 2002 granted the civilian defence minister control over the entire military, and expanded legislative oversight authority for the first time in history. In the past the ROC military was closely linked with and controlled by the KMT (Nationalist Party). Following the democratization of the 1990s the military moved to a politically neutral position, though the senior officer ranks remained dominated by KMT members in 2001. In the years following the handover of control to civilian authority politicians remained wary of associating too closely with the military due to the legacy of martial law and the associated abuses conducted by the military. Support for the military increased in accordance with threats from the PRC and the Russian invasion of Ukraine however even in the 2020s many Taiwanese were still distrustful of the military.

=== Doctrine and exercises ===
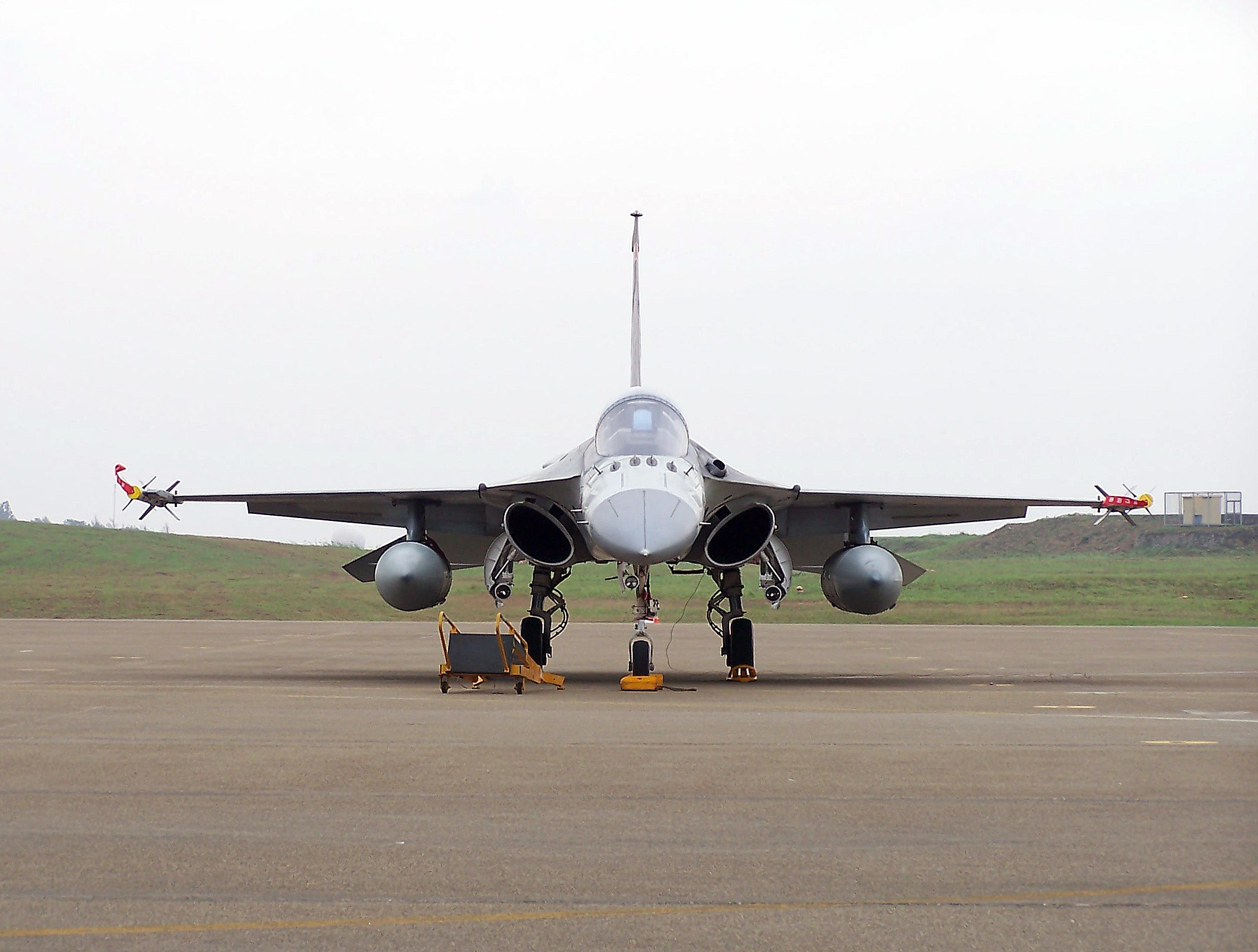
ROCAF AIDC F-CK Indigenous Defense Fighter

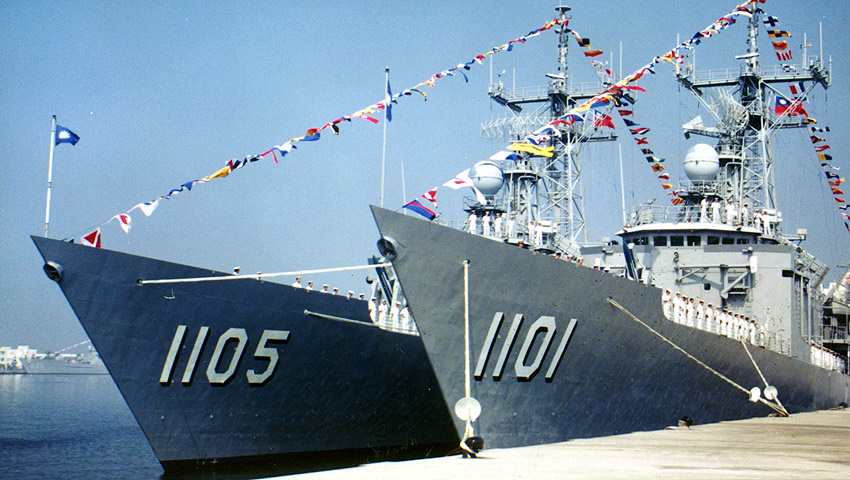
ROCN Cheng Kung-class frigate

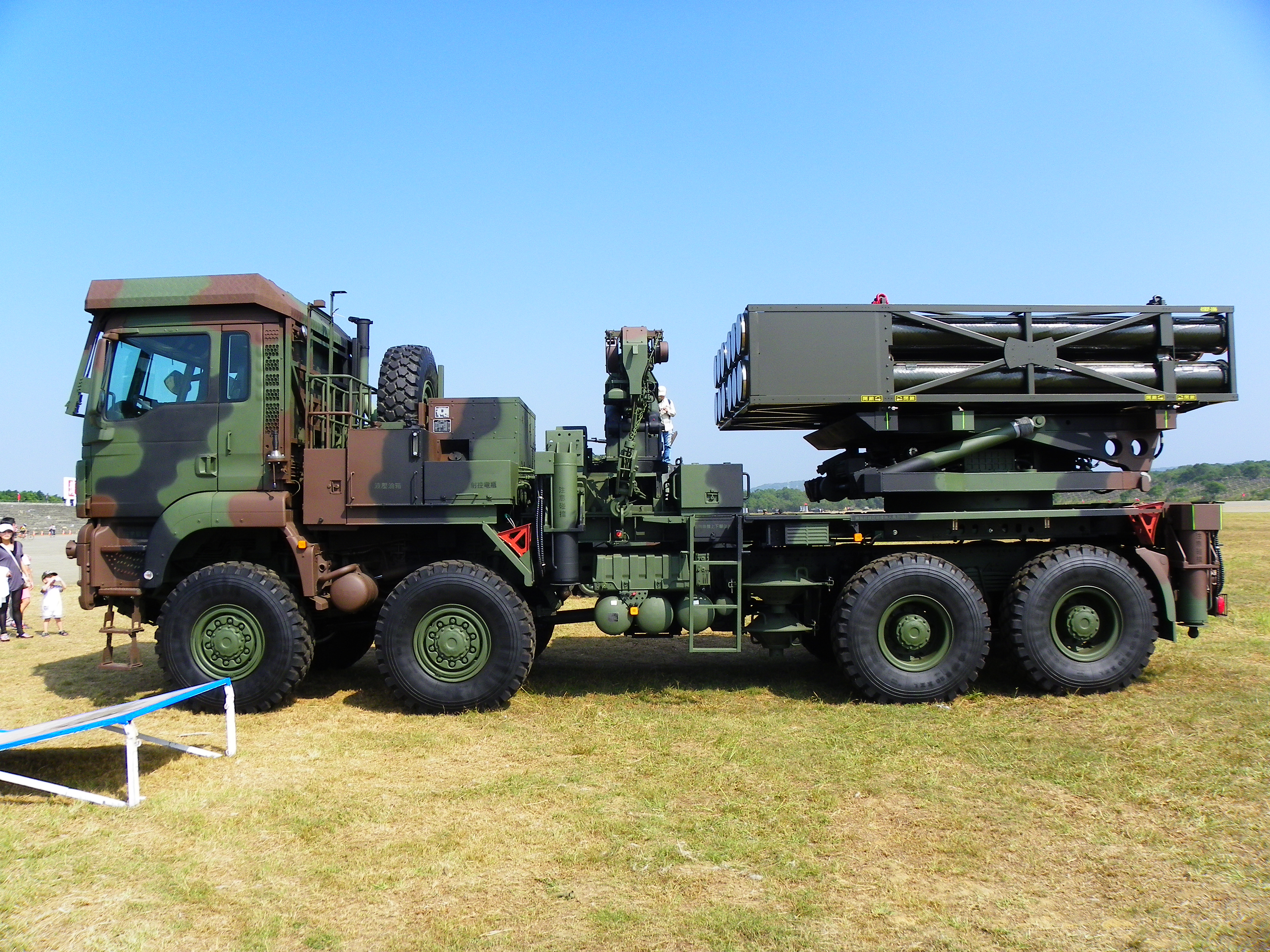
ROCA Thunderbolt-2000

The primary goal of the ROC Armed Forces is to provide a credible deterrent against hostile action by establishing effective counterstrike and defence capabilities. ROC military doctrine in 2004 centred upon the principle of "offshore engagement" where the primary goal of the armed forces in any conflict with the PRC would be to keep as much of the fighting away from Taiwan proper for as long as possible to minimize damage to infrastructure and civilian casualties. As of 2004 the military had also begun to take the threat of a sudden "decapitation attack" by the PRC seriously. Consequently, there was growing emphasis on the role of the Navy and Air Force (where the Army had traditionally dominated); as well as the development of rapid reaction forces and quick mobilization of local reserve forces.

As of 2021 training for electronic warfare had been emphasized with significant offensive and defensive capabilities having been fielded.

The Han Kuang Exercise is the annual military exercise of the Republic of China Armed Forces for combat readiness in the event of an attack by the People's Liberation Army.

=== Strategy ===
Taiwan's strategy has shifted significantly in the post-cold war era. Under President Chen Shui-bian it centred on the "Decisive Battle Offshore" (决戰境外) in which an invasion force would be engaged as far away from Taiwan as possible. This strategy led to a deemphasis on the Army and increased emphasis on the Air Force and Navy. In terms of force structure it took a two part approach with a smaller professional force who would take the initiative in a conflict and a larger conscripted force which would primarily perform support and garrison duties.

The Ma Ying-jeou administration introduced the "Hard ROC" strategy which emphasized asymmetrical warfare and exploiting the natural advantages of being the defender, also referred to as a "porcupine strategy." This strategy emphasized hardening and mobility over active defence or long range strike. It also placed an emphasis on professional soldiers over conscripts with conscription greatly decreased during this period. Total force structure decreased by nearly 100,000 during this period. In 2014 Taiwan Minister of National Defense Yen Ming believed that the country would be able to hold off a Chinese invasion for at least one month.

In the late 2010s under the Tsai Ing-wen administration, Taiwan's military adopted a new strategy called the Overall Defense Concept (ODC), according to The Diplomat "In short, the ODC is a holistically integrated strategy for guiding Taiwan's military force development and joint operations, emphasizing Taiwan's existing natural advantages, civilian infrastructure and asymmetrical warfare capabilities. It is designed to deter and, if necessary, defeat an invasion by China's People's Liberation Army (PLA)." In 2021 Defense Minister Chiu Kuo-cheng said that "I always tell my peers to stop asking, 'how many days we need to hold out?' The question is, 'how many days does China want to fight?' We'll keep them company for as many days as they want to fight." The adopted ODC emphasizes deep strike and layered deterrence.

== Foreign cooperation ==
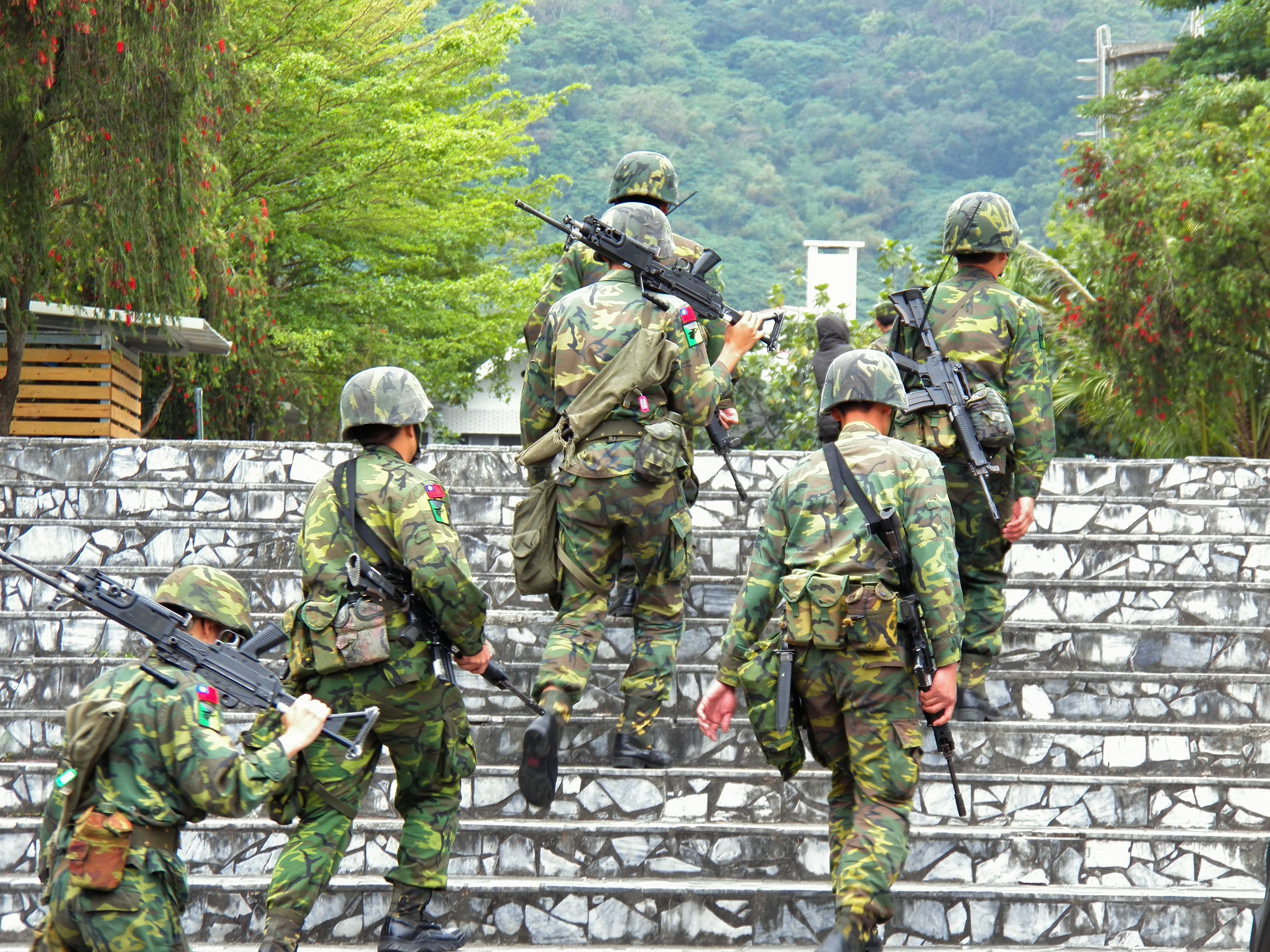
ROC Army Hualien-Taitung Defense Command soldiers with a T75 Light machine gun

Taiwan has engaged in training with foreign forces, primarily American and British, for a long time but cooperation was stepped up after the passage of the Taiwan Travel Act in 2018. Exchanges between high ranking Taiwanese officers and their NATO counterparts have also been on the rise. This cooperation includes both military and academic exchanges such as those with the NATO School and the NATO Defense College.

=== El Salvador ===
In the 1970s the Republic of China trained Salvadoran officers involved in human rights violations during the country's civil war.

=== European Union ===
In 2011 and 2012 Taiwan worked with the EU's Naval Force in Operation Atalanta to counter piracy off the coast of Somalia. Since then exchanges and information sharing has continued, between 2011 and 2015 EU anti-piracy officials made five visits to Taiwan.

=== Eswatini ===
In 2020, Taiwan donated two UH-1H utility helicopters to Eswatini.

=== Guatemala ===
In the 1970s the Republic of China trained Guatemalan officers involved in human rights violations. In 2019 Guatemalan Minister of Defense Major General Luis Miguel Ralda Moreno visited Taiwan and met with Taiwanese President Tsai Ing-wen.

=== Honduras ===
In 2015 Taiwan donated three UH-1H utility helicopters to Honduras.

=== Japan ===
There is no official cooperation between the ROC military and the Japanese Self Defense Force (JSDF). The JSDF has sent observers to the digital part of the annual Han Kuang Exercise. New Japanese military legislation came into effect in 2016, allowing deployment to defend a regional ally under attack. This is thought to be primarily legislation for Japan to deploy to Taiwan in an event of an attack on Taiwan, which in turn threatens Japanese security in its southern islands.

=== Nicaragua ===
In 2019 Taiwan donated five refurbished surplus interceptor boats to the Nicaraguan Armed Forces. The transfer ceremony occurred at the naval forces' 2nd battalion in Puerto Sandino.

=== Paraguay ===
In 2019 Taiwan donated two UH-1H helicopters and 30 Humvees to the Armed Forces of Paraguay. Paraguayan President Mario Abdo Benítez shared pictures of the military aid on the presidential Twitter feed.

=== Singapore ===
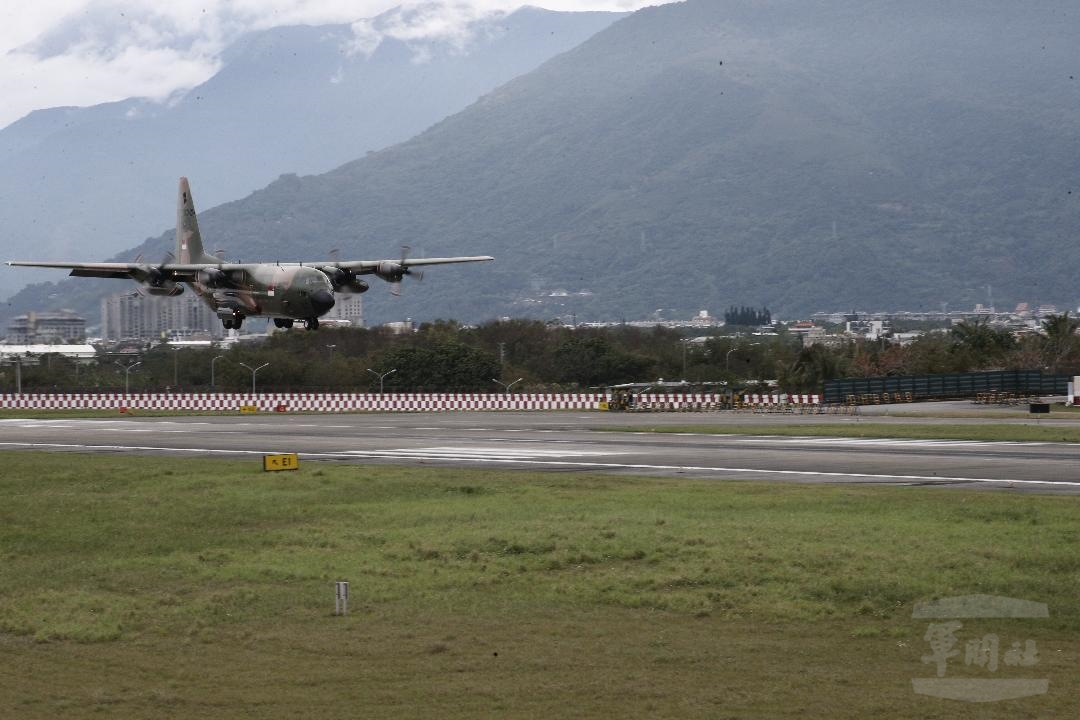
Humanitarian aid sent by a C-130 Hercules of the Republic of Singapore Air Force (RSAF) to Hualien Airport, Taiwan during the 2018 Hualien earthquake.

Starting in 1975, Singapore has sent units from its military to train in the Republic of China under the Starlight training program (星光計畫). Singaporean forces training in Taiwan numbered roughly 3,000 as of 2005. Singapore has also supplied the ROCAF with military equipment.

In 2007, a F-5F fighter operated by the Republic of China Air Force (ROCAF) crashed into base housing that was occupied by Singaporean personnel, killing the pilots. Two Singaporeans on the ground were also killed, with nine injured. The Starlight program at that time numbered around 7,000 personnel.

In 2019, a Singaporean paratrooper was seriously injured during nighttime parachute training. He underwent intensive surgery and recovery in Taiwan. In 2020 he was flown back to Singapore aboard a Singapore Air Force A330 Multi-Role Tanker Transport.

=== United States ===
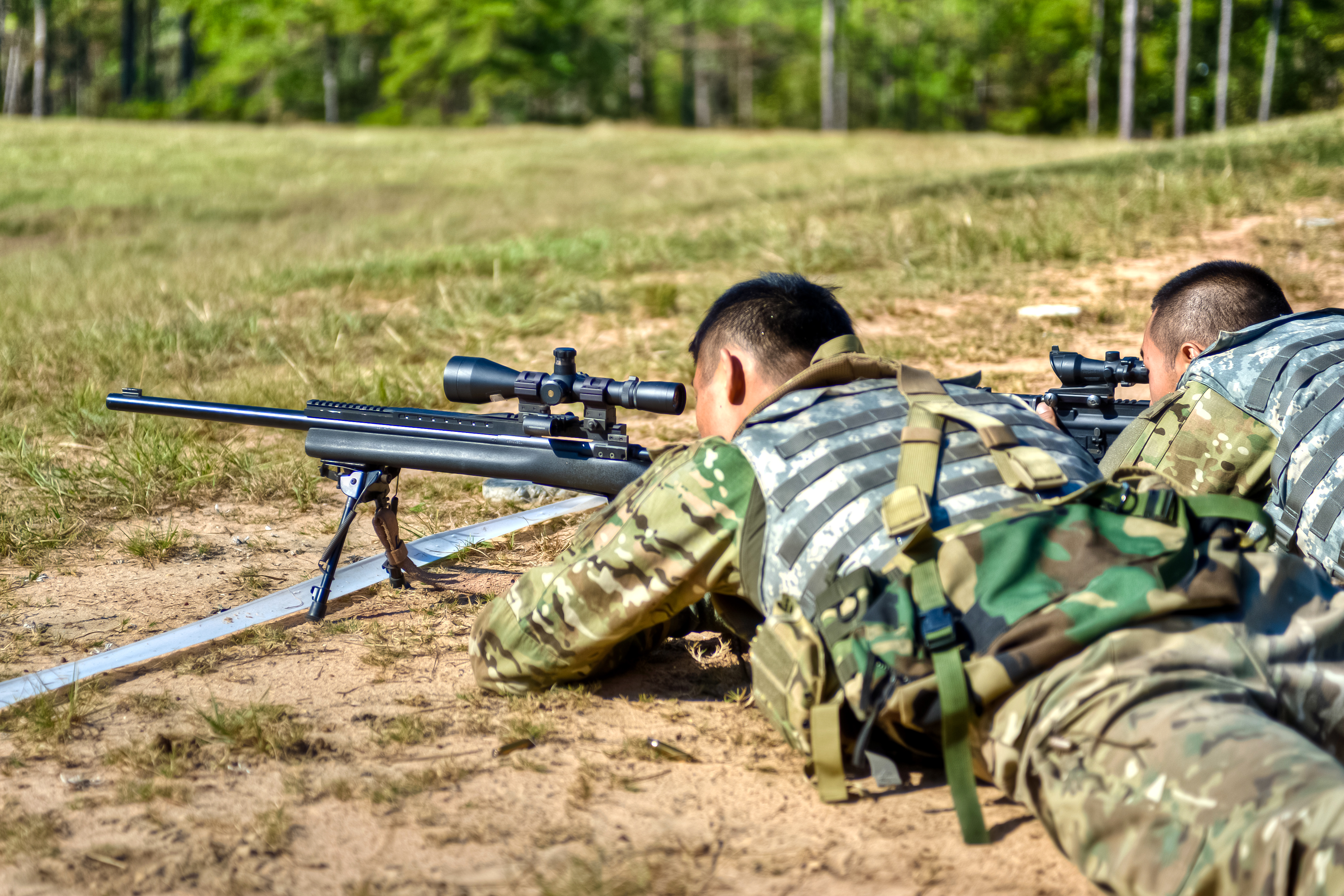
T-93 sniper rifle with the Taiwanese team competing in the International Sniper Competition at Fort Benning, Georgia in 2010

Collaboration between the ROC and US militaries began during World War II when both nations were members of the Allied forces, and continued through the Chinese Civil War when ROC forces were supplied primarily by the US until the final evacuation of ROC forces to Taiwan in 1949. Initially the U.S. expected the ROC government to fall and withdrew support until the outbreak of the Korean War when the U.S. 7th Fleet was ordered to the Taiwan Straits both to protect Taiwan from a PRC attack, and to stop ROC actions against the PRC. A formal US-ROC security pact was signed in 1954 establishing a formal alliance that lasted until US recognition of the PRC in 1979. During this period US military advisers were deployed to the ROC and joint exercises were common. The United States Taiwan Defense Command was established in the Philippines for reinforcement of Taiwan airspace. The US and ROC also collaborated on human and electronic intelligence operations directed against the PRC.

ROC units participated in the Korean War and the Vietnam War in non-combat capacities, primarily at the insistence of the United States which was concerned that the high-profile roles for ROC forces in these conflicts would lead to full scale PRC intervention. The United States deployed nuclear weapons on Taiwan as part of the United States Taiwan Defense Command. Nuclear weapons are known to have been stored at Tainan Air Force Base until their withdrawal was ordered by the American President in 1972. High-level cooperation ended with the US recognition of the PRC in 1979, when all remaining US forces in Taiwan were withdrawn. The US continued to supply the ROC with arms sales per the Taiwan Relations Act, albeit in a diminished role.

When the United States Congress enacted on 30 September 2002, the Foreign Relations Authorization Act for FY 2003, it required that Taiwan be "treated as though it were designated a major non-NATO ally." Despite some initial misgivings about Congress's perceived intrusion into the President's foreign affairs authority, the Bush administration subsequently submitted a letter to Congress on 29 August 2003, designating Taiwan as a major non-NATO ally.

In recent years, the ROC military has again begun higher level cooperation with the United States Armed Forces after over two decades of relative isolation. Senior officers from the U.S. Pacific Command observed the annual Han Kuang military exercises in 2005. The US also upgraded its military liaison position in Taipei from a position held by retired officers hired on a contractual basis to one held by an active duty officer the same year. The United States regularly sends personnel to Taiwan for both training and liaison purposes but does so either secretly or in an unofficial capacity. ROC Marines have trained with their American counterparts in Hawaii and US Marines have also deployed to Taiwan.

In 2015 two United States Marine Corps F/A-18C Hornets made an unscheduled landing at Tainan Air Force Base after one of them developed an engine anomaly in-flight. The aircraft were accommodated in an air force hangar until a C-130 full of American technicians could be flown in to check them out.

Tsai Ing-wen's request of purchasing weaponry from the US was approved by the US State Department in July 2019. The deal includes 108 M1 Abrams tanks, 250 FIM-92 Stinger missiles and related equipment worth $2.2 billion. Tsai said the weaponry would "greatly enhance our land and air capabilities, strengthen military morale and show to the world the US commitment to Taiwan's defense." In May 2020, the U.S. Department of State approved a Foreign Military Sale of 18 MK-48 Mod 6 Advanced Technology Heavy Weight Torpedoes for Taiwan in a deal estimated to cost $180 million.

Elite units of the ROC and American militaries have trained together for a long time, units often have particular relationships for example the MPSSC trains and engages in exercises with United States Army Special Forces. In June 2020 the United States Army Special Forces published a promotional video which included footage of Green Berets training in Taiwan. The ROC Army Aviation and Special Forces Command and the United States Army Special Forces have an annual training exercise called Balance Tamper. The ROC Marines receive training annually from the US Marine Corps' Marine Raider Regiment. The United States Air Force supports Taiwan's air force through air-to-air refuelling and training.

=== West Germany ===
In the 1960s West Germany participated in the Mingteh Project (Ming-teh-Gruppe in German) in which off-duty military officers were sent to Taiwan to advise the government of Chiang Kai-shek.

== Military parades ==
ROC Humvees en route to the 2007 National Day Military Parade

The Republic of China held their first military parade on 10 October 2007 for National Day celebrations since 1991. Previous parades were halted in an effort to ease the tension with the PRC. The parade was aimed at easing worries that the armed forces might be unprepared for a conflict with the PRC. The parade consisted of indigenous missiles, U.S. Patriot II and Avenger anti-missiles systems, U.S.-made F-16s, French-made Mirages and Taiwan-made IDF fighters.

In 2015, another parade was held to mark the 70th anniversary of the defeat of Japan in 1945 in northern Hsinchu county. The parade was long at two hours and consisted of indigenous missiles, Apache helicopters and awards for World War II veterans.

== Major deployments, battles and incidents ==
=== 1912–1949 ===
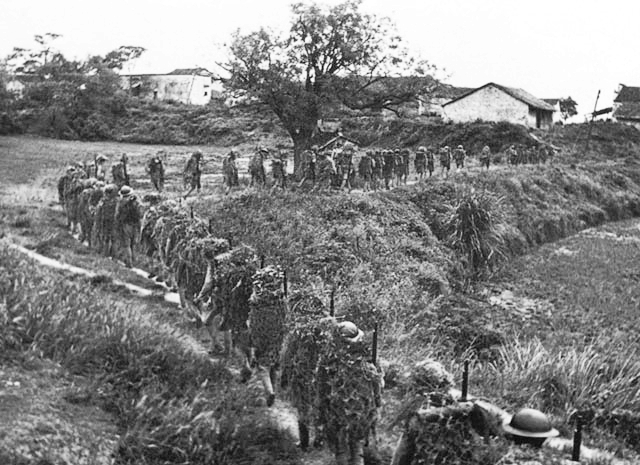
ROC soldiers marching to the front lines in 1939

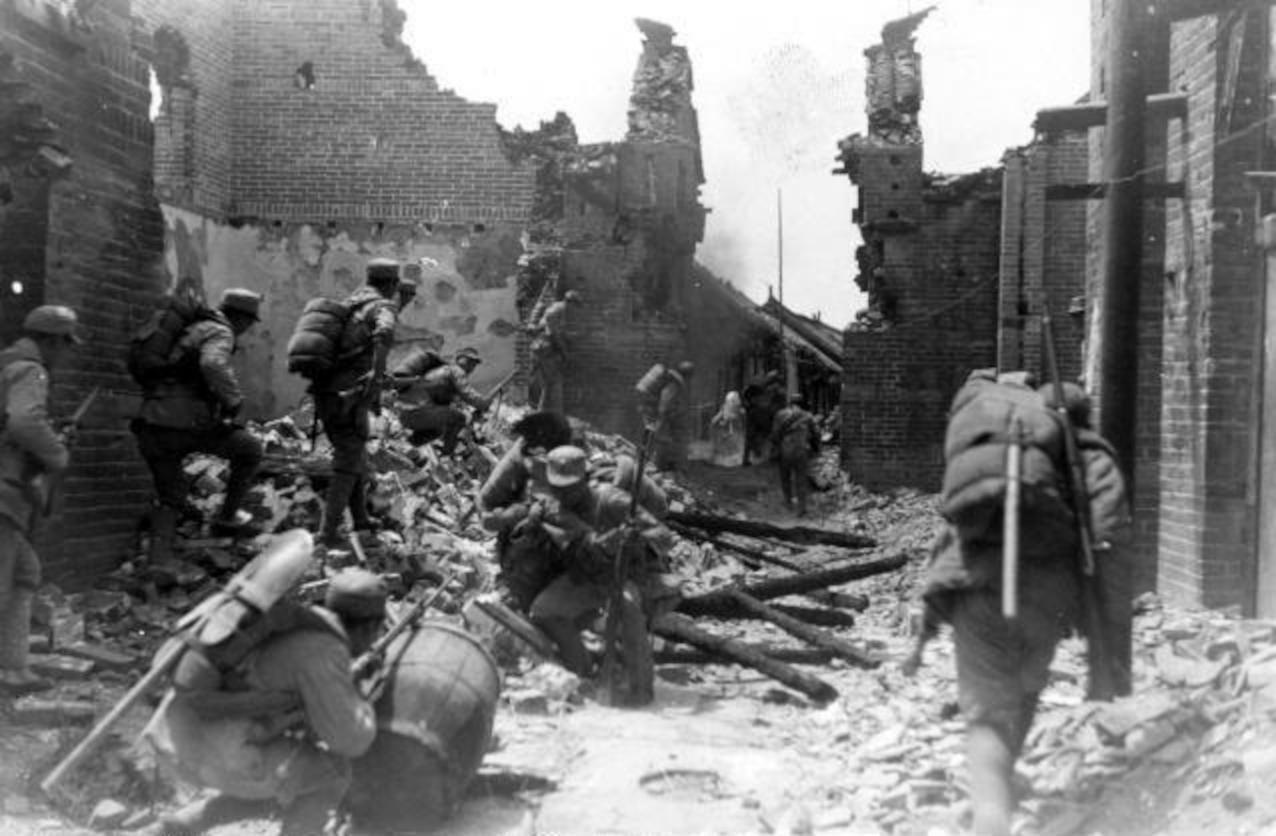
ROC soldiers in house-to-house fighting in Battle of Taierzhuang

- Northern Expedition: 1926–1928
- Central Plains War: May 1930 – 4 November 1930
- First Communist Insurrection/Purge: 1927–1937
  - Nanchang Uprising: 1927
  - Autumn Harvest Uprising: 1927
  - Xi'an Incident: 12 December 1936
- Second Sino-Japanese War/World War II: 1937–1945
  - Marco Polo Bridge Incident: 7 July 1937
  - Battle of Shanghai: 13 August – 9 November 1937
  - Battle of Nanjing: October–December 1937
  - Battle of Taierzhuang: 24 March – April 1938
  - First Battle of Changsha: 17 September – 6 October 1939
  - Second Battle of Changsha: 6 September – 8 October 1941
  - Third Battle of Changsha: 24 December 1941 – 15 January 1942
  - Defense of Sichuan: 1942–1943
  - Battle of Hengyang-Changsha: June 1944 – April 1945
- Chinese Civil War: 1946–1950
  - New Fourth Army Incident: 1940
- February 28 incident: 28 February – March 1947

=== Since 1949 ===
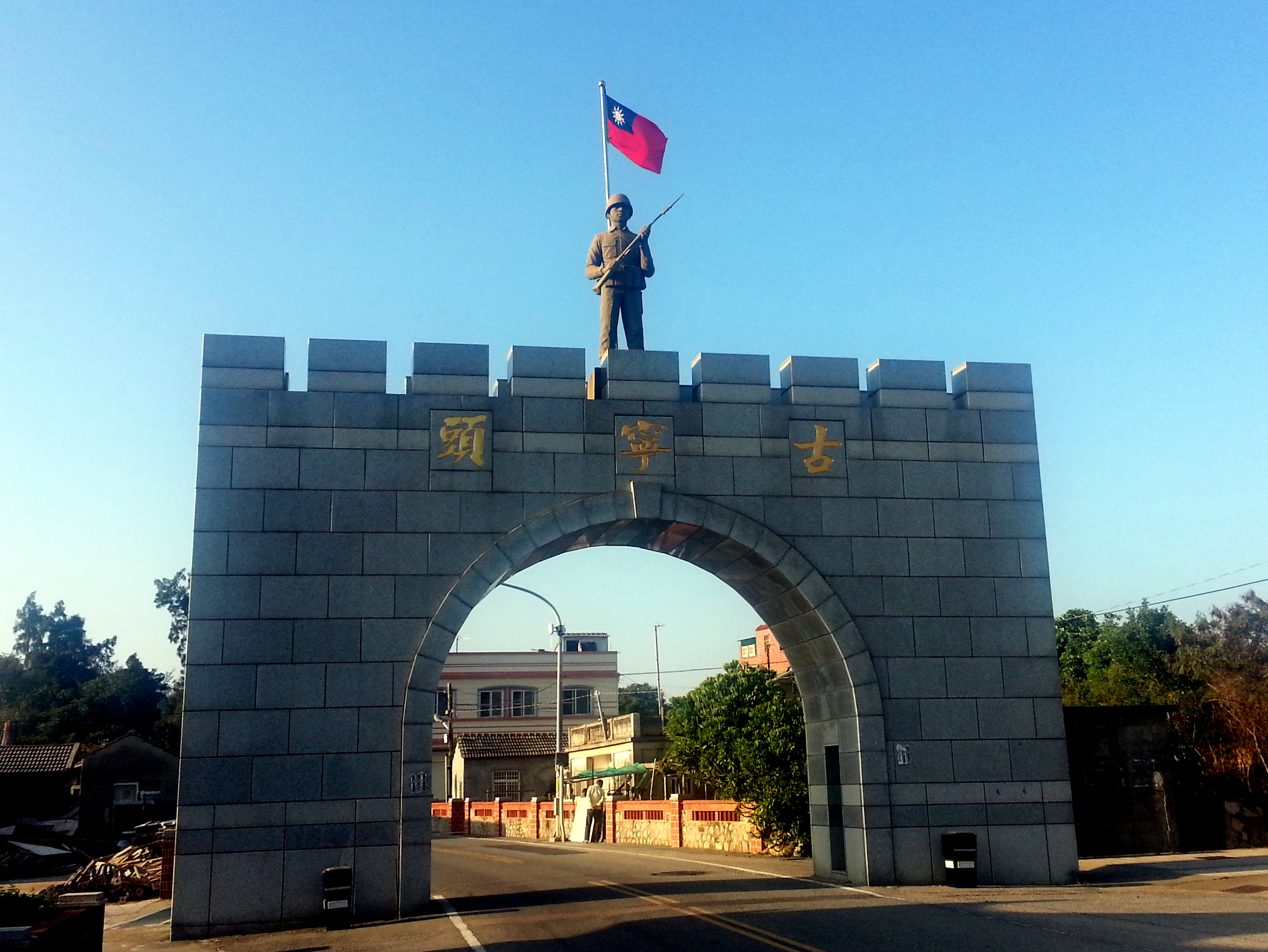
Kuningtou Battle Museum, Kinmen County

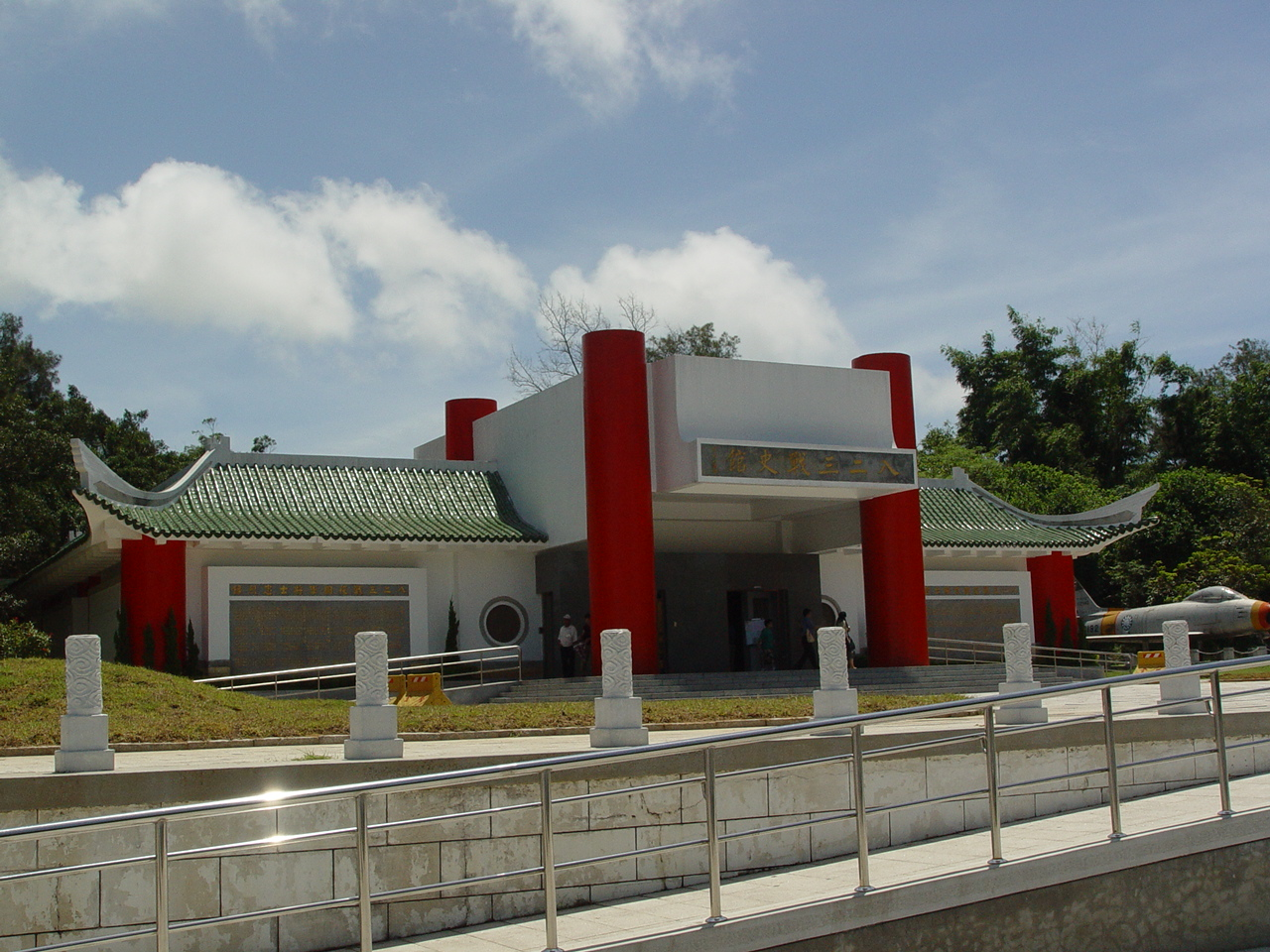
August 23 Artillery Battle Museum, Kinmen County

- Battle of Kuningtou: 25–28 October 1949
- Battle of Dengbu Island: 3–5 November 1949
- Hainan Campaign: 1 March 1950 – 1 May 1950
- First Battle of Dadan island: 26 July 1950
- Korean War: 1950–1953, Translators, cross border raids into southwest China from Burma.
- Battle of Nanri island: 11 – 15 April 1952
- Dongshan Island Campaign: 15 July 1953
- First Taiwan Strait Crisis: August 1954 – May 1955
  - Battle of Yijiangshan: 18 January 1955
  - Tachen Evacuation: 7–11 February 1955
- Second Taiwan Strait Crisis (August 23 Artillery Battle): 23 August – early October 1958
  - Second Battle of Dadan island: 26 August 1958
- Vietnam War: 1960s, Deployment of small groups of ROC troops disguised as locals, transportation, and technical assistance. Not widely publicized to avoid PRC involvement.
- 1960–1961 campaign at the China–Burma border
- Battle of Dong-Yin: 1 May 1965
- Battle of Dongshan: 6 August 1965
- Battle of Wuchow: 13–14 November 1965
- Yemen Civil War: 1979 to 1985: 80+ F-5E pilots plus ground crew sent to North Yemen to boost its air defence at the request of Saudi Arabia and the United States. At least one squadron strength was kept throughout the period, flying North Yemen's F-5E fleet.
- Third Taiwan Strait Crisis: 21 July 1995 – 23 March 1996
- Southeast Asian tsunami relief: January 2005
- Military intervention against ISIL: 13 June 2014 – present (Under CJTF-OIR)

== Nuclear weapons program ==
The development of nuclear weapons by the ROC has been a contentious issue. The U.S., hoping to avoid escalating tensions in the Taiwan Strait, has continually opposed arming the ROC with nuclear weapons. Accordingly, the ROC, although not a member of the United Nations, adheres to the principles of the nuclear Non-Proliferation Treaty and has stated that it does not intend to produce nuclear weapons. Past nuclear research by the ROC makes it a 'threshold' nuclear state.

In 1967, a nuclear weapons program began under the auspices of the Institute of Nuclear Energy Research (INER) at the Chungshan Institute of Science and Technology. The ROC was able to acquire nuclear technology from abroad (including a research reactor from Canada and low-grade plutonium from the United States) allegedly for a civilian energy system, but in actuality to develop fuel for nuclear weapons.

After the International Atomic Energy Agency found evidence of the ROC's efforts to produce weapons-grade plutonium, Taipei agreed in September 1976 under U.S. pressure to dismantle its nuclear weapons program. The nuclear reactor was soon shut down and the plutonium mostly returned to the U.S.

Another secret program was revealed after 1987 Lieyu massacre, when Colonel Chang Hsien-yi, deputy director of Nuclear Research at INER who was secretly working for the CIA, defected to the U.S. in December, and produced a cache of incriminating documents. In 1988 upon being questioned by Director of American Institute in Taiwan, David Dean in person with the United States satellite image recording a minimized nuclear test at Jioupeng military base field in Pingtung in 1986, Superior-general Hau Pei-tsun claimed that scientists in Taiwan had already produced the controlled nuclear reaction as the continuous progress in decades after the previous accomplishment equivalent to 1/6 of Hiroshima scale in South Africa in 1980, as per General Hau's Diary and President Nelson Mandela's later findings. Under pressure from the U.S., the program was halted.

During the 1995–1996 Taiwan Strait crisis, ROC President Lee Teng-hui proposed reactivating the program, but was forced to back down a few days later after drawing intense criticism from the U.S. government.

== Budget ==
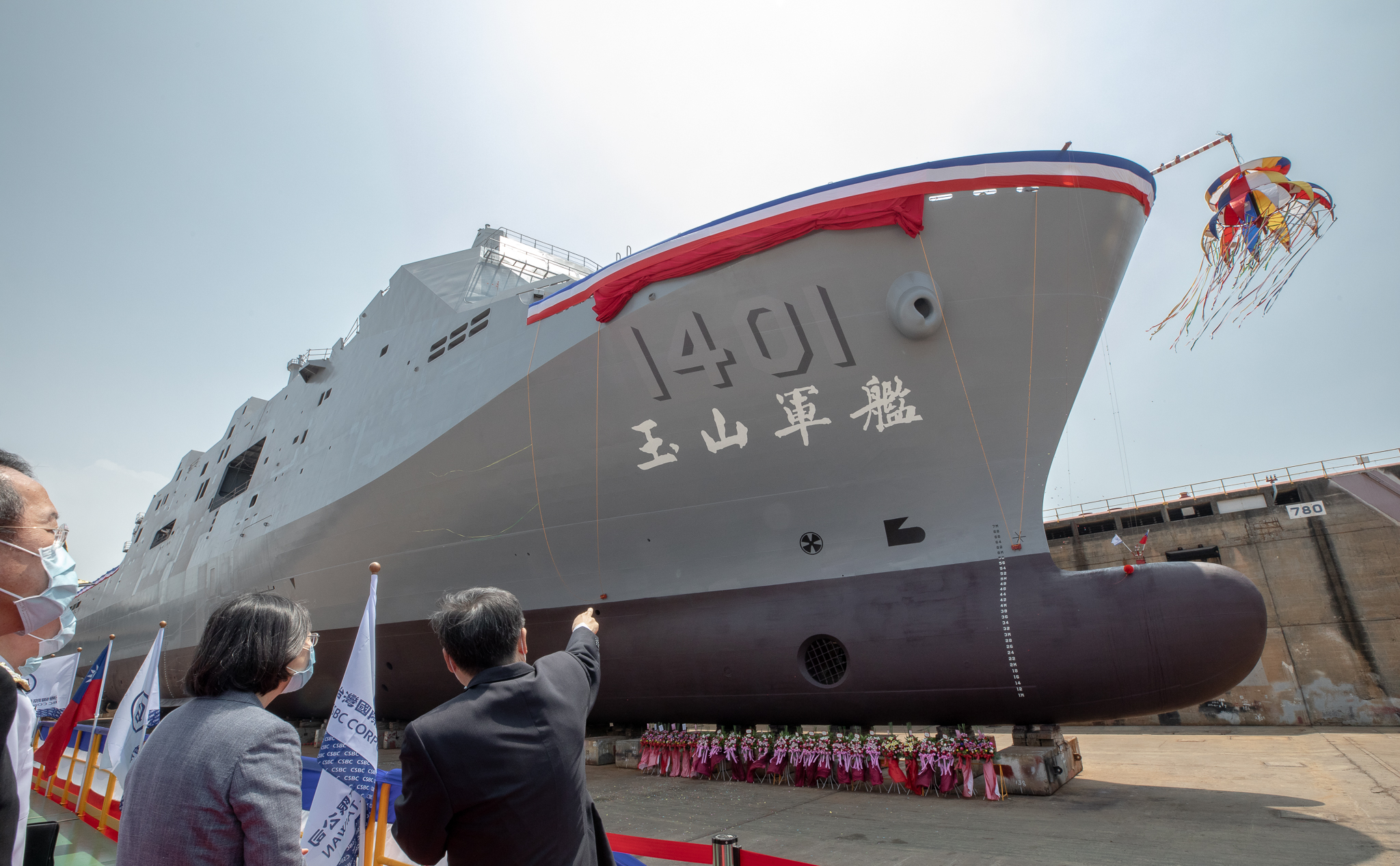
Yushan-class landing platform dock

Taiwan's budget figures exclude both the classified budget and special funds allocated by the Executive Yuan. As of 2020 special funds expenditures were almost 2 billion a year. In 2021 the legislature approved a US$9 billion special budget for weapons and systems procurement.

Taiwan Defense Budget
Year	Nominal	Percentage of GDP
1996	US$9.57 billion	3.6%
1998	US$9.46 billion	3.26%
1999	US$8.89 billion	3.06%
2008	US$10.9 billion	2.94%
2020	US$13.1 billion	2.3%
2021	US$16.2 billion	2.36%
2022	US$18.6 billion	2.2%
2024	US$19.1 billion	2.5%

== See also ==
- Republic of China Armed Forces Museum
- Grey-zone (international relations)
- Airborne Special Service Company
