= Porcupine strategy =

Proposed Taiwanese military doctrine

The porcupine strategy is a proposed military doctrine for the defense of Taiwan in the event of an invasion by the People's Republic of China. The strategy generally calls for an emphasis on fighting an asymmetric war against superior Chinese forces, in contrast with Taiwan's historical tendency to invest in large weapons platforms in the form of ships, aircraft, and tanks. While the doctrine was broadly proposed in the early 2000s, it increased in prominence in the late 2010s when then-chief of defense Admiral Lee Hsi-ming incorporated the principle into a formal strategy he called the Overall Defense Concept, though following his retirement from the post in 2019 Taiwan did not fully embrace the principles.

== History ==
The need for Taiwan to establish a defense strategy based around asymmetrical warfare, as well as the use of the "porcupine" terminology to refer to it, was identified as early as 2008, when William S. Murray, a retired United States Navy officer, published an article in the Naval War College Review advocating for Taiwan to "rethink and redesign its defense strategy" away from outright destruction of an invading force, which he saw as infeasible due to Chinese military advancements, and towards a more general goal of resisting Chinese occupation on the island. Murray argued that improved Chinese precision guided missiles would easily overwhelm major Taiwanese military hardware, including its Patriot surface-to-air missile systems, most if not all airfields, and individual warships. As a result, he advocated for investing in shorter range, person- and vehicle-portable systems such as Stinger and Harpoon missiles, near-shore sea mines, and attack helicopters. Murray used the phrase "porcupine republic" to characterise Taiwan as being able to survive an airborne attack and subsequently resist an amphibious landing of Chinese troops, ideally deterring China by making the costs of such an occupation unacceptable.

Murray's publication did not instigate changes to official Taiwanese strategy, but following Admiral Lee's appointment to defense chief in 2017 he led the development of the Overall Defense Concept, which by 2019 had been endorsed by then-President Tsai Ing-wen. Lee's plan called for increased deployment of short-range missiles and a large number of small naval vessels able to hide among fishing boats, among other asymmetric weapons, but also endorsed the continuing acquisition of major assets such as F-16 fighter aircraft, M1 Abrams battle tanks, and a new class of attack submarines. By this time, other observers had begun to identify weaknesses in the doctrine of continued investment in heavy weaponry, and the 2019 purchase of Abrams tanks from the United States was reported to have been debated within the US government on grounds that a quantity of Chinese armor landed on Taiwan sufficient to require tanks for defense would likely herald an inevitable Chinese occupation regardless of the presence of Taiwanese tanks. The US State Department subsequently informed Taiwan in 2022 that it would refuse to export Seahawk helicopters, citing a lack of strategic value in combat against the Chinese military. Later that year, the US did approve a weapons purchase that included 60 Harpoon missiles for coastal defence.

Following the Russian invasion of Ukraine in 2022, a generally similar conflict between an invading superior force and numerically inferior defenders, American government officials began to more broadly embrace and advocate for the porcupine strategy in light of Ukraine's vigorous and largely successful resistance to Russian occupation. Admiral Lee, however, felt that following his retirement from government service Taiwan had been slow to implement his Overall Defense Concept and had continued its historical trends of mimicking superpower militaries such as the United States in purchasing weapons platforms like warships and heavy armored vehicles.

== Strategic characteristics ==
The porcupine strategy is predicated on the notion that China will never give up its ambition of reunifying China under the control of the Chinese Communist Party, which requires Taiwan to be perpetually prepared for an assault and invasion. To this end, a successful defense of Taiwan requires its military doctrine to be centered around an inevitable occupation attempt instead of an indefinite continuance of the historical grey zone relationship. The porcupine strategy would seek to make such an occupation prohibitively costly to China by engaging in an extended resistance until an expected intervention by the United States or other third party nations.

A Chinese invasion of Taiwan is expected, based on patterns in naval exercises, to include a blockade of the island, requiring Taiwan to acquire and maintain a supply of weapons and ammunition to wage land-based war independently in the weeks following an initial assault. With singular major assets and weapons platforms vulnerable to overwhelming attacks, the defensive strategy revolves around a decentralized network of mobile missile launchers, aerial drones, and other relatively low-cost weapons that are able to evade counterattacks. Instead of traditional Taiwanese doctrine of air and sea superiority, historically reflected in the operation of fighter aircraft and blue-water naval vessels, the philosophy of access denial would be used by means of mining coastal waters and using large fleets of aerial drones to obstruct Chinese military activity.

A series of war games, based on unclassified information and carried out by the US think tank Center for Strategic and International Studies, role playing an amphibious Chinese assault on Taiwan largely endorsed the porcupine strategy. The games found that the Taiwanese navy would be destroyed without making any contribution to the conflict from surface vessels, and the submarine fleet would be gradually defeated through attrition. Aircraft not stored in underground hangars would be destroyed, and surviving aircraft would have little effect even assuming runways remained for them to take off from. The results suggested that anti-ship cruise missiles were the superior weapon for attacking Chinese shipping, and that mobile surface-to-air missiles were both more effective and cheaper than aircraft in projecting aerial power. The games generally showed that a Chinese assault was unlikely to lead to an unambiguously successful occupation, but did find it to be of paramount importance that Taiwan carry out an effective resistance in the early days of a conflict and that the United States intervene as soon as possible to attack the Chinese fleet.

== See also ==
- Geostrategy in Taiwan
- Silicon shield

== Bibliography ==
- Cancian, Mark; Cancian, Matthew; Heginbotham, Eric (2023). The First Battle of the Next War (PDF). Washington, DC: Center for Strategic & International Studies.
- Murray, William S. (2008). "Revisiting Taiwan's Defense Strategy". Naval War College Review. 61 (3).
