= Republic of China Naval Academy =

Military academy in Zuoying, Kaohsiung, Taiwan

- 中華民國海軍軍官學校
- Former names: Chinese Naval Academy
- Type: Naval academy
- Established: 16 June 1946; 80 years ago
- Superintendent: RADM Lin Chung-shing
- Director: Captain Su Chang-chun
- Location: Zuoying, Kaohsiung, Taiwan; 22°42′14″N 120°17′23″E
- Website: Official website

The Republic of China Naval Academy (CNA; Chinese: 中華民國海軍軍官學校; pinyin: Zhōnghuámínguó Hǎijūn Jūnguān Xuéxiào; Pe̍h-ōe-jī: Tiong-hôa Bîn-kok Hái-kun Kun-koaⁿ Ha̍k-hāu) is the naval service academy of the Republic of China (Taiwan), located adjacent to the Zuoying Naval Base (海軍左營基地), Kaohsiung, Taiwan.

== History ==
The academy was originally established as the Chinese Naval Academy at the Gaochang Temple in Shanghai on 16 June 1946. On 1 April 1947, the academy was relocated to Qingdao, Shandong. In April 1949, the academy was again relocated to Xiamen, Fujian and to its present location in Kaohsiung, Taiwan in September in the same year. In 1994, the academy began to recruit female cadets for the first time.

== Academics ==
=== School of Academic Studies ===
- Department of Electrical Engineering
- Department of Applied Science
- Department of Marine Science
- Department of Marine Mechanical Engineering
- Department of Information Management

=== General Education Center ===
- Humanities Section
- Social Science Section

=== School of Military Studies ===
- Tactics Section
- Marine Engineering Section
- Physical Training Section

== Alumni ==
- Jason Yuan, Secretary-General of the National Security Council (2012-2014)
- Huang Shu-kuang, Chief of the General Staff (2020–2021)
- Lee Chung-wei, Minister of Coast Guard Administration (2016–2018)
- Lee Hsi-ming, Chief of the General Staff (2017–2019)
- Pu Tze-chun, Vice Minister of National Defense (2017-2018)
- Tung Hsiang-lung, Minister of Veterans Affairs Council (2013-2016)

== Transportation ==
The academy is accessible West from World Games Station of the Kaohsiung MRT.

== See also ==
- List of universities in Taiwan
  - List of schools in the Republic of China reopened in Taiwan
- Republic of China Navy
- Republic of China Marine Corps
- Republic of China Military Academy
- Republic of China Air Force Academy
