= Minister of National Defense (Taiwan) =

- 中華民國國防部部長
- Flag of the minister of national defense

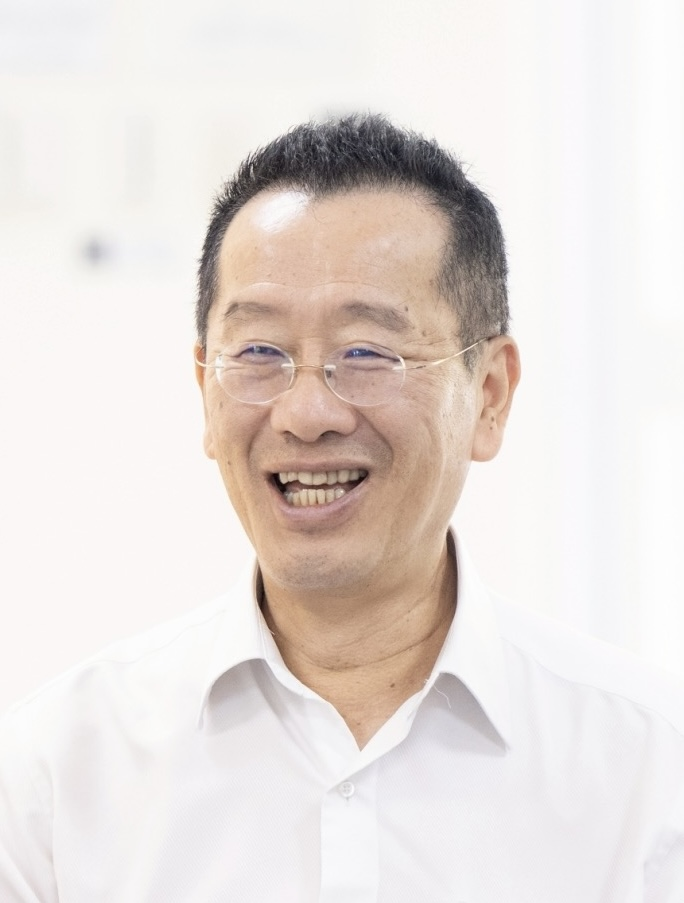
- Incumbent; Wellington Koo since 20 May 2024
- Ministry of National Defense
- Type: Minister
- Member of: Executive Yuan
- Reports to: the Premier
- Seat: Zhongshan, Taipei, Taiwan
- Precursor: Minister of War; Minister of the Navy
- Formation: 23 May 1946; 80 years ago
- First holder: Bai Chongxi
- Website: Official website

The Minister of National Defense (Chinese: 中華民國國防部部長; pinyin: Zhōnghuá mínguó guófáng bù bùzhǎng) is the minister responsible for the Ministry of National Defense. Most ministers were either active or retired military generals, with only four civilians having served as ministers in the post-martial law era.

== List of officeholders ==
The following ministers have served:

No.	Portrait	Name (born–died)	Term of office			Party	Cabinet	Defense branch (before appointment)	Ref.
No.	Portrait	Name (born–died)	Took office	Left office	Time in office	Party	Cabinet	Defense branch (before appointment)	Ref.
1		Bai Chongxi (白崇禧) (1893–1966)	23 May 1946	2 June 1948	2 years, 10 days	Kuomintang	Soong; Zhang; Weng	Army	
2		He Yingqin (何應欽) (1890–1987)	3 June 1948	21 December 1948	201 days	Kuomintang	Weng; Sun II	Army	
3		Xu Yongchang (徐永昌) (1885–1959)	22 December 1948	30 April 1949	129 days	Kuomintang	Sun II; He	Army	
(2)		He Yingqin (何應欽) (1890–1987)	1 May 1949	11 June 1949	41 days	Kuomintang	He; Yan	Army	
4		Yan Xishan (閻錫山) (1883–1960)	12 June 1949	31 January 1950	233 days	Kuomintang	Yan	Army	
5		Gu Zhutong (顧祝同) (1893–1987)	1 February 1950	31 March 1950	58 days	Kuomintang	Yan; C. Chen I	Army	
6		Yu Ta-wei (俞大維) (1897–1993)	1 April 1950	28 February 1951	333 days	Independent	C. Chen I	Army	
7		Kuo Chi-chiao (郭寄嶠) (1902–1998)	1 March 1951	31 May 1954	3 years, 91 days	Kuomintang	C. Chen I	Army	
(6)		Yu Ta-wei (俞大維) (1897–1993)	1 June 1954	13 January 1965	10 years, 226 days	Independent	C. Chen I H. C. Yu; C. Chen II; Yen	Army	
9		Chiang Ching-kuo (蔣經國) (1910–1988)	14 January 1965	30 June 1969	4 years, 167 days	Kuomintang	Yen	Army	
10		Huang Chieh (黃杰) (1902–1995)	1 July 1969	31 May 1972	2 years, 335 days	Kuomintang	Yen; Chiang	Army	
11		Chen Ta-ching (陳大慶) (1904–1973)	1 June 1972	30 June 1973	1 year, 29 days	Kuomintang	Chiang	Army	
12		Kao Kuei-yuan (高魁元) (1907–2012)	1 July 1973	19 November 1981	8 years, 141 days	Kuomintang	Chiang; Sun Y.	Army	
13		Song Chang-chih (宋長志) (1916–2002)	1 December 1981	30 June 1986	4 years, 211 days	Kuomintang	Sun Y. Yu	Navy	
14		Wang Daoyuan (汪道淵) (1913–2011)	1 July 1986	28 April 1987	301 days	Kuomintang	Yu	Civilian	
15		Cheng Wei-yuan (鄭為元) (1913–1993)	29 April 1987	4 December 1989	2 years, 219 days	Kuomintang	Yu; Lee	Army	
16		Hau Pei-tsun (郝柏村) (1919–2020)	5 December 1989	31 May 1991	1 year, 177 days	Kuomintang	Lee	Army	
17		Chen Li-an (陳履安) (born 1937)	1 June 1991	26 February 1993	1 year, 270 days	Kuomintang	Hau	Civilian	
18		Sun Chen (孫震) (born 1934)	27 February 1993	15 December 1994	1 year, 291 days	Kuomintang	Lien	Civilian	
19		Chiang Chung-ling (蔣仲苓) (1922–2015)	16 December 1994	31 January 1999	4 years, 46 days	Kuomintang	Lien; Siew	Army	
20		Tang Fei (唐飛) (born 1932)	1 February 1999	19 May 2000	1 year, 108 days	Kuomintang	Siew	Air force	
21		Wu Shih-wen (伍世文) (born 1934)	20 May 2000	31 January 2002	1 year, 256 days	Kuomintang	T. Fei; C. H. Chang I	Navy	
22		Tang Yao-ming (湯曜明) (1938–2021)	1 February 2002	19 May 2004	2 years, 108 days	Kuomintang (Note: Kuomintang membership suspended.)	Yu	Army	
23		Lee Jye (李傑) (born 1940)	20 May 2004	19 May 2007	2 years, 108 days	Independent (Note: Kuomintang membership revoked.)	Yu; Hsieh; Su I	Navy	
24		Lee Tien-yu (李天羽) (1946–2024)	20 May 2007	24 February 2008	280 days	Kuomintang	Su I C. H. Chang II	Air force	
25		Michael Tsai (蔡明憲) (born 1941)	25 February 2008	19 May 2008	84 days	Democratic Progressive Party	C. H. Chang II	Civilian	
26		Chen Chao-min (陳肇敏) (born 1940)	20 May 2008	9 September 2009	1 year, 112 days	Kuomintang	Liu	Air force	
27		Kao Hua-chu (高華柱) (born 1946)	10 September 2009	31 July 2013	3 years, 324 days	Kuomintang	Wu; S. Chen; Jiang	Army	
28		Andrew Yang (楊念祖) (born 1946)	1 August 2013	7 August 2013	6 days	Kuomintang	Jiang	Civilian	
29		Yen Ming (嚴明) (born 1949)	8 August 2013	30 January 2015	1 year, 175 days	Kuomintang	Jiang; Mao	Air force	
30		Kao Kuang-chi (高廣圻) (born 1950)	31 January 2015	19 May 2016	1 year, 109 days	Kuomintang	Mao; S. Chang	Navy	
31		Feng Shih-kuan (馮世寬) (born 1945)	20 May 2016	26 February 2018	1 year, 282 days	Independent	Lin; Lai	Air force	
32		Yen Teh-fa (嚴德發) (born 1952)	26 February 2018	23 February 2021	2 years, 363 days	Independent	Lai; Su II	Army	
33		Chiu Kuo-cheng (邱國正) (born 1953)	23 February 2021	20 May 2024	3 years, 87 days	Independent	Su II; Chen Chien-jen	Army	
34		Wellington Koo (顧立雄) (born 1958)	20 May 2024	Incumbent	2 years, 111 days	Democratic Progressive Party	Cho	Civilian	
