= Commander of the Army (Republic of China) =

- 中華民國陸軍司令
- Republic of China Army Logo

- Standard of the Commander of the Army

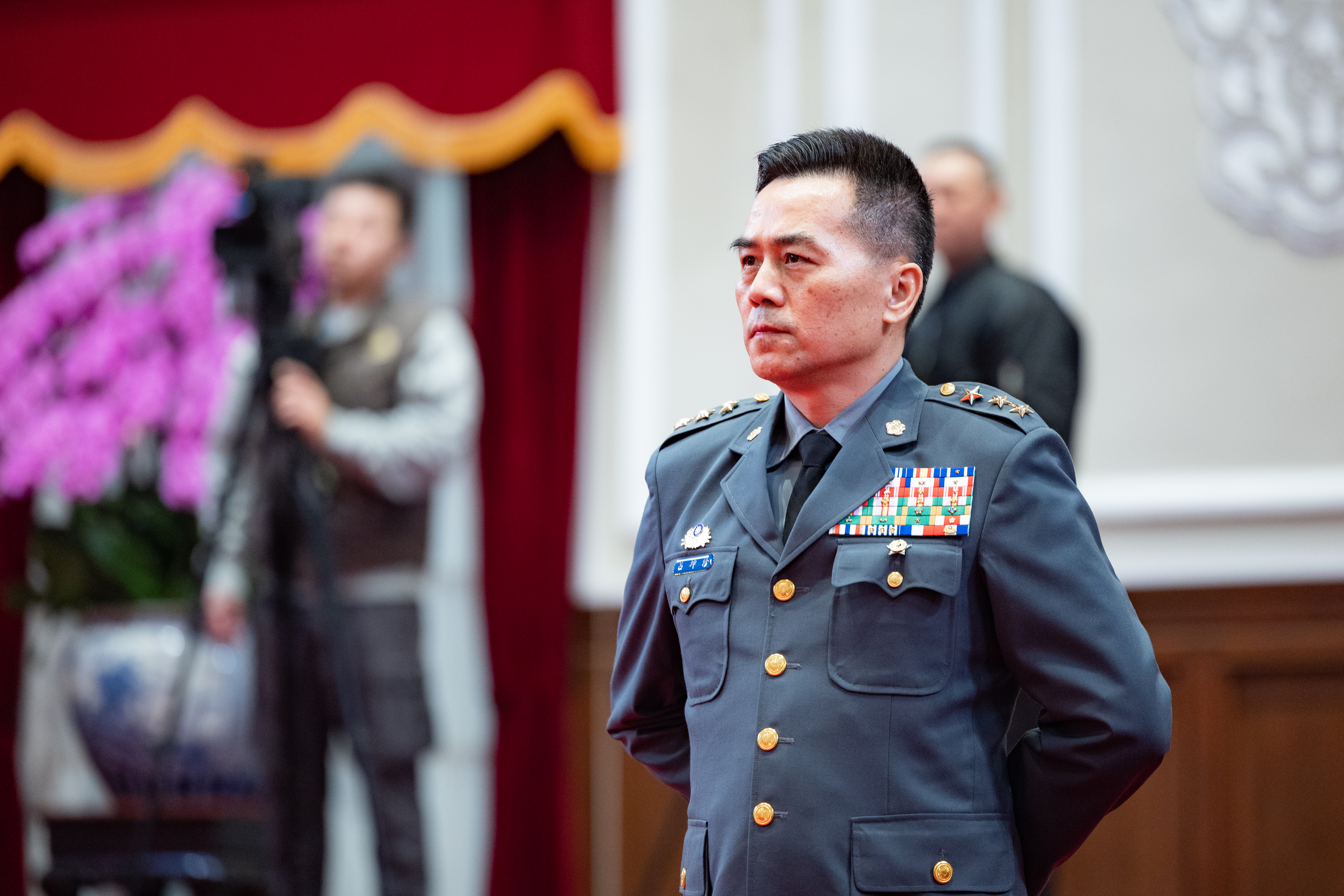
- Incumbent; Lu Kun-hsiu since 16 January 2025
- Republic of China Army
- Member of: General Staff Headquarters
- Reports to: Chief of the General Staff
- Formation: 3 January 1912
- First holder: Huang Xing

The Commander of the Army is the highest-ranking military officer and commander of the Republic of China Army. The current Commander is Lu Kun-hsiu.

== List of Chiefs ==
=== Commander-in-Chief of the Army (1946–2006) ===
No.	Portrait	Chief of the General Staff	Took office	Left office	Time in office	Ref.
1	Gu Zhutong	General; Gu Zhutong (1893–1987)	1 June 1946	13 May 1948	1 year, 347 days	–
2	Yu Hanmou	General; Yu Hanmou (1896–1981)	13 May 1948	9 February 1949	272 days	–
3	Zhang Fakui	General; Zhang Fakui (1896–1980)	9 February 1949	26 June 1949	137 days	–
(1)	Gu Zhutong	General; Gu Zhutong (1893–1987)	26 June 1949	25 August 1949	60 days	–
4	Guan Linzheng	General; Guan Linzheng (1905–1980)	25 August 1949	December 1949	98 days	–
(1)	Gu Zhutong	General; Gu Zhutong (1893–1987)	December 1949	March 1950	90 days	–
5	Sun Li-jen	General; Sun Li-jen (1900–1990)	March 1950	June 1954	4 years, 92 days	–
6	Huang Chieh	General; Huang Chieh (1902–1995)	June 1954	July 1957	3 years, 30 days	–
7	Peng Mengji [zh]	General; Peng Mengji (1908–1997)	July 1957	June 1959	1 year, 335 days	–
8	Luo Lie [zh]	General; Luo Lie (1907–1976)	June 1959	August 1961	2 years, 61 days	–
9	Liu An-chi [zh]	General; Liu An-chi (1903–1995)	August 1961	August 1965	4 years, 0 days	–
10	Kao Kuei-yuen [zh]	General; Kao Kuei-yuen (1907–2012)	August 1965	June 1967	1 year, 304 days	–
11	Chen Ta-ching	General; Chen Ta-ching (1904–1973)	July 1967	June 1969	1 year, 335 days	–
12	Yu Hao-chang [zh]	General; Yu Hao-chang (1918–1999)	July 1969	March 1975	5 years, 243 days	–
13	Ma An-lan [zh]	General; Ma An-lan (1916–2001)	March 1975	March 1978	3 years, 0 days	–
14	Hau Pei-tsun	General; Hau Pei-tsun (1919–2020)	March 1978	November 1981	3 years, 245 days	–
15	Chiang Chung-ling	General; Chiang Chung-ling (1922–2015)	November 1981	June 1988	6 years, 213 days	–
16	Huang Hsin-chiang [zh]	General; Huang Hsin-chiang (born 1931)	June 1988	July 1991	3 years, 30 days	–
17	Chen Ting-chong [zh]	General; Chen Ting-chong (born 1931)	July 1991	July 1993	2 years, 0 days	–
18	Lee Chen-lin [zh]	General; Lee Chen-lin (born 1933)	July 1993	July 1996	3 years, 0 days	–
19	Tang Yao-ming	Senior General; Tang Yao-ming (1940–2021)	July 1996	January 1999	2 years, 215 days	–
19	Chen Chen-hsiang	General; Chen Chen-hsiang (born 1942)	1 February 1999	31 January 2002	2 years, 364 days	–
20	Huoh Shoou-yeh [zh]	Senior General; Huoh Shoou-yeh (born 1943)	31 January 2002	19 May 2004	2 years, 109 days	–
21	Chu Kai-sheng [zh]	General; Chu Kai-sheng (born 1945)	20 May 2004	15 February 2006	1 year, 271 days	–

=== Commander of the Army (2006–present) ===
No.	Portrait	Chief of the General Staff	Took office	Left office	Time in office	Ref.
1	Hu Chen-pu	General; Hu Chen-pu (born 1948)	16 February 2006	31 January 2007	349 days	–
2	Chao Shi-chang [zh]	General; Chao Shi-chang (born 1967)	1 February 2007	4 February 2009	2 years, 3 days	–
3	Yang Tian-hsiao [zh]	General; Yang Tian-hsiao (born 1950)	5 February 2009	15 August 2011	2 years, 191 days	–
4	Lee Shying-jow	General; Lee Shying-jow (born 1952)	16 August 2011	15 January 2014	2 years, 152 days	
5	Yen Teh-fa	General; Yen Teh-fa (born 1952)	16 January 2014	29 January 2015	1 year, 13 days	–
6	Chiu Kuo-cheng	General; Chiu Kuo-cheng (born 1953)	30 January 2015	30 November 2016	1 year, 305 days	–
7	Wang Shin-lung	General; Wang Shin-lung (born 1960)	1 December 2016	31 March 2019	2 years, 120 days	
8	Chen Pao-yu	General; Chen Pao-yu (born 1958)	1 April 2019	30 June 2021	2 years, 90 days	
9	Hsu Yen-pu	General; Hsu Yen-pu (born 1961)	1 July 2021	30 April 2023	1 year, 303 days	
10	Chung Shu-ming [zh]	General; Chung Shu-ming (born 1964)	1 May 2023	15 January 2025	1 year, 259 days	
11	Lu Kun-hsiu [zh]	General; Lu Kun-hsiu (born 1966)	16 January 2025		1 year, 234 days	–

== See also ==
- Chief of the General Staff (Republic of China)
- Commander of the Navy (Taiwan)
