= JTS =

JTS may refer to:

- Alfa Romeo JTS engine, an automobile engine
- Java Topology Suite (JTS Topology Suite), a software library
- Janesville Transit System, Wisconsin, US
- Jakarta Taipei School, Indonesia
- Java transaction service, a software library
- Jewish Theological Seminary of America, New York City
- Jimmy Two-Shoes, a Canadian animated series
- Journal of Transatlantic Studies
- Journal of Traumatic Stress, US
- JT Storage, a former US hard drive manufacturer
- Jabhat Tahrir Souriya (Syrian Liberation Front), an Islamist group in the Syrian Civil War
