= Yen Ming =

- 嚴明
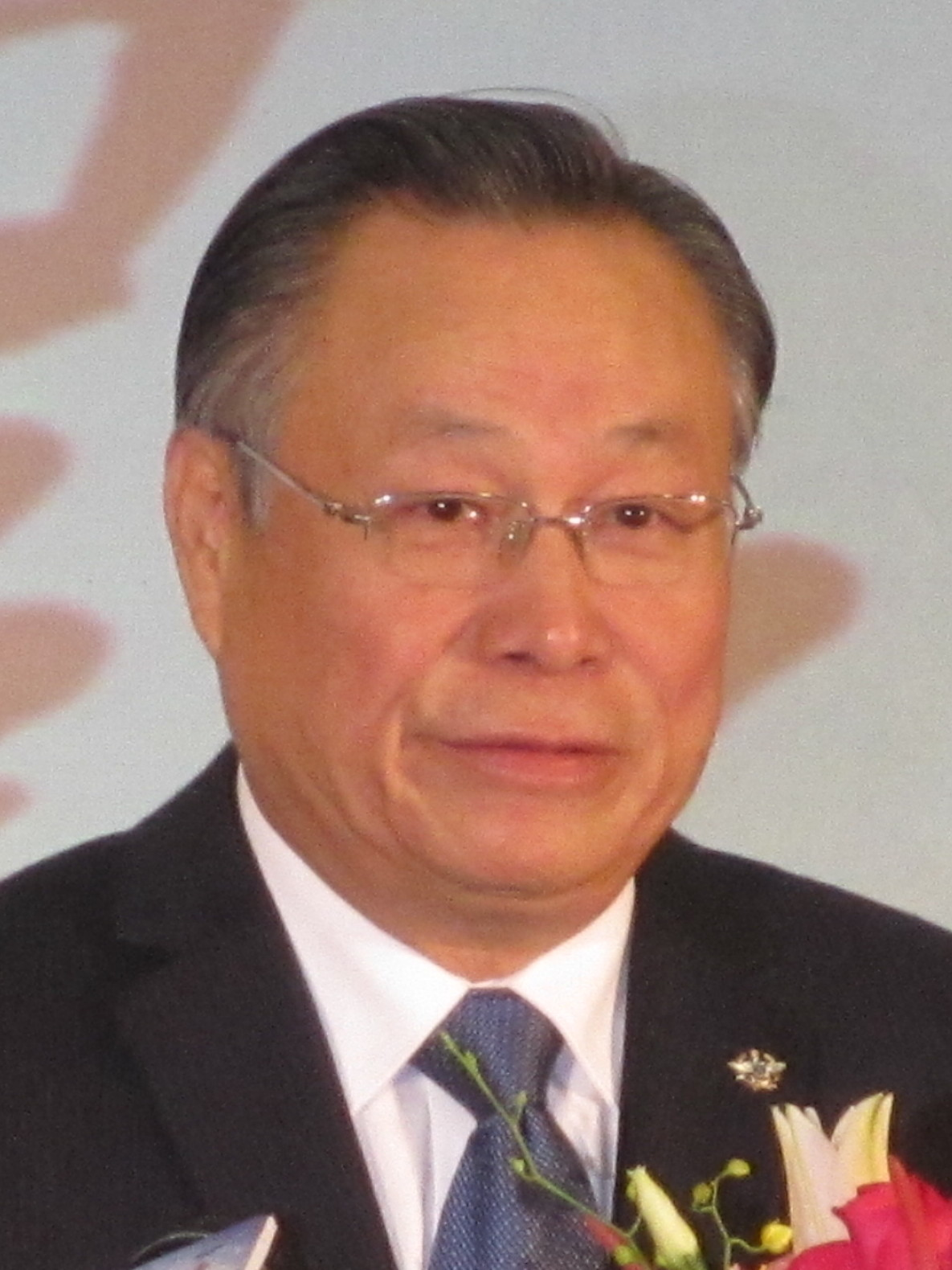

30th Minister of National Defense of the Republic of China
- In office 8 August 2013 – 30 January 2015
- President: Ma Ying-jeou
- Deputy: Yen Teh-fa, Lee Shying-jow, Chiu Kuo-cheng, Andrew Hsia
- Preceded by: Andrew Yang; Kao Kuang-chi (acting)
- Succeeded by: Kao Kuang-chi

22nd Chief of the General Staff of the Republic of China Armed Forces
- In office 16 January 2013 – 7 August 2013
- Preceded by: Lin Chen-yi
- Succeeded by: Kao Kuang-chi

4th Commander of the Republic of China Air Force
- In office June 2011 – 15 January 2013
- Preceded by: Lei Yu-chi
- Succeeded by: Liu Chen-wu

Personal details
- Born: 14 November 1949 (age 76) Yunlin, Taiwan
- Education: Republic of China Air Force Academy (BS); National Defense University

Military service
- Allegiance: Republic of China
- Branch/service: Republic of China Air Force
- Years of service: 1971–2013
- Rank: General
- Battles/wars: Third Taiwan Strait Crisis

Yen Ming (left) and Hsiao Wei-min (right) in Legislative Yuan

Yen Ming (traditional Chinese: 嚴明; simplified Chinese: 严明; pinyin: Yán Míng; born 14 November 1949) was the Minister of National Defense of the Republic of China (Taiwan) from 8 August 2013 to 30 January 2015.

== Education ==
Yen graduated from the Republic of China Air Force Academy in Kaohsiung.

== Early career ==
Upon graduation, Yen worked his way through the Republic of China Air Force, serving as a wing commander, president of Air Force Academy, Air Force chief of staff and Air Force deputy commanding general.

== ROC Air Force General ==
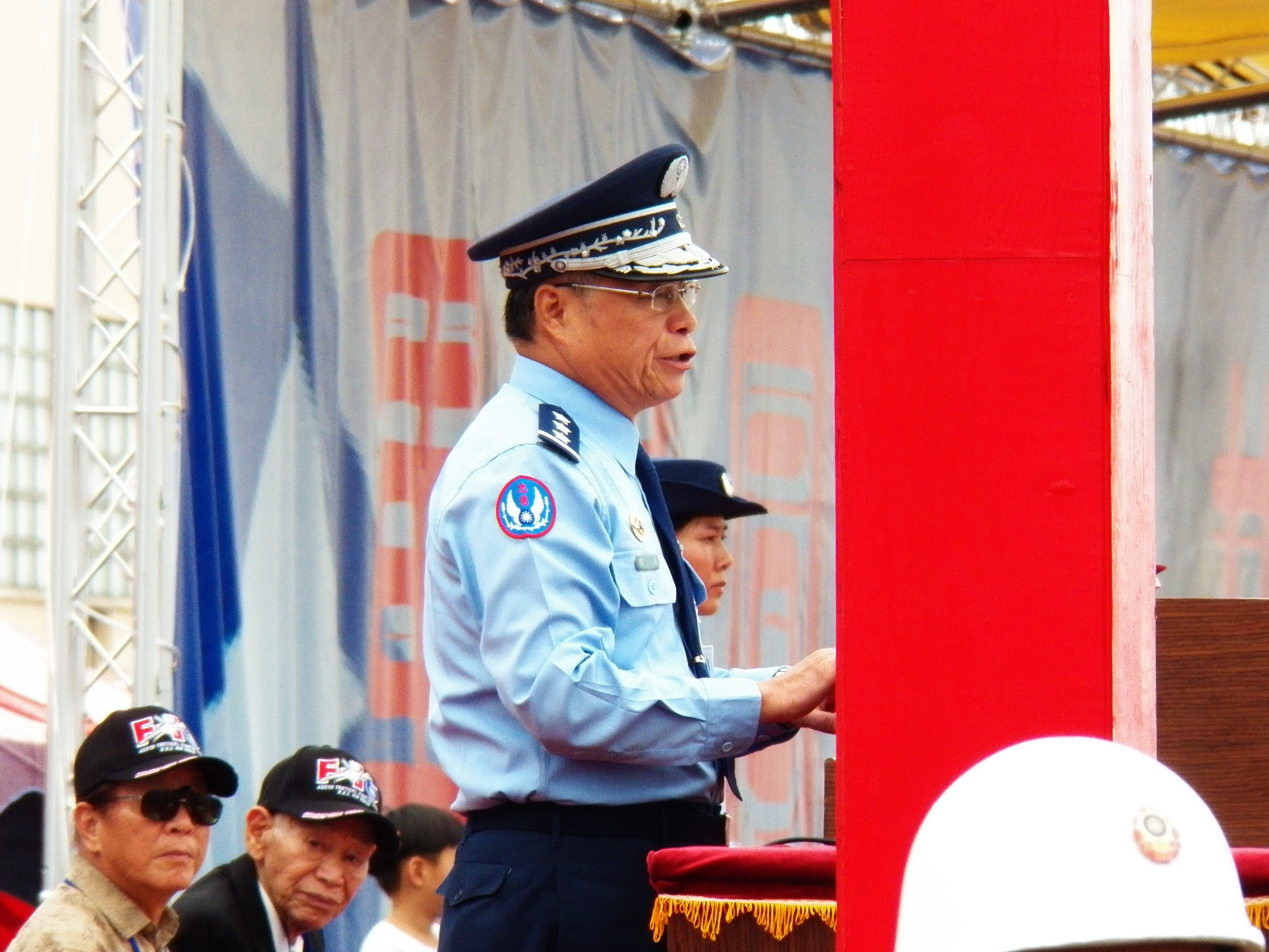
Yen Ming as the Commander of the ROC Air Force

=== General position appointment ===
In October 2008, Yen was promoted as the General of the Air Force.

== ROC Armed Forces Chief of the General Staff ==
=== Chief of the General Staff position appointment ===
On 3 January 2013, the Ministry of the Interior announced that President Ma Ying-jeou had approved the appointment of Yen to the position of Chief of the General Staff of the Republic of China Armed Forces. He would replace Lin Chen-yi who was appointed as the military strategy adviser to the President.

== ROC Minister of National Defense ==
=== Ministry position appointment ===
Yen replaces acting Defense Minister Kao Kuang-chi after the sudden resignation of Defense Minister Andrew Yang, just 6 days after taking his office after the previous Defense Minister Kao Hua-chu's resignation due to the death scandal of Corporal Hung Chung-chiu.

The Executive Yuan officially appointed him on 8 August 2013 from his previous post as ROC Chief of the General Staff. Acting Defense Minister Kao Kuang-chi replaces his position as the ROC Chief of the General Staff.

=== Taiwanese woman abduction in Malaysia ===
Commenting on the recent abduction incident over a Taiwanese female in Sabah, Malaysia, Yen said that although the ROC Ministry of National Defense (MND) has the capability of special forces to save the woman, but then those armed forces are reserved for the use of armed conflict between nation, and MND should not step into an international incident which is the ROC Ministry of Foreign Affairs (MOFA) should do. Overseas special forces deployment will only be possible if there is a mutual treaty between the ROC and the host country.

== Criticism ==
=== Disarmaments of the ROC Marine Corps cause Veterans' protests ===
In mid January 2014, Yen announced that the government plan to cut the number of military to below 200,000 personnel by the end of 2019 to adjust the organization and restructure the armed forces, in which the goal is to make ROC military to be small but elite, small but skillful and small but strong.
