= Ahmed Bey Sofwan =

Indonesian diplomat

Ahmed Bey Sofwan was the first ambassador of Indonesia in Timor Leste.

Sofwan previously worked in the Indonesian Economic and Trade Office in Taipei. He was nominated to the ambassadors post in 2003, and appointed 29 July.
