= Kao Kuang-chi =

Taiwanese politician

- 高廣圻
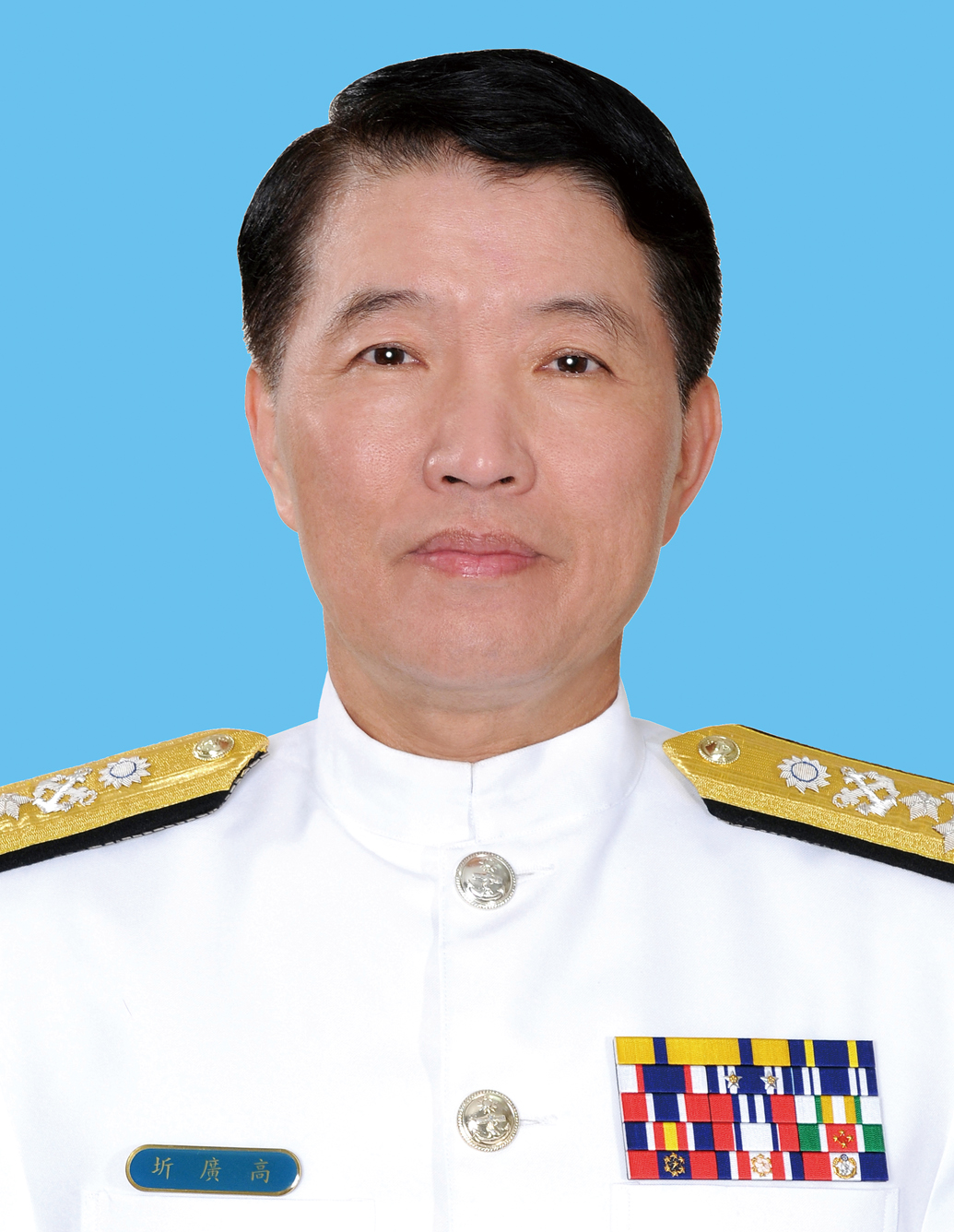
- Kao in 2008

31st Minister of National Defense of the Republic of China
- In office 31 January 2015 – 20 May 2016
- Deputy: Liu Chen-wu, Cheng Te-mei, Chen Yeong-kang
- Preceded by: Yen Ming
- Succeeded by: Feng Shih-kuan

23rd Chief of the General Staff of the Republic of China Armed Forces
- In office 8 August 2013 – 30 January 2015
- Preceded by: Yen Ming
- Succeeded by: Yen Teh-fa
Further information
Acting Minister of National Defense of the Republic of China
In office 7 August 2013 – 7 August 2013
Preceded by	Andrew Yang
Succeeded by	Yen Ming
5th Deputy Minister (Armaments) of National Defense of the Republic of China
In office 1 September 2012 – 6 August 2013
Minister	Kao Hua-chu; Andrew Yang
Preceded by	Chao Shih-chan
Succeeded by	Yen Teh-fa
26th Executive Vice Chief of the General Staff of the Republic of China Armed Forces
In office 16 May 2011 – 1 September 2012
Deputy	Lei Yu-chi; Lee Shying-jow; Liu Chen-wu; Yen Teh-fa
Chief	Lin Chen-yi
Preceded by	Wu Ta-peng
Succeeded by	Chen Yeong-kang
3rd Commander of the Republic of China Navy
In office 21 May 2009 – 16 May 2011
Preceded by	Wang Li-sheng
Succeeded by	Tung Hsiang-lung

Personal details
- Born: 9 March 1950 (age 76) Taiwan
- Education: Republic of China Naval Academy (BS); Florida Institute of Technology (MBA); Naval War College (MS)

Military service
- Allegiance: Republic of China
- Branch/service: Republic of China Navy
- Years of service: 1972–2015
- Rank: Admiral
- Battles/wars: Third Taiwan Strait Crisis

Kao Kuang-chi (traditional Chinese: 高廣圻; simplified Chinese: 高广圻; pinyin: Gāo Guǎngqí; born 9 March 1950) is a Taiwanese politician. He was a retired admiral of the Republic of China Navy, and later entered the cabinet as Minister of National Defense from 2015 to 2016.

After graduating from the Republic of China Navy in 1973, Kao earned an M.B.A. from the Florida Institute of Technology and his M.S. from the U.S. Naval War College.

He was the acting Minister of National Defense from 7 August 2013 after the sudden resignation of Defense Minister Andrew Yang, just six days after taking his office after the previous Defense Minister Kao Hua-chu's resignation due to the controversial death of Corporal Hung Chung-chiu.

Kao Kuang-chi was succeeded by Yen Ming after his official appointment by the Executive Yuan on 8 August 2013. Kao Kuang-chi replaced Yen as the ROC Chief of the General Staff on 8 August 2013.

Kao submitted his resignation on 8 April due to the Boeing AH-64 Apache scandal in Taiwan. However, his resignation was rejected by President Ma Ying-jeou.

== Minister of National Defense ==
Kao was inaugurated as the Minister of National Defense on 30 January 2015 in a ceremony presided by Minister without Portfolio Lin Junq-tzer in Taipei. During the handover ceremony, Lin praised his predecessor accomplishments during Yen's tenure in pushing for complete military judicial system reforms and for better protecting human rights protection of military personnel.
