= Chang Guan-chung =

Military personnel of Taiwan

- 張冠群
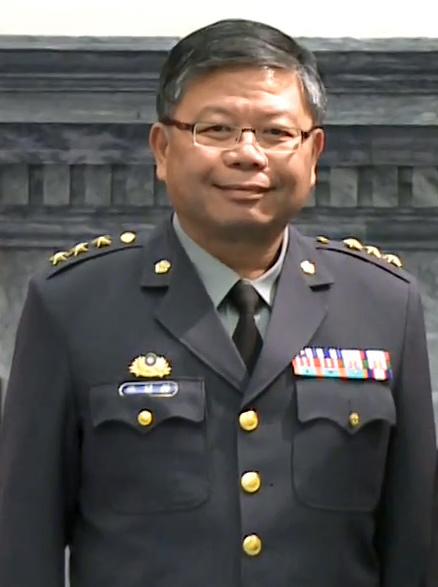
- General Chang Guan-chung

Vice Minister (Armaments), Ministry of National Defense of the Republic of China
- In office 28 April 2017 – 1 July 2021
- Minister: Feng Shih-kuan; Yen Teh-fa
- Preceded by: Cheng Te-mei
- Succeeded by: Wang Shin-lung

Personal details
- Born: 1958 (age 67–68) Taipei, Taiwan
- Education: National Defense University (BE); National Cheng Kung University (MS); Cornell University (PhD)

Military service
- Branch/service: Republic of China Army (ROCA)
- Years of service: 1981-
- Rank: General

Chang Guan-chung (traditional Chinese: 張冠群; simplified Chinese: 张冠群; pinyin: Zhāng Guānqún; born 1958) is a Taiwanese engineer and general officer of the Republic of China Army (ROCA). He was the Vice Minister of National Defense for Armaments from 28 April 2017 to 1 July 2021.

== Early life and education ==
Chang was born in Taipei in 1958. He graduated from National Defense University with a Bachelor of Engineering (B.E.) in 1981 and earned a Master of Science (M.S.) in aerospace engineering from National Cheng Kung University in 1981. He then earned his Ph.D. in aeronautical engineering from Cornell University in 1995. His doctoral dissertation, completed under Stephen B. Pope, was titled, "A Monte Carlo PDF/finite-volume study of turbulent flames".

== National Chung-Shan Institute of Science and Technology ==
In February 2017, Chang, as the President of National Chung-Shan Institute of Science and Technology, signed a memorandum with the Ministry of National Defense in Taichung to develop next-generation advanced jet trainers in Taiwan in which the development program will be completed by 2026.

== Ministry of National Defense ==
Chang took office as the Vice Minister of National Defense for Armaments on 28 April 2017. He is the first academic to serve in this post. He was the opening speaker at U.S.-Taiwan Defense Industry Conference 2018 in Maryland where he spoke on the need for Taiwan to balance foreign and domestic defense suppliers. Chen stepped down from his position at the Ministry of National Defense on 1 July 2021 to work in the Presidential Office as a military strategy adviser, and was awarded the Order of the Cloud and Banner.
