= Hsu Yen-pu =

Vice Minister of National Defense of the Republic of China

- 徐衍璞
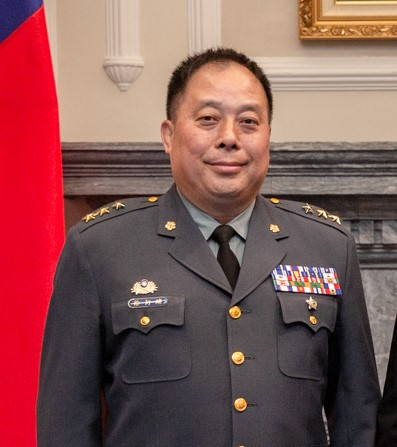

Vice Minister (Armaments), Ministry of National Defense of the Republic of China
- In office 1 May 2023 – 16 January 2025
- Preceded by: Wang Shin-lung
- Succeeded by: Chung Shu-ming

9th Commander of the Republic of China Army
- In office 1 July 2021 – 30 April 2023
- Preceded by: Chen Pao-yu
- Succeeded by: Chung Shu-ming

33rd Deputy Chief of Staff of the Republic of China Armed Forces
- In office 16 January 2020 – 30 June 2021
- Preceded by: Liu Chih-pin
- Succeeded by: Mei Chia-shu

Personal details
- Born: 1961 (age 64–65) Taipei County, Republic of China
- Education: Republic of China Military Academy; National Defense University

Military service
- Allegiance: Republic of China
- Branch/service: Republic of China Army
- Years of service: 1983–2025
- Rank: General

Hsu Yen-pu (Chinese: 徐衍璞; pinyin: Xú Yǎnpú; born 1961) is a Republic of China Army general. Since 1 May 2023, he is the current Vice Minister of the Ministry of National Defense. Hsu previously served as the Commander of the Republic of China Army from 2021 to 2023. He also served as the Deputy Chief of Staff of the Republic of China Armed Forces from 2020 to 2021.

== Career ==
Hsu is of mixed Atayal and Han descent. He is the first commander of the army with Taiwanese indigenous ancestry. In 1983, he graduated from the Artillery Division of the Republic of China Military Academy, and subsequently served in other military positions, including the commander of the No. 21 Artillery Command and commander of the Lanyang Area Command of the Sixth Army Corps, Chief of Staff of the Tenth Army Corps, and Vice Minister of National Defense.

In 2014, Hsu was promoted from major general to lieutenant general. On 1 April of that year, he became the Commander of the Sixth Army Corps following the retirement of Jen Chi-nan.

On 15 January 2020, the Ministry of National Defense announced that Hsu would be transferred to be the Deputy Chief of Staff of the Republic of China Armed Forces. The changes took effect on 16 January. On 17 January, Hsu was personally awarded the rank by President Tsai Ing-wen in a ceremony.

On 1 July 2021, Hsu became the Commander of the Army.

On 18 April 2023, the Minister of National Defense announced that with the approval of Tsai Ing-wen, Hsu would be transferred to the post of the Vice Minister. The change was effective 1 May.

== Awards ==
- Order of the Sacred Tripod with Special Cravat
- Order of the Resplendent Banner with Yellow Grand Cordon
- Order of the Resplendent Banner with Grand Cordon
