= Liu Chen-wu =

Former Taiwanese general

- 劉震武
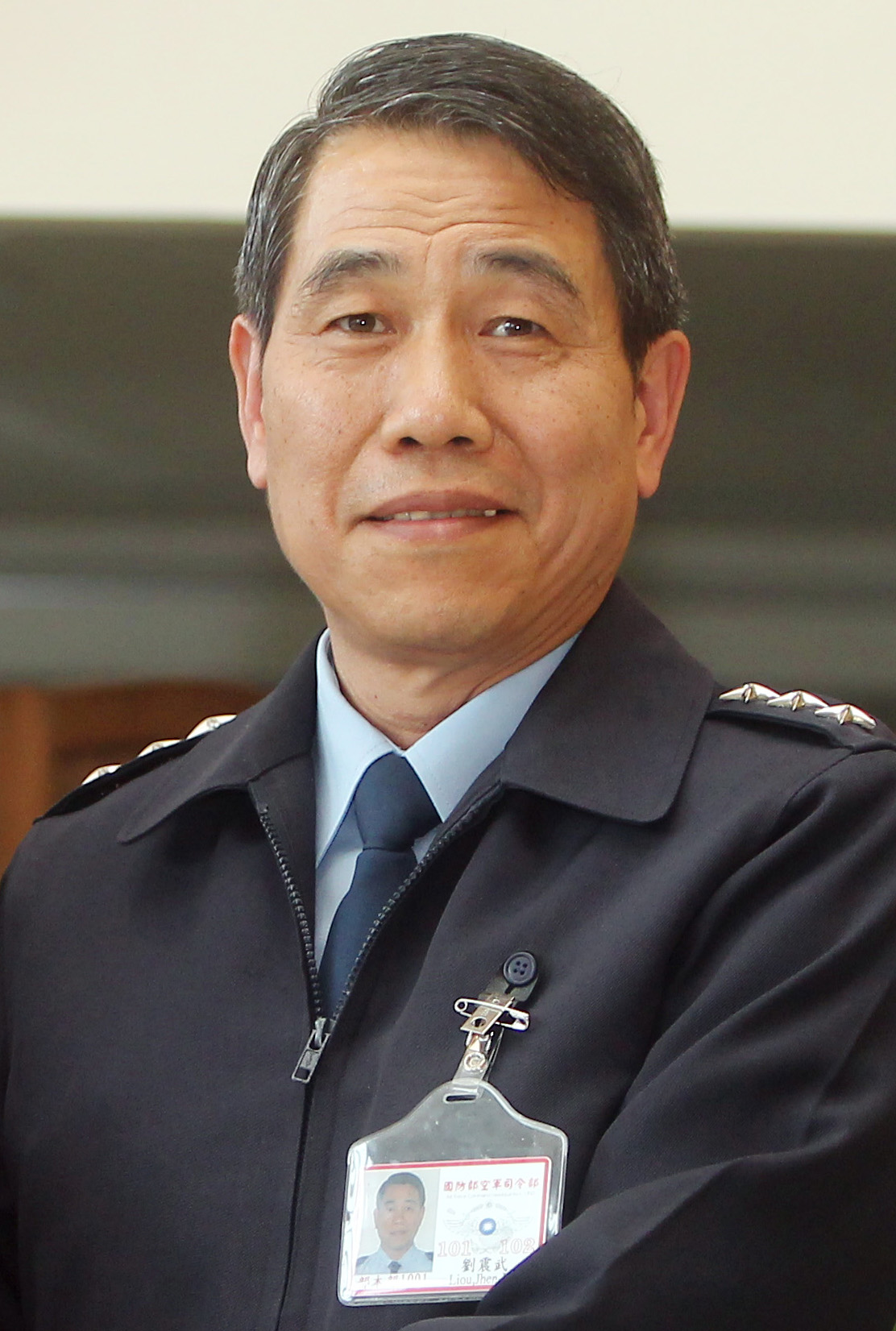

10th Vice Minister (Armaments) of National Defense of the Republic of China
- In office 30 January 2015 – 31 October 2015
- Minister: Kao Kuang-chi
- Preceded by: Chiu Kuo-cheng
- Succeeded by: Cheng Te-mei

5th Commander of the Republic of China Air Force
- In office 16 January 2013 – 29 January 2015
- Preceded by: Yen Ming
- Succeeded by: Shen Yi-ming

Personal details
- Born: October 1951 (age 75) Taiwan
- Education: Republic of China Air Force Academy (BS); National Defense University (MS, MA)

Military service
- Branch/service: Republic of China Air Force
- Years of service: 1974–2015
- Rank: General
- Battles/wars: Third Taiwan Strait Crisis

Liu Chen-wu (Chinese: 劉震武) is a retired general of the Republic of China (Taiwan). He served as the Commander of the ROC Air Force since 16 January 2013 until he was succeeded by General Shen Yi-ming. He was then appointed as the Deputy Minister of National Defense for Armaments for nine months on duty until General Cheng Te-mei succeeded him. He retired from the Republic of China Air Force on 1 November 2015.
