= Michael Tsai =

Taiwanese politician

Michael Tsai MLY
- 蔡明憲
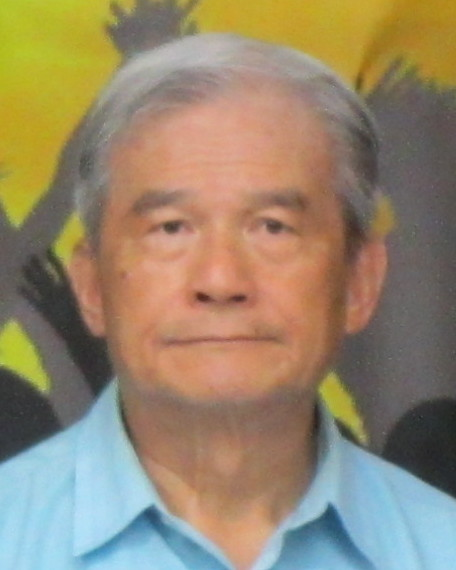
- Tsai in June 2016

26th Minister of National Defense
- In office 25 February 2008 – 19 May 2008
- Preceded by: Lee Tien-yu
- Succeeded by: Chen Chao-min

Vice Minister of National Defense
- In office 9 June 2004 – 25 February 2008
- Minister: Lee Jye; Lee Tien-yu

Deputy ROC Representative to the United States
- In office April 2002 – 9 June 2004 Serving with Shen Lyu-shun
- Representative: Chen Chien-jen
- Preceded by: Lee Ying-yuan
- Succeeded by: Stanley Kao

Member of the Legislative Yuan
- In office 1 February 1996 – 31 January 2002
- Constituency: Taichung

Member of the National Assembly
- In office 1 February 1992 – 31 January 1996

Personal details
- Born: 9 August 1941 (age 84) Taichū Prefecture, Taiwan, Empire of Japan
- Party: Independent
- Other political affiliations: Democratic Progressive Party (until 2019)
- Education: National Taiwan University (LLB); University of Wisconsin—Madison (MBA); California Western School of Law (JD)

Tsai Ming-shian (Chinese: 蔡明憲; pinyin: Cài Míngxiàn; born 9 August 1941), also known by his English name Michael Tsai, is a Taiwanese politician and lawyer.

== Education ==
Tsai attended law school at National Taiwan University and graduated with a Bachelor of Laws (LL.B.) degree. He then completed graduate studies in the United States, earning a Master of Business Administration (M.B.A.) from the University of Wisconsin–Madison and a Juris Doctor (J.D.) from the California Western School of Law.

== Early career ==
For three years, Tsai was a research fellow at the Center for Human Resources Development at San Diego State University. He also practiced law in California, New York, and New Jersey before returning to Taiwan, where he taught law at National Taichung Institute of Technology and National Air University from 1991 to 2002.

== Political career ==
Tsai returned to Taiwan in 1990, despite being placed on a blacklist compiled by the Kuomintang. He later joined the Democratic Progressive Party.

Tsai was a member of the National Assembly from 1992 to 1996, then was elected to the Legislative Yuan twice in 1995 and 1998. While serving as a legislator, Tsai helped run Edgar Lin's 1993 campaign for the Taichung mayoralty, Chen Ding-nan's 1994 campaign for Taiwan provincial governor, and the legislative campaigns of Hung Chi-chang. Tsai sought the Taichung mayoralty in 2001, and lost the election to Jason Hu. In April 2002, he was named deputy representative to the United States. On 9 June 2004, Tsai was sworn in as vice defense minister. He was named the Democratic Progressive Party candidate for Taichung 1 in 2008, and lost to Tsai Chin-lung in the January legislative elections. Following the electoral defeat, Michael Tsai was promoted to Minister of National Defense in February 2008, after the resignation of Lee Tien-yu.

While an active politician, Tsai wrote occasionally for the Taipei Times. After leaving politics, Tsai continued to advocate for stronger Taiwan–United States relations and has led the Taiwan United Nations Alliance. He has proposed that Taiwan raise military spending. After the Democratic Progressive Party chose to delay its 2020 presidential primary, Tsai denounced factionalism within the party and renounced his party membership in April 2019.

== Controversy ==
In November 2007, while Tsai was vice defense minister, Aerospace Industrial Development Corporation won a bid to produce equipment for the Republic of China Armed Forces. Kuomintang legislator Tsai Chin-lung had reviewed military equipment, found the specifications to violate the contract terms, and ordered AIDC to suspend production. Michael Tsai and DPP lawmakers Ho Min-hao and Hsieh Ming-yuan along with AIDC chairman Lo Cheng-fang, accused Tsai Chin-lung of interference on behalf of SYM, the company that had lost the contract. The Taipei District Court ruled in September 2011 that the claims against Tsai Chin-lung were unsubstantiated and ordered all four accusers to publish a public apology.

In April 2009, Next Magazine reported that Tsai was responsible for selling military ranks during his tenure as Minister of National Defense. Tsai denied the allegations and sued the publishers for defamation. Tsai released his memoirs, God Bless Taiwan in April 2011. Shortly before its official publication in 2013, Tsai was accused of leaking state secrets.

In August 2014, Tsai and Chiou I-jen were accused of violating the Classified National Security Information Protection Act. The Supreme Court found both not guilty in November 2015.
