= Indonesia–Taiwan relations =

- Indonesia: Taiwan

Diplomatic mission
- Indonesian Economic and Trade Office to Taipei: Taipei Economic and Trade Office, Jakarta, Indonesia

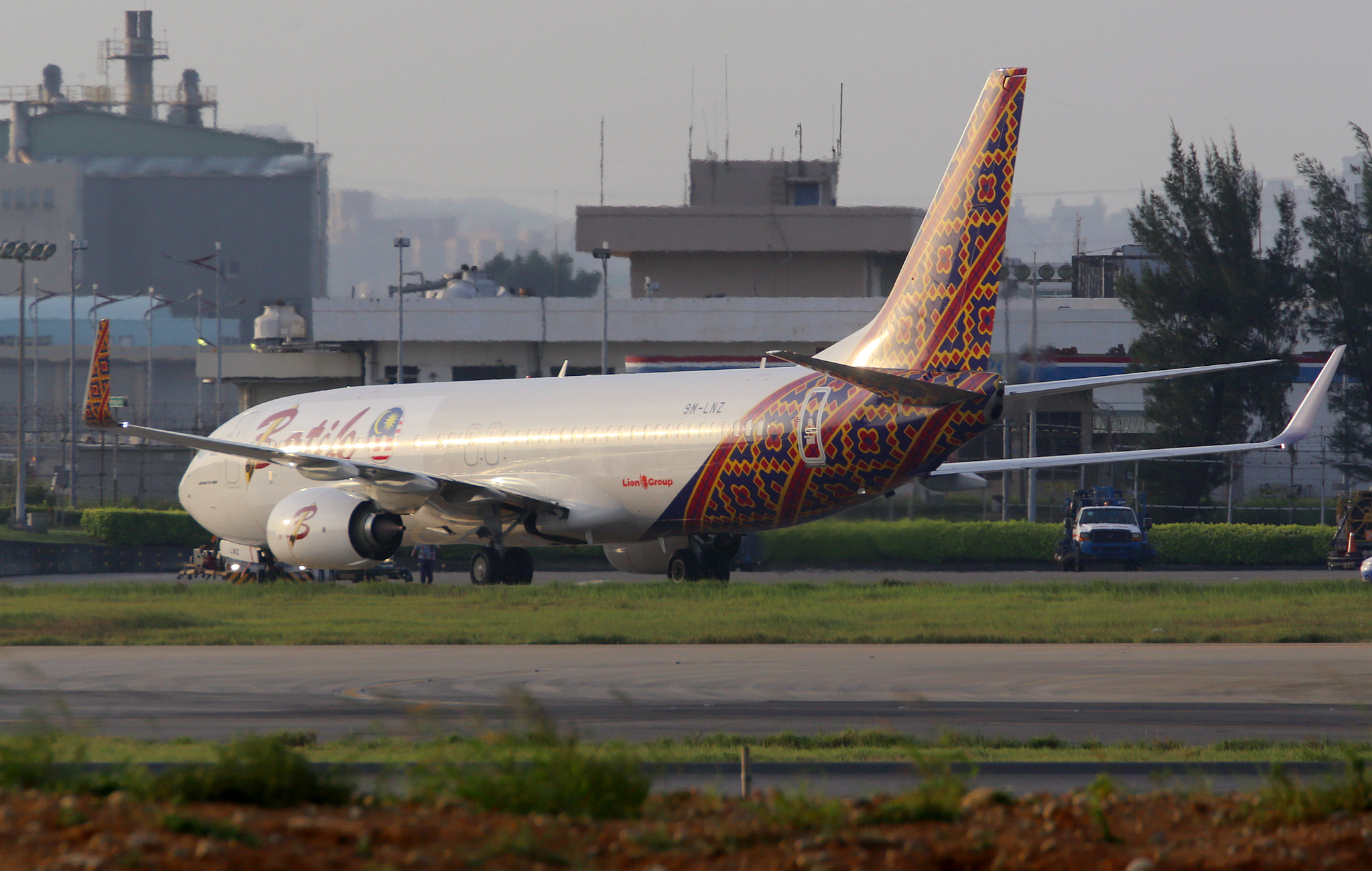
Batik Air aircraft in Taiwan

Indonesia–Taiwan relations are foreign relations between Indonesia and Taiwan. Currently, Indonesia does not officially recognize the Republic of China (Taiwan) as it adopted the One-China Policy; officially recognizing the People’s Republic of China only since 1950. Despite geopolitical constraints, the relationship between the two countries remain flourished over time, with growing opportunities for widening and deepening ties.

== History ==
Ethnically and linguistically indigenous peoples of Taiwan and native Indonesians are related, as both are of Austronesian ancestry. The "out of Taiwan theory" suggests that the Austronesian-speaking people — the ancestors of Indonesians — came from Taiwan during the "Austronesian Expansion" which began 4,000–5,000 years ago. Nevertheless, the question of origin and ancestry of present-day Austronesian-speaking populations remains controversial.

Prior to the Independence of Indonesia, during Dutch East Indies era in early 20th century, the Republic of China has reached out to people of the Indies, especially towards Overseas Chinese. Back in 1900, the socio-religious organization Tiong Hoa Hwe Koan (中華 會館), also known as the Chinese Association, was founded in the East Indies. Their goal was to urge ethnic Chinese in the Indies to support the revolutionary movement in mainland China. The 1912 founding of the Republic of China coincided with a growing Chinese-nationalist movement within the Indies. At that time, many Chinese Indonesians had dual citizenship and remained loyal to the Republic of China.

After Indonesia proclaimed its independence in 1945 and won recognition in 1949, Indonesia briefly recognized the Republic of China between 1949 and 1950. However, after the defeat of the Republic of China Armed Forces to the People's Liberation Army and its retreat to Taiwan, a former Japanese colony, Indonesia shifted its official recognition to People's Republic of China and opted for the One-China policy.

In 1955, Indonesia and the PRC agreed to Sino-Indonesian Dual Nationality Treaty, which required Chinese dual citizens to choose between Indonesian nationality and PRC nationality. If a Chinese did not elect between their former dual nationalities, the treaty deemed them to have repudiated their Indonesian nationality. This situation was complicated by the fact that many Chinese Indonesians held ROC passports and viewed themselves as ROC nationals. The ROC protested and in 1958 evacuated more than five thousand overseas Chinese to Taiwan. According to some estimates, by 1962 there were approximately 1 million ethnic Chinese in Indonesia without nationality.

During the Indonesian mass killings of 1965–66, the Indonesian army and Chinese-hating guerillas massacred thousands of ethnic Chinese, contending that the Chinese were communists or loyal to the PRC. The relationship between Indonesia and the PRC worsened as the two nations severed diplomatic relations. However Indonesia did not re-establish diplomatic relations with Republic of China, despite sharing anti-communist sentiments at that time. Nevertheless, Indonesia and Taiwan enjoy close relations since the late 1960s.

Indonesia has established an Indonesian Economic and Trade Office in Taipei since 1970, while Taiwan reciprocated by establishing the Taipei Economic and Trade Office (TETO) in Jakarta since 1971. In October 2015, the Ministry of Foreign Affairs announced the planned opening of the second TETO in Surabaya, East Java. The office was officially opened on 18 December 2015 and started its operation on 21 December 2015.

== Economic relations ==
Indonesia is Taiwan's 10th-largest trade partner, with annual two-way trade volume reaching US$12.3 billion. For Indonesia, Taiwan is their 9th-largest foreign direct investment source, with total investments amounting to US$15.3 billion, generating about 1 million job opportunities, while there are around 8,000 Taiwanese managerial and technical personnel working in Indonesia. According to the Investment Coordinating Board, 1,475 Taiwanese investors had invested in Indonesia up to June 2012.

On 12 May 2016, both sides signed an agricultural cooperation agreement in Taipei, which includes agrifood, horticulture, dairy farming and slope crops for areas of cooperation and investment.

== Education ==
Currently, there are around 4,500 Indonesian students studying in Taiwan.

Citizens of the Republic of China (Taiwan) residing in Indonesia are served by two international schools:

- Jakarta Taipei School (雅加達臺灣學校)
- Surabaya Taipei International School (印尼泗水臺灣學校)

== Tourism ==
Taiwan is the 8th-largest source of visitors to Indonesia. In 2012, 216,535 Taiwanese tourists visited Indonesia. With 88 flights per week between the two countries, the popular tourist destinations for Taiwanese visitors are Bali, Borobudur, and Jakarta.

== Sports ==
The Taiwan External Trade Development Council has been organizing the Taiwan Excellence Happy Run in Jakarta since 2014.

== Migrant workers ==
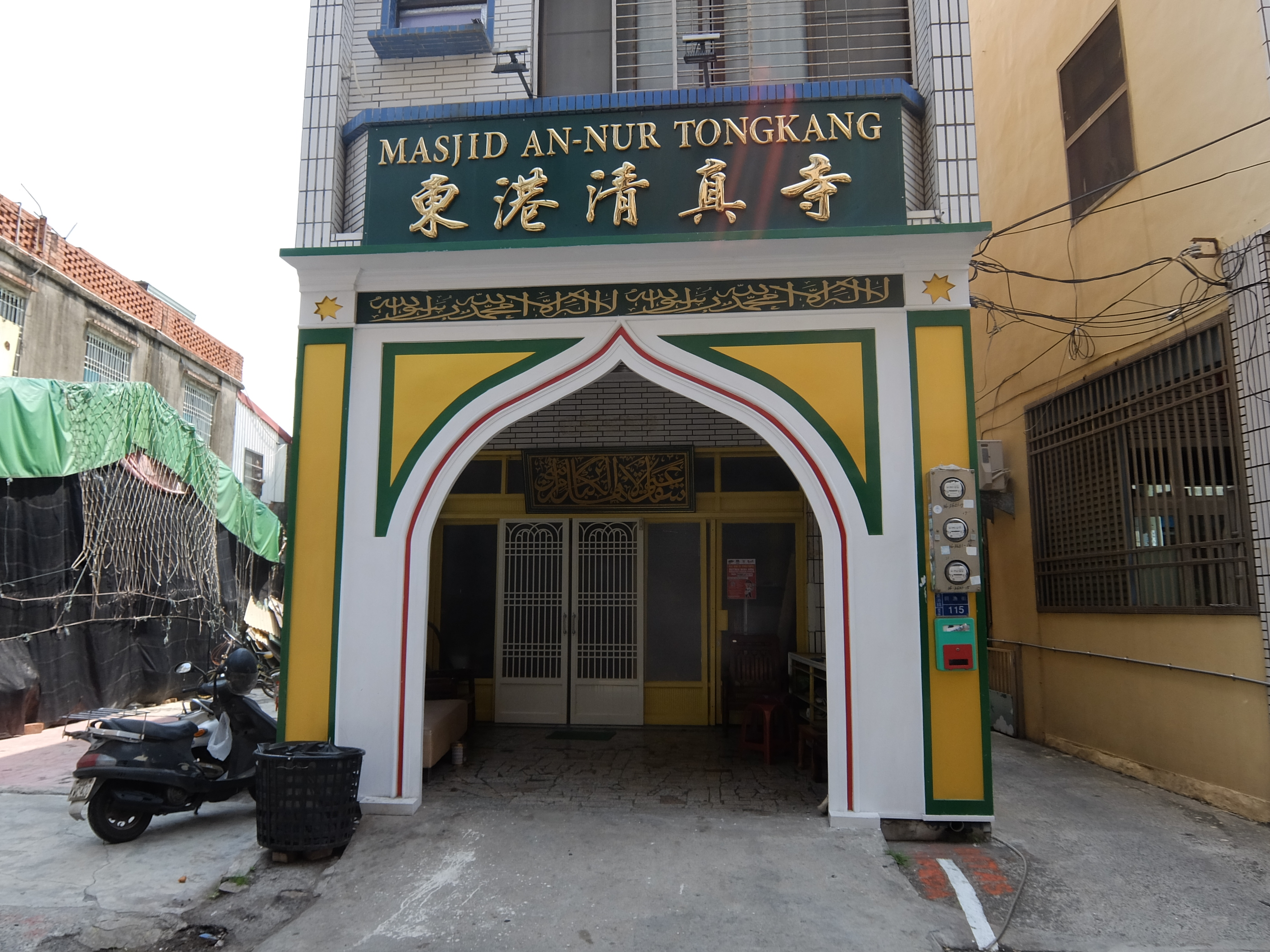
An-Nur Tongkang Mosque in Donggang Township, Pingtung County, Taiwan built by Indonesian migrant fishermen.

Indonesia is Taiwan's largest source of foreign migrant workers. In 2012, there were around 185,000 Indonesian migrant workers in Taiwan, equal to 42 percent of the total foreign workforce in Taiwan. The number has continually risen since January 2011, when the Agreements on the Placement of Indonesian Manpower in Taiwan was signed. In 2014, the figure raised to 190,000 Indonesian laborers out of total 450,000 foreign workers in Taiwan. According to Taipei Times, Indonesian President Joko Widodo at the time praised Taiwan for its friendly treatment of Indonesian workers.

== See also ==
- Indonesians in Taiwan
- Chinese Indonesians
