= Indonesian Economic and Trade Office to Taipei =

Representative office of Indonesia in the Republic of China

Indonesian Economic and Trade Office to Taipei Kantor Dagang dan Ekonomi Indonesia di Taipei
- 駐台北印尼經濟貿易代表處

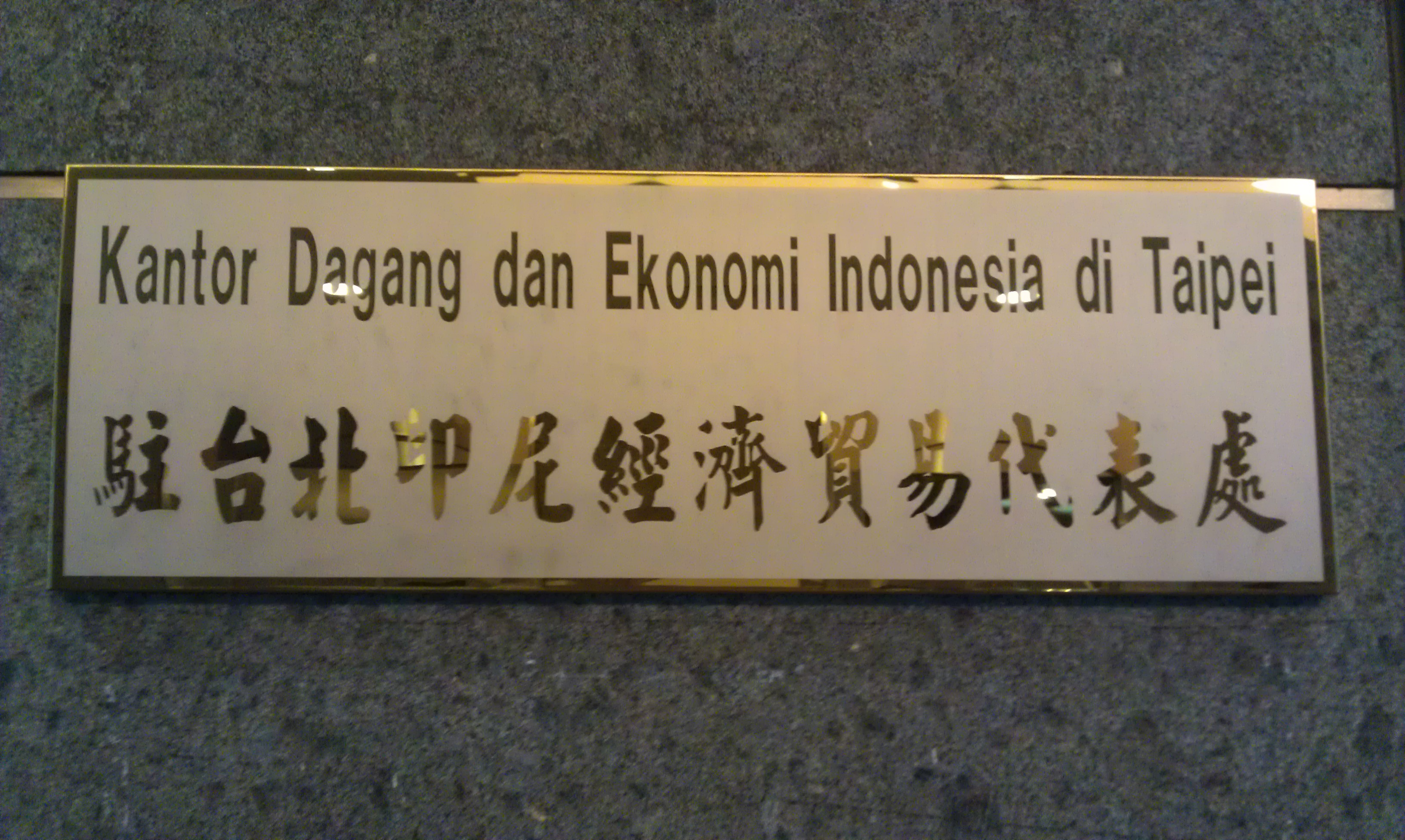

Agency overview
- Formed: 1970 (as Indonesian Chamber of Commerce in Taipei); 1995 (as Indonesian Economic and Trade Office to Taipei)
- Jurisdiction: Taiwan
- Headquarters: No. 550, Rui Guang Road, Neihu District, Taipei, Taiwan
- Agency executive: Arif Sulistyo, Representative
- Website: KDEI Taipei - Kantor Dagang dan Ekonomi Indonesia

The Indonesian Economic and Trade Office to Taipei (Indonesian: Kantor Dagang dan Ekonomi Indonesia di Taipei, KDEI, Chinese: 駐台北印尼經濟貿易代表處; pinyin: Zhù Táiběi Yìnní Jīngjì Màoyì Dàibiǎo Chù) is the de facto embassy of Indonesia in Taiwan. Indonesia's official diplomatic relations with the People's Republic of China (PRC) were established in 1950 had the acknowledgment of the "one-China policy" leading to the opening of the representative office in 1970 as an office of Indonesian Chamber of Commerce and Industry (KADIN) in the absence of diplomatic relations. It adopted its present name in 1995.

Its counterpart body in Indonesia is the Taipei Economic and Trade Office in Jakarta.

== History ==
Before being established as Chamber of Commerce, the representation office was an overseas station of National Intelligence Coordinating Board (predecessor of Indonesian State Intelligence Agency) which established in 1967 known as Kantor Taipei (Taipei Office). In 1970, the representation office developed into Kamar Dagang Indonesia di Taipei (Indonesian Chamber of Commerce in Taipei) jointly staffed by National Intelligence Coordinating Board, Indonesian Chamber of Commerce and Industry, and Directorate General of Immigration. In 1990s, its economical function expanded, thus additional staffs from the Investment Coordinating Board and Department of Trade recruited to man the office.

Until 1994, despite being a trade office, this office was placed under the National Intelligence Coordinating Board supervision. Since 7 July 1994, the office moved under the Department of Trade (now Ministry of Trade) supervision thru Presidential Decree No. 48/1994 until the present day and renamed to its current name.

== See also ==
- Taipei Economic and Trade Office, Jakarta, Indonesia
- Indonesia–Taiwan relations
- List of diplomatic missions of Indonesia
- List of diplomatic missions in Taiwan
