= Cheng Te-mei =

Officer of the Republic of China Army in Taiwan

- 鄭德美
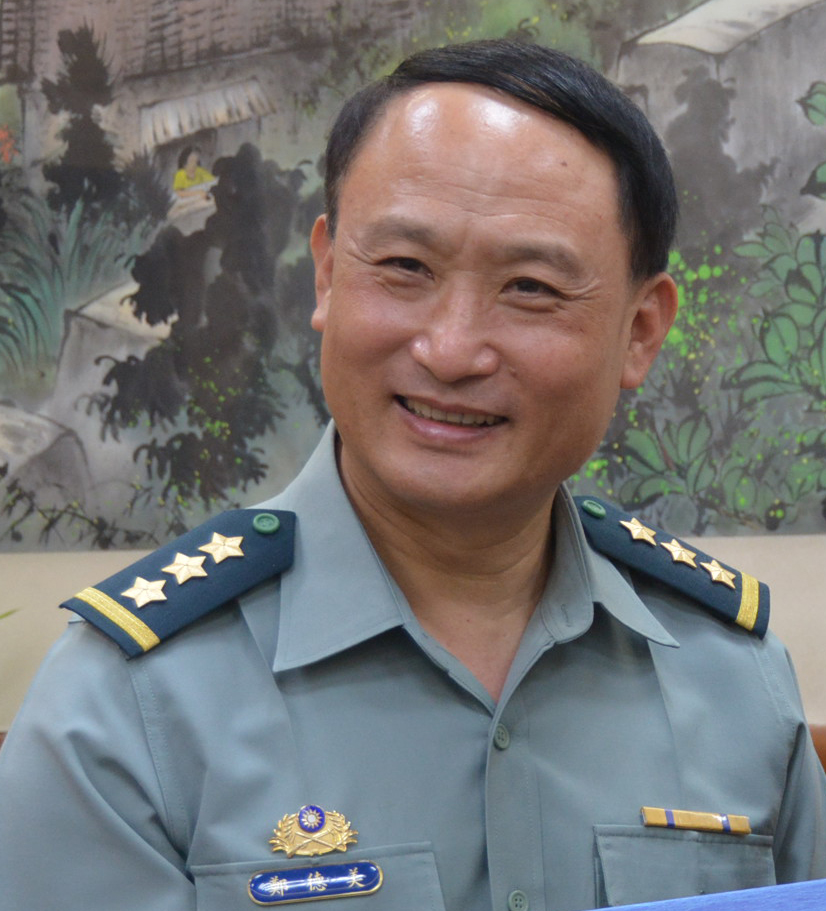

Vice Minister (Armaments), Ministry of National Defense of the Republic of China
- In office 1 November 2015 – 28 April 2017
- Preceded by: Liu Chen-wu
- Succeeded by: Chang Guan-chung

Personal details
- Born: 20 November 1955 (age 70) Taiwan
- Education: National Defense University (BS, MS)

Military service
- Branch/service: Republic of China Army (ROCA)
- Years of service: 1978-
- Rank: General

Cheng Te-mei (traditional Chinese: 鄭德美; simplified Chinese: 郑德美; pinyin: Zhèng Déměi) is a general officer of the Republic of China Army (ROCA) in Taiwan. Born in Taiwan with Hainanese parents. He was the Vice Minister (Armaments) of National Defense, having served in this capacity from 1 November 2015 to 28 April 2017.
