= Hu Chen-pu =

Taiwanese politician

- 胡鎮埔

11th Minister of the Veterans Affairs Commission of the Republic of China
- In office 9 February 2007 – 20 May 2008
- Preceded by: Kao Hua-chu
- Succeeded by: Kao Hua-chu

1st Commander of the Republic of China Army
- In office 16 February 2006 – 31 January 2007
- President: Chen Shui-bian
- Preceded by: Chu Kai-sheng (as Commander-in-Chief of the Republic of China Army)
- Succeeded by: Chao Shih-chang

Personal details
- Born: 14 August 1948 (age 77) Hupeh, China
- Party: Kuomintang (1967–2011); Independent (2011–present)

Military service
- Branch/service: Republic of China Army
- Years of service: 1971－2007
- Rank: General
- Battles/wars: Third Taiwan Strait Crisis

Hu Chen-pu (Chinese: 胡鎮埔; pinyin: Hú Zhènbù; born 14 August 1948) is a Taiwanese politician and retired general officer. He was the 1st Commander of the Republic of China Army, 11th Minister of the Veterans Affairs Commission (VAC) of the Executive Yuan and 1st Commander of the Republic of China Army (ROCA).

== Verdict ==
On 30 September 2011, Hu was found guilty of corruption by the Taipei District Court. He was sentenced for ten years in prison and his civil rights was deprived for three years. He secured a total of NT$1.4 million from RPTL International and other companies in which the VAC had invested.
