= Taipei Economic and Trade Office, Jakarta =

Political representative office in Kebayoran Baru, Jakarta, Indonesia

Coordinates: 6°13′29″N 106°48′39″E

Taipei Economic and Trade Office, Jakarta, Indonesia 駐印尼台北經濟貿易代表處
- Kantor Dagang dan Ekonomi Taipei, Jakarta, Indonesia
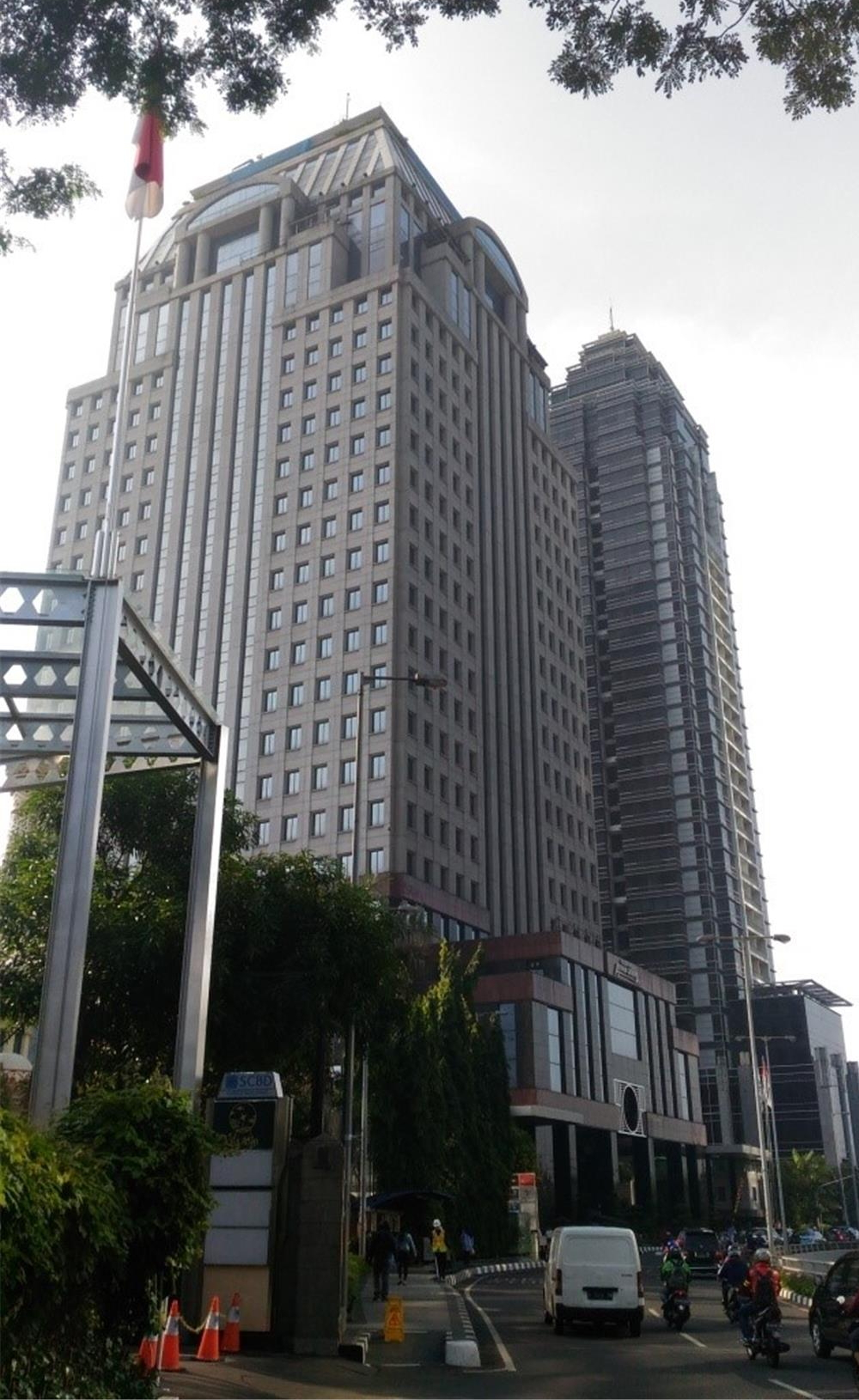

Agency overview
- Formed: 1971 (as Chinese Chamber of Commerce to Jakarta); 1989 (as Taipei Economic and Trade Office)
- Jurisdiction: Indonesia; East Timor
- Headquarters: Senayan, Kebayoran Baru, Jakarta, Indonesia
- Agency executive: Bruce Chen-jung Hung, Representative
- Website: Official website

The Taipei Economic and Trade Office, Jakarta, Indonesia (TETO; Chinese: 駐印尼台北經濟貿易代表處; pinyin: Zhù Yìnní Táiběi Jīngjì Màoyì Dàibiǎo; Indonesian: Kantor Dagang dan Ekonomi Taipei) is the representative office of the Republic of China (Taiwan) in Indonesia, functioning as a de facto embassy in the absence of diplomatic relations. It also has responsibility for East Timor.

The office is located at Artha Graha Building in Sudirman CBD, Senayan, Kebayoran Baru, Jakarta. There is also an office in Surabaya which opened on 18 December 2015.

Its counterpart body in Taiwan is the Indonesian Economic and Trade Office to Taipei.

== History ==
TETO was originally established in April 1971 as the Chinese Chamber of Commerce to Jakarta, before adopting its present name in 1989.

== Organizational structure ==
- Public Affairs Division
- Economic Division
- Information Division
- Overseas Compatriot Division
- Service Division

== Representatives ==
- David Lin (2003 – 2007)
- Timothy Yang (August 2007 – 10 September 2009)
- Andrew Hsia (December 2009 – 22 October 2013)
- Chang Liang-jen (22 January 2014 - December 2016)
- John C. Chen (December 2016 - November 2024)
- Bruce Chen-jung Hung (November 2024 –)

== See also ==
- Taipei Economic and Cultural Representative Office
- List of diplomatic missions of Taiwan
