= Kao Hua-chu =

- 高華柱
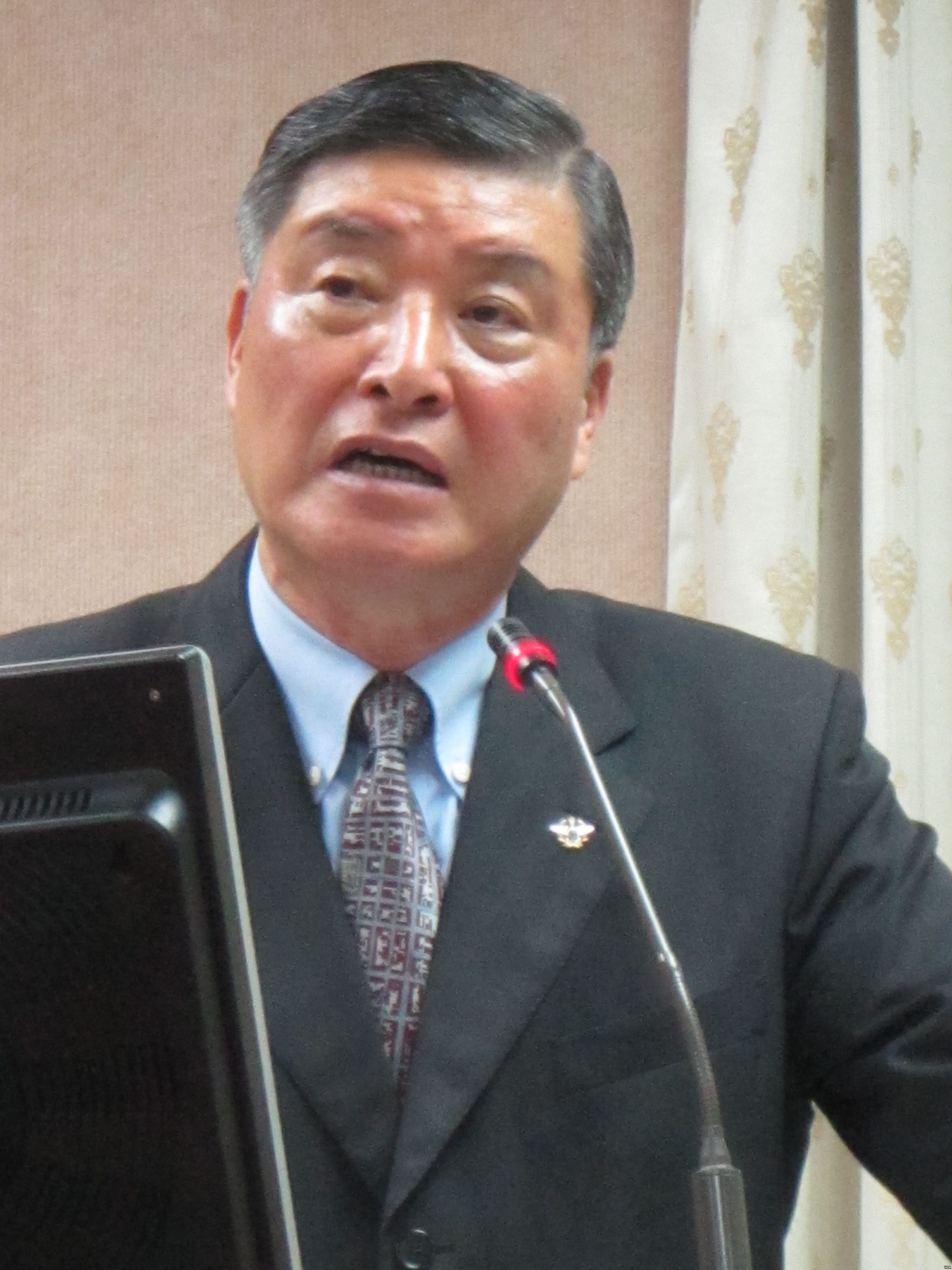

18th Secretary-General of the National Security Council of the Republic of China
- In office 12 February 2015 – 20 May 2016
- President: Ma Ying-jeou
- Preceded by: King Pu-tsung
- Succeeded by: Joseph Wu

28th Minister of National Defense of the Republic of China
- In office 9 September 2009 – 31 July 2013
- Deputy: Chang Liang-jen, Chao Shih-chang; Andrew Yang, Chao Shih-chang; Andrew Yang, Kao Kuang-chi
- Preceded by: Chen Chao-min
- Succeeded by: Andrew Yang

10th & 12th Minister of the Veterans Affairs Commission of the Republic of China
- In office 20 May 2008 – 10 September 2009
- Preceded by: Hu Chen-pu
- Succeeded by: Tseng Jing-ling
- In office 20 May 2004 – 9 February 2007
- Preceded by: Teng Tsu-lin
- Succeeded by: Hu Chen-pu

2nd Commander of the Republic of China Combined Logistics Forces
- In office 1 February 2003 – 19 May 2004
- Preceded by: Hsieh Chien-tung
- Succeeded by: Tai Po-teh

Personal details
- Born: 2 October 1946 (age 80) Jimo, Shandong, Republic of China
- Party: Kuomintang
- Education: Republic of China Military Academy (BS); National Defense University (MA); George Washington University (MS)

Military service
- Allegiance: Republic of China
- Branch/service: Republic of China Army
- Years of service: 1967-2004
- Rank: General
- Battles/wars: Third Taiwan Strait Crisis

Kao Hua-chu (traditional Chinese: 高華柱; simplified Chinese: 高华柱; pinyin: Gāo Huázhù; born 2 October 1946) is a retired Republic of China Army general and the former Secretary-General of the National Security Council of the Republic of China from 2015 to 2016. He was the Minister of National Defense that appointed to the post by then Premier-designate Wu Den-yih on 9 September 2009. On 29 July 2013, Kao resigned from his post due to the death scandal of Corporal Hung Chung-chiu of the Republic of China Army during his conscription on 4 July 2013.

== Early life and education ==
After graduating from National Nantou Senior High School, Kao graduated from the Republic of China Military Academy in 1959 and was commissioned as an officer in the Republic of China Armed Forces. He then graduated from National Defense University in 1971 with a degree in war studies and earned a master's degree in engineering management from George Washington University in the United States.

=== 1974 Army helicopter crash ===
In 1974, Kao was involved in a helicopter crash in Taoyuan County (now Taoyuan City) with his colleagues, including Yu Hao-chang, the then-Commanding General of Army Command Headquarters. The accident involved two UH-1H helicopters that crashed due to bad weather. It killed more than 20 people and seriously injured Kao, yet he still managed to carry Yu on his back while looking for help.

== 2009 Typhoon Morakot ==
A month after Typhoon Morakot brought the worst flooding and mudslides to Taiwan in 50 years, Kao was appointed as the leading deputy executive officer of the Morakot Post-Disaster Reconstruction Council of the Executive Yuan.

== ROC Minister of National Defense ==
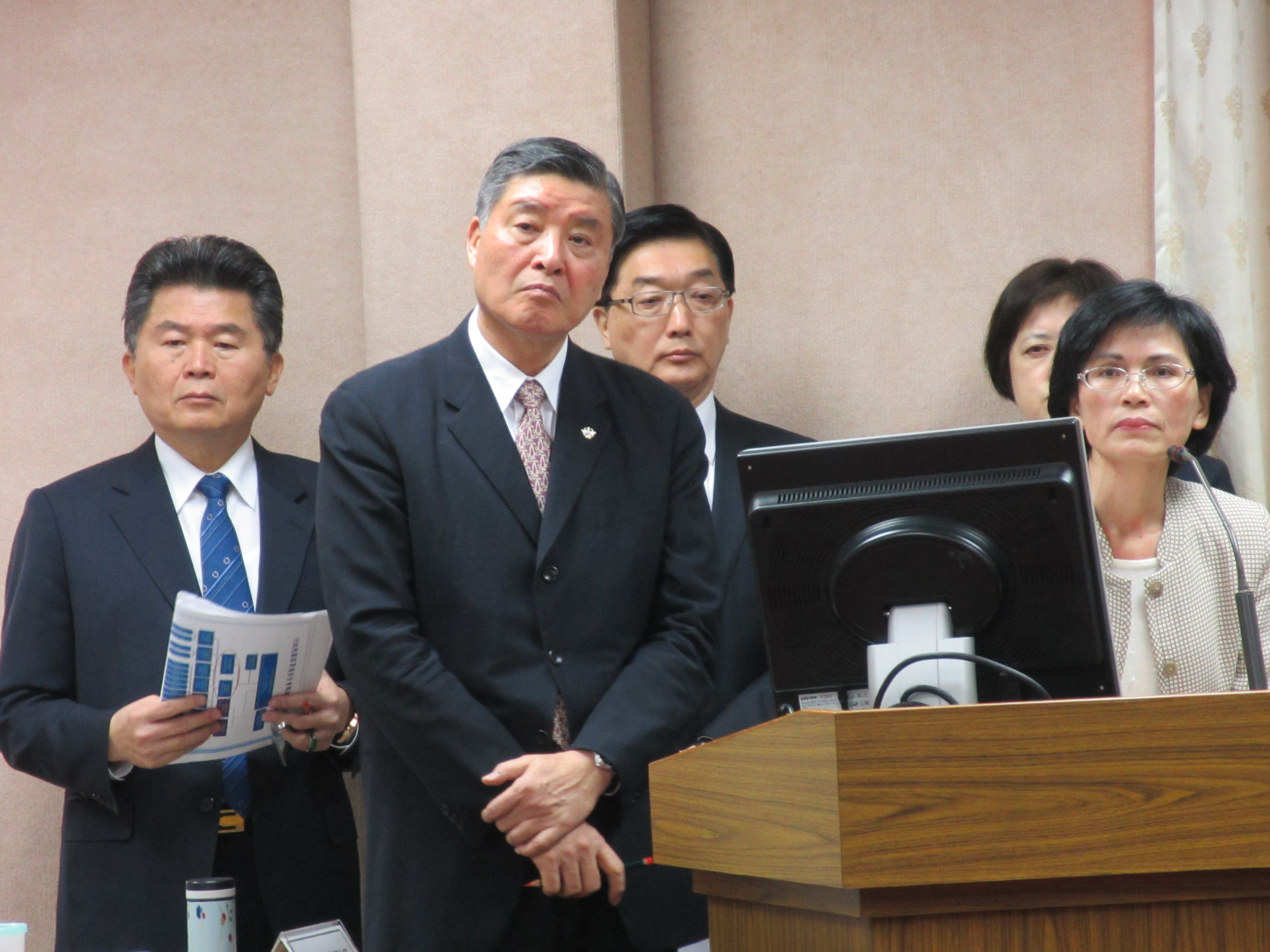
Kao in Legislative Yuan

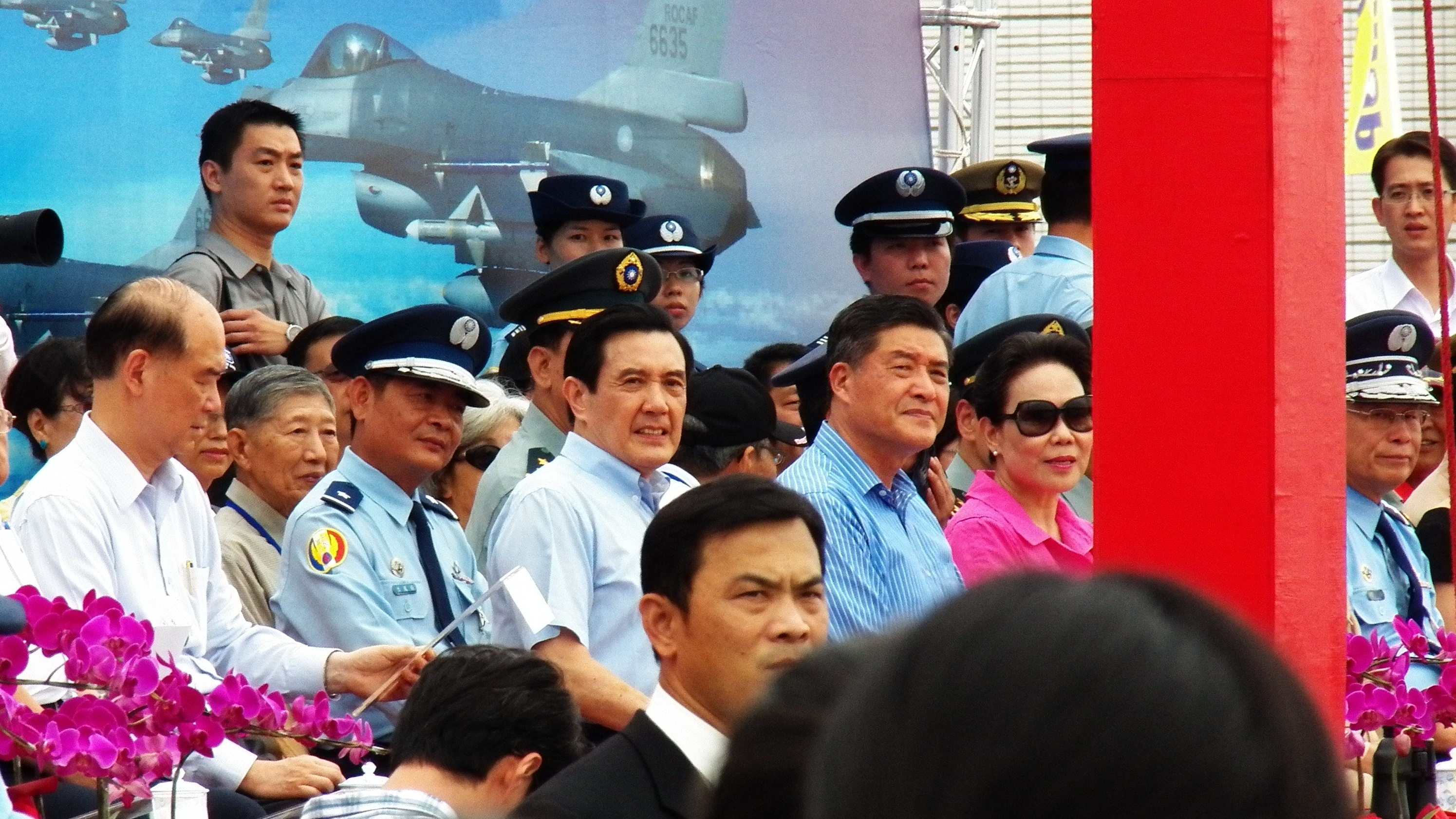
Kao and President Ma at Chiayi Air Base

=== 2013 Korean crisis ===
Amidst the ongoing 2013 North Korean crisis, in mid April 2013 Kao said that the ROC Armed Forces is capable of intercepting missiles from North Korea and it doesn't pose any threat to Taiwan because the chance for Taiwan to be accidentally hit by the missiles is low. He further added that long-range radar installation in Hsinchu County could always detect any incoming missiles fired by North Korea before.

=== Dadan Island and Erdan Island demilitarization ===
Kao said that once ROC two outlying islands Dadan Island and Erdan Island have been demilitarized and are open to public within three years, he hoped that the Coast Guard Administration and other law enforcement agencies can take over the security for both islands. Currently those two islands are off to public due to its extremely close proximity (7 nautical miles) to PRC area, the coast of Xiamen.

=== Taiwanese fisherman shooting incident ===
After the shooting incident of Taiwanese fisherman by Philippine government vessel on 9 May 2013 at the disputed water in South China Sea, on May 11, 2013, Kao held a meeting with ROC President Ma Ying-jeou and ROC Minister of Foreign Affairs David Lin at the Presidential Office Building in Taipei in which the ROC government gave 72 hours for the Philippine government to give formal apology and bring those responsible for the shooting to justice, if not Taiwan will freeze Philippine worker applications, recall ROC representative to the Philippines back to Taiwan and ask the Philippine representative in Taiwan back to the Philippines.

=== Two ROC Air Force fighter aircraft crash ===
After the two incident involving two of ROC Air Force fighter aircraft in mid of May 2013 within five days apart involving an F-16 and Mirage 2000-5, Kao apologized to the public but asking their support for the moral of the pilots involved in the incident. He assured the public that all remaining aircraft in duty are all in good condition, and that the two crashes didn't compromise Taiwan's air defense.

== ROC NSC Secretary-General ==
=== 2015 Ma-Xi Meeting ===
The ROC Presidential Office stated that the intention of President Ma for this meeting is to consolidate peace and maintain the status quo. President Ma will be joined by Presidential Office Secretary-General Tseng Yung-chuan and Deputy Secretary-General Hsiao Hsu-tsen (蕭旭岑), National Security Council Secretary-General Kao Hua-chu and advisor Chiu Kun-Shuan, MAC Minister Andrew Hsia and Deputy Minister Wu Mei-hung.

== See also ==
- Republic of China Armed Forces
- Veterans Affairs Commission
