= Jakarta Taipei School =

Taiwanese international school in Indonesia

- 雅加達臺灣學校

Location
- Jl. Raya Kelapa Hybrida Blok QH Kelapa Gading Permai JAKARTA - INDONESIA; Indonesia
- Coordinates: 6.146298400000001°S 106.90592960000004°E

Information
- Type: Taiwanese international school
- Established: 1991
- Website: jtsid.org

Jakarta Taipei School
- Traditional Chinese: 雅加達臺灣學校
- Simplified Chinese: 雅加达台湾学校
Transcriptions
Standard Mandarin
- Hanyu Pinyin: Yǎjiādá Táiwān Xuéxiào
- Wade–Giles: Ya-chia-ta T'ai-wan Hsüeh-hsiao

Jakarta Taipei School (JTS; Chinese: 雅加達臺灣學校), formerly Jakarta Taipei International School (JTIS) in English, is an international school maintained by the Taiwan-based Republic of China government in Jakarta, Indonesia. The school takes Taiwanese (ROC) citizens and students of other nationalities, offering kindergarten through senior high school classes taught with the Taiwanese curriculum.

As of 2016, the school had 30 teachers, 180 Taiwanese students, and 100 students of other citizenships.

== History ==
The school opened in 1991 with the Taipei Economic and Trade Office in Jakarta assisting. It was first established on 10 January 1992, making it the first Chinese-language school in Indonesia since the Indonesian government ended its ban on the Chinese language.

== See also ==
- Chinese Indonesians
- Indonesia–Taiwan relations
