= Java transaction service =

Java enterprise service

The Java Transaction Service (JTS) is a Java facility implementing an Object Management Group (OMG) object transaction service, enabling managers to coordinate across systems. It uses the General Inter-ORB Protocol (IIOP) over CORBA to propagate transaction information via the Java Transaction API.
