= Wang Shin-lung =

- 王信龍
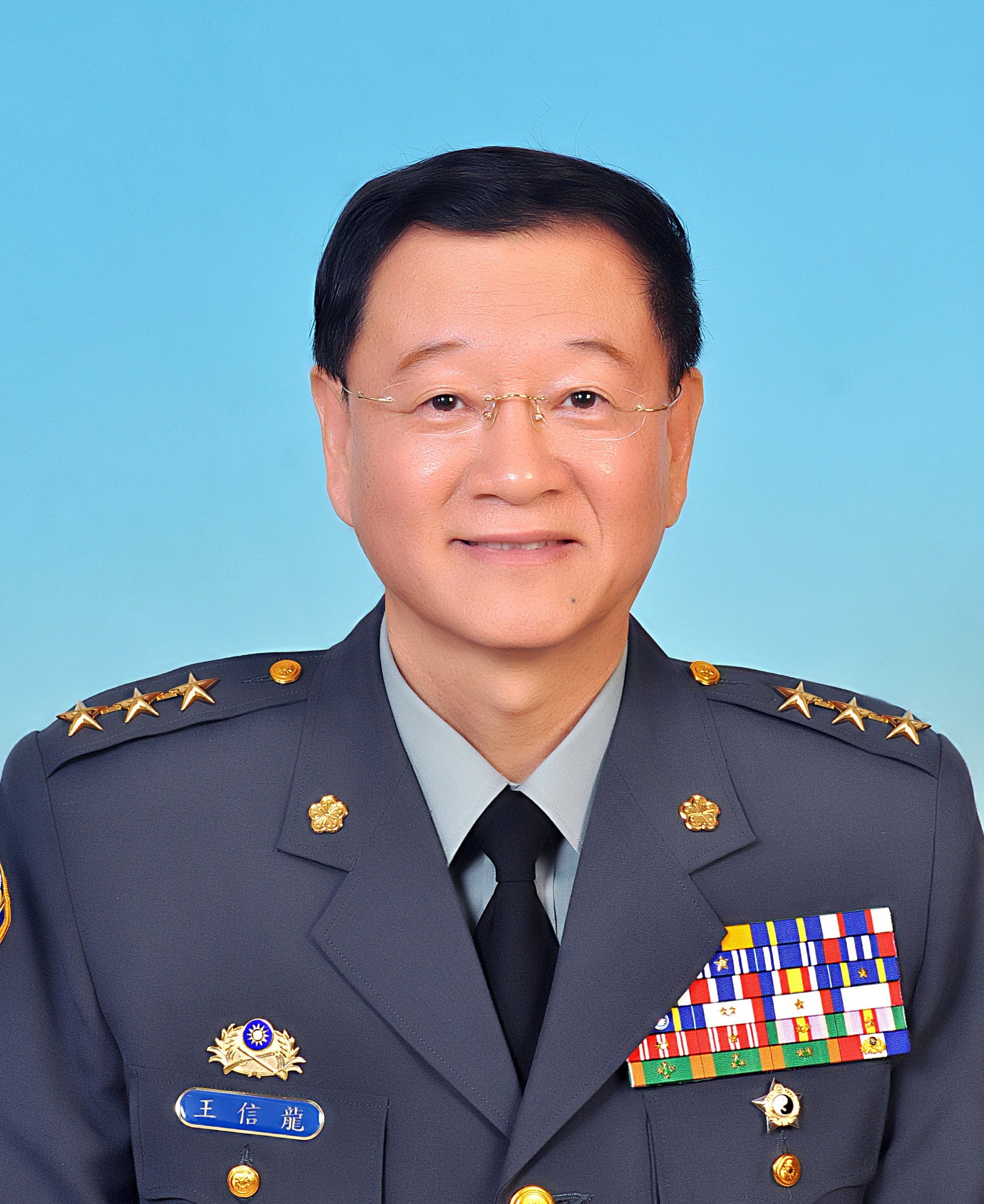

Strategic Advisor to the Presidential Office of the Republic of China
- Incumbent
- Assumed office 1 May 2023
- President: Tsai Ing-wen

Vice Minister (Armaments), Ministry of National Defense of the Republic of China
- In office 1 July 2021 – 30 April 2023
- Preceded by: Chang Guan-chung
- Succeeded by: Hsu Yen-pu

7th Commander of the Republic of China Army
- In office 1 December 2016 – 31 March 2019
- Preceded by: Chiu Kuo-cheng
- Succeeded by: Chen Pao-yu

Personal details
- Born: 1960 (age 65–66) Xincheng, Hualien

Wang Shin-lung (Chinese: 王信龍; pinyin: Wáng Xìnlóng) is a general officer of the Republic of China (ROC) in Taiwan. Born in Xincheng, Hualien, ancestry from Dinghai, Zhejiang. He served as the Commanding General of the Republic of China Army from 1 December 2016 to 31 March 2019, and was the Vice Minister (Armaments) of the Ministry of National Defense from 1 July 2021 to 30 April 2023. Since 1 May 2023, Wang has served as a strategic advisor to the Office of the President of the Republic of China.

== Life ==
Wang Shin-lung was born in a rural area of Hualien County, Taiwan. His father Wang, Ing-far was a veteran, who after retirement, settled in Hualien. To support the family, he had been working temporarily in the brick-making factories and wineries, and later on found a permanent job as a janitor at Xincheng Junior High School. The family was very poor. Wang Shin-lung graduated from Hualien private Joseph (now Haixing) Primary School, then Xincheng Junior High School and finally Hualien Engineering Electronics Polytechnic School. He entered the first generation (G1) of the Army College Specialist Class (1980 classes) and studied in the mechanical engineering and Army infantry department. After graduating from the Army College, he served as an Army officer in different posts around the country for several years, then was admitted to study at Army Infantry School, then the College of the Armed Forces (1992 classes), and the University of War (1998 Classes). Army Headquarters gave high evaluations on Wang Shin-lung's academic performance as "hard-working, laying solid foundation of military academy and accomplishment." For Wang Shin-lung's birth background concerned, when he was promoted as major general, lieutenant general and the general continuously, Hualien County Magistrate Fu, Kun-chi, Speaker Lai, Jin-kun, and Xincheng Township Mayor He, Li-tai recognized and praised him unanimously as the "Glory of Hualien."

Career of the Army College Specialist Classes Wang Shin-lung was admitted to the Department of Mechanical Engineering of the Army College Specialist Classes (G1) on April 28, 1978, and graduated on October 29, 1980. He was awarded a two-year college diploma and appointed as Army lieutenant with a total of 1,058 G1 alumni.

== Military career ==
April 27, 2016 lieutenant general Wang Shin-lung was the vice minister of the Ministry of Defense and major general Li Guofang, the Army Airways 601 Brigade Chief, accompanied members of the Foreign and Defense Committee of the Legislative Yuan Ms Lu Yuling and Mr. Lin Changzo for official inspection.

Wang Shin-lung was promoted to major general in July 2004, his early important career, including Director General of the Manning and Equipping Division, Department of Strategic Planning, Ministry of Defense, 119th Brigade Commander of the Army Infantry, Commander of the Army 34th Division, Commander of the Taitung Regional Command, Deputy Commander of the Army Taitung Command and Director General of the Planning Department of the Army Headquarters.

In August 2011, he was appointed Deputy Commander of the Army's Sixth Corps Command. In January 2012, he was promoted to lieutenant general, and he was promoted to the personnel vice minister of the Staff Headquarters of the Ministry of Defense. In January 2014, he served as commander of the Army's Sixth Corps Command. During his Six Army Commander's service, he was responsible for commanding troops to rescue the TransAsia Airways Flight 235 incident in 2015. In February 2015, he was promoted to the vice minister of the Ministry of Defense. His deputy commander, lieutenant general Ren Ji-nan succeeded him as the commander of the Sixth Corps Command and continued the casualty search and rescue mission.

Wang Shin-lung was promoted to the deputy chief of staff of the General Staff Headquarters of the Ministry of Defense in June 2016, he was promoted to general of the Army in December the same year, this make him the first Hualien born general. He was then appointed as the First Commander of the Army. He was the first graduate from the Army College Specialist Classes to serve the post in the history of the Republic of China (Air Force College Specialist Classes is Admiral Li Tianyu). After Wang Shin-lung took the office, on behalf of army officers and soldiers, he paid respects to the late President Chiang Ching-kuo and Chiang Kai-shek for their death anniversaries on January 13, 2017, and April 5 respectively in Taoyuan Daxi and Touliao mausoleums.

Honor Award As a citizen, Wang Shin-lung was award “Honorary Citizenship” of Hualien County, “Grand Protector of the Country”, Hualien County Council's “Heroic Defender of the Nation”, Xincheng Township's “Glory of Xincheng” Medal, and Hualien Engineering Electronics Polytechnic School's outstanding alumni.

As a soldier, Wang Shin-lung was awarded six medals of meritorious service, such as one 3rd grade “Order of the Cloud and Banner”, one 4th grade “Order of the Cloud and Banner”, and one “Order of Precious Tripod with Special Cravat” and three “Order of Loyalty and Diligence”.

He was also awarded with five medals for Armed Forces Service, such as one grade A-2 “Medal of the Armed Forces”, one A-1 grade “Medal of the Brilliant Light”, one A-2 grade “Medal of the Brilliant Light”, one A-1 grade “Medal of Victorious Garrison” and one A-2 grade “Medal of Victorious Garrison”. With a total of 16 medals for Army service, such as two “Medal of Army Brilliance”, three “Medal of Outstanding Service”, three “Medal of Outstanding Staff”, four “Medal of Army Achievement” and four “Medal of Excellent Efficiency”.

On 1 May 2023, Wang assumed the office of Strategic Advisor to the Presidential Office of the Republic of China, serving alongside Admiral Liu Ho-chien, Senior General Huoh Shoou-yeh, Admiral Lin Chen-yi, and General Hsiung Hou-chi.
