= Lee Tien-yu =

Taiwanese general and politician (1946–2024)

- 李天羽
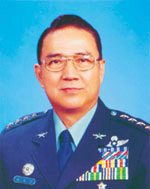

Minister of National Defense of the Republic of China
- In office 20 May 2007 – 24 February 2008
- Preceded by: Lee Jye
- Succeeded by: Michael Tsai

Chief of the General Staff of the Republic of China Armed Forces
- In office 20 May 2004 – 31 January 2007
- Preceded by: Lee Jye
- Succeeded by: Huo Shou-yeh

Personal details
- Born: 23 May 1946 Shandong, China
- Died: 12 December 2024 (aged 78) Neihu, Taipei, Taiwan
- Party: Kuomintang

Lee Tien-yu (Chinese: 李天羽; pinyin: Lǐ Tiānyǔ; Wade–Giles: Li T'ien-yü; 23 May 1946 – 12 December 2024) was a ROC Air Force general and defense minister of the Republic of China (Taiwan). He took office after the new premier, Chang, was inaugurated. Lee died of pneumonia complications at the Tri-Service General Hospital on 12 December 2024, at the age of 78.

Preceded by Lee Jye	ROC Minister of National Defense; 2007–2008	Succeeded by Michael Tsai
