= Chang Liang-jen =

Taiwanese politician and diplomat

- 張良任

Taiwanese Representative to Indonesia
- In office 22 January 2014 – December 2016
- Preceded by: Andrew Hsia
- Succeeded by: John C. Cheng

Taiwanese Representative to Israel
- In office January 2010 – January 2014
- Succeeded by: Chi Yun-sheng

Deputy Minister of National Defense
- In office 5 September 2008 – 15 September 2009
- Minister: Chen Chao-min
- Succeeded by: Andrew Yang

Personal details
- Born: 21 August 1946 (age 79) Anhui, China
- Education: National Chengchi University (BA, MA); Harvard University (MA)

Chang Liang-jen (Chinese: 張良任; pinyin: Zhāng Liángrèn; Wade–Giles: Chang Liang-jen; born 21 August 1946) is a Taiwanese politician and diplomat who was the Taiwanese Representative to Indonesia from 22 January 2014 until December 2016.

== Early life and education ==
Chang was born in Anhui, China, on August 21, 1946. He graduated from National Chengchi University in 1968 with a Bachelor of Arts (B.A.) in diplomacy and foreign affairs and then earned a master's degree in East Asian studies from the university in 1971. In 1980, he began graduate studies at Harvard University, where he earned a Master of Arts (M.A.) in international relations from the Harvard Kennedy School in 1984.

== Diplomatic career ==
Chang served as the Taiwanese representative to Israel from 2010 to January 2014, when he was appointed the representative to Indonesia.

In April 2014, Taiwanese businesspeople in Indonesia donated four garbage trucks through Chang to Jakarta Lieutenant Governor Basuki Tjahaja Purnama to help the city government to handle waste-related issues. Basuki responded by saying that Taiwan has helped Jakarta a lot in handling its continuous flood problems, citing other examples like Tzu Chi Foundation programs.

== See also ==
- Taipei Economic and Cultural Representative Office
- List of diplomatic missions of Taiwan
