= Chen Chao-min =

Taiwanese politician

- 陳肇敏
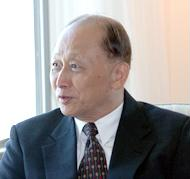

27th Minister of National Defense
- In office 20 May 2008 – 10 September 2009
- Deputy: Chang Liang-jen, Chao Shih-chang
- Preceded by: Michael Tsai
- Succeeded by: Kao Hua-chu

1st Deputy Minister (Armaments) of National Defense of the Republic of China
- In office 1 March 2002 – 1 March 2004
- Preceded by: Position established
- Succeeded by: Huoh Shou-yeh

Personal details
- Born: 10 July 1940 (age 85) Taichū Prefecture, Taiwan, Empire of Japan
- Party: Kuomintang
- Education: Republic of China Air Force Academy (BS); National Defense University (MS, MS); National Taiwan University (MBA)

Chen Chao-min (traditional Chinese: 陳肇敏; simplified Chinese: 陈肇敏; pinyin: Chén Zhàomǐn; born 10 July 1940) is a Taiwanese politician who was the Minister of National Defense of from 2008 to 2009.

== Education ==
After graduating from National Yuanlin Chongshi Industrial Vocational High School with a specialization in civil engineering, Chen graduated from the Republic of China Air Force Academy in 1962 and then enrolled in National Defense University, where he graduated in 1969 and was commissioned as a squadron officer in the Republic of China Air Force. He later completed further undergraduate studies at National Defense University in pilot training and war studies in 1976 and 1985, respectively. Chen later also earned a Master of Business Administration (M.B.A.) from the business school of National Taiwan University.

== Minister of National Defense ==
Chen resigned from the Ministry of National Defense ministerial post with the other cabinet members of Executive Yuan following the slow disaster response after Typhoon Morakot hit Taiwan in August 2009.

== Scandal ==
Chen involved an unjust case about the execution of Chiang Kuo-ching (江國慶; 10 October 1975 – 13 August 1997) that under his investigation when assume the office of Joint Air Operations Center (JAOC) in 1996. After the determination, he fined 14.74 million TWD for government compensation.

== See also ==
- Republic of China Armed Forces
