= Andrew Nien-dzu Yang =

Taiwanese professor and politician (born 1955)

Yang Nien-dzu
- 楊念祖
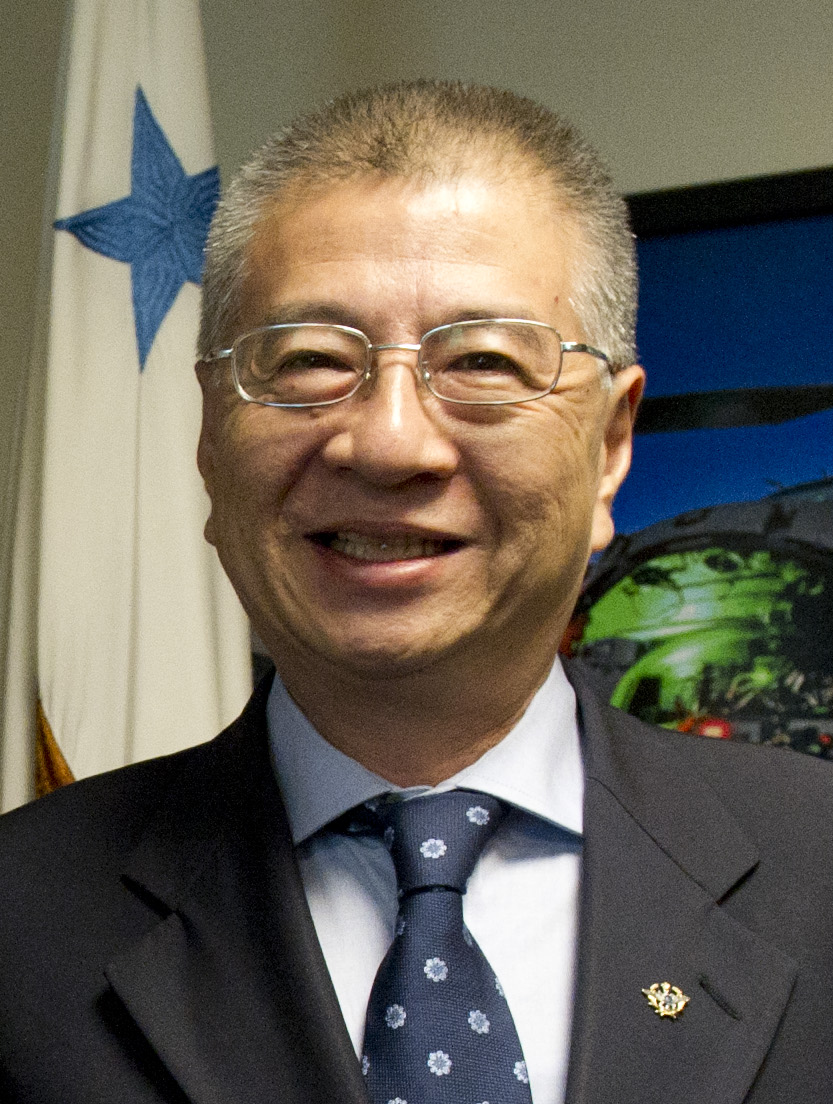

29th Minister of National Defense of the Republic of China
- In office 1 August 2013 – 6 August 2013
- Deputy: Kao Kuang-chi
- Preceded by: Kao Hua-chu
- Succeeded by: Kao Kuang-chi (acting); Yen Ming

7th Deputy Minister of National Defense (Policy) of the Republic of China
- In office 17 September 2009 – 1 August 2013
- Minister: Kao Hua-chu
- Preceded by: Chang Liang-jen
- Succeeded by: Andrew Hsia

Personal details
- Born: 15 May 1955 (age 71) Taipei, Taiwan
- Education: Fu Jen Catholic University (BA); University of Reading (MA); London School of Economics (MSc); Wolfson College, Oxford

Yang Nien-dzu (Chinese: 楊念祖; pinyin: Yáng Niànzǔ; born 15 May 1955), also known by his English name Andrew Nien-dzu Yang, is a Taiwanese international relations professor who served as the 29th Minister of National Defense of the Republic of China in 2013. Before this, he was the Deputy Minister of National Defense from 2009 to 2013.

== Early life and education ==
Yang was born in Taipei and his ancestral home is in Danyang, Jiangsu. He graduated from Fu Jen Catholic University in 1977 with a bachelor's degree in sociology and then went to England to complete graduate studies. While in the United Kingdom, he earned a master's degree in industrial sociology from the University of Reading in 1980, a Master of Science (M.Sc.) in economics from the London School of Economics in 1981, and completed graduate research at the University of Oxford as a research fellow of Wolfson College, Oxford, from 1982 to 1984.

Yang's studies specialized in the study of United States-Taiwan-China relations and national security. He had devoted much of his time in the research of building a cross-Taiwan Strait military mutual trust, the People's Liberation Army and regional security while teaching at universities and other academic institutions in Taiwan.

== Early career ==
Yang had been a research associate at the Sun Yat-sen Center for Policy Studies of the National Sun Yat-sen University in Kaohsiung in 1986–2000. Yang had been the adviser for the Ministry of Foreign Affairs in 1998, Mainland Affairs Council and Ministry of National Defense since 2000. He was a lecturer at the National Sun Yat-sen University in 2000–2009.

Prior to his appointment as ROC Deputy Minister of National Defense in 2009, Yang was the Secretary-General of the China Council of Advanced Policy Studies, a Taipei-based think tank concentrating on military affairs. He also has traveled frequently to the United States where he maintains a close relationship with top officials from The Pentagon.

== ROC Minister of National Defense ==
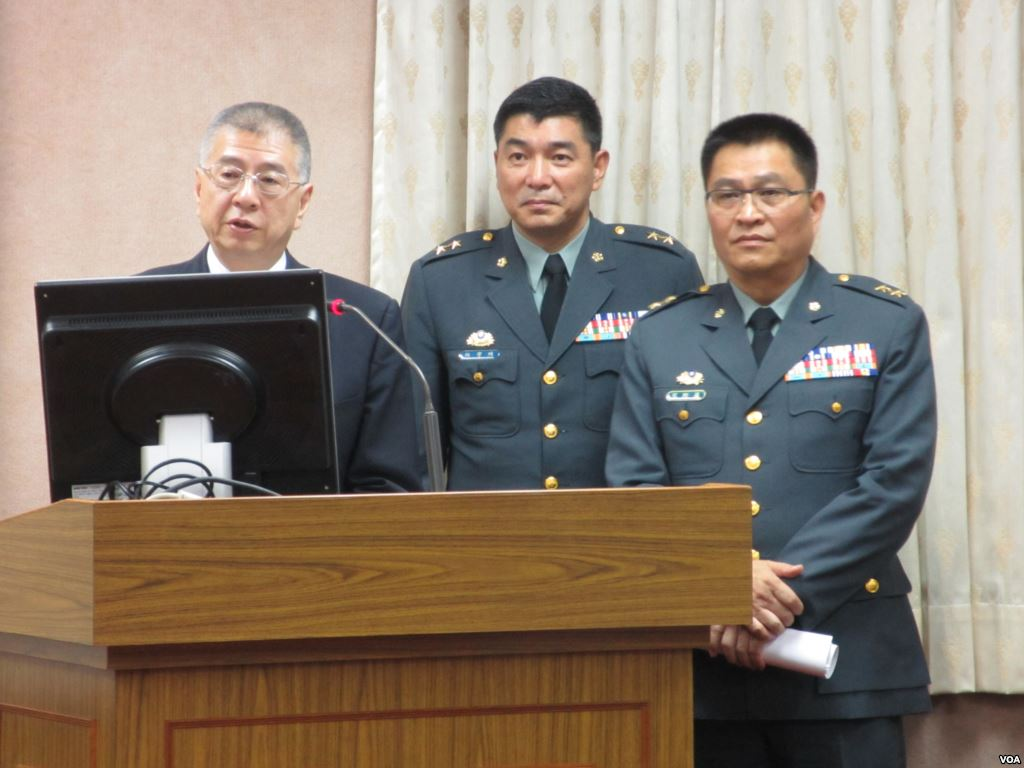
Defense Minister Yang and Lt. Gen. Chen Pao-yu and Lo Chi-chin in Legislative Yuan

=== Ministerial post appointment ===
On 29 July 2013, Premier Jiang Yi-huah announced a cabinet reshuffle for the first time since he took the Premiership on 18 February 2013. Yang was appointed to be the Minister of National Defense replacing Kao Hua-chu who had earlier tendered his resignation several times due to the death scandal of Corporal Hung Chung-chiu on 4 July 2013. Right after his appointment, Yang promised that he would review military administration, professional certification and supervisory systems to improve human rights. Yang was the first civilian to head the post since Ma Ying-jeou took the Presidential office on 20 May 2008.

=== Resignation ===
On 6 August 2013, Yang resigned from his position due to plagiarism allegations. Yang told the press that some portions of Ready for the D-day (決戰時刻：20XX年解放軍攻台戰役兵棋推演), the book he had written back in 2007 were written by his friends without proper citations. He decided to resign from his post to maintain the reputation of the Executive Yuan. Deputy Minister of National Defense, Kao Kuang-chi temporarily headed the ministry on 7 August until the official ministerial appointment of Yen Ming by the Executive Yuan on 8 August 2013.
