= Death of Hung Chung-chiu =

2013 death of army specialist Hung Chung-chiu

Hung Chung-chiu
- 洪仲丘
- Born: 8 September 1989
- Died: 4 July 2013 (aged 23)
- Military career
- Allegiance: Republic of China
- Rank: Specialist

The death of Hung Chung-chiu (Chinese: 洪仲丘; pinyin: Hóng Zhòngqiū; Wade–Giles: Húng Chùng-chiū; 8 September 1989 – 4 July 2013), a Republic of China (Taiwan) Army specialist in the 542nd Armor Brigade, occurred under suspicious circumstances while serving a detention sentence in a 269th Mechanized Infantry Brigade barrack during his conscription service spurred allegations of military abuse. The military investigation has led to the arrest and questioning of several officials, with the case eventually transferred to civilian prosecutors from Ministry of Justice. A court subsequently found 13 military officials guilty of various charges and handed out prison sentences of up to eight months.

His death sparked the resignation of Minister of National Defense Kao Hua-chu, an apology from President Ma Ying-jeou, public protests, major reforms to Taiwan's legal system including the abolition of court martial during peacetime, and doubts over the future of Taiwan's conscription program changes.

== Background ==
=== Biography ===
Hung Chung-chiu was raised in Taichung City by his biological uncle. He lived with his adoptive parents and older sister, Hung Tzu-yung. Hung attended the National Cheng Kung University, where he studied in its Transportation and Communication Management Science department. He was accepted to the master's program in said department, but chose to serve his conscription requirement prior to enrolling.

=== Military detention and death ===
Hung was serving in the 542nd Brigade in Hsinchu and had been set to be discharged on 6 July. Hung was sent to military detention at a Yangmei base on 28 June after he was found carrying a camera phone a few days prior. One of Hung's fellow conscripts alleged that Hung was wrongfully detained and the victim of a personal vendetta; Hung previously had been at odds with his superiors. Hung was ordered to perform strenuous exercise drills as part of his punishment, and was hospitalized on 3 July, after reportedly suffering a heatstroke and falling into a coma. Hung was initially sent to Ten-Chen Medical Hospital, but was subsequently transferred to Tri-Service General Hospital when his body temperature had risen to 44 °C (108 °F).

Hung died of organ failure on July 4, 2013, two days before he was due to be discharged from the military. Local media reported that his superiors had allegedly refused to give him water during a drill even though he had repeatedly asked for it.

== Investigation ==
On July 15, Taiwan's defense ministry released initial findings which showed that Hung should have only been given an administrative punishment and that even if he had committed an offense that merited a military detention punishment, that physical drills should not have been allowed under the heat and humidity he experienced.

Questions were raised on the medical and psychological report on Hung that was approved before he was sent for detention at 269th Brigade. Such a medical report would normally take a week to complete, but it was expedited within half a day which military investigators described as "unusual". Similar questions were raised on delays in emergency transport and treatment of Hung after he fell into coma at the detention barrack; Taiwanese media used civilian CCTV recordings of the journey to 819th Army Hospital to allege that the ambulance was traveling at a slow speed and its sirens turned off.

On 26 July, an autopsy report determined that the Hung's death was "inflicted by others".

A few witnesses who spoke to the media after the death of Hung have reportedly received death threats from unknown sources.

=== Missing CCTV evidence ===
Critical segments of the closed-circuit television (CCTV) recording that was recovered by investigations from the 269th Brigade that housed Hung in detention were discovered missing. Military investigators attempted to recover the data, but found both segments to contain only black screens. In one instance, all 16 CCTV cameras went blank for 80 minutes between 2pm to 3.20pm on 3 July. This has led to allegations of foul play by Hung's family, the Taiwanese media and opposition members from Legislative Yuan. Investigators from Taoyuan District Prosecutors Office have also joined in the investigation and have removed the entire 16-channel CCTV equipment from the detention barracks for further investigation. The missing CCTV evidence became a significant focus of this investigation.

Hung's soldier diary was also initially reported as lost, but was subsequently recovered and the last entry was dated 6 months before his death.

== Prosecutions ==
37 military officials received punishment over Hung's death, and 18 cases of criminal prosecutions were initiated under civilian courts. This included Hung's superiors in 542nd Brigade and officials from the military detention base at 269th Brigade. The highest and second highest-ranking officials to be prosecuted were Major General Shen Wei-chih and Colonel Ho Chiang-chun, commander and deputy commander of 542nd Brigade, respectively.

On 7 March 2014, the Taoyuan District Court found 13 military officials guilty of abuse of power and handed down sentences of up to eight months imprisonment:

- Company Commander Hsu Hsin-cheng received an eight-month imprisonment sentence for abuse of authority.
- Major General Shen Wei-chih, Colonel Ho Chiang-chung and four other officials were sentenced to six months imprisonment for their abuse of authority to detain Hung.
- Staff Sergeant Chen Yi-hsun, who oversaw Hung while he was in detention at 269th Brigade, received a six months imprisonment sentence for abuse which could be commuted to a fine.

Five more officials were acquitted due to insufficient evidence. The family found the sentences too light and "unacceptable", vowing to file an appeal to Taiwan High Court. The appeal was decided on 28 June 2017. Major General Shen Wei-chih, First Lieutenant Kao Yu-lung, and Sergeant Lo Chi-yuan were found not guilty. Six other defendants were subject to reduced sentences. The High Court decisions regarding Shen Wei-chih and Chen Yi-hsun were appealed to the Supreme Court, which upheld Shen's not guilty verdict and sentenced Chen to four months imprisonment and two years of probation.

== Public reaction ==
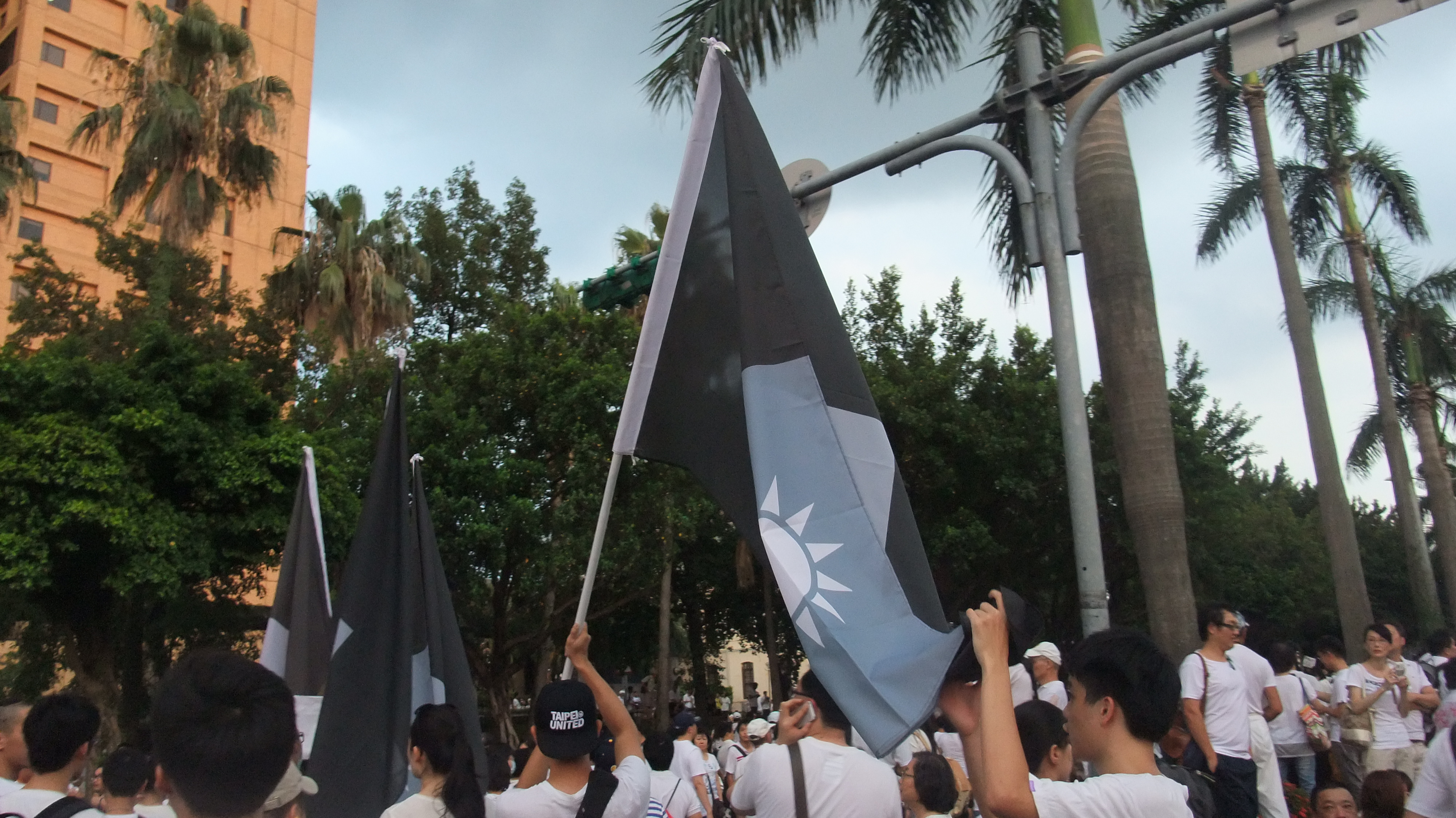
Public protest to defend Hung Chung-chiu by carrying dark ROC flag.

On 20 July 2013, 30,000 protestors known as Citizen 1985 gathered outside the defense ministry building, where Deputy Minister of National Defense Andrew Yang accepted a petition letter from protestors. The second protest, held on 3 August by the same group, attracted a record number of followers in Taiwan, reaching over 100,000. In response to these protests Legislative Yuan quickly approved major reforms to Taiwan's military justice system, which included the abolition of court martial during peacetime and transfer of military prisoners to civilian prisons.

Members of the 542nd Brigade attended Hung's funeral under intense media scrutiny. Taiwanese Minister of National Defense Kao Hua-chu tendered his resignation after the incident, but was initially declined by President Ma Ying-jeou. Kao's tendered his resignation again and this was approved on 30 July. His deputy Andrew Yang took his post. President Ma visited Hung's family and made assurances on a complete investigation, and has also made a public apology.

Taiwanese TV media and Hung's family have criticized the slow pace and opaqueness of the military investigation. In particular Chung T'ien Television's News Tornado have decided to conduct their own private investigation by inviting whistleblowers who had just discharged from the Army and media analysts on air; these whistleblowers alleged to have witnessed several military malpractices.

The Taiwanese government has offered compensation of NT$100 million (US$3.34 million) for Hung's death. The Hung family insisted that the military officials responsible should bear the compensation amount and rejected the offer, saying that they only consider this matter after the truth is revealed.

Hung's death has cast further doubts over Taiwan's military conscription program changes due to manpower shortfalls. Taiwan was supposed to transition to an all-volunteer force by 2015 and shorten military service from one year to four months. 17,447 recruitments were needed for 2013 and only 1,847 was achieved by July, and this incident has shaken public confidence making the target much more difficult to achieve.

Following the lower court rulings on the case, Citizen 1985 and netizens voiced disappointment at the sentences, and plan to organize another demonstration.

== See also ==
- Death of Martin Anderson
