= Lee Jye =

- 李傑
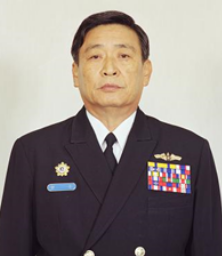

24th Minister of National Defense
- In office 20 May 2004 – 21 May 2007
- Prime Minister: Yu Shyi-kun; Frank Hsieh; Su Tseng-chang
- Deputy: Lee Chung-wei (administrative)
- Preceded by: Tang Yao-ming
- Succeeded by: Lee Tien-yu

Minister without Portfolio
- In office 20 May 2004 – 21 May 2007
- Prime Minister: Yu Shyi-kun; Frank Hsieh; Su Tseng-chang

18th Chief of the General Staff of the ROC Armed Forces
- In office 1 February 2002 – 19 May 2004
- President (Note: Commander-in-Chief of the national military): Chen Shui-bian
- Preceded by: Tang Yao-ming
- Succeeded by: Lee Tien-yu

Personal details
- Born: 6 June 1940 (age 85) Tientsin, Republic of China
- Party: Kuomintang (1958–2007); Independent (since 2007)
- Spouse: Cheng Hui-chin

Lee Jye (Chinese: 李傑; pinyin: Lǐ Jié; born 6 June 1940) is a Taiwanese former minister. He served as Minister of National Defense from 2004 to 2007 under the Chen Shui-bian government.

== Biography ==
Lee was born in Tianjin, China, on 6 June 1940. After the Chinese Civil War, he fled to Taiwan with his family during the Kuomintang retreat.

He originally joined the then ruling Kuomintang in the early days of his military career, but was later expelled by the KMT, who lost power after the 2000 presidential election, for complying with President Chen Shui-bian's orders to remove all Chiang Kai-shek statues from military bases.

He was the minister of the Ministry of National Defense of the Republic of China, and was a Senior Admiral in the Republic of China Navy when he retired.

== Notes ==
Preceded by Tang Yao-ming	ROC Minister of National Defense; 2004-2007	Succeeded by Lee Tien-yu
