= Chin Hsiao-hui =

Politician from Taiwan

- 金筱輝

Deputy Minister of Veterans Affairs Council of the Republic of China
- Incumbent
- Assumed office 21 March 2012
- Minister: Tseng Jing-ling; Tung Hsiang-lung

Personal details
- Born: 17 April 1951 (age 74) Taipei, Taiwan

Chin Hsiao-hui (traditional Chinese: 金筱輝; simplified Chinese: 金筱辉; pinyin: Jīn Xiǎohuī; born 17 April 1951) is a Taiwanese politician. He currently serves as the Deputy Minister of the Veterans Affairs Council of the Executive Yuan.
