= Mount Daxue =

Mountain in Taiwan

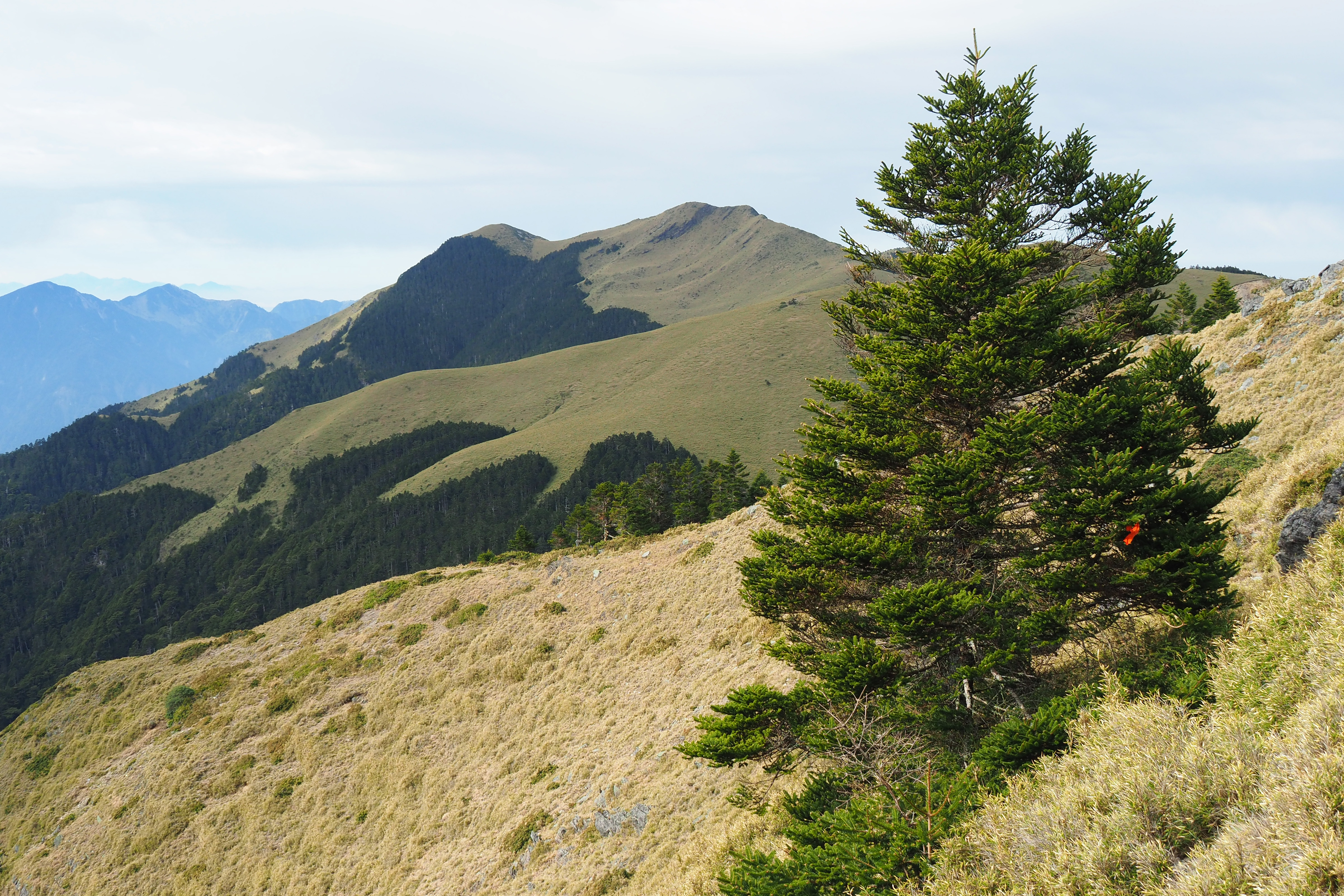

Highest point
- Elevation: 3,530 m (11,580 ft)
- Listing: 100 Peaks of Taiwan
- Coordinates: 24°20′31″N 121°07′29″E

Geography
- Location within Taiwan
- Location: Miaoli County/Taichung, Taiwan
- Parent range: Xueshan Range

Mount Daxue (Chinese: 大雪山; Hanyu Pinyin: Dàxuě Shān; Tongyong Pinyin: Dàsyuě Shan; Wade–Giles: Da^{4}-hsueh^{3} Shan^{1}; lit. 'big snow mountain') is a mountain in Taiwan along the Xueshan Range with an elevation of 3,530 m (11,580 ft).

The Dasyueshan National Forest Recreation Area in Heping District, Taichung, contains a section of Dasyueshan, consisting of several shorter peaks, with Siaosyueshan (Little Snow Mountain) being the tallest at 2997m. Formerly a logging area, many of the affected areas have been reforested and it has become a popular scenic destination and birdwatching spot. Bird species seen here include the Mikado pheasant, Swinhoe's pheasant, and Taiwan partridge.

== See also ==
- List of mountains in Taiwan
