= Wuling (disambiguation) =

Wuling may refer to:

== People ==
- Xu Wuling (许武岭, born 14 September 1971), professional rower
- Yu Wuling (于武陵, born 810), poet
- Zhang Wuling (张武龄, 1889-1938), educator
- King Wuling of Zhao (趙武靈王, 340-295 BCE), ruler of the State of Zhao during the Warring States Period

== Places ==
=== China ===
- Wuling District (武陵区), in Changde, Hunan
- Wuling Mountains (武陵山脉), mountain range in central China
- Mount Wuling (雾灵山), mountain in Beijing
- Wulingyuan (武陵源), scenic and historical site in Hunan, China
- Wuling, Chongqing (武陵镇), town in Wanzhou District
- Wuling, Guangxi (武陵镇), town in Binyang County
- Wuling, Henan (五陵镇), town in Tangyin County
- Wuling, Shanxi (武灵镇), town in Lingqiu County

=== Taiwan ===
- Wuling (mountain pass) (武嶺), mountain pass in Ren'ai, Nantou County
- Wuling Farm (武陵農場), tourist attraction in Heping, Taichung City
- Wuling National Forest Recreation Area (武陵國家森林遊樂區), in Heping, Taichung City

== Other ==
- Wuling (五菱), Chinese automotive brand
- Wuling Group (五菱集团), Chinese automotive manufacturer
- Wuling Motors (五菱汽车), Hong Kong-listed company controlled by Wuling Group
- SAIC-GM-Wuling (上汽通用五菱汽车), Chinese joint-venture between Wuling Group, General Motors and SAIC
- Wuling San Wan (五苓散丸), traditional Chinese medicine
- National Wu-Ling Senior High School (國立武陵高級中學), high school in Taoyuan, Taiwan

== See also ==
- Wulin (disambiguation)
