= Liu Kuo-chuan =

Taiwanese politician

- 劉國傳

Deputy Minister of Veterans Affairs Commission of the Republic of China
- Incumbent
- Assumed office 1 August 2007
- Minister: Tseng Jing-ling

Personal details
- Born: 29 September 1949 (age 77) Miaoli County, Taiwan
- Education: National Central University; National Tsing Hua University; National Chung Hsing University

Liu Kuo-chuan (Chinese: 劉國傳; pinyin: Liú Guózhuàn; born 29 September 1949) is a Taiwanese politician. He was the Deputy Minister of the Veterans Affairs Commission of the Republic of China.
