= Guguan (hot spring) =

Hot spring in Heping, Taichung, Taiwan

Guguan Hot Spring
- 谷關溫泉
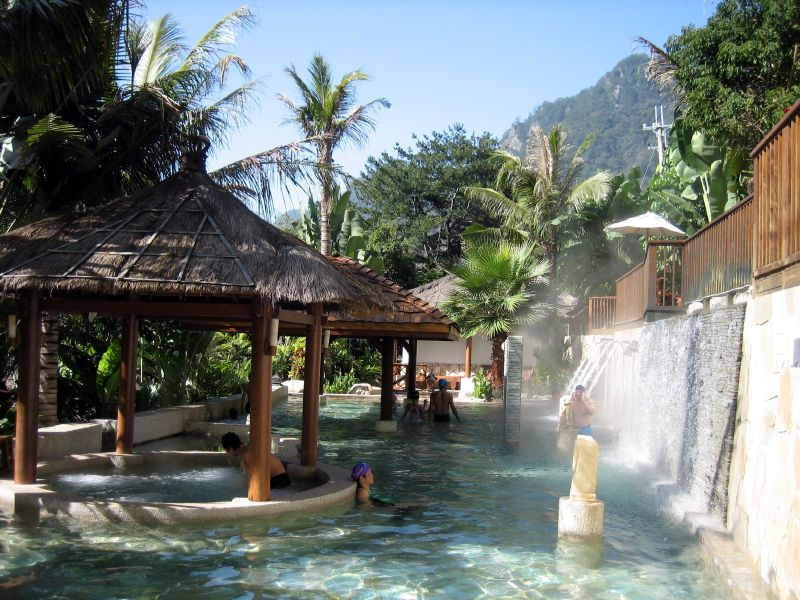

- Location within Taichung
- Interactive map of Guguan Hot Spring
- Location: Heping, Taichung, Taiwan
- Coordinates: 24°12′12.4″N 121°00′32.8″E
- Type: Hot spring

Guguan Hot Spring (Chinese: 谷關溫泉; pinyin: Gǔguān Wēnquán) is a hot spring located in Heping District, Taichung, Taiwan. It is accessible from Provincial Highway 8. It was previously named Meiji Onsen.

== History ==
During the period of Japanese rule, Guguan's hot spring was discovered by local aborigines. In 1927, the Japanese built a public bath.

On September 11–12, 1937, Kinji Yamada found many ancient stone artifacts in the area. During the 1950s, Liu Jih-Wann also found many stone artifacts, which in that area created the Guguan Archaeological Site.

After the Nationalists came to Taiwan, they planned a route across the island, passing through Guguan, which would be the Provincial Highway 8. When the road was finished, it brought tourism to Guguan, and Guguan thrived. It peaked at 1974, and because of poor management, Guguan made a turn for the worse. The 1999 Jiji earthquake caused massive damage to the highway, cutting the road in several sections. From the 37 km mark (Guguan) to the 62 km mark (Te-Chi), the damage was unknown. It was until 117 days later, on January 18, 2000, that the road was cleared

Although the road between Guguan and Te-Chi was reconstructed, Typhoon Mindulle of 2004 wrecked the road again. Now the road is blocked, and nobody is allowed to pass.

In July 2005, Typhoon Haitang wrecked a bridge between Guguan and the bottom of the mountain, stranding Guguan. A detour was created around the damaged area before another bridge was constructed.

== Geography ==
Guguan is 700–1000 m above sea level. It is located in the Xueshan Mountain Range. The Dajia River flows through Guguan. Two plateaus are on the side of the Dajia River. One is 740~780 m above sea level, the other 800~840 m above sea level. That's why there is Upper Guguan and Lower Guguan.

Upper Guguan is the location of Taiwan Power Company. Lower Guguan has developed into a hot spring resort area.

== See also ==
- Taiwanese hot springs
