= Xueshan =

Mountain in Taichung, Taiwan

Xueshan (雪山)
- Snow Mountain
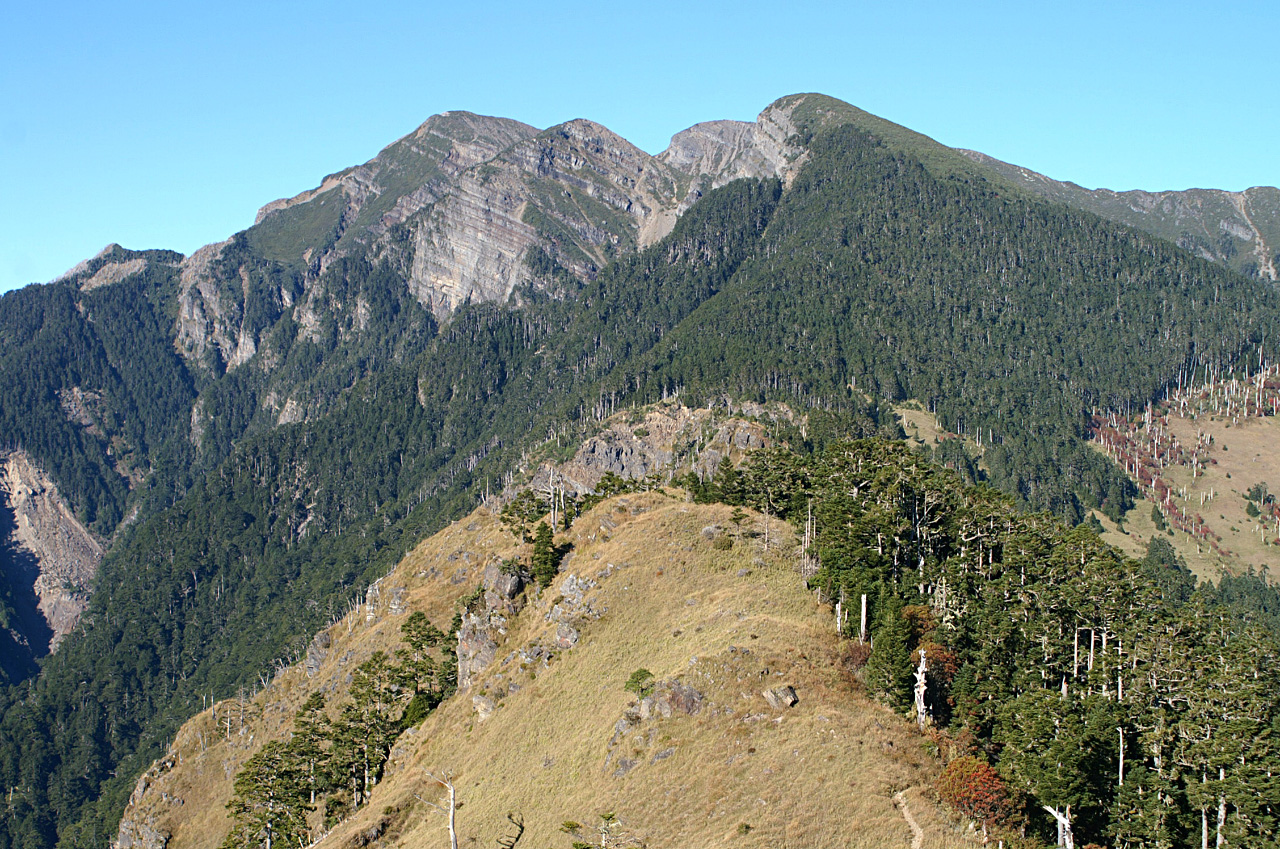
- The summit as seen from the east peak

Highest point
- Elevation: 3,886 m (12,749 ft)
- Prominence: 1,932 m (6,339 ft)
- Listing: Ultra, Ribu; 100 Peaks of Taiwan
- Coordinates: 24°23′00″N 121°13′48″E

Geography
- Location within Taiwan
- Location: Heping District, Taichung/ Tai'an, Miaoli County, Taiwan
- Parent range: Xueshan Range

Climbing
- Easiest route: Maintained trail, snow/ice climb during some winter months

Xueshan
- Chinese: 雪山
- Literal meaning: Snowy Mountain
Transcriptions
Standard Mandarin
- Hanyu Pinyin: Xuěshān
- Wade–Giles: Hsüeh-shan
- Tongyong Pinyin: Syuěshan
Southern Min
- Hokkien POJ: Seh-soaⁿ

Former names
- Chinese: 三叉山
- Literal meaning: 3-Prong Mountain
Transcriptions
Standard Mandarin
- Hanyu Pinyin: Sānchàshān
- Wade–Giles: San-ch‘a-shan

Tsugitakayama

Chinese name
- Chinese: 次高山
- Literal meaning: Next-Highest Mountain
Transcriptions
Standard Mandarin
- Hanyu Pinyin: Cìgāoshān

Japanese name
- Kanji: 次高山
Transcriptions
- Romanization: Tsugitakayama

Xueshan or Sekuwan (in Atayal, formerly known as Mount Sylvia among others) is a mountain in the Heping District of Taichung, Taiwan. It is the 2nd-highest mountain in Taiwan, at 3,886 m (12,749 ft) above sea level. It is located in the Shei-Pa National Park and is visible in good weather from hills near Taiwan's capital Taipei.

== Names ==
Xuěshān is the pinyin romanization of the Chinese name 雪山, meaning "Snowy Mountain", it is romanized as Hsüehshan using the previous Wade-Giles system. Japanese historian Taira Shidehara suggests that 雪 is short from 雪高翁, transliteration of Atayal Sekoan or Sekuwan which means "cracking into gravel".

During the Qing Dynasty, the mountain was known to Westerners as Mount Sylvia. It was also known as Shan-chas-shan (properly, Sānchāshān) from a Chinese name meaning "3-Forked" or "3-Prong Mountain". During Japan's occupation of Taiwan, improved surveys showed that Xueshan was shorter than Yushan on Taiwan but taller than Mount Fuji in the Japanese Islands. Its name was accordingly changed to Tsugitakayama (次高山), meaning "Next-" or "Second-Highest Mountain", in 1923.

== History ==
The mountain was first climbed in 1935 by Japanese climbers.

The Japanese governor-general designated Xueshan part of the Tsugitaka-Taroko National Park by the Governor-General of Taiwan on 12 December 1937.

== Climbing ==
Xueshan is a part of the Shei-Pa National Park and so climbers are required to apply for a park entry permit. This can be done 5–60 days in advance. International hikers can apply for a park entry permit between 35 days and 4 months in advance. After that a police mountain entry permit must be applied for. This can be done at the police station in Wuling Farm on the spot.

There are two cabins on the trail. The first, Chika Cabin, is at the 2.0 kilometers (1.2 mi) mark. The second, 369 Cabin, is at the 6.9 kilometers (4.3 mi) mark. Both cabins are spartan, and contain bunker style beds. Hikers must bring their own sleeping and cooking gear.

The peak is at the 10.9 kilometers (6.8 mi) mark.

== Gallery ==
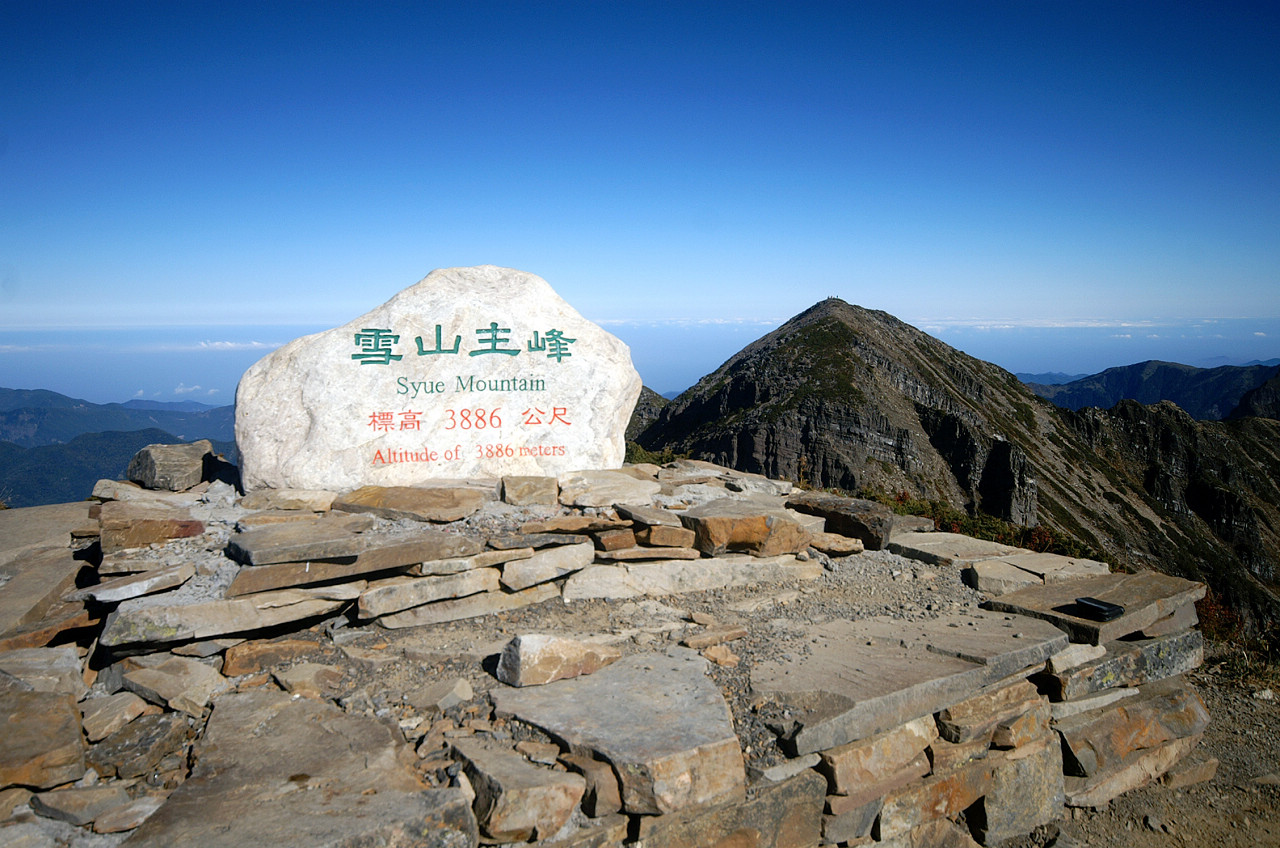
Xueshan Main Peak

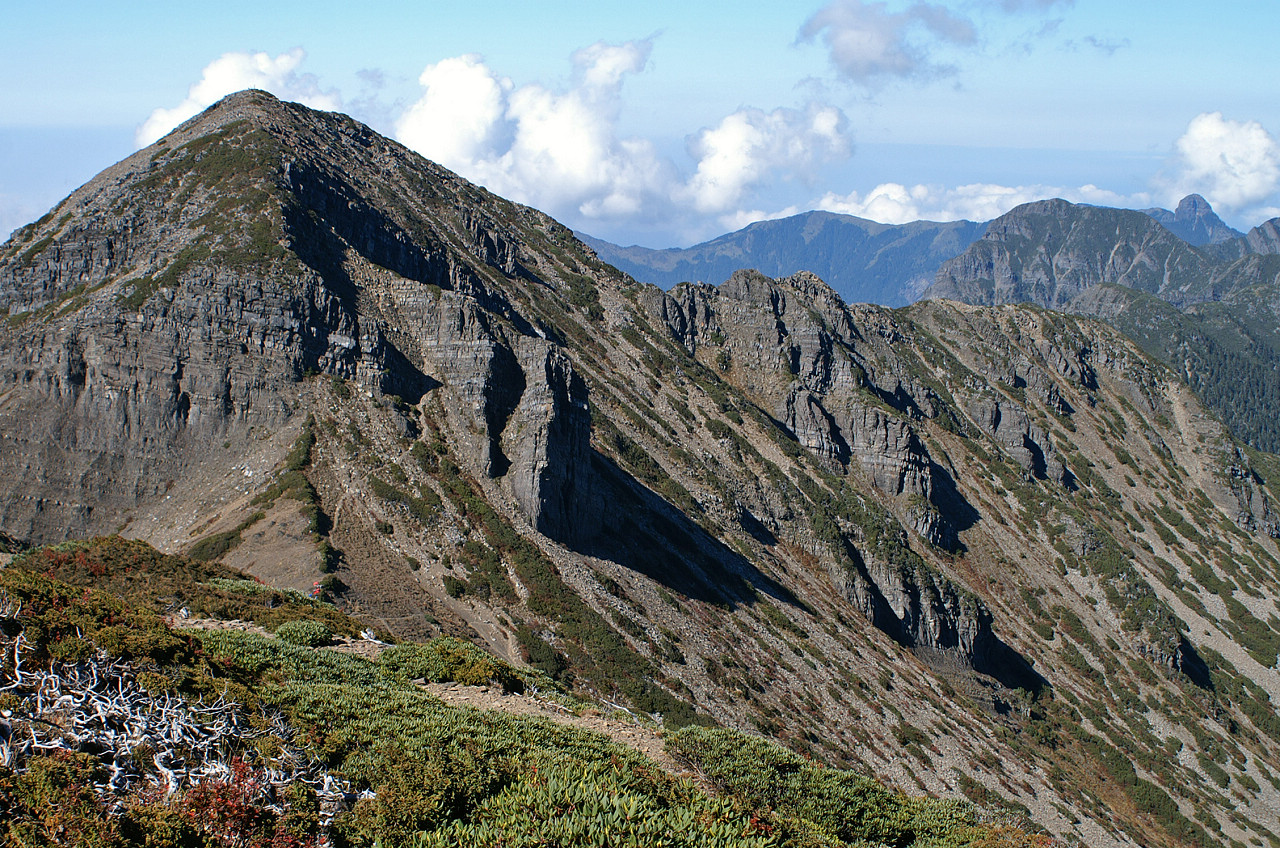
Shengleng Trail (Holy Ridge Trail)

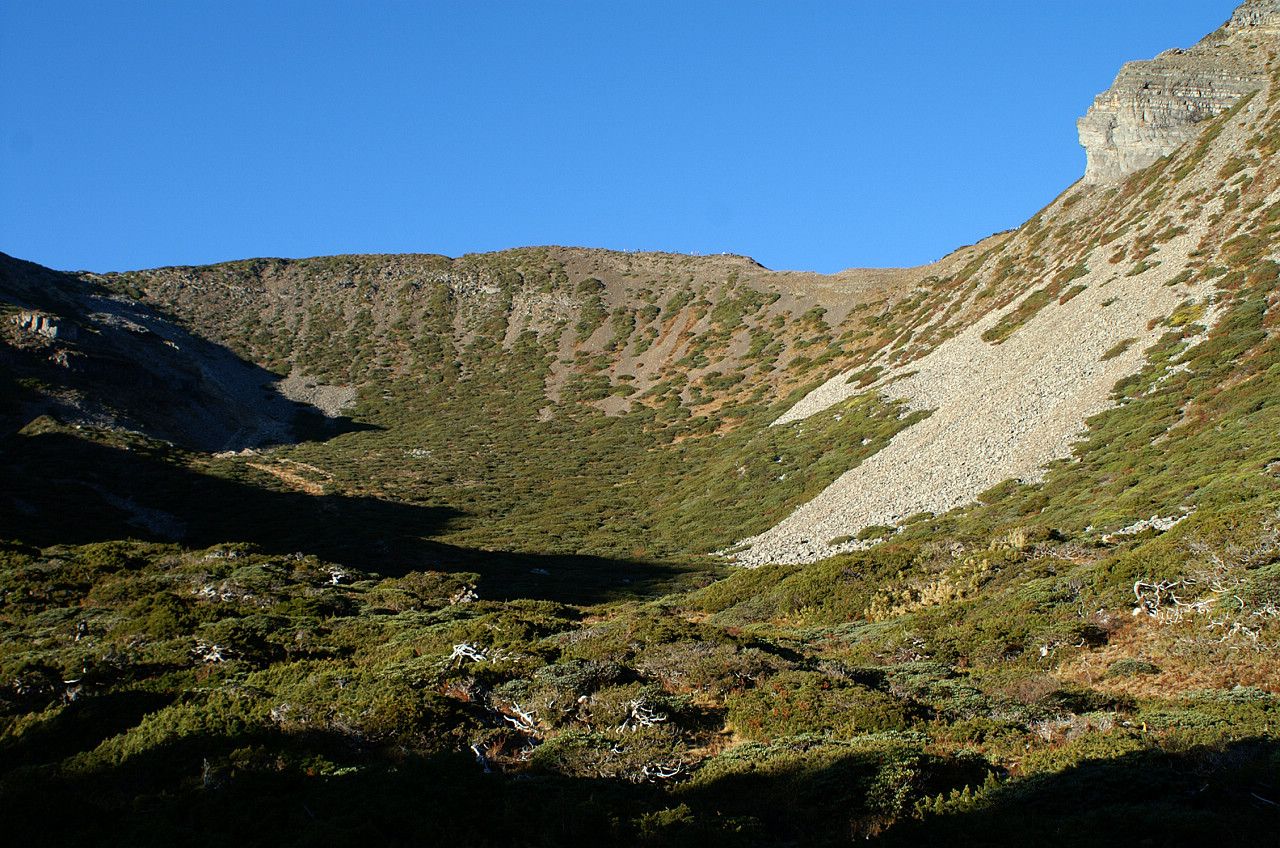
Cirque or Landslide Valley #1

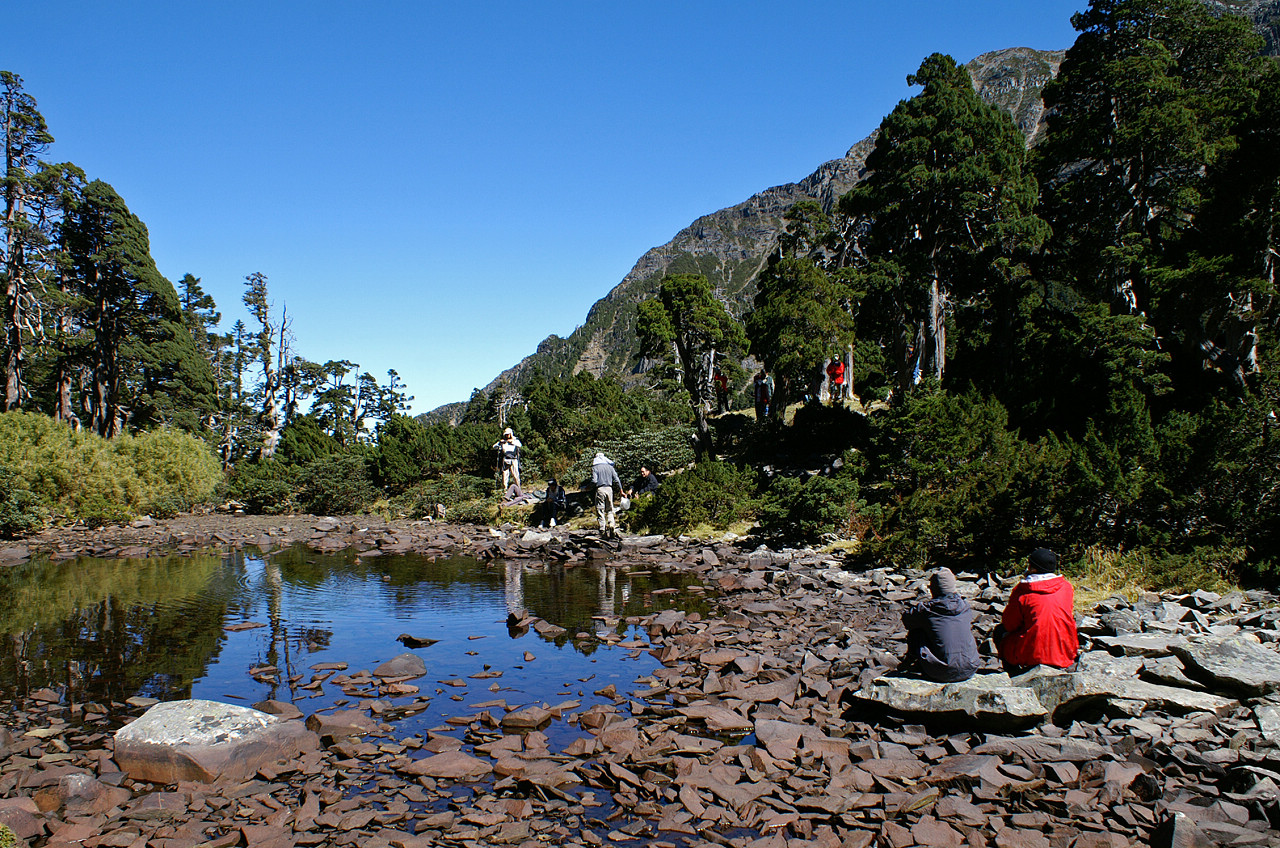
Cui Pond

== See also ==
- 100 Peaks of Taiwan
- List of mountains in Taiwan
- List of ultras of Tibet, East Asia and neighbouring areas
- Shei-Pa National Park
- Taroko National Park
- Xueshan Range
- Hsuehshan Tunnel
