= Taoshan Waterfall =

Waterfall in Heping, Taichung, Taiwan

Taoshan Waterfall 桃山瀑布
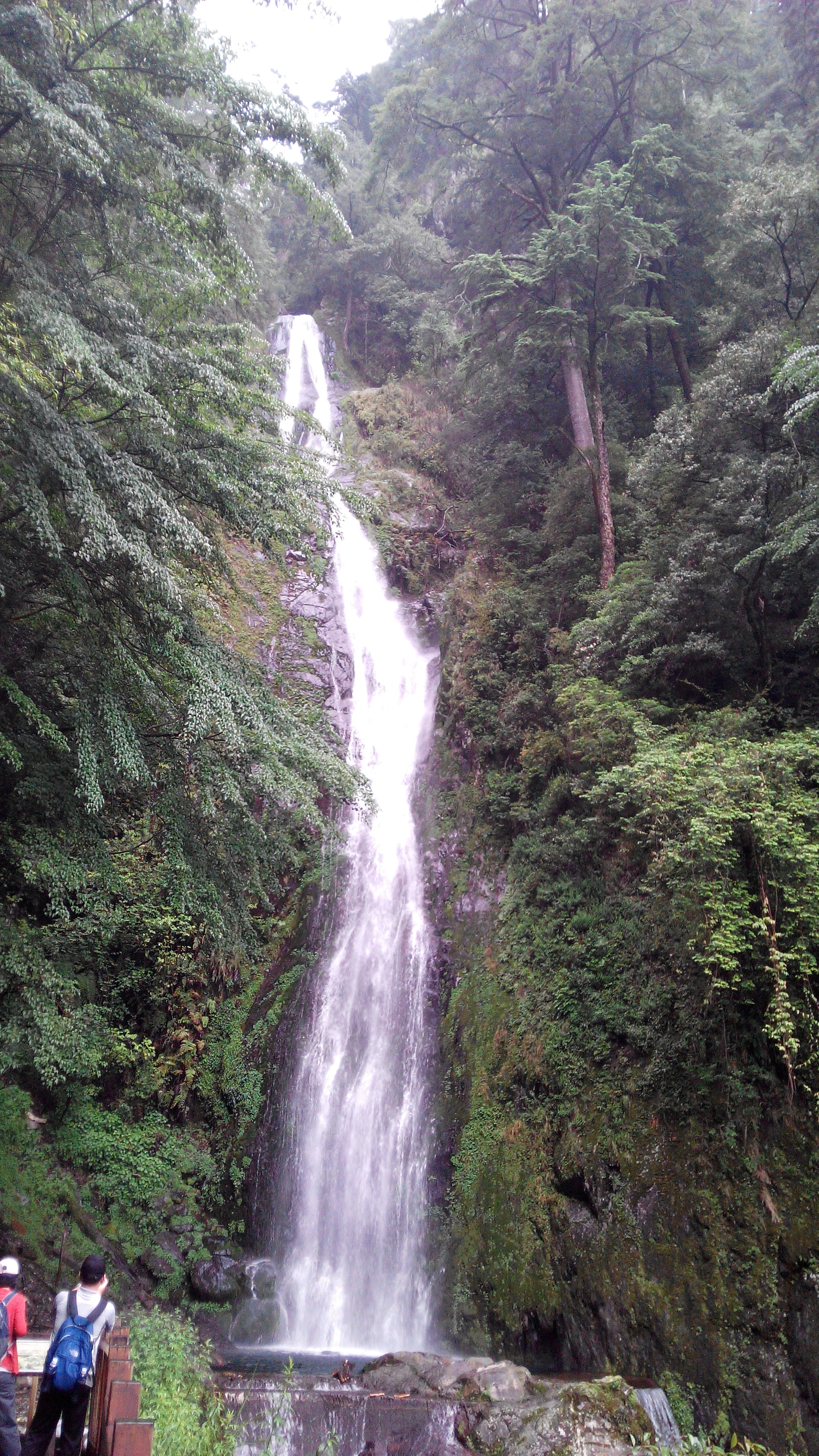
- Interactive map of Taoshan Waterfall 桃山瀑布
- Location: Heping District, Taichung, Taiwan
- Coordinates: 24°24′49.5″N 121°18′9.2″E
- Type: waterfall
- Total height: 80 m (260 ft)

The Taoshan Waterfall (Chinese: 桃山瀑布; pinyin: Táoshān Pùbù), also known as Yansheng Waterfall (traditional Chinese: 煙聲瀑布; simplified Chinese: 烟声瀑布; pinyin: Yānshēng Pùbù), is a waterfall in Heping District, Taichung, Taiwan.

== Geology ==
The waterfall is one of the six tallest waterfalls in Taiwan. It is located at the end of Taoshan Trail in the Wuling National Forest Recreation Area. Its altitude is 2,200 m (7,200 ft) with the height difference of around 80 m (260 ft).

== Transportation ==
The base of the waterfall is accessible by bus from Taichung Station of Taiwan Railway.

== See also ==
- List of waterfalls
