= Wuling National Forest Recreation Area =

Forest in Heping, Taichung, Taiwan

Wuling National Forest Recreation Area Chinese: 武陵國家森林遊樂區
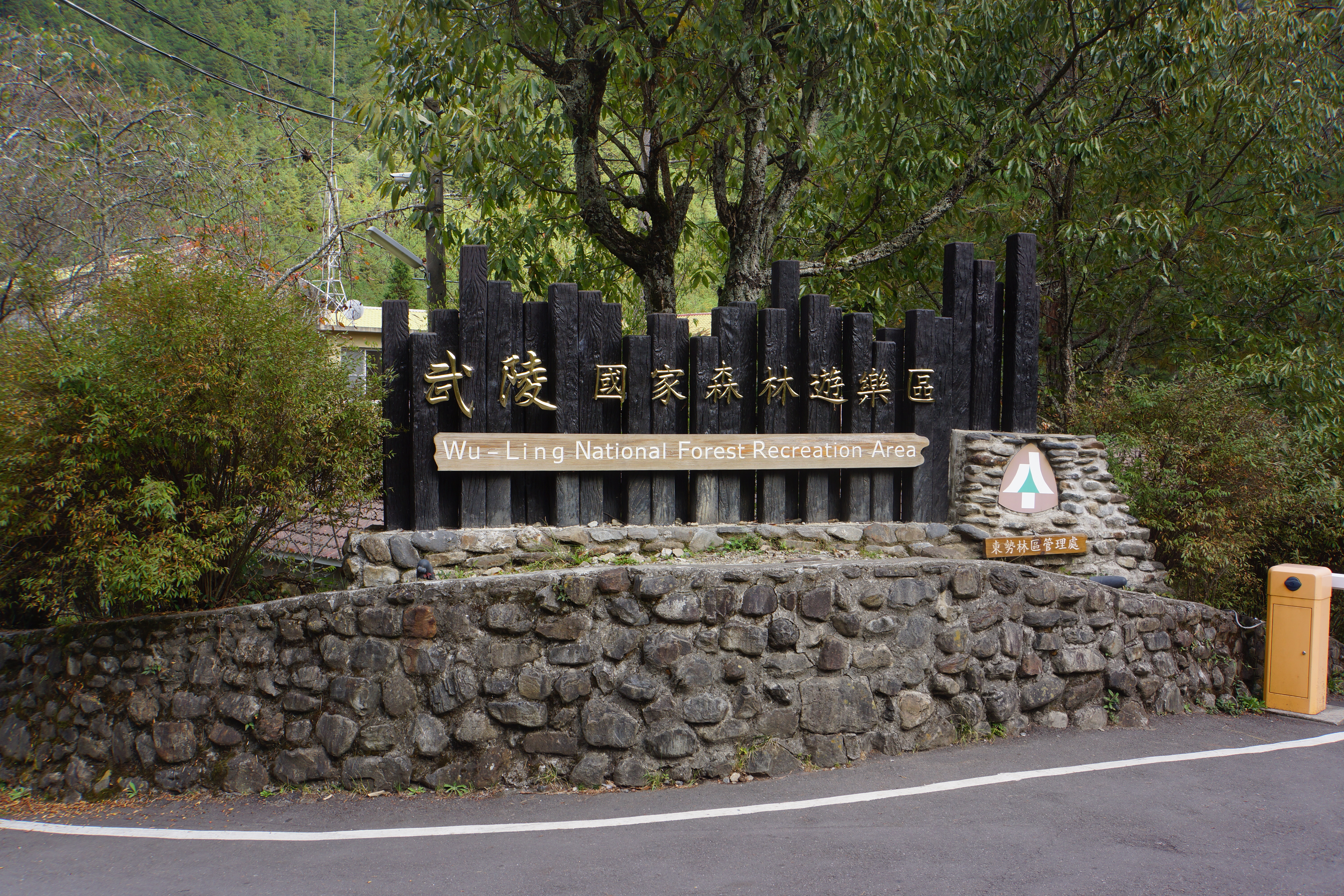

- Location within Taichung
- Interactive map of Wuling National Forest Recreation Area

Geography
- Location: Heping, Taichung, Taiwan
- Coordinates: 24°24′13.4″N 121°18′14.3″E
- Elevation: 1,800–3,884 m (5,906–12,743 ft)

Taoshan Trail

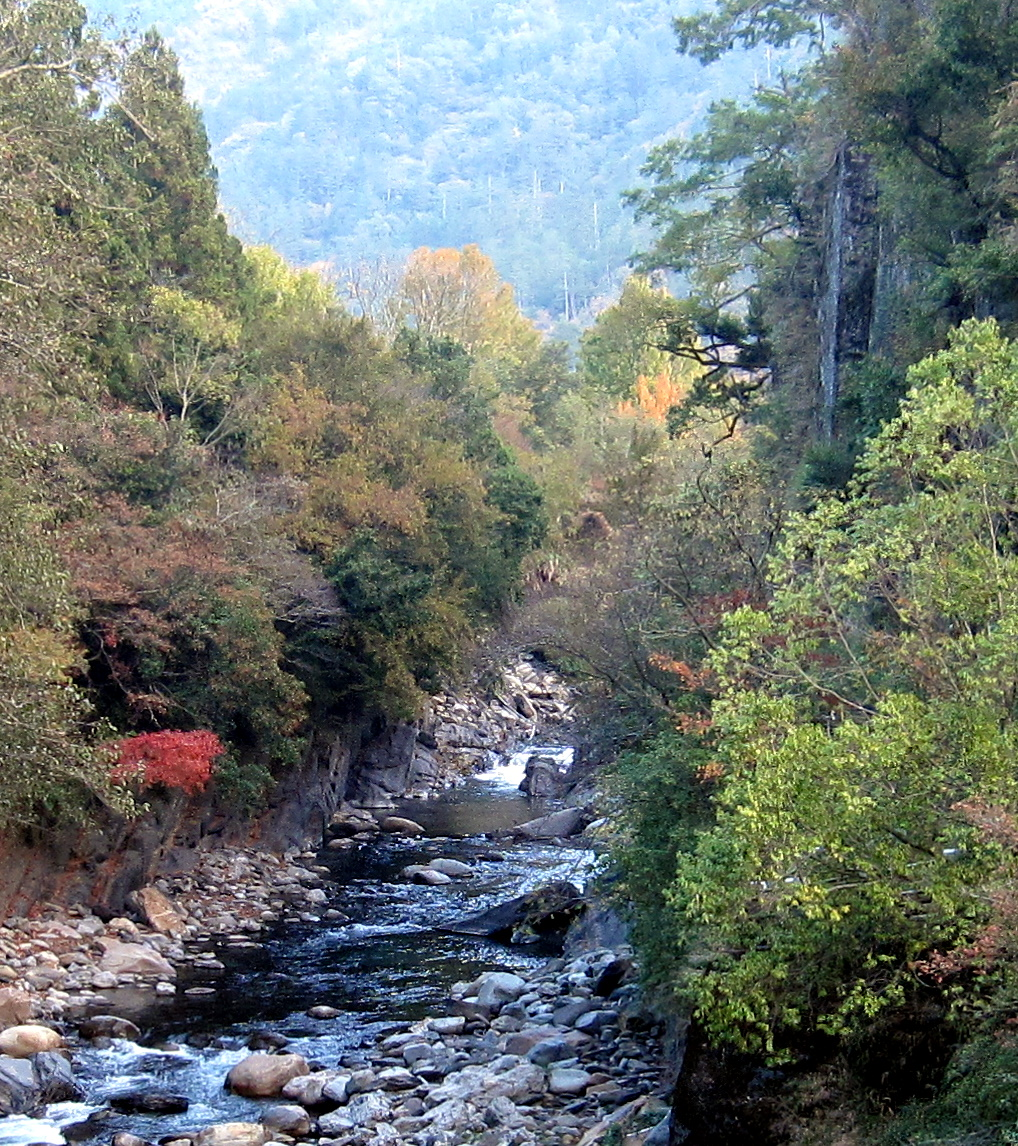
Cijiawan River, the native habitat of the Formosan landlocked salmon

Wuling National Forest Recreation Area (traditional Chinese: 武陵國家森林遊樂區; simplified Chinese: 武陵国家森林游乐区; pinyin: Wǔlíng Guójiā Sēnlín Yóulè Qū) is located in Heping District, Taichung, Taiwan.

== Geology ==
The forest recreation area spans over an area at the elevation of 1,800-3,884 meters above sea level with annual mean temperature of 16°C. It features the Taoshan Waterfall at the end of the Taoshan Trail.

== Transportation ==
The recreation area is accessible by bus from Taichung Station of Taiwan Railway.

== See also ==
- Geography of Taiwan
- Wuling Farm
- Taoshan Waterfall
