= Qingjing Farm =

Farm in Ren'ai, Nantou County, Taiwan

Qingjing Farm 清境農場
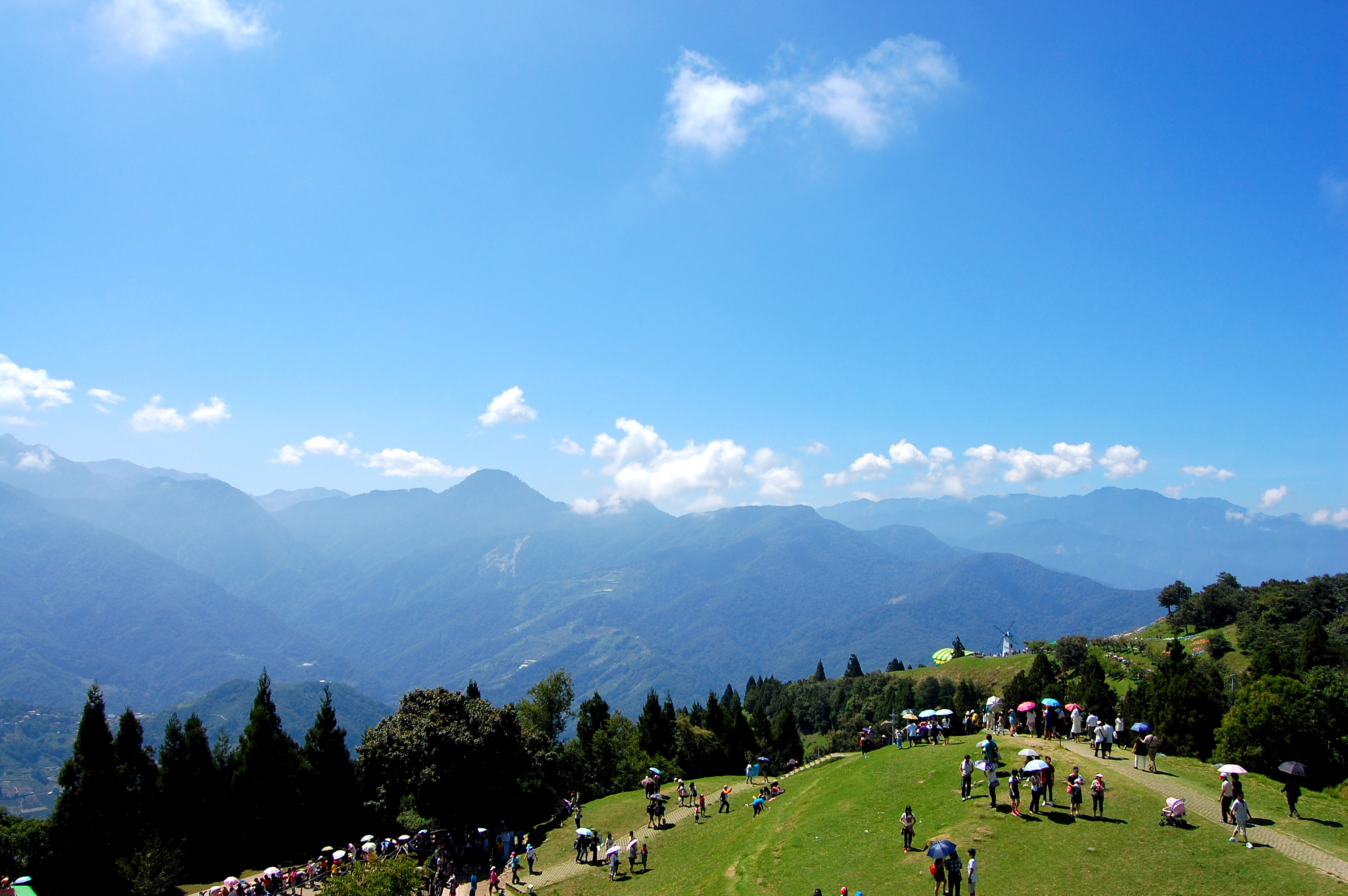
- Town/City: Ren'ai, Nantou County, Taiwan
- Coordinates: 24°03′31″N 121°09′50″E
- Established: 20 February 1961
- Owner: Veterans Affairs Council
- Area: 760 ha (1,900 acres)
- Website: Official website

The Qingjing Farm (traditional Chinese: 清境農場; simplified Chinese: 清境农场; pinyin: Qīngjìng Nóngchǎng), also known as Cingjing Farm, is a tourist attraction farm in Ren'ai Township, Nantou County, Taiwan. Located at an altitude of 1,700 ~2,000 meters, it's known as one of the three major high mountain farms in Taiwan, besides Wuling Farm and Fushoushan Farm.

== History ==
The farm was established on 20 February 1961 as the settling place for the demobilized soldiers and their dependents who were listed in the armed forces.

== Geology ==
The farm is located at an altitude of 1,700 to 2,000 meters above sea level and spans over an area of 760 hectares. The average daily temperature is 16°C with daily variation of around 2―5°C.

== Facilities ==
- Tourist Center
- Green Green Grasslands
- Small Swiss Garden
- Recreation Center
- Shoushan Park
- Guest House
- Stock Nurturing Center

== Transportation ==
The farm is accessible by bus from Taichung TRA station or Taichung HSR station.

== See also ==
- List of tourist attractions in Taiwan
