= Wulin =

Wulin may refer to:

== Hangzhou ==
- Wulin (Chinese: 武林), the ancient name and chiefly literary or poetic synonym of Hangzhou
  - Wulin Lakes (武林水), the ancient name of West Lake, Hangzhou
  - Wulin Academy of Arts (武林書畫院), the art academy of Hangzhou
  - Wulin Square (武林廣場), a public square in the centre of Hangzhou

== Towns in China ==
- Wulin, Guangxi (武林镇), a town in Pingnan County, Guangxi, China
- Wulin, Heilongjiang (五林镇), a town in Yangming District, Heilongjiang, China
- Wulin, Hubei (乌林镇), a town in Honghu, Hubei

== Martial arts ==
- Wulin (Chinese: 武林; lit. 'martial forest') is the fictional society of Chinese martial arts heroes in Wuxia fiction. Wulin is considered a part of the broader term jianghu, which refers to a social world outside the mainstream of Chinese society.

== See also ==
- Wuling (disambiguation)
