= Teng Tsu-lin =

Taiwanese politician

- 鄧祖琳

Minister of Veterans Affairs Commission of the Republic of China
- In office 6 February 2003 – 20 May 2004
- Preceded by: Yang Teh-chih
- Succeeded by: Kao Hua-chu

Military service
- Allegiance: Republic of China
- Branch/service: Republic of China Army
- Battles/wars: Third Taiwan Strait Crisis

Teng Tsu-lin (traditional Chinese: 鄧祖琳; simplified Chinese: 邓祖琳; pinyin: Dèng Zǔlín) is a politician in the Republic of China. He was the Minister of Veterans Affairs Commission of the Executive Yuan in 2003–2004.

== See also ==
- Veterans Affairs Commission
