= Basianshan National Forest Recreation Area =

Forest in Heping, Taichung, Taiwan

Basianshan National Forest Recreation Area Chinese: 八仙山國家森林遊樂區
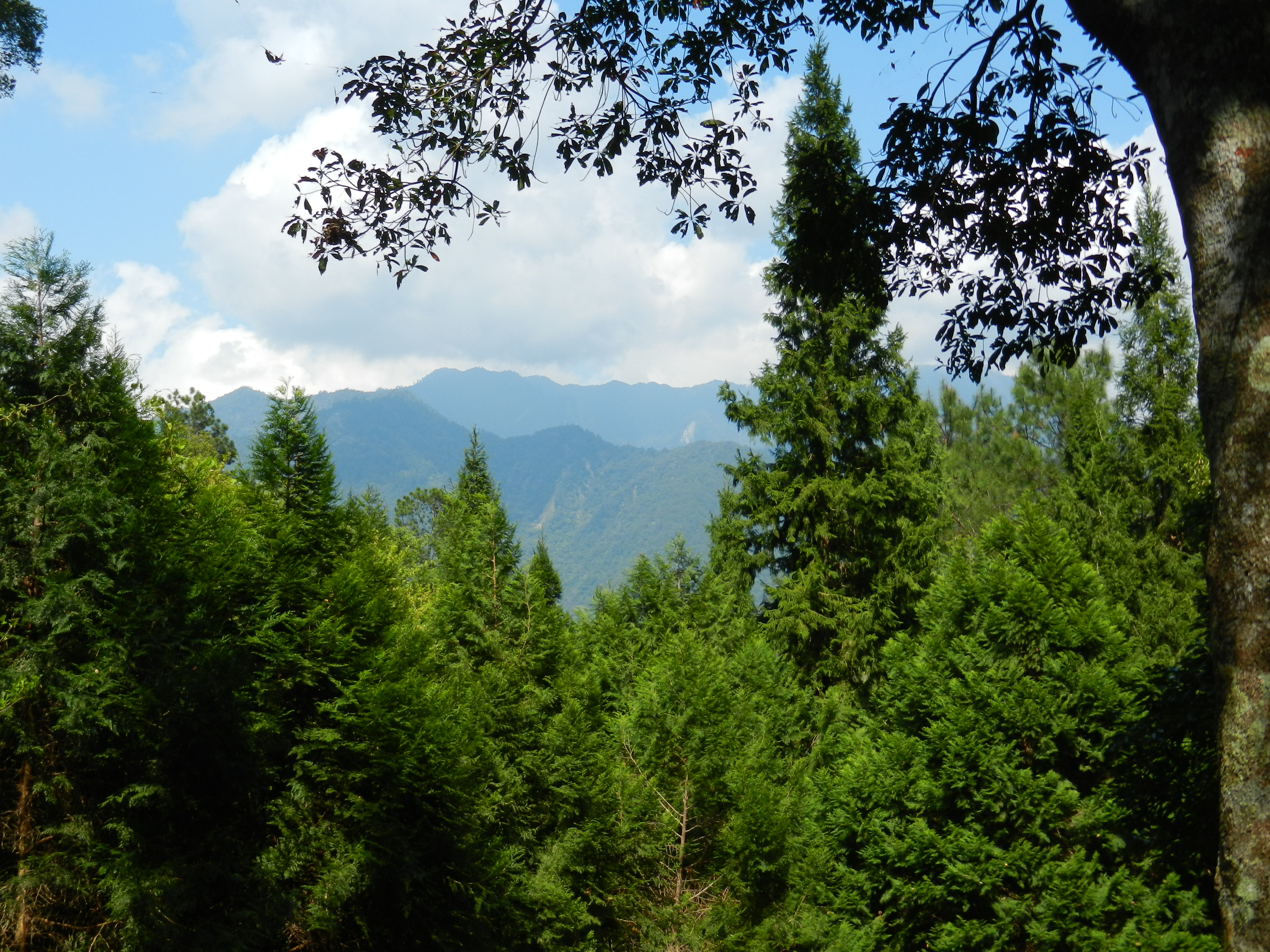

- Location within Taichung

Geography
- Location: Heping, Taichung, Taiwan
- Coordinates: 24°11′31.5″N 121°00′54.6″E
- Elevation: 750–2,366 m (2,461–7,762 ft)
- Area: 24 km^{2} (9.3 sq mi)

Administration
- Established: 1970s

Forest entrance gate

Basianshan National Forest Recreation Area (traditional Chinese: 八仙山國家森林遊樂區; simplified Chinese: 八仙山国家森林游乐区; pinyin: Bāxiānshān Guójiā Sēnlín Yóulè Qū) is located in Bo'ai Village, Heping District, Taichung, Taiwan.

== History ==
It was one of the main logging center alongside Mount Ali and Mount Taiping during the Japanese rule. In the mid 1970s, the area was designated as national forest recreation area. The forest suffered heavy damaged in the aftermath of Jiji earthquake in 1999 and Typhoon Toraji and Typhoon Nari in 2001.

== Geology ==
The recreation area is located at an altitude of 750–2,366 meters above sea level and spans over an area of 24 km^{2}. The highest point of the forest area is central Mount Basian. The mean annual temperature of the forest is 18°C. The forest features various streams and rivers.

== See also ==
- Geography of Taiwan
