= Fushoushan Farm =

Farm in Heping, Taichung, Taiwan

Fushoushan Farm 福壽山農場
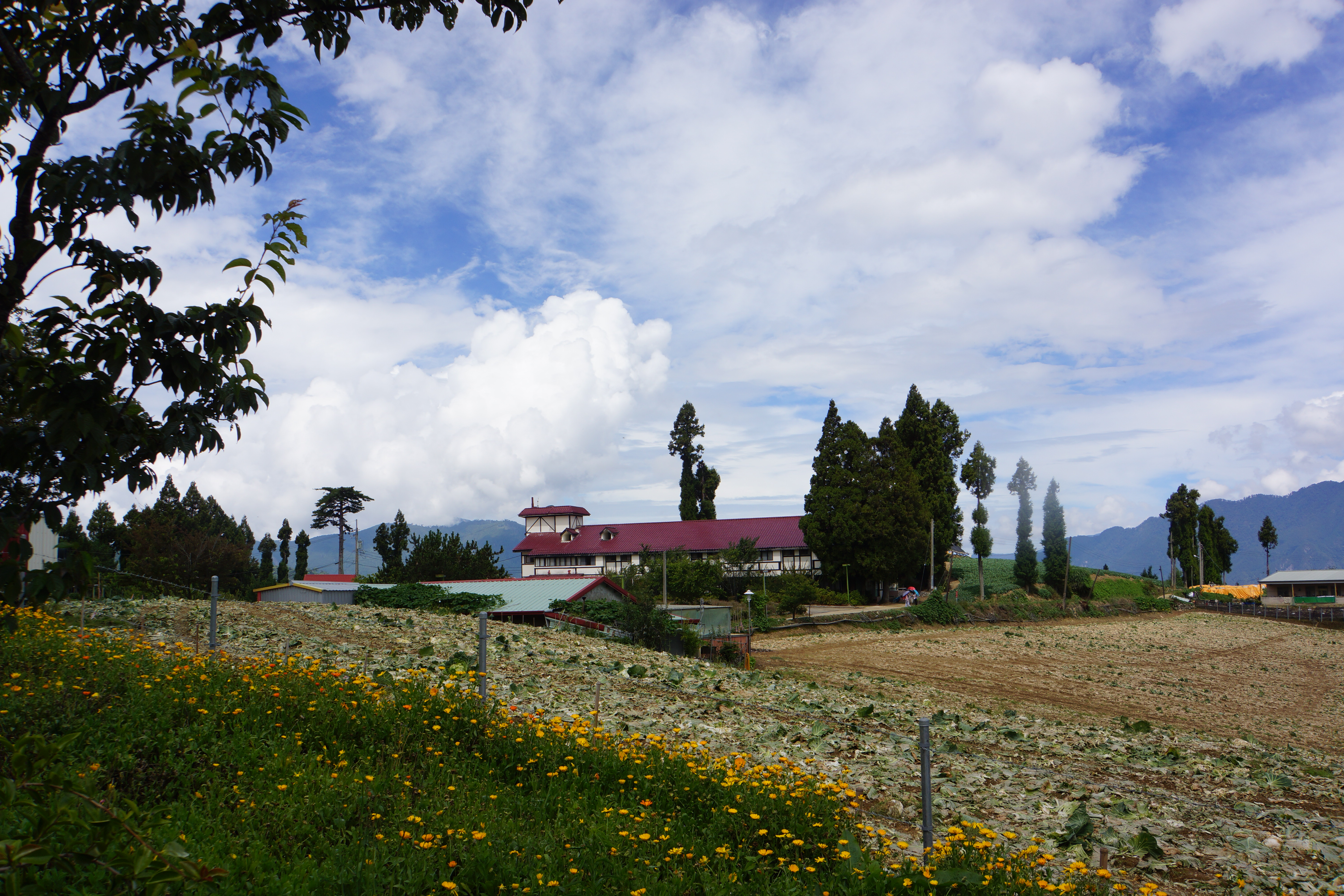
- Town/City: Heping, Taichung, Taiwan
- Coordinates: 24°14′40.7″N 121°14′43.3″E
- Established: 1 June 1957
- Owner: Veterans Affairs Council
- Area: 800 ha (2,000 acres)
- Website: Official website

Fushoushan Farm (traditional Chinese: 福壽山農場; simplified Chinese: 福寿山农场; pinyin: Fúshòushān Nóngchǎng) is a tourist attraction farm in Lishan Village, Heping District, Taichung, Taiwan. With an altitude of 2,100~2,614 meters, it is the highest tourist farm in Taiwan and is known as one of the three major high mountain farms in Taiwan, besides Wuling Farm and Qingjing Farm.

== History ==
The farm was originally established on 1 June 1957 when 100 Republic of China Armed Forces veterans were sent by the Veterans Affairs Council to develop the area into an agricultural site.

== Geography ==
The farm spreads over an area of 800 hectares at altitudes between 2,100 and 2,614 meters above sea level. Its land is surrounded by mountains. Crops include fruits, vegetables, and flowers. The farm also features guest houses and camping areas, which are the highest public camping areas in Taiwan.

== See also ==
- List of tourist attractions in Taiwan
- Agriculture in Taiwan
