= Eight Immortals Mountain =

Mountain in Heping, Taichung, Taiwan

Coordinates: 24°09′15.5″N 121°00′42.9″E

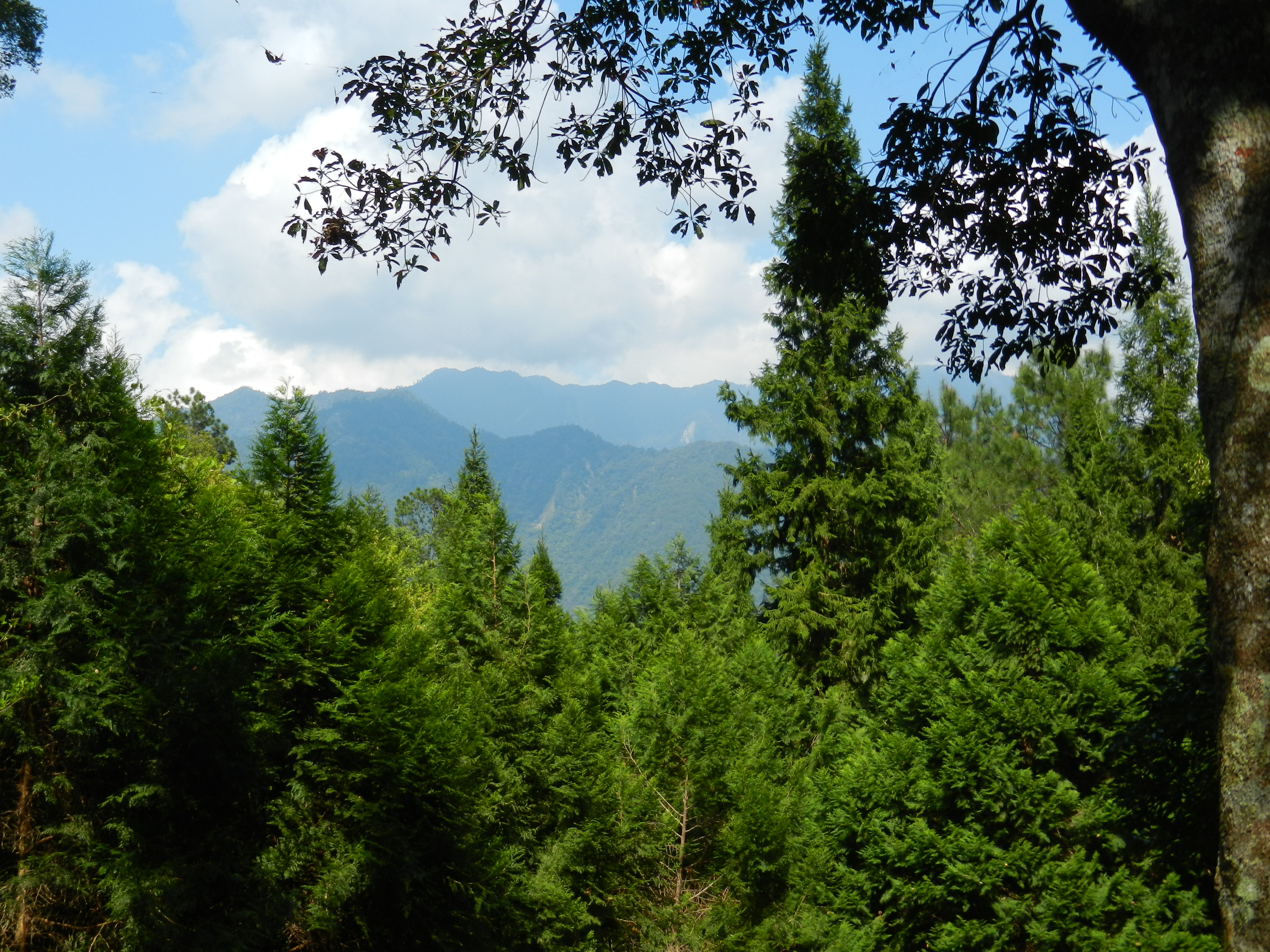
Eight Immortals Mountain

The Pa-hsien Mountain (Chinese: 八仙山; pinyin: Bāxiānshān), or Eight Immortals Mountain, is a mountain in Heping District, Taichung, Taiwan. It is a branch of Mount Yu. Its height is 2,448 metres, which is around 8,000 Taiwanese feet (台尺). The pronunciation of eight thousand (baqian) and eight immortals are similar in Chinese, hence the name.

One of the three major logging stations in Taiwan used to be in the forest. There is an amusement park located on the part of the mountain that is located in Heping District. It is estimated that there are 59 native birds and 5 migratory birds.

== See also ==
- Eight Immortals
- Penglai Mountain
