= Mount Baigu =

Mountain in Nantou and Taichung, Taiwan

- Location within Taiwan

Highest point
- Elevation: 3,341 m (10,961 ft)
- Coordinates: 24°12′09.5″N 121°06′32.2″E

Naming
- Native name: 白姑大山 (Chinese)

Geography
- Location: Heping, Taichung, Taiwan

Mount Baigu (Chinese: 白姑大山; pinyin: Báigū Dàshān), also known as Mount Xalut, is a mountain in Heping District, Taichung, Taiwan. The mountain has an elevation of 3,341 m.

== See also ==
- List of mountains in Taiwan
