= Tseng Jing-ling =

Taiwanese politician

- 曾金陵

13th Minister of Veterans Affairs Commission of the Republic of China
- In office 10 September 2009 – 1 August 2013
- Deputy: Chin Hsiao-hui; Liu Kuo-chuan
- Preceded by: Kao Hua-chu
- Succeeded by: Tung Hsiang-lung

Personal details
- Born: 14 September 1947 (age 79) Nanchang, Kiangsi, Republic of China
- Education: Republic of China Military Academy

Tseng Jing-ling (Chinese: 曾金陵; pinyin: Zēng Jīnlíng; born 14 September 1947) is a Taiwanese politician who served as a Republic of China Army general. He was the Minister of the Veterans Affairs Commission of the Executive Yuan from 2009 to 2013.

== Early career ==
Tseng was born in Nanchang, Jiangxi, and was moved to Taoyuan, Taiwan after the Chinese Civil War. Prior to entering political work, Tseng was the President of the National Defense University. Tseng currently lived in Taoyuan District, Taoyuan City.
