= Lishan Culture Museum =

Museum in Heping, Taichung, Taiwan

- 梨山文物陳列館
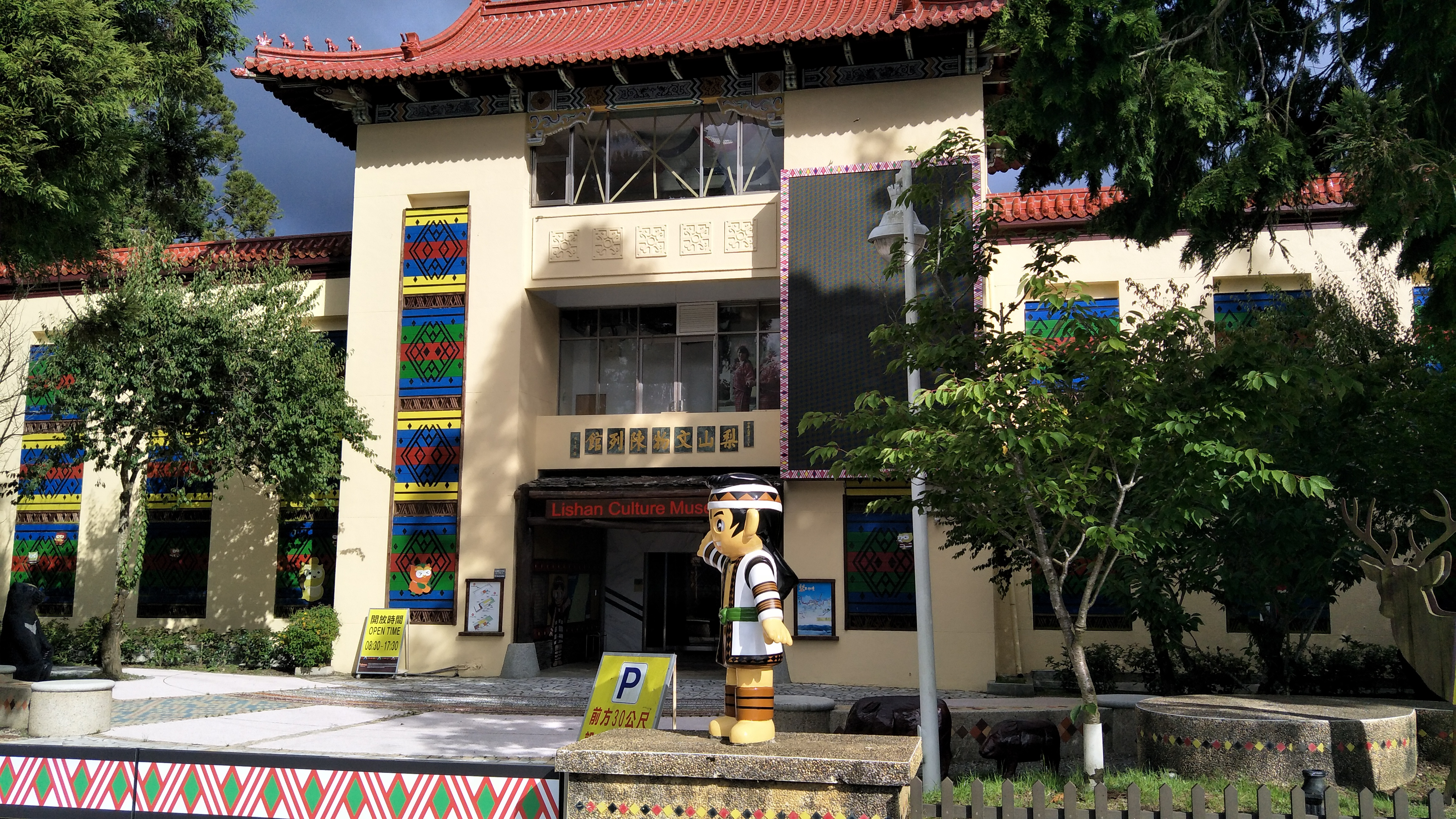
- Established: 1971
- Location: Heping, Taichung, Taiwan
- Coordinates: 24°15′08.9″N 121°15′22.9″E
- Type: museum

The Lishan Culture Museum (traditional Chinese: 梨山文物陳列館; simplified Chinese: 梨山文物陈列馆; pinyin: Líshān Wénwù Chénliè Guǎn) is a museum in Lishan Village, Heping District, Taichung, Taiwan.

== History ==
The museum was established in 1971.

== Architecture ==
The museum is housed in a 2-story building. Behind the museum building lies a green maple forest.

== Exhibitions ==
The museum displays the history of Central Cross-Island Highway construction, culture of Atayal people and the nature of Lishan.

== Transportation ==
The museum is accessible by bus from Hualien City, Taichung or Yilan City.

== See also ==
- List of museums in Taiwan
