= Hsuehshan Tunnel =

Longest highway tunnel in Taiwan and the 5th longest in the world

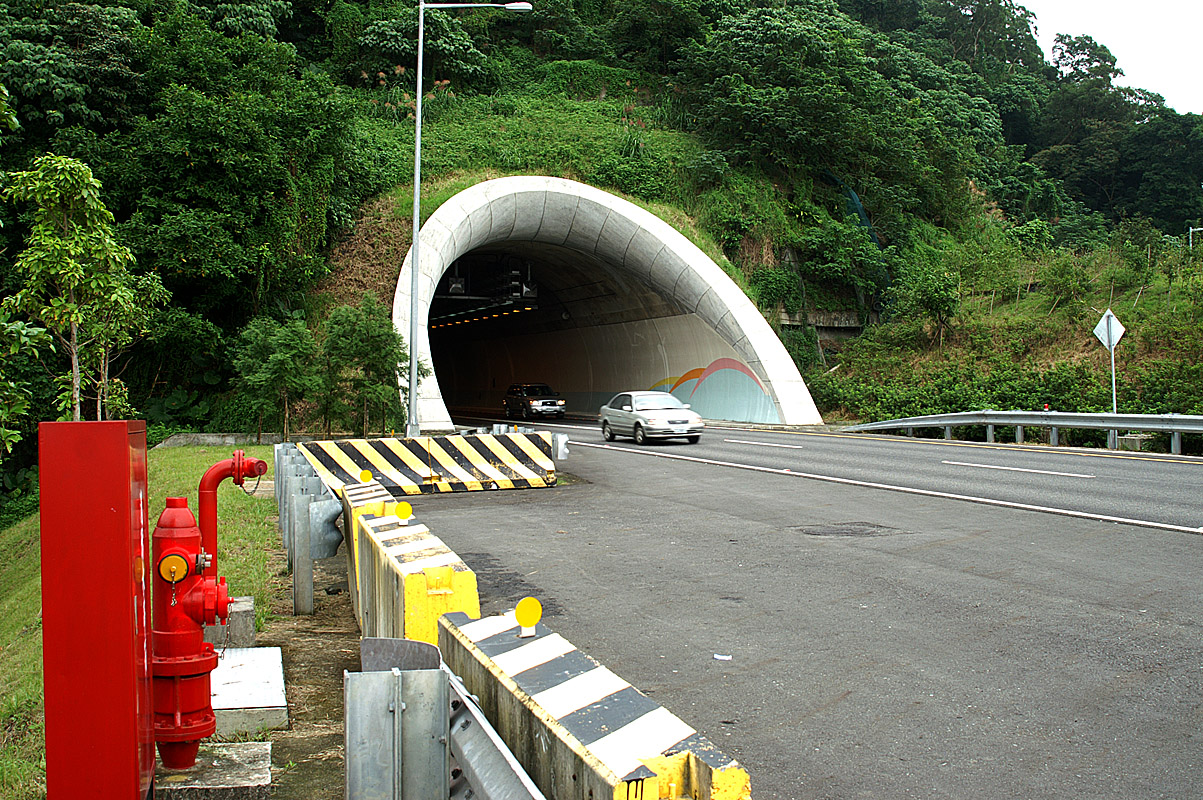
- Hsuehshan Tunnel East Entrance
- Interactive map of Hsuehshan Tunnel

Overview
- Official name: 雪山隧道
- Location: Taiwan
- Coordinates: North Entrance: 24°56′18.96″N 121°42′54″E; South Entrance: 24°50′52.08″N 121°47′27.6″E
- Status: Active
- Start: Pinglin District, New Taipei City
- End: Toucheng Township, Yilan County

Operation
- Work began: July 1991
- Opened: June 16, 2006
- Operator: Freeway Bureau
- Traffic: Road tunnel

Technical
- Length: 12.941 km (8.041 mi)
- No. of lanes: 4
- Operating speed: 70 to 90 km/h
- Max elevation: 208 m (682 ft)
- Min elevation: 44 m (144 ft)

Hsuehshan Tunnel
- Traditional Chinese: 雪山隧道
Transcriptions
Standard Mandarin
- Hanyu Pinyin: Xuěshān Suìdào
- Wade–Giles: Hsüeh^{3}-shan^{1} Sui^{4}-tao^{4}
- Tongyong Pinyin: Syuěshan Suèidào
Southern Min
- Hokkien POJ: Soat-san Pōng-khang
- Tâi-lô: Suat-san Pōng-khang

Alternative Chinese name
- Traditional Chinese: 雪山磅空
Transcriptions

The Hsuehshan Tunnel (Chinese: 雪山隧道), formally known as Pinglin Tunnel (坪林隧道), is the longest highway tunnel in Taiwan, located on the National Freeway 5. It opened on June 16, 2006.

== Overview ==
The tunnels are bored through the Hsuehshan Range. The road connects Taipei through New Taipei to Yilan County, cutting down the journey time from two hours to just half an hour. It bypasses the rural district of Pinglin, which used to receive high traffic prior to the completion of the tunnel. One of the key aims of constructing the tunnel was to connect the western coast of Taiwan, where 95% of the population lives, to the eastern coast of the island and in doing so tackle the unbalanced development on the island. It is constructed with one pilot tunnel and two main tunnels for eastbound and westbound traffic. The total length is 12.942 km (8.042 mi), making the Hsuehshan Tunnel the ninth longest road tunnel in the world (fifth at the time of opening) and sixth longest in East Asia. The tunnel opened in June 2006 to severe traffic jams.

== Tunnel Construction ==
Tunnel construction began in July 1991 and took 15 years to complete and cost a total of NT$90.6 billion (US$2.83 billion). Tunnel construction used 370,000 m^{3} (13,000,000 cu ft) of concrete, 2,000 kilometers (1,200 mi) of cables, and 2,000 lighting units.

While excavating the tunnel, engineers encountered difficult geological problems such as fractured rock and massive inflows of water, which caused severe delays. One of the three TBMs on the westbound tunnel was buried by a ground collapse. In order to speed up the tunnel boring, an additional working interface in Interchange Station No. 2 (under Ventilation Shaft No. 2) was built. Along the tunnel alignment, there are six major faults, ninety-eight fracture zones, and thirty six high-pressure groundwater sources. Hence, serious tunnel collapses with groundwater flooding took place periodically during tunnel construction. Altogether, 25 people died during 15 years of construction.

== Operations ==
When traveling through the Hsuehshan Tunnel, vehicles must not exceed the 90 km/h (56 mph) limit; otherwise the drivers face a NT$3,000 (US$93.75) to NT$6,000 (US$187.5) fine. The usual minimum speed limit is 70 km/h. Additionally vehicles must maintain a separation distance of 50 m (164 ft) under normal situations. Even when the speed is less than 20 km/h (12 mph) due to congestion, a separation distance of 20 m (66 ft) must still be maintained. Double solid lines prohibit lane changes. Automated road-rule enforcement cameras are used to monitor speeders, tailgaters, and those who unlawfully change lanes. Announcements of zero tolerance of speeding meant that those traveling at 71 km/h would be fined. After creating controversies, effective 00:00 (UTC+8) on September 16, 2006, a tolerance of 10 km/h has been allowed so speeds up to 80 km/h are no longer automatically penalized.

As of Nov 1, 2010, the speed limit was raised to 90 km/h to allievate traffic.

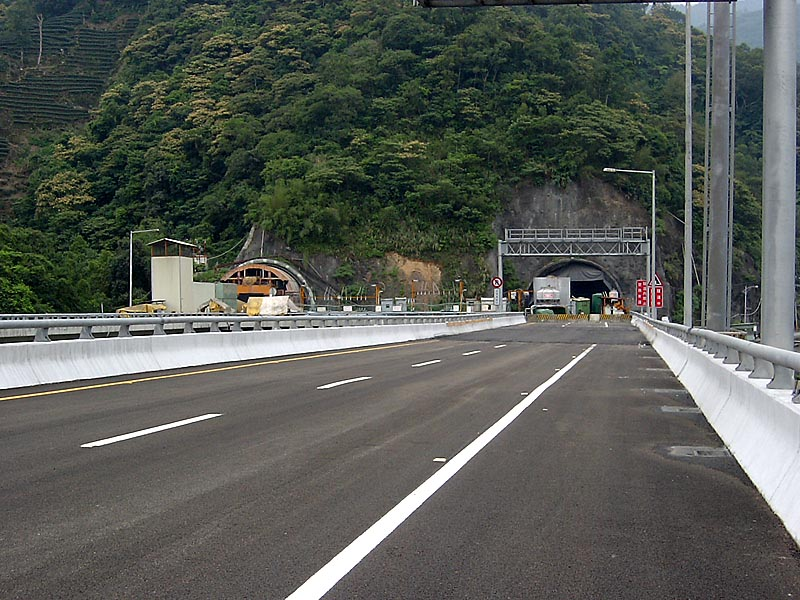
Xueshan Tunnel west entrance under construction in 2002.

== Tunnel information ==
- Tunnel length:
  - Pilot tunnel: 12,941 m (8.041 mi; 42,457.349 ft)
  - Main tunnels:
    - Southbound tunnel: 12,917 m (8.026 mi; 42,378.609 ft)
    - Northbound tunnel: 12,942 m (8.042 mi; 42,460.630 ft)
- Constructed by: RSEA
- Design speed: 70 km/h (Operational speed limit was raised to 90 km/h)
- Location: Pinglin District, New Taipei City and Toucheng Township, Yilan County
- Ventilation shaft: 3
- Total cost: NT$18,555,000,000 (US$562,273,000)
- Date of groundbreaking:
  - Pilot tunnel: July 1991
  - Main tunnels: July 23, 1993
- Date of breakthrough:
  - Pilot tunnel: October 2003
  - Main tunnels:
    - Southbound tunnel: September 2004
    - Northbound tunnel: April 2004
- Date of opening: June 16, 2006

== See also ==
- Xueshan
- Xueshan Range
