= Mount Dajian =

Mountain in Heping, Taichung, Taiwan

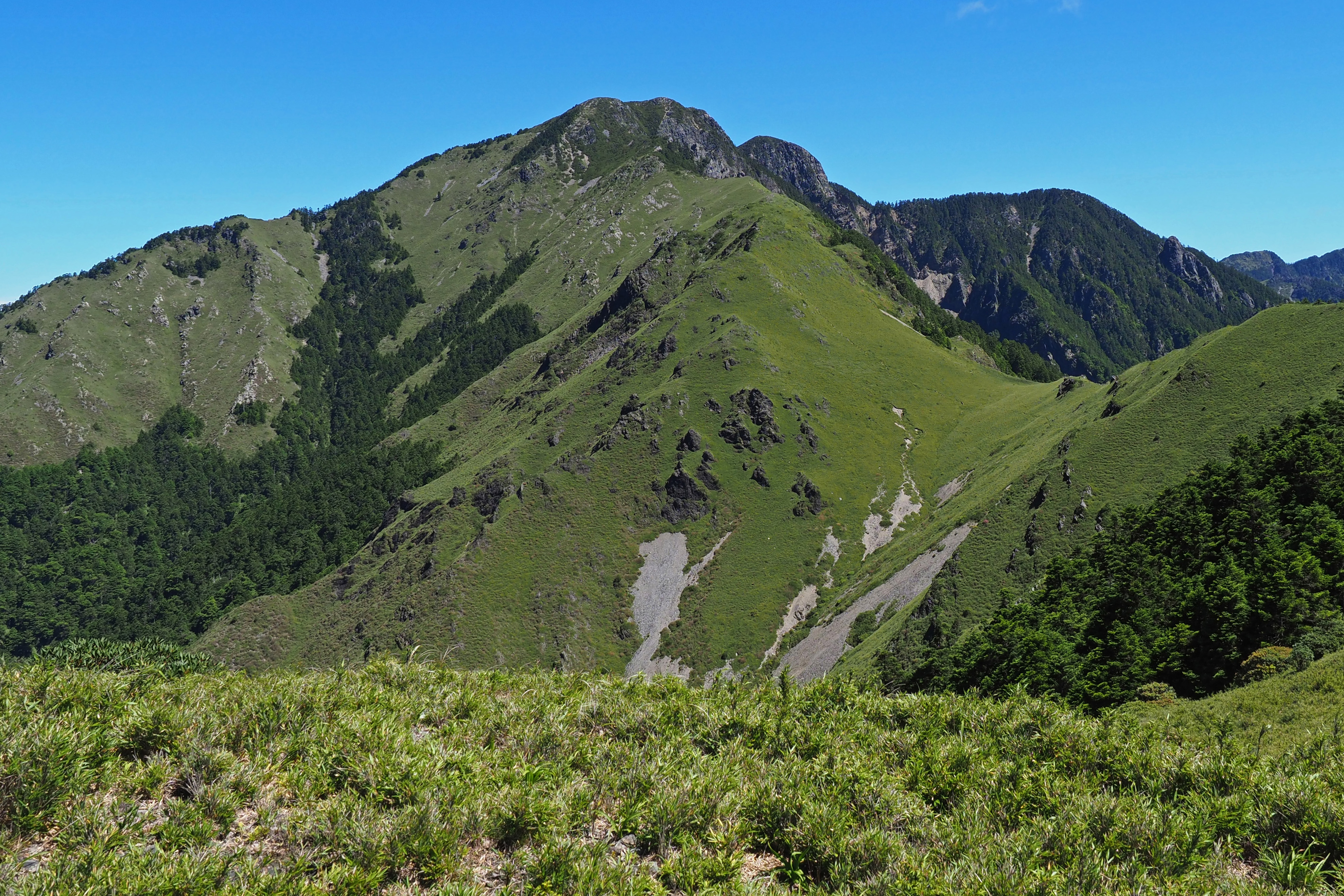

Highest point
- Elevation: 3,594 m (11,791 ft)
- Coordinates: 24°20′27″N 121°12′02″E

Naming
- Native name: 大劍山 (Chinese)

Geography
- Location within Taiwan
- Location: Heping, Taichung, Taiwan

Mount Dajian (Chinese: 大劍山; pinyin: Dàjiàn Shān) is a mountain in Heping District, Taichung, Taiwan with an elevation of 3,594 m (11,791 ft).

== See also ==
- List of mountains in Taiwan
