= Tung Hsiang-lung =

Taiwanese politician

- 董翔龍
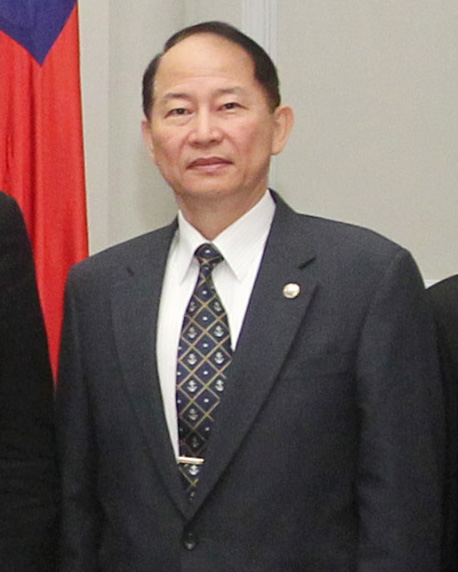

1st Minister of the Veterans Affairs Council of the Republic of China
- In office 1 November 2013 – 20 May 2016
- Preceded by: Position established
- Succeeded by: Lee Shying-jow

14th Minister of the Veterans Affairs Commission of the Executive Yuan of the Republic of China
- In office 1 August 2013 – 31 October 2013
- Preceded by: Tseng Jing-ling
- Succeeded by: Position abolished

4th Commander of the Republic of China Navy
- In office 16 May 2011 – 31 July 2013
- Preceded by: Kao Kuang-chi
- Succeeded by: Chen Yeong-kang

6th Commander of the Republic of China Combined Logistics Forces
- In office 1 November 2008 – 15 May 2011
- Preceded by: Kin Nai-chie
- Succeeded by: Wu Yo-ming

Personal details
- Born: 21 September 1952 (age 73) Chiayi City, Taiwan
- Education: Republic of China Naval Academy (BS); Naval War College (MS); Northwestern University (PhD)

Military service
- Allegiance: Republic of China
- Branch/service: Republic of China Navy
- Years of service: 1974–2013
- Rank: Admiral
- Battles/wars: Third Taiwan Strait Crisis

Tung Hsiang-lung (traditional Chinese: 董翔龍; simplified Chinese: 董翔龙; pinyin: Dǒng Xiánglóng; born 21 September 1952) is a Taiwanese computer scientist, military official, and retired admiral.

== Education ==
Tung graduated from the Republic of China Naval Academy in 1974. He then completed graduate studies in the United States, earning a Master of Science (M.S.) in computer science from the Naval War College in Newport, Rhode Island, and, in 1992, a Ph.D. in computer science from Northwestern University. His doctoral dissertation, completed under computer science professor Peter Scheuermann, was titled, "Deadlock detection and resolution in distributed database systems and multidatabase systems".

== Career ==
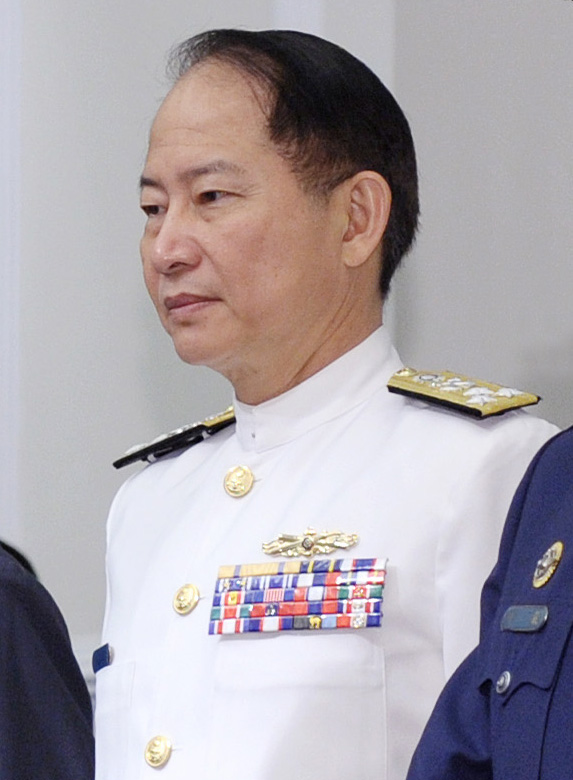
Admiral Tung

He was the commander of the ROCN from 16 May 2011 to 31 July 2013. He was also the Minister of the Veterans Affairs Council (VAC) from 1 August 2013 to 20 May 2016.

In early October 2013 during a legislative session, he said the VAC will stop issuing subsidies to ROC veterans that are found to hold PRC citizenship, citing the amendment to article 27 of the Act Governing Relations between the People of the Taiwan Area and the Mainland Area that was passed in March 2004. He added that the VAC had found a total of 12 veterans who currently reside in Mainland China and hold PRC nationality. However, if those 12 veterans give up their PRC nationality and apply to reinstate their ROC nationality in the future, they could again apply for the annual subsidy from the VAC.

Commenting on the vast number of retired ROC generals attending the 90th anniversary of Whampoa Military Academy, he said that there were a total of 3,000 retired ROC generals, and that the council had no authority to question the movement and schedule of every retired general since they are basically civilians after retiring from the ROC Armed Forces.

== Selected publications ==
- Park, Young-chul; P. Scheuermann; Hsiang-lung Tung. (1995). A Distributed Deadlock Detection and Resolution Algorithm Based on A Hybrid Wait-for Graph and Probe Generation Scheme. Conference: CIKM '95, Proceedings of the 1995 International Conference on Information and Knowledge Management, November 28 - December 2, 1995, Baltimore, Maryland, USA.
- Scheuermann, P.; Hsiang-Lung Tung. (1993). A recovery scheme for multidatabase systems. Conference on Information and Knowledge Management: Proceedings of the second international conference on Information and knowledge management; 01-05 Nov. 1993, 1993, p. 665-673.
- Scheuermann, P.; Hsiang-lung Tung. (1992). A deadlock checkpointing scheme for multidatabase systems. Research Issues on Data Engineering International Workshop (RIDE '92, 1992, p. 184-191).
- Hsiang-lung Tung. (1992). Deadlock detection and resolution in distributed database systems and multidatabase systems. Doctoral dissertation, Department of Electrical Engineering and Computer Science, McCormick School of Engineering, Northwestern University.
