= Dasyueshan National Forest Recreation Area =

Forest in Heping, Taichung, Taiwan

Dasyueshan National Forest Recreation Area Chinese: 大雪山國家森林遊樂區
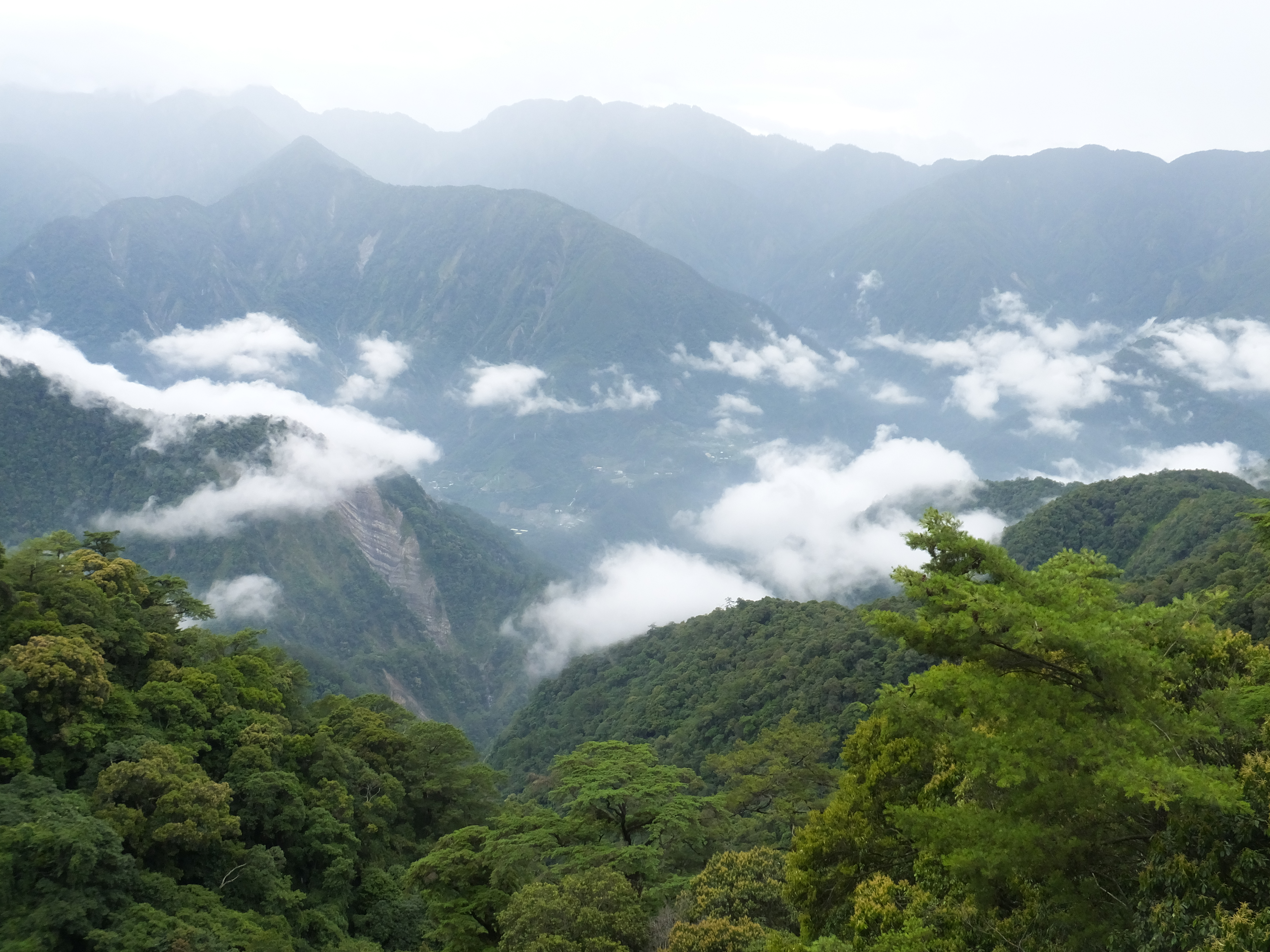

- Location within Taichung
- Interactive map of Dasyueshan National Forest Recreation Area

Geography
- Location: Heping, Taichung, Taiwan
- Coordinates: 24°14′41″N 120°58′30″E
- Elevation: 1,000–2,996 m (3,281–9,829 ft)
- Area: 3,963 ha (9,790 acres)

Administration
- Visitation: 200,000 (annually)

Dasyueshan National Forest Recreation Area (traditional Chinese: 大雪山國家森林遊樂區; simplified Chinese: 大雪山国家森林游乐区; pinyin: Dàxuěshān Guójiā Sēnlín Yóulè Qū) is a forest located in Heping District, Taichung, Taiwan.

== Geology ==
The forest spans over an area of 3,963 hectares and is located at an altitude of 1,000-2,996 meters above sea level. The mountains and recreational areas of the forest are located at an altitude of 2,000 meters. The mean temperature during summer is 18°C and during winter is -5°C.

== Tourism ==
The forest attracts 200,000 visitors every year.

== See also ==
- Geography of Taiwan
