= Xueshan Range =

Mountain range in Taiwan

Coordinates: 24°23′10″N 121°13′49″E

- Snow Mountain Range

Highest point
- Elevation: 3,886 m (12,749 ft)

Naming
- Native name: 雪山山脈 (Chinese)

Geography
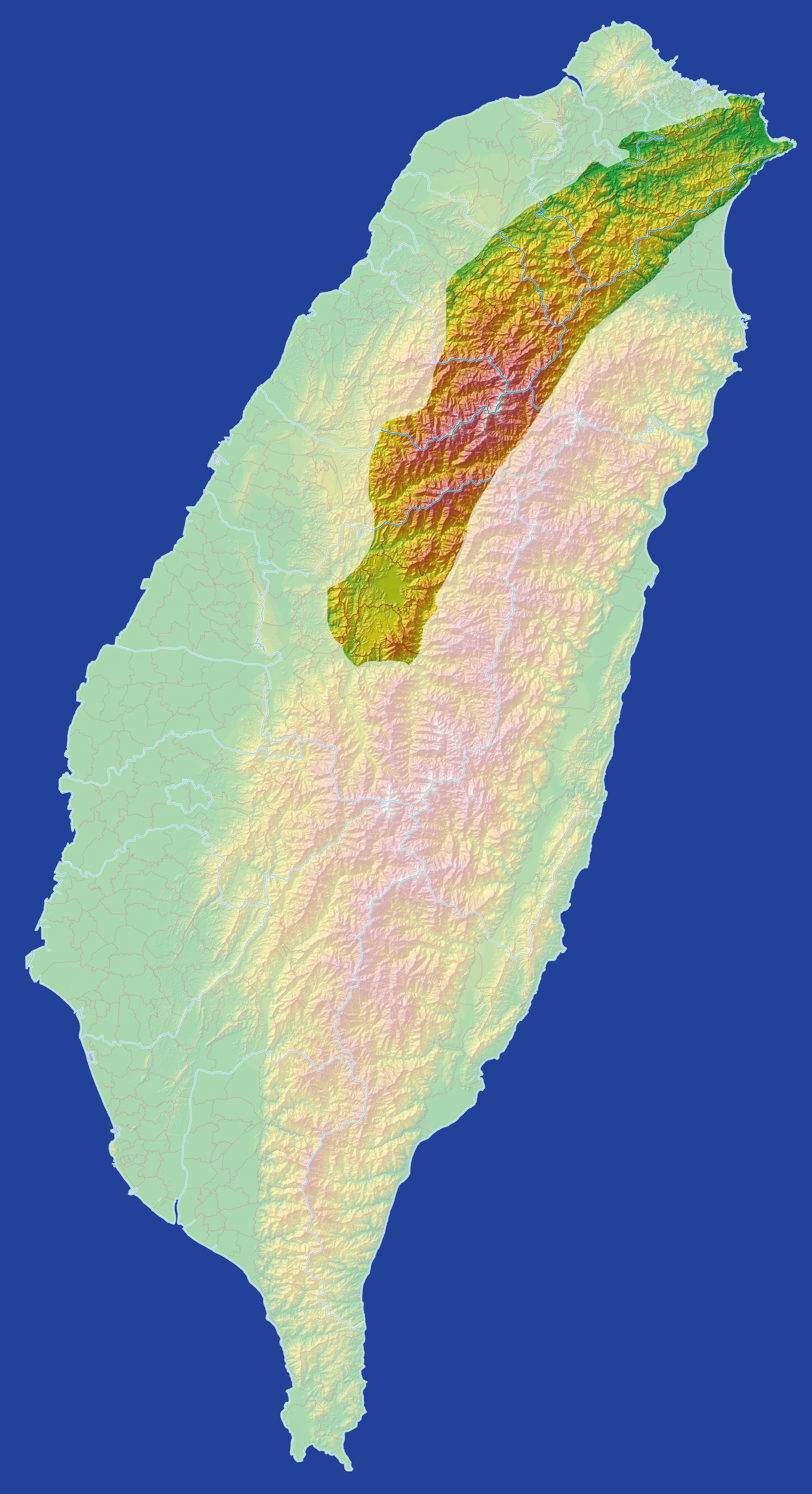
- Location: Taiwan

Geology
- Mountain type: Mountain range

Xueshan Range
- Traditional Chinese: 雪山山脈
- Simplified Chinese: 雪山山脉
- Literal meaning: Snowy Mountain Range
Transcriptions
Standard Mandarin
- Hanyu Pinyin: Xuěshān Shānmài; Xuěshān Shānmò
- Wade–Giles: Hsüeh-shan Shan-mai; Hsüeh-shan Shan-mo

The Xueshan Range is a mountain range in northern Taiwan. It is bordered by the Chungyang Range to the southeast. The tallest peak of the Xueshan Range is Xueshan/Sekuwan, which has a height of 3,886 m (12,749 ft). Shei-Pa National Park is located around the peaks of Xueshan and Dabajianshan.

== Names ==
The current name derives from the pinyin romanization of the Chinese name of the range's highest peak, Xueshan. The same name is sometimes written Hsüeh-shan or calqued as the Snow or Snowy Mountain Range. Under the Qing, the range was also known variously as the Middle, Western, Dodds, or the Mt Sylvia Range.

== List of peaks ==
There are 54 peaks taller than 3,000 m (9,843 ft) located in the Xueshan Range, 19 of which are numbered among the 100 Peaks of Taiwan:

- Xueshan Main Peak (雪山主峰), 3,886 m (12,749 ft)
- Xueshan Eastern Peak (雪山東峰), 3,201 m (10,502 ft)
- Xueshan Northern Peak (雪山北峰), 3,703 m (12,149 ft)
- Daxueshan (大雪山), 3,530 m (11,581 ft)
- Zhongxueshan (中雪山), 3,173 m (10,410 ft)
- Huoshishan (火石山), 3,310 m (10,860 ft)
- Touyingshan (頭鷹山), 3,510 m (11,516 ft)
- Zhijiayangdashan (志佳陽大山), 3,289 m (10,791 ft)
- Dabajianshan (大霸尖山), 3,490 m (11,450 ft)
- Xiaobajianshan (小霸尖山), 3,445 m (11,302 ft)
- Baigudashan (白姑大山), 3,342 m (10,965 ft)
- Yizeshan (伊澤山), 3,497 m (11,473 ft)
- Dajianshan (大劍山), 3,594 m (11,791 ft)
- Jianshan (劍山]), 3,253 m (10,673 ft)
- Jiayangshan (佳陽山), 3,314 m (10,873 ft)
- Pintianshan (品田山), 3,524 m (11,562 ft)
- Chiyoushan (池有山), 3,303 m (10,837 ft)
- Taoshan (桃山), 3,325 m (10,909 ft)
- Kalayeshan (喀拉業山), 3,133 m (10,279 ft)

== See also ==
- Hsuehshan Tunnel
