= Veterans Affairs Council =

Government commission in charge of veterans affairs in Taiwan

- 國軍退除役官兵輔導委員會

Agency overview
- Formed: 1 November 1954 (as Vocational Assistance Commission for Retired Servicemen); 1 November 2013 (as VAC)
- Jurisdiction: Republic of China (Taiwan)
- Headquarters: Xinyi, Taipei
- Ministers responsible: Yen Teh-fa, Minister; Liu Shu-lin, Lee Wen-chung, Ching Hsiao-hui, Deputy Minister
- Parent agency: Executive Yuan
- Website: vac.gov.tw

Veterans Affairs Council
- Traditional Chinese: 國軍退除役官兵輔導委員會
Transcriptions
Standard Mandarin
- Hanyu Pinyin: Guójūn Tuìchúyì Guānbīng Fǔdǎo Wěiyuánhuì
Hakka
- Romanization: Koet-kiûn Thui-chhù-yi̍t Kôn-pîn Phú-thô Vî-yèn-fi
Southern Min
- Hokkien POJ: Kok-kun Thè-tû-ia̍h Koaⁿ-peng Hù-tō Úi-oân-hōe

The Veterans Affairs Council (VAC; 國軍退除役官兵輔導委員會) is a branch of the Executive Yuan of the Republic of China (Taiwan) with "responsibilities to assist in education assistance, employment assistance, medical care, home care and other general services" for retired servicemen and women from the Republic of China Armed Forces. VAC is a National Member of World Veterans Federation.

The incumbent minister is Feng Shih-kuan, a retired Republic of China Air Force general who took office on 5 August 2019.

== History ==
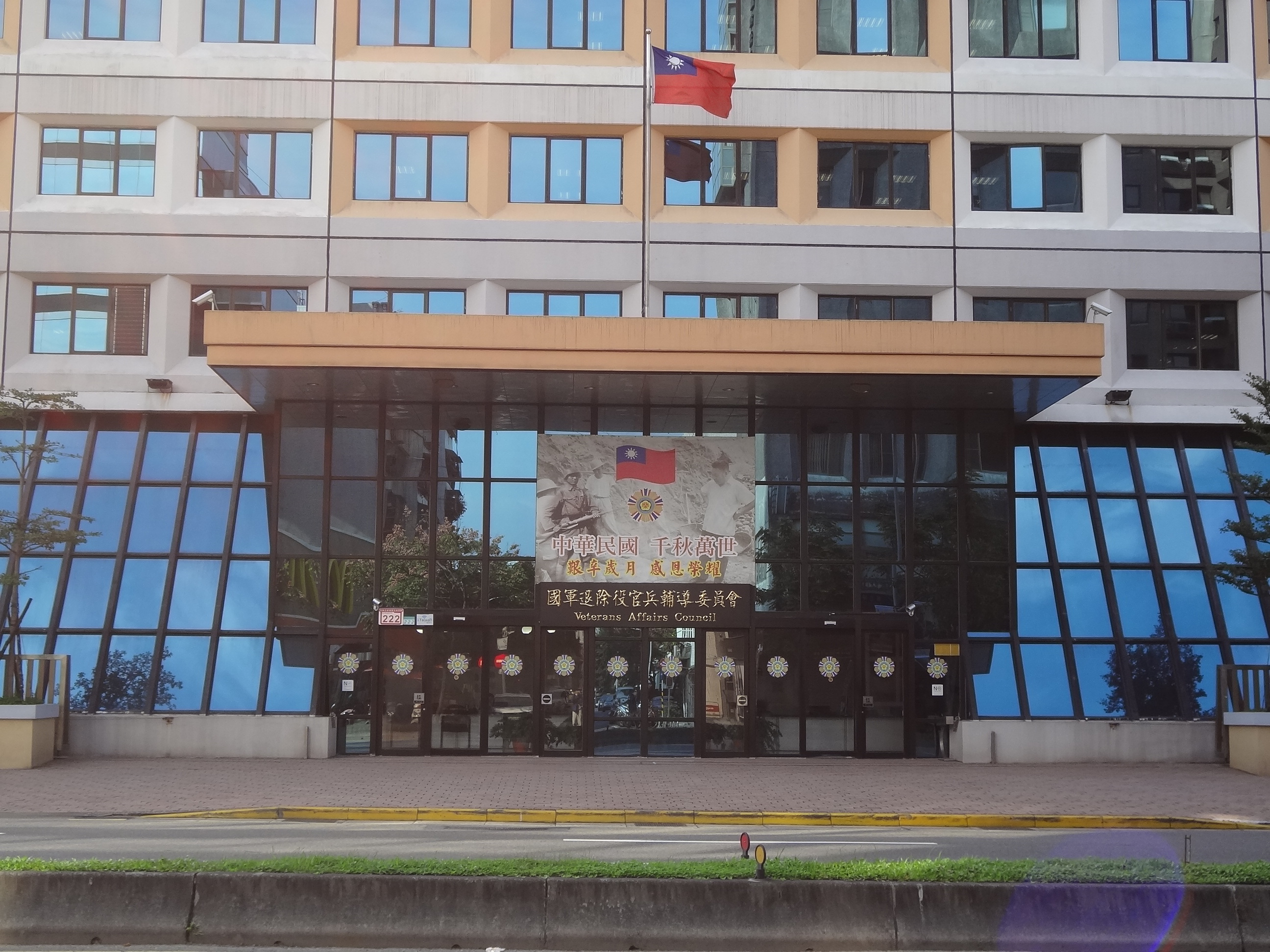
Front gate of the Veterans Affairs Council building

VAC was founded as cabinet-level organization on 1 November 1954 as Vocational Assistance Commission for Retired Servicemen (VACRS; Chinese: 國軍退除役官兵就業輔導委員會; pinyin: Guójūn Tuìchúyì Guānbīng Jiùyè Fǔdǎo Wěiyuánhuì). It changed name to Veterans Affairs Commission in 1966 and to Veterans Affairs Council on 1 November 2013.

== Missions and functions ==
- Ensuring the Vitality of the Armed Forces
- Securing Social Stability and Prosperity
- Maximizing Human Resources
- Supporting National Reconstruction
- Developing Substantive Diplomacy

== Organizational structures ==
- Department of Planning
- Department of Veterans Service and Assistance
- Department of Homecare and Nursing Care
- Department of Education and Employment Assistance
- Department of Healthcare and Medical Care
- Department of Business Management
- Department of Retirement Payment
- Department of Administrative Management
- Department of Personnel
- Department of Civil Service Ethics
- Department of Accounting
- Department of Statistics and Information
- Legal Affairs Committee

== Hospitals and Veterans Homes ==
VAC operates hospitals and retirement homes, including:

- Taipei Veterans General Hospital
- Kaohsiung Veterans General Hospital

== Associated Enterprises ==
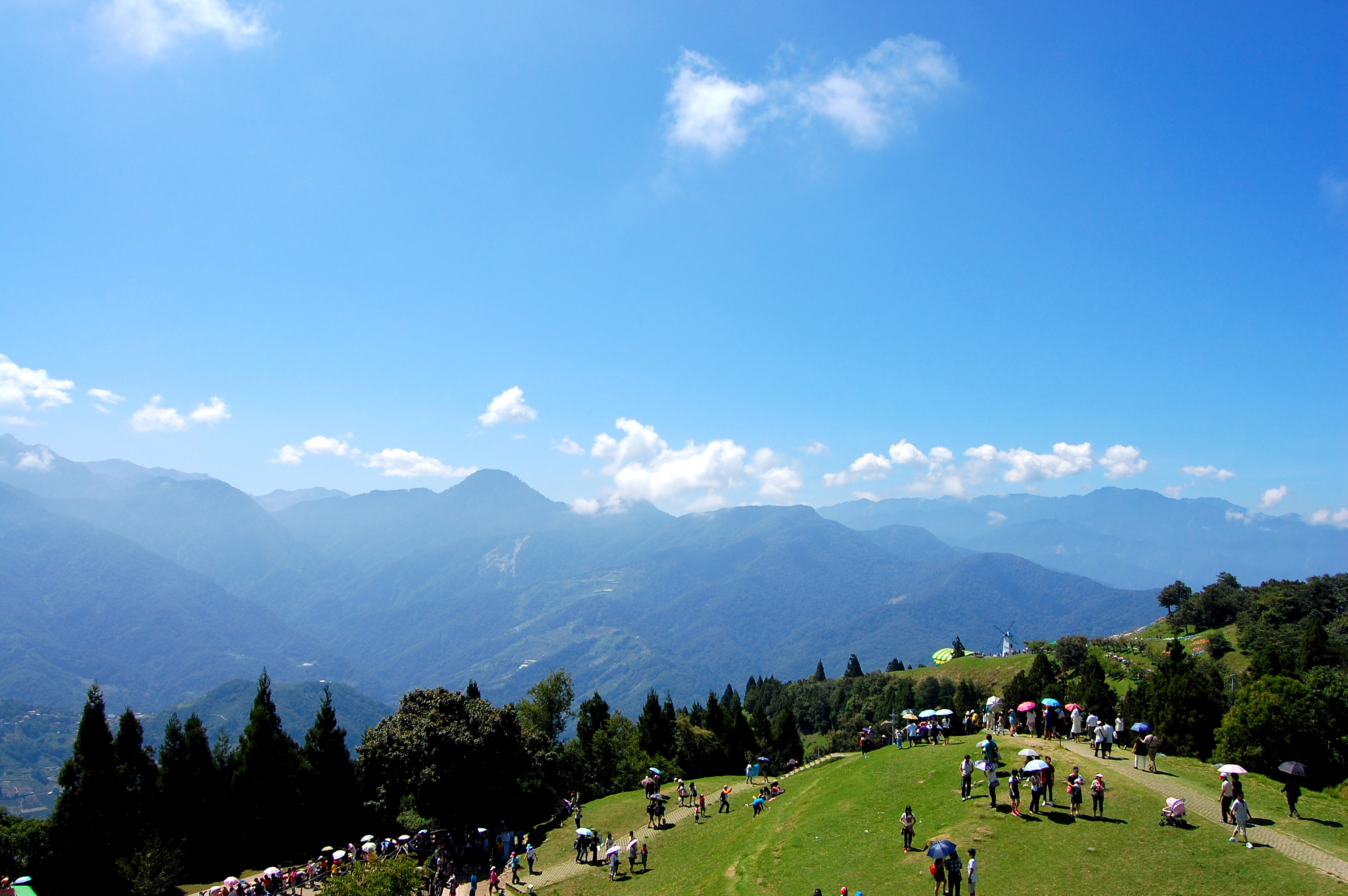
Cingjing Farm

Under its charter to provide employment assistance to Taiwan (ROC) military veterans, the Veterans Affairs Commission operates a number of for profit enterprises in Taiwan that employ veterans. Some of the related businesses include:

- Shin-Shin Bus Company (欣欣客運)
- Danan Bus Company (大南汽車)
- Wuling Farm
- Fushoushan Farm
- Cingjing Farm
- RSEA Engineering (榮民工程公司) – As on 1 July 1998 no longer associated with the Veterans Affairs Commission.

== List of VAC Ministers ==
Political parties: Kuomintang Democratic Progressive Party Non-partisan/ unknown

For ministers who retired from the Armed Forces to serve, the Service column denotes their military branch before retirement.

#	Name	Term of Office		Days	Party	Service branch	Cabinet
Minister of the Vocational Assistance Commission for Retired Servicemen
1	Yen Chia-kan 嚴家淦	1 November 1954	24 April 1956	541	Kuomintang	Civilian	Yu Hung-chun
2	Chiang Ching-kuo 蔣經國	25 April 1956	30 June 1964	2989	Kuomintang	Republic of China Army General	Yu Hung-chun; Chen Cheng II; Yen Chia-kan
Minister of the Veterans Affairs Commission (since 1966)
1	Chao Tsu-yu 趙聚鈺	1 July 1964	7 June 1981	6185	Kuomintang	Republic of China Army	Yen Chia-kan; Chiang Ching-kuo; Sun Yun-suan
2	Cheng Wei-yuan 鄭為元	18 June 1981	28 April 1987	2141	Kuomintang	Republic of China Army General	Sun Yun-suan; Yu Kuo-hua
3	Chang Kuo-ying 張國英	29 April 1987	17 November 1987	203	Kuomintang	Republic of China Army General	Yu Kuo-hua
4	Hsu Li-nung 許歷農	18 November 1987	26 February 1993	1928	Kuomintang	Republic of China Army General	Yu Kuo-hua; Lee Huan; Hau Pei-tsun
5	Chou Shih-pin 周世斌	27 February 1993	14 December 1994	656	Kuomintang	Republic of China Army Lieutenant General	Lien Chan
6	Yang Ting-yun 楊亭雲	15 December 1994	31 January 1999	1509	Kuomintang	Republic of China Army General	Lien Chan; Vincent Siew
7	Lee Cheng-lin 李楨林	1 February 1999	19 May 2000	474	Kuomintang	Republic of China Army General	Vincent Siew
8	Yang Te-chih 楊德智	20 May 2000	5 February 2003	992	Kuomintang	Republic of China Army General	Tang Fei; Chang Chun-hsiung I Yu Shyi-kun
9	Teng Tsu-lin 鄧祖琳	6 February 2003	19 May 2004	469	Kuomintang	Republic of China Army General	Yu Shyi-kun
10	Kao Hua-chu 高華柱	20 May 2004	31 January 2007	987	Kuomintang	Republic of China Army General	Yu Shyi-kun; Frank Hsieh; Su Tseng-chang I
11	Hu Chen-pu 胡鎮埔	1 February 2007	19 May 2008	474	Kuomintang	Republic of China Army General	Su Tseng-chang I Chang Chun-hsiung II
12	Kao Hua-chu 高華柱	20 May 2008	9 September 2009	478	Kuomintang	Republic of China Army General	Liu Chao-shiuan
13	Tseng Jing-ling 曾金陵	10 September 2009	31 July 2013	1421	Kuomintang	Republic of China Army General	Wu Den-yih; Sean Chen; Jiang Yi-huah
Minister of the Veterans Affairs Council (since 1 November 2013)
1	Tung Hsiang-lung 董翔龍	1 August 2013	19 May 2016	1023	Kuomintang	Republic of China Navy Admiral	Jiang Yi-huah; Mao Chi-kuo; Chang San-cheng
2	Lee Hsiang-chou 李翔宙	20 May 2016	25 February 2018	647	Kuomintang	Republic of China Army General	Lin Chuan; William Lai
3	Chiu Kuo-cheng 邱國正	26 February 2018	25 July 2019	515	Independent	Republic of China Army General	William Lai; Su Tseng-chang II
—	Lee Wen-chung 李文忠	26 July 2019	4 August 2019	10	Democratic Progressive Party	Civilian	Su Tseng-chang II
4	Feng Shih-kuan 馮世寬	5 August 2019	20 May 2024	1750	Independent	Republic of China Air Force General	Su Tseng-chang II; Chen Chien-jen
5	Yen Teh-fa 嚴德發	20 May 2024	Incumbent	815	Independent	Republic of China Army General	Cho Jung-tai

== See also ==
- Republic of China Armed Forces
- Rongmin
