= Heping District, Taichung =

Mountain indigenous district in Taichung, Taiwan

Heping 和平區
- Mountain Indigenous District
- Heping District
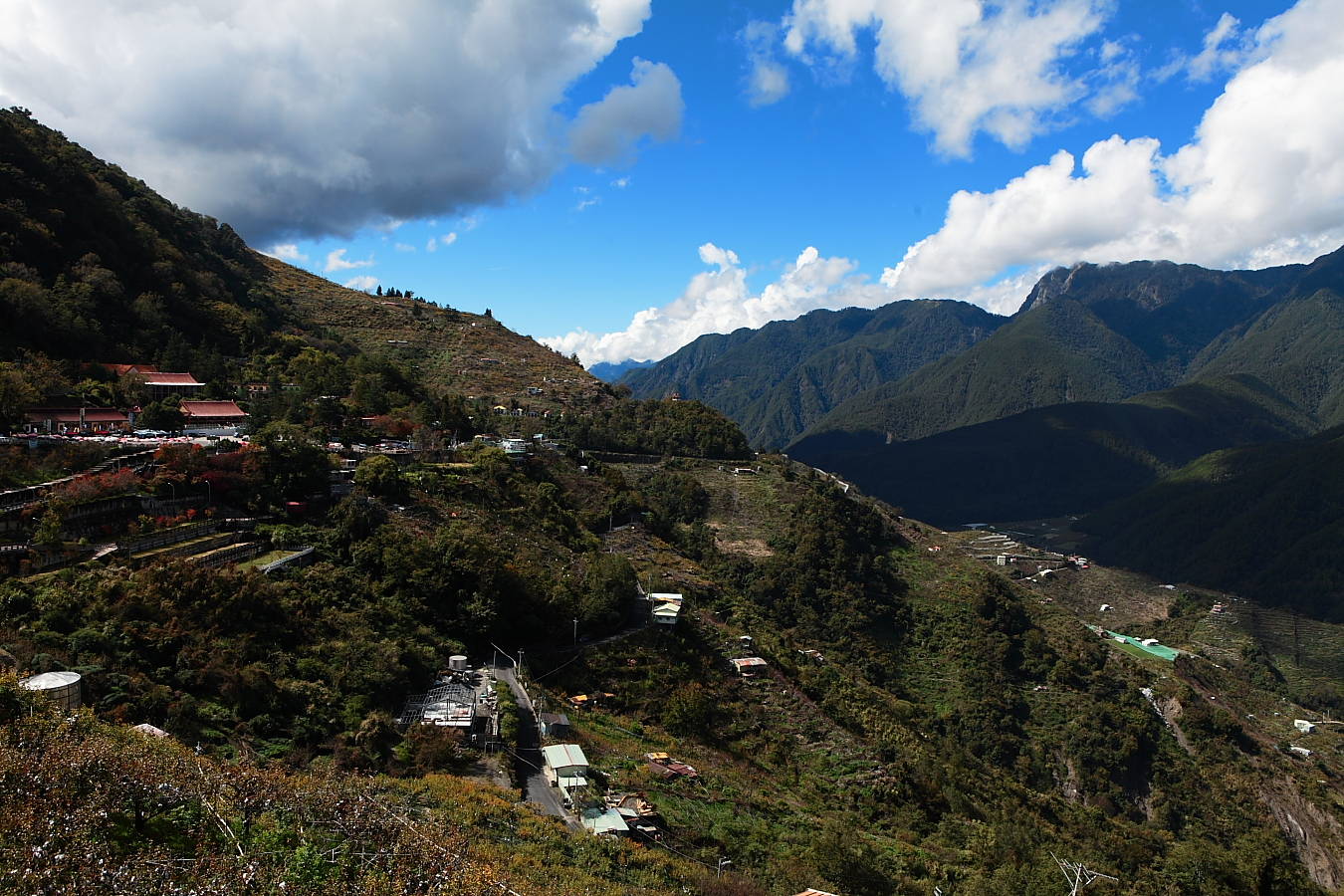

- Heping District in Taichung City
- Coordinates: 24°16′00″N 121°09′00″E
- Country: Taiwan
- Special municipality: Taichung
- Boroughs: List: 8 villages

Government
  - Type: District government
  - District chief: Lin Jian-tang (KMT)

Area
  - Land: 1,037.82 km^{2} (400.70 sq mi)

Population (February 2023)
  - Total: 10,889
  - Density: 10.492/km^{2} (27.175/sq mi)
- Website: www.heping.taichung.gov.tw (in Chinese)

Heping District (Chinese: 和平區; pinyin: Hépíng Qū; Wade–Giles: Ho^{2}-p'ing^{2} Ch'ü^{1}) is a mountain indigenous district in eastern Taichung, Taiwan, and it is the largest district of Taichung City. It is also the largest district in Taiwan by area. It is the center of population of Taiwan.

== History ==
After the handover of Taiwan from Japan to the Republic of China in 1945, Heping was organized as a Mountain indigenous township of Taichung County. On 7 June 1973, two northeast most villages of the township were separated to form a new county-level division, which was Lishan Constructing Administrative Bureau (Chinese: 梨山建設管理局). However, the bureau was dissolved on 18 February 1982 and the two villages were returned to the township. On 25 December 2010, Taichung County was merged with Taichung City and Heping was upgraded to a district of the city.

== Geography ==
The district covers an area of 1,037.82 square kilometres (400.70 sq mi), making it the largest district in Taichung as well as in Taiwan.

== Demographics ==
As of February 2023, the district comprises 10,889 residents, of which around 4,000 are Atayal people.

== Economy ==
Native products of Heping District are apple, honey, vegetable, mountain fish, peach and bamboo.

== Administrative divisions ==
Nanshi, Tianlun, Boai, Ziyou, Daguan, Zhongkeng, Lishan and Pingdeng Village.

== Infrastructure ==
- Kukuan Dam
- Ma'an Dam
- Qingshan Dam
- Techi Dam
- Tienlun Dam
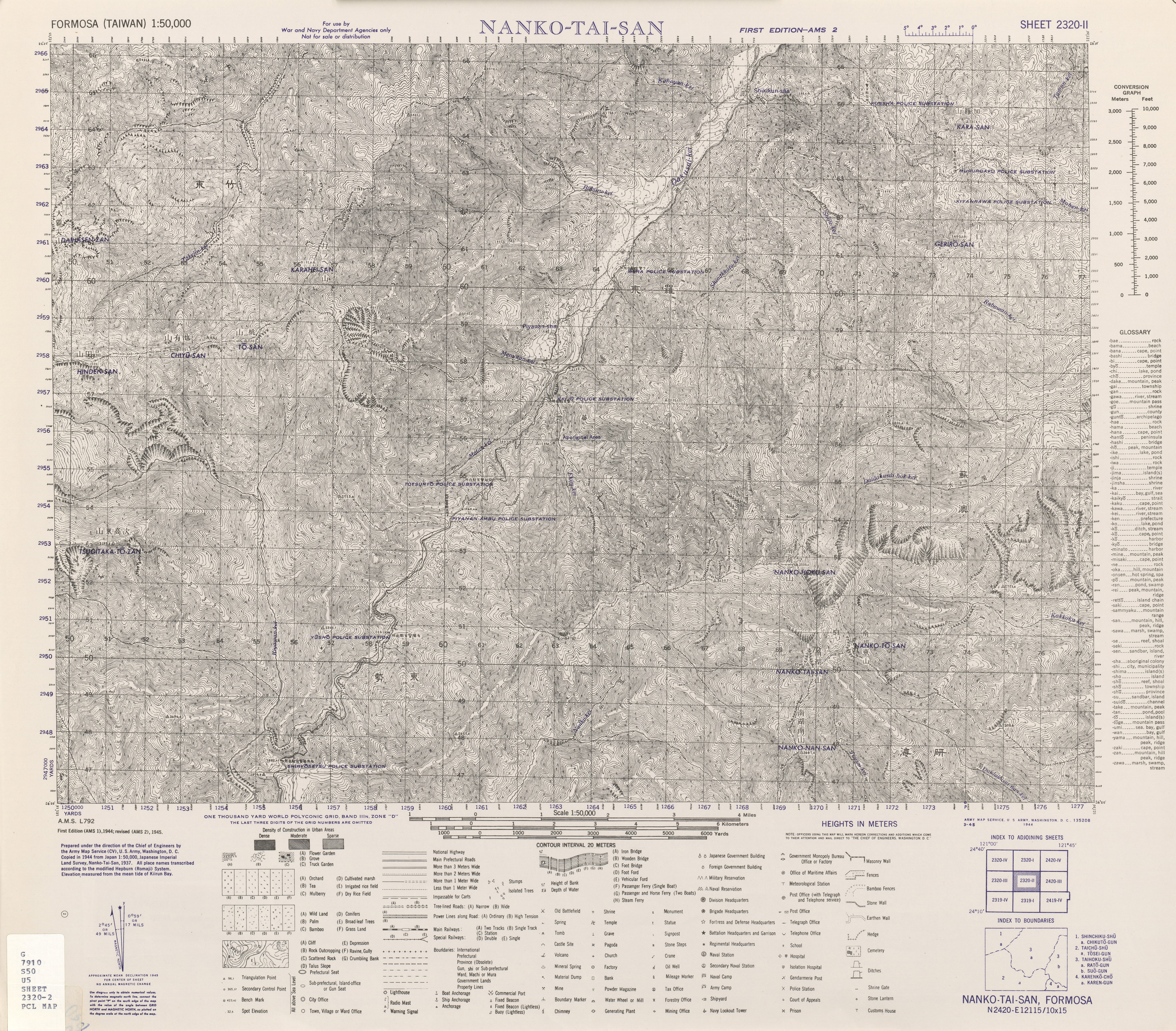
  Map of eastern Heping area (1944)

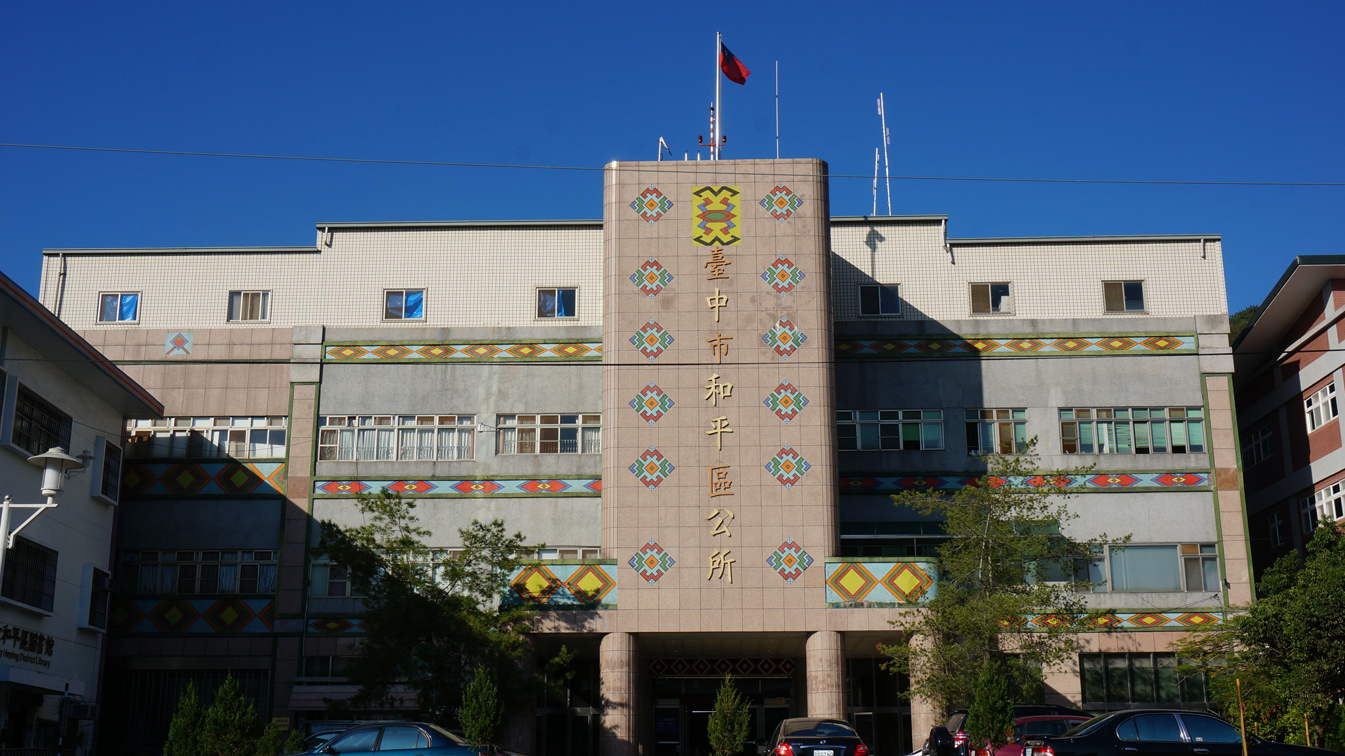
Heping District office

== Tourist attractions ==
- Baigu Mountain
- Basianshan National Forest Recreation Area
- Dajian Mountain
- Dajia River
- Dasyueshan National Forest Recreation Area
- Eight Immortals Mountain
- Fushoushan Farm
- Guguan Hot Spring
- Lishan Culture Museum
- Mount Nanhu
- Mount Xue
- Wuling Farm
- Fushoushan Farm
- Wuling National Forest Recreation Area

== Transportation ==
The Provincial Highway 8 passes through Heping District to the east side of the island. On 21 September 1999, the 921 earthquake caused severe damage to the road, and is unlikely to be repaired. The section east of Guguan is now permanently closed to non-residents. Provincial Highway No. 14A now serves as an alternate route.

== Notable natives ==
- Kao Chin Su-mei, member of Legislative Yuan

== See also ==
- Taichung
