= Wuling Farm =

Farm in Heping, Taichung, Taiwan

Wuling Farm 武陵農場
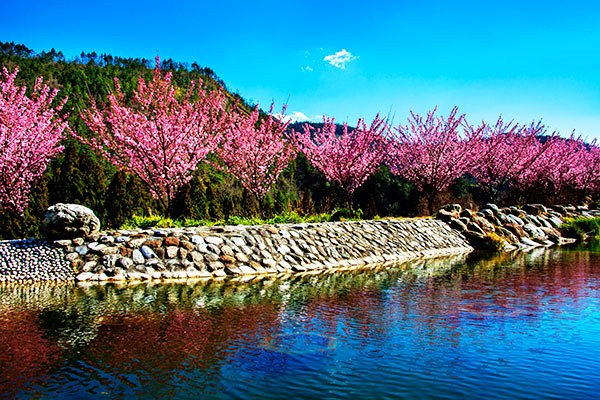
- Cherry blossoms at Wuling Farm in spring
- Interactive map of Wuling Farm 武陵農場
- Town/City: Heping, Taichung, Taiwan
- Coordinates: 24°20′44.8″N 121°18′29.9″E
- Established: 1963
- Owner: Veterans Affairs Council
- Area: 700 ha (1,700 acres)

Wuling Farm (traditional Chinese: 武陵農場; simplified Chinese: 武陵农场; pinyin: Wǔlíng Nóngchǎng; Pe̍h-ōe-jī: Bú-lêng Lông-tiûⁿ) is a tourist attraction farm in Heping District, Taichung, Taiwan. Located at an altitude of 1,750~2,200 meters (4750 to 7200 feet), it's known as one of the three major high mountain farms in Taiwan, besides Qingjing Farm and Fushoushan Farm.

== History ==
The farm was established in 1963 to provide employment for retired servicemen. At the beginning of the reclamation phase, the first director of the farm led veterans in opening up land to cultivate summer highland vegetables and temperate fruit trees. He then accepted the counsel of the Agricultural Revival Development Committee in setting the farm's management policy. In 1967, the land started to be developed by reforming land, planting fruit trees and setting up the vegetable planning. The farming area was also expanded and mechanical operation methods to effectively boost the efficiency and save on manpower were also developed. In 1986, the first phase of transformation was completed. Since 1989, the farm started to gradually develop facilities, such as camping grounds, garden, tea houses, hostels and tourist service center. After completion, the farm worked together with the Veterans Farm Committee in obtaining subsidies from the Tourism Bureau in order to expand its facilities over the coming few years. Since 1999, the farm started to implement its second phase of transformation, starting from the construction of its second hostel and outsourced its management team. It expanded and renovated its facilities on its garden, park, camping grounds, tea, electrical system and botanical garden.

== Geology ==
The farm spans over 700 hectares (2¾ sq. mi.) of area located at an altitude of 1,750~2,200 meters (4750 to 7200 feet) in Shei-Pa National Park. It consists of flowers, fish farming, fruit plantation, vegetables and high mountain tea.

== Facilities ==
The farm is equipped with camping ground, trails and garden.

== Transportation ==
The farm is accessible by bus from Yilan Station, Fengyuan Station or Taipei Railway Station.

== See also ==
- List of tourist attractions in Taiwan
