= Yin Zongwen =

Republic of ChinaOffice of the President (Taiwan)
- In office May 20, 2000 – May 19, 2002
- President: Chen Shui-bian

Republic of China3rd termNational Security Council (Taiwan) Secretary General
- In office February 1, 1999 – May 19, 2000
- Preceded by: Ting Mao-shih
- Succeeded by: Chuang Ming-yao

National Security Bureau (Taiwan) The 8th Director
- In office 1993年8月1日–1999年1月31日
- President: Lee Teng-hui
- Preceded by: Song Xinlian
- Succeeded by: Ding Yuzhou

The 20th Commander-in-Chief of the Army Penghu Defense Command of the Republic of China
- In office 1987–1989
- Preceded by: Mao Mengyi
- Succeeded by: Luo Jiyuan

Personal details
- Political party: Kuomintang

Military service
- Allegiance: Republic of China
- Branch/service: ROCA
- Rank: Military star ranking

Yin Zongwen (June 2, 1932 - March 28, 2003) was a military general and political figure of the Republic of China. He served as Assistant Undersecretary of the Joint Third Joint Staff (military), Commander of the Army Pengdong Defense Department, and Director of Military Intelligence Bureau of the Ministry of National Defense.

After retiring, he served as Counselor of the Presidential Office of the Republic of China. During Lee Teng-hui's administration, he served as director of national security and secretary-general of the National Security Council. During the 1996 Taiwan Strait crisis and the two presidential elections in 1996 and 2000, he helped stabilize the country and society.

== Early life ==
He was born in Donghai County, Jiangsu Province. He graduated from Donghai Normal University in 1947 and was admitted to Nanjing No. 1 Middle School. He graduated from the 25th class of the Army Officer School. He was sent to the West German Army Staff University to receive military education and training.

== Career ==
After returning to China in 1970, he was promoted to lieutenant colonel and battalion commander. He graduated from the 65th class of the War College of the Armed Services University and was promoted to colonel. He served as brigade commander, division commander, assistant undersecretary for operations of the Ministry of National Defense, chief of staff of the corps, and commander of the Ministry of Defense.

In 1989, Yin Zongwen took the position of Director of Military Intelligence and devoted himself to the field of national security and intelligence management.

In 1993, when he was about to retire at the age of 60, President Lee Teng-hui appointed him as deputy director of the National Security Bureau of the Republic of China, assisting director Song Xinlian. In August of the same year, he was promoted to director of national security. In 1999, he became Secretary-General of the National Security Council.

He died of lung adenocarcinoma in Taipei Veterans General Hospital on March 28, 2003.

== Recognition ==
=== Medal of the Order of the Republic of China ===
- Order of the Cloud and Banner (Awarded at the Presidential Palace in Taipei on February 1, 1999)
- Order of Brilliant Star (Awarded at the Presidential Office in Taipei on May 16, 2000)
