= Taiwan Cultural Center (Tokyo) =

Cultural center in Minato, Tokyo, Japan

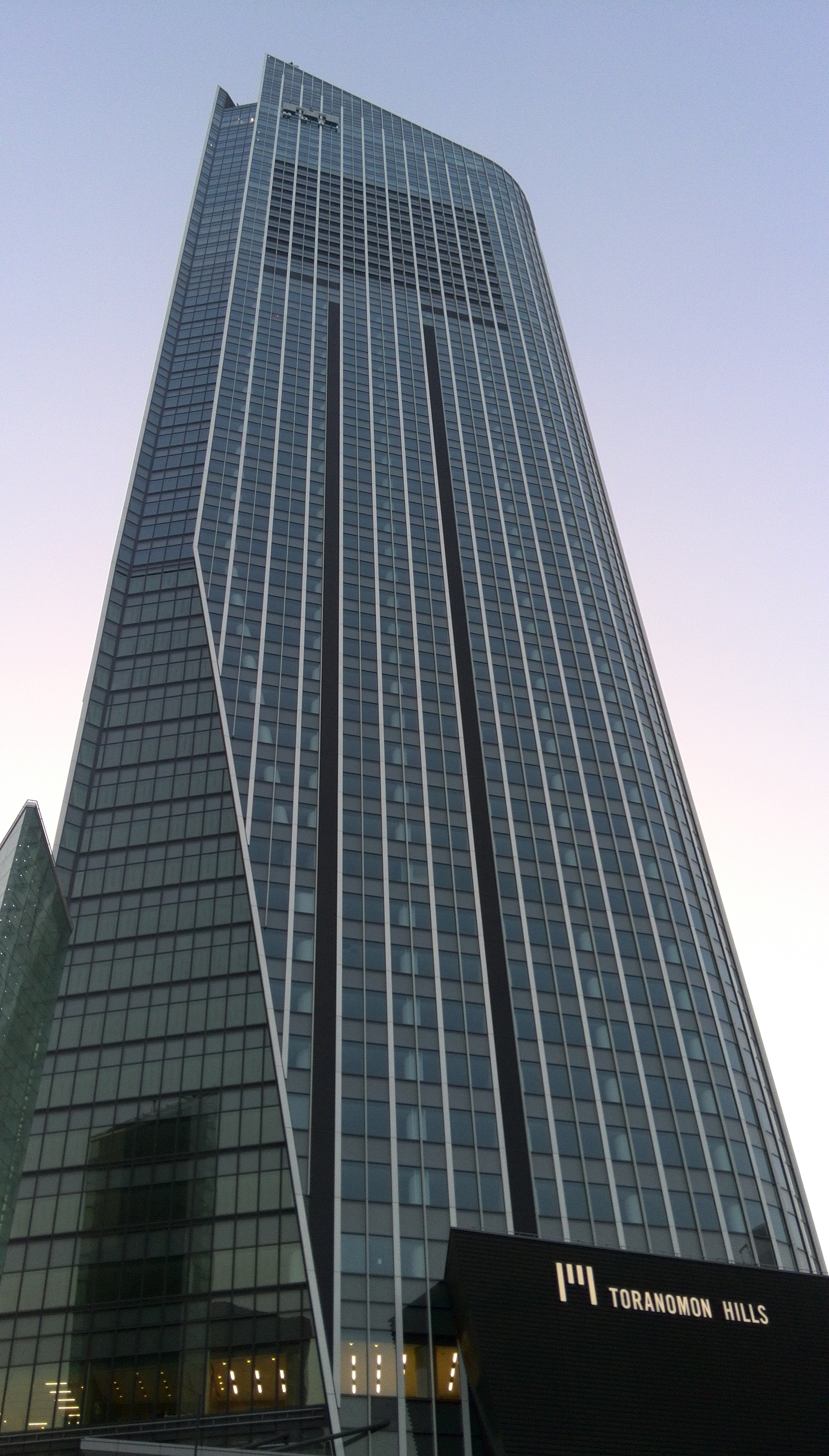
- Interactive map of Taiwan Cultural Center
- Location: Toranomon, Minato, Tokyo, Japan
- Coordinates: 35°40′00.5″N 139°44′58.2″E
- Type: Cultural center

Construction
- Opened: 21 April 2010 (first location); 12 June 2015 (current location)

The Taiwan Cultural Center is a cultural center in Toranomon, Minato, Tokyo, Japan about Taiwan, located at Toranomon Hills building.

== History ==
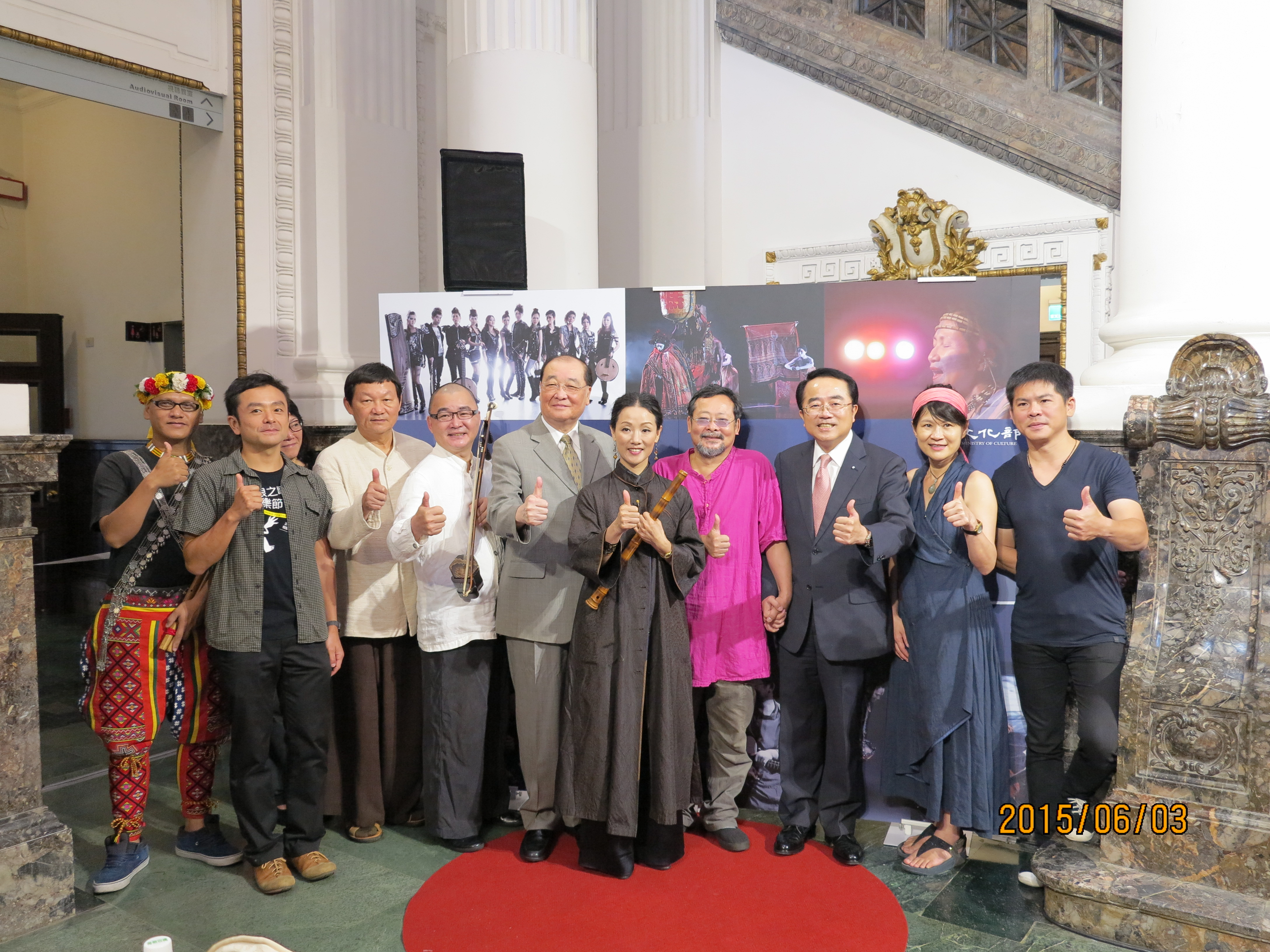
The press conference at Taipei Economic and Cultural Representative Office in Japan for the opening of Taiwan Cultural Center in 2015.

The cultural center was originally opened as Taipei Cultural Center on 21 April 2010 at Taipei Economic and Cultural Representative Office in Japan. On 12 June 2015, the relocation and opening ceremony was held to welcome the center in its new location at Toranomon Hills building as Taiwan Cultural Center. Speaking during the ceremony, Culture Minister Hung Meng-chi hoped that the new center will attract more Japanese to know Taiwan.

== Transportation ==
The center is accessible within walking distance south of Toranomon Station of Tokyo Metro.

== See also ==
- Japan–Taiwan relations
- Taiwan under Japanese rule
