= Taiwanese-Japanese =

Taiwanese-Japanese or Japanese-Taiwanese can refer to:

- Japan–Taiwan relations
- Japanese invasion of Taiwan (1895)
- Japanese invasion of Taiwan (1874)
- Taiwan under Japanese rule
- Taiwanese people § Taiwanese Japanese
