= Su Chii-cherng =

Taiwanese diplomat (1957–2018)

- 蘇啟誠
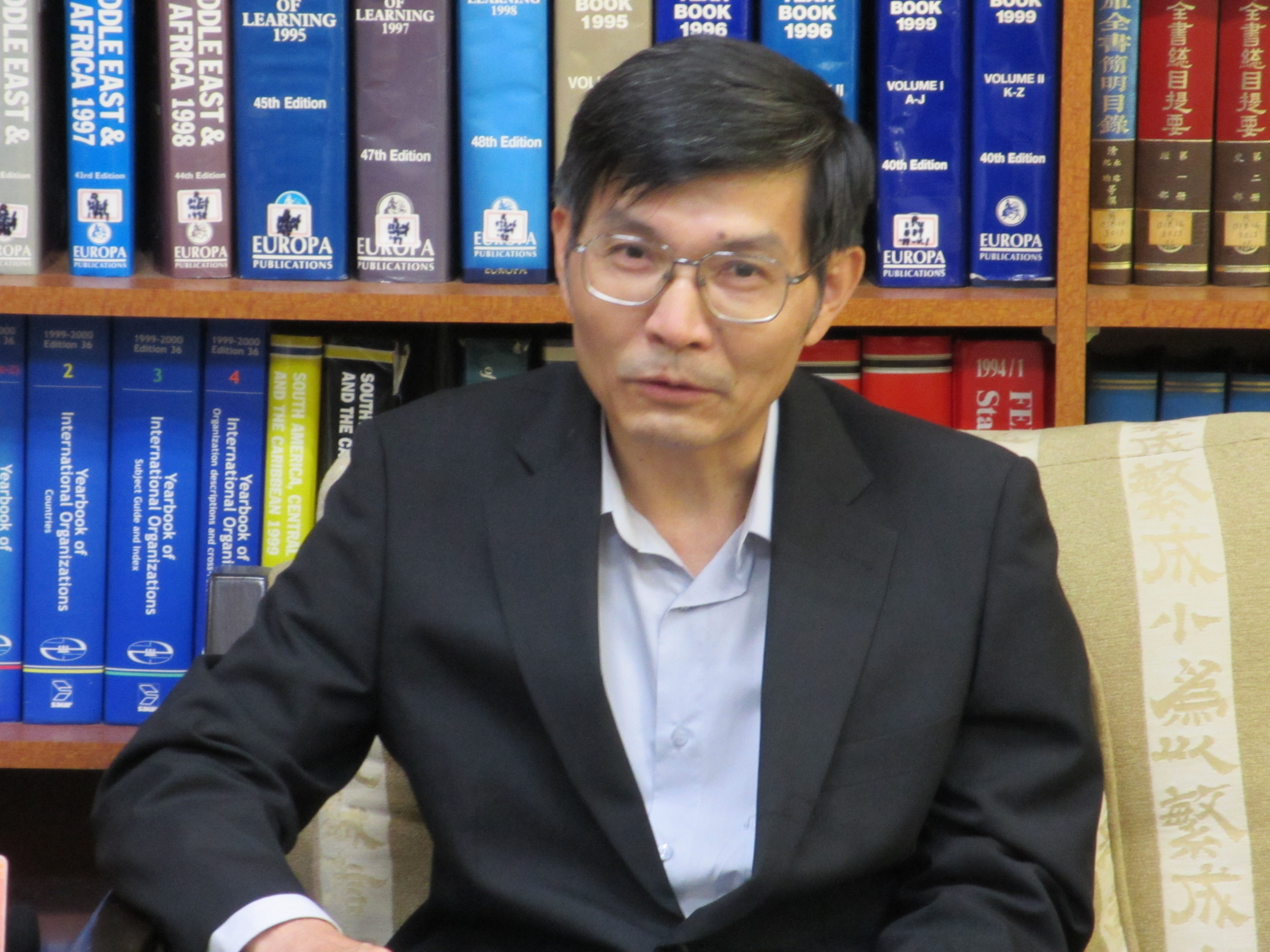

Director of the Taipei Economic and Cultural Office in Osaka
- In office July 8, 2018 – September 14, 2018
- Succeeded by: Zhang Renjiu (acting)

Personal details
- Born: August 1, 1957 Zhuqi Township, Chiayi County, Taiwan
- Died: September 14, 2018 (aged 61) Toyonaka, Japan
- Cause of death: Suicide by hanging
- Education: Soochow University; Chinese Culture University; Osaka University
- Profession: Diplomat

Su Chii-cherng (Chinese: 蘇啟誠; pinyin: Sū Qǐchéng; August 1, 1957 – September 14, 2018) was a Taiwanese diplomat who notably worked for the Taipei Economic and Cultural Office (TECO), Taiwan's de facto embassy in countries which have recognised the Chinese government. He took over as the director of TECO's branch in Osaka on July 8, 2018. On September 14 of the same year, he committed suicide by hanging in his home in Toyonaka at the age of 61, allegedly in response to criticism of the office's response to Typhoon Jebi amplified by pro-China disinformation.

== Life and career ==
Su Chii-cherng was born in Zhuqi Township, Chiayi County. In June 1979, he graduated from Soochow University with a bachelor's degree from the Department of Japanese Language and Literature. In June 1981, he received a master's degree from the Graduate Institute of Japanese Language and Literature at the Chinese Culture University. In 1985, he went to Japan to study at the Graduate School of Japanese Language and Literature at Osaka University, and was awarded a second master's degree there in April 1988.

Su began working for the Ministry of Foreign Affairs beginning in 1991. In 1995, he became the Third Secretary of TECO in Japan. In 2007, He also previously served as the deputy secretary-general at TECO, and in 2011 worked as deputy director-general of the Department of Asia, East and Pacific Affairs within the ministry. In December 2013, he moved to Naha City in the Okinawa Prefecture of Japan to serve as director of the Naha Branch of TECO.

In March 2018, Su Qicheng visited Ishigaki Island and briefly described the history of Taiwanese immigration to the island. While serving in Naha, he regularly contributed articles to Japanese media in four and a half years, publishing 40 articles speaking out for Taiwan and promoting exchanges between Taiwan and Japan. Su transferred to the Osaka branch to serve as its director on July 8, 2018.

== Suicide ==
On September 4, 2018, Typhoon Jebi hit Japan. Kansai International Airport, which was built on reclaimed land, suffered heavy flooding. Additionally, high winds blew an oil truck into the only bridge, damaging it. Ultimately, approximately 3,000 passengers became stranded in the airport terminal. On September 5, Japanese officials began rescue efforts, sending ships and buses to carry passengers out of the airport. Passengers from mainland China were taken to designated transfer stations, such as the parking lot of a shopping mall in Izumisano. Subsequently, the Chinese consulate in Osaka sent a car to collect mainland Chinese passengers.

The same day, an account on Weibo in mainland China bearing the username "Storm Baby" posted messages and fake videos claiming China was sending buses to the airport to rescue mainland Chinese passengers. Coverage of this fake story snowballed, eventually reaching content farm Guancha. On September 6, mainstream news began to report on the story, criticising TECO's perceived lack of action relative to China. The story began to gain popularity on the PTT Bulletin Board System, with the first post made by "Qingshan", a photojournalist from mainland China.

Another account named "GuRuGuRu" posted an article to PTT stating that there was no running water or electricity at Kansai Airport. He claimed to have taken a bus from the airport sent by the Chinese embassy, and that when he subsequently called TECO's Osaka office for help, he was treated rudely. Other Taiwanese media outlets would report this allegation in large numbers. The scandal spread further, and the Osaka office became the target of public criticism. On September 7, there were calls from opposition members in Taiwan to hold China accountable.

On September 14, Frank Hsieh arranged a review meeting on the incident. When Su failed to appear at work for the meeting, the secretary of the office visited the official residence of the director in Toyonaka and found that he had hung himself. Following the discovery, police were informed of the death and conducted a cordon search, discovering a suicide note.

== Aftermath ==
Subsequent investigation verified that the Chinese embassy had sent a car to the parking lot of the Izumisano City Shopping Center, not to the airport itself as had been claimed. Following Su's death, the police identified the "GuRuGuRu" account as belonging to a university student with the surname "You". The court later ruled that he was not guilty by way of impunity. Another woman, surnamed Pan, said that the account in fact belonged to her, not to You. Later, the Taiwanese government revised several laws to increase the penalties for spreading fake news, the maximum penalty becoming being life imprisonment.

Taiwanese state prosecutors investigated a social media account bearing the username "slow", which had been involved in propagating fake news about TECO. It was discovered the account belonged to Yang Hui-ru, an influencer and online troll with ties to the Democratic Progressive Party. Taiwanese prosecutors also alleged that Yang had operated a group chat named "Kaohsiung Group" on the Line messaging app, where she paid members NT$10,000 per month to spread false information to other online communities in an effort to sway public opinion. Much of this information was subsequently reported by the mainstream media uncritically.

On December 20, 2018, 100 days after Su Chii-cherng's death, his widow accepted an exclusive interview with EBC News. She stated that only his family had read the contents of the suicide note, and that it did not directly mention pressure caused by the fake news. They specified, however, that after completing a review report assigned by his superiors a day prior to the meeting, he expressed that he "did not want to be humiliated", and that he did not want to be punished unfairly and transferred to another position. She also alleged that politicians and media outlets were responsible for damage to Su's reputation, saying they had made unfair criticisms and willfully misled the public.

On March 4, 2019, Japan's NHK aired a special report on the incident as a part of the news program "Close-up Gendai" (クローズアップ).
