= Japanese Cultural Center (Taipei) =

Cultural center in Songshan, Taipei, Taiwan

- 日本文化中心
- Interactive map of Japanese Cultural Center
- Location: Songshan, Taipei, Taiwan
- Coordinates: 25°03′14.2″N 121°32′46.4″E
- Type: cultural center
- Public transit: Nanjing Fuxing Station

Construction
- Opened: 27 November 2017

The Japanese Cultural Center (Chinese: 日本文化中心; pinyin: Rìběn Wénhuà Zhōngxīn) is a cultural center in Songshan District, Taipei, Taiwan about Japan, located at Japan–Taiwan Exchange Association building.

== History ==
On 22 November 2017, a memorandum of understanding on cultural exchanges during the Taiwan-Japan economic and trade conference in Tokyo, Japan was signed. The cultural center was opened on 27 November 2017 in a ceremony attended by Japanese representative to Taiwan, Mikio Numata and head of Taiwan-Japan Relations Association, Chiou I-jen. In his opening remark, Chiou hoped that the center would continue promoting exchanges to boost the understanding of Taiwanese people on Japanese culture.

== Exhibitions ==
The cultural center features a library with more than 20,000 Japanese culture and tourism-related books.

== Activities ==
The cultural center is planning to hold a series of cultural exchange activities.

== Transportation ==
The cultural center is accessible within walking distance northeast of Nanjing Fuxing Station of Taipei Metro.

== See also ==
- Japan–Taiwan relations
