= Nelson Ku =

Taiwanese admiral, diplomat, and politician (1931–2007)

- 顧崇廉
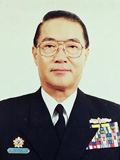

Member of the Legislative Yuan
- In office 1 February 2002 – 15 January 2007
- Succeeded by: Lee Fu-tien
- Constituency: Republic of China

ROC Representative to the Netherlands
- In office April 1997 – October 2000

Commander of the Republic of China Navy
- In office 16 April 1994 – 16 April 1997
- Preceded by: Chuang Ming-yao
- Succeeded by: Wu Shih-wen

Deputy Minister of National Defense
- In office 16 October 1993 – 1 May 1994
- Minister: Sun Chen

Deputy Chief of the General Staff of the Republic of China Armed Forces
- In office 1 May 1992 – 16 October 1993
- Chief: Liu Ho-chien

Deputy Commander of the Republic of China Navy
- In office 1 October 1990 – 1 May 1992
- Commander: Yeh Chang-tung

Lieutenant Commander of the Republic of China Navy
- In office 1988 – 1 October 1990
- Commander: Liu Ho-chien; Yeh Chang-tung

Superintendent of the Republic of China Naval Academy
- In office 1 December 1986 – 1 September 1988

Personal details
- Born: 6 June 1931 Shanghai, Republic of China
- Died: 15 January 2007 (aged 75) Zhongzheng, Taipei, Taiwan
- Party: People First Party (after 2001)
- Other political affiliations: Kuomintang (until 2001)

Military service
- Allegiance: Republic of China
- Branch/service: Republic of China Navy
- Years of service: 1954–1997
- Rank: Admiral
- Battles/wars: Third Taiwan Strait Crisis

Nelson Ku (Chinese: 顧崇廉; 6 June 1931 – 15 January 2007) was a Taiwanese politician, diplomat and naval officer. He served in the Republic of China Navy from 1954 to 1997, retiring with the rank of admiral. He was a member of the Legislative Yuan from 2002 until his death.

== Military career ==
Born Shanghai in 1931, Ku attended both the Republic of China Naval Academy and the United States Naval Academy, and entered the Republic of China Navy in 1954. He became close to Chen Shui-bian while serving as deputy defense minister between 1993 and 1994. As commander of the navy, a post he had assumed in 1994, Ku ended the Advanced Combat System, a program devised in the 1980s by Taiwan to develop a smaller version of the American-made Aegis Combat System. During his tenure, Ku reached an agreement with the United States Navy that allowed the Republic of China Navy use of American rescue vessels, if needed.

== Political career ==
Ku became the Republic of China's representative to the Netherlands in 1997. Chen Shui-bian assumed the presidency in 2000, and due to the friendship between Chen and Ku, it was speculated that Ku would accept an appointment as minister of defense in the Chen administration, a post that went to Wu Shih-wen. After three years as a diplomat, Ku was recalled and expected to retire. However, Ku was named to the People First Party proportional representation ballot in 2001. For accepting the nomination, he was expelled from the Kuomintang. He was strongly opposed to a 2002 proposal to acquire Kidd-class destroyers from the United States, favoring the purchase of Aegis-enabled vessels instead. Ku was critical of a separate plan to buy Standard SM-II missiles for over NT$40 million each. In 2003, Ku published a book about his naval career and joined the Friends of the PFP. The next year, two members of the United States House of Representatives proposed that Taiwan send the Republic of China Marine Corps to engage in the Iraq War, a move Ku believed to be unnecessary. He was involved in another discussion about the cost of arms procurement in October, over a set of special appropriations that cost NT$610.8 billion. Ku was again named a PFP at-large legislative candidate for the 2004 elections, and won. In 2005, he voted against an arms procurement bill that sought to fund a $480 billion purchase of eight diesel submarines along with missile batteries and military aircraft, berating the government for its dependence on the United States.

Ku was hospitalized in November 2006, and died of lymphatic cancer at Tri-Service General Hospital on 15 January 2007, aged 75.
