= Chiang Chung-ling =

Taiwanese army general

- 蔣仲苓
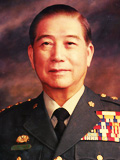

Vice Chairman of the Kuomintang
- In office 18 June 2000 – 30 March 2003
- Chairman: Lien Chan

20th Minister of National Defense
- In office 16 December 1994 – 31 January 1999
- President: Lee Teng-hui
- Deputy: Chao Chih-yuan; Wang Wen-hsieh; Wu Shih-wen
- Preceded by: Sun Chen
- Succeeded by: Tang Fei

17th Commander-in-Chief the Republic of China Army
- In office November 1981 – June 1988
- President: Chiang Ching-kuo
- Preceded by: Hau Pei-tsun
- Succeeded by: Huang Hsin-chiang

Personal details
- Born: September 21, 1922 Yiwu County, Chekiang Province, Republic of China
- Died: March 18, 2015 (aged 92) Taipei Veterans General Hospital, Taipei, Taiwan
- Awards: Order of Blue Sky and White Sun

Military service
- Allegiance: Republic of China
- Branch/service: Republic of China Army
- Years of service: 1936–1992
- Rank: General
- Battles/wars: Third Taiwan Strait Crisis

Chiang Chung-ling (Chinese: 蔣仲苓; pinyin: Jiǎng Zhònglíng; 21 September 1922 – 18 March 2015) was a Taiwanese army general, former Minister of Defense and Vice Chairman of the Kuomintang (Chinese Nationalist Party).

As Minister of Defense, he called for the use of Sky Horse missiles to rival Chinese M-class missiles. Also, several high-profile military deaths occurred during his term as Minister of Defense. When being questioned by reporters outside the parliament on September 19, 1995, he replied with a rhetorical question, "哪個地方不死人?" ("Where do people not die?"). His reply caused a sensation and public condemnation, and finally he apologized on September 25, 1995.

After a C-130H military transport plane crashed on October 10, 1997, near Taipei, Chiang Chung-ling resigned as Minister of Defense on October 11 to take responsibility for the crash, in which all five crew members died.

== Death ==
In 2015, he died at Taipei Veterans General Hospital, aged 92, of heart failure.
