= VA-165 (U.S. Navy) =

Attack Squadron 165
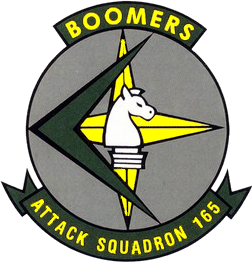
- VA-165 squadron patch
- Active: 1 September 1960 – 30 September 1996
- Country: United States
- Branch: United States Navy
- Role: Attack aircraft
- Nickname(s): Boomers
- Engagements: Vietnam War; Operation Formation Star; Operation Earnest Will; Operation Southern Watch; 1996 Taiwan Strait Crisis

Aircraft flown
- Attack: A-1 Skyraider; A-6A/B/C/E/TRAM/SWIP Intruder

VA-165, nicknamed the Boomers, was a long-lived Attack Squadron of the U.S. Navy. It was established on 1 September 1960, and disestablished 35 years later on 30 September 1996. The squadron operated in the region of Vietnam, Laos, and Korea during the 1960s and early 1970s. VA-165 transferred to the Persian Gulf after the 1973 Yom Kippur War, and also served near the Philippines during the late 1970s. During the 1980s, VA-165 was moved from the Middle East to Central America, particularly Nicaragua, back to Iran in the Middle East, off to South Korea, and then to the Middle East again for Kuwait. During the 1990s, the squadron worked in the United States, the Middle East, and Taiwan.

== History ==
=== 1960s ===
VA-165 was commissioned on 1 September 1960. In November 1963, the USS Oriskany, with VA-165 embarked, operated in the South China Sea during a crisis in South Vietnam and the coup that overthrew President Diem. The squadron began participation in combat operations over Laos in February 1965.

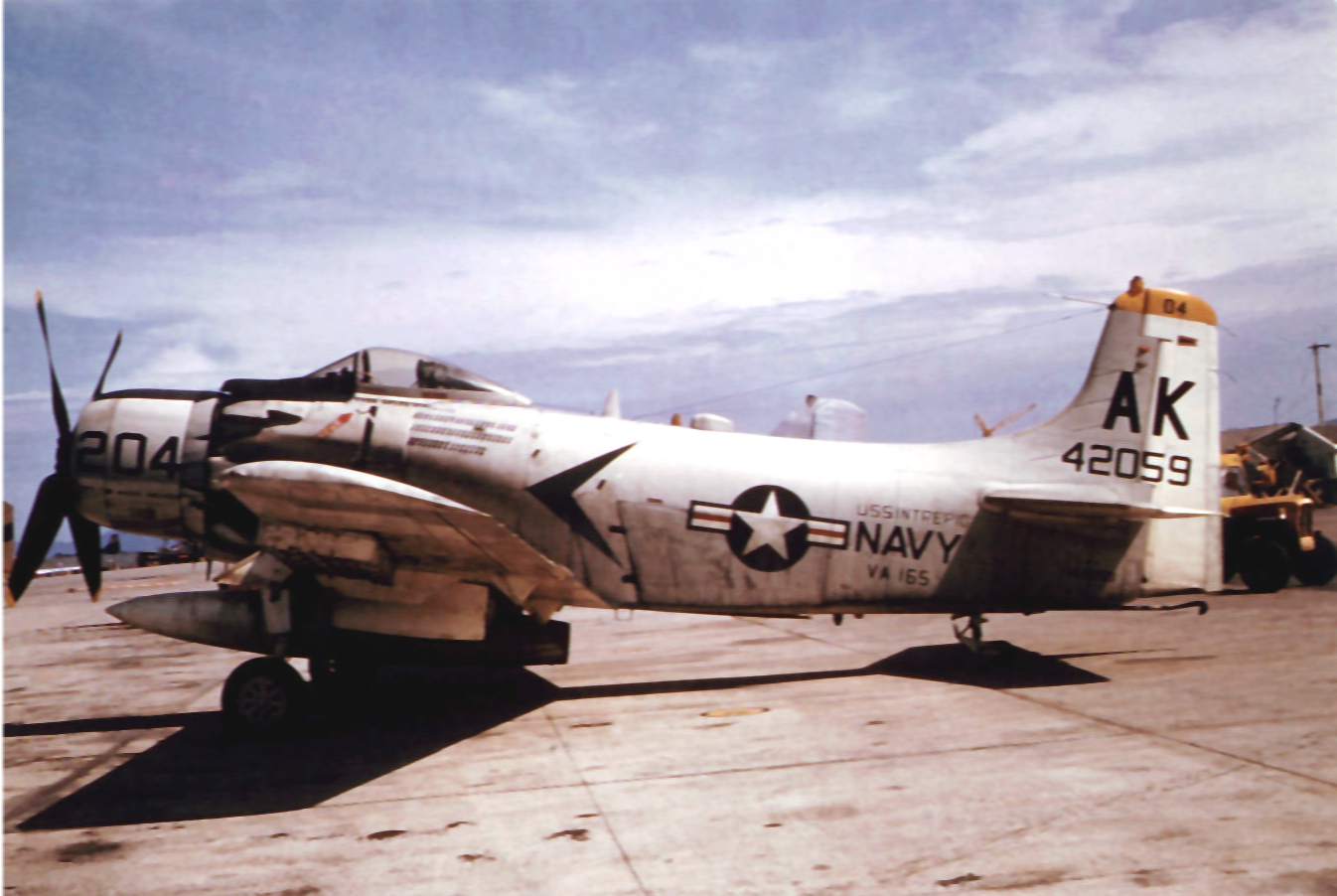
An A-1J Skyraider of VA-165 in 1966.

On 4 April 1966, VA-165 deployed to Vietnam as a component of CVW-10 embarked on USS Intrepid. This was the first all attack air wing and the first to deploy. Two squadrons flew the A-1 Skyraider and the other two squadrons flew the A-4 Skyhawk.

The 26th of January 1968 saw the USS Ranger, with VA-165 embarked, operating on Yankee Station, being ordered to the Sea of Japan following the capture of USS Pueblo on 23 January by the North Koreans. Ranger and VA-165 operated in the area until relieved on 5 March 1968. In April 1969, following the shooting down of a Navy EC-121 aircraft by the North Koreans on 15 April, Ranger, with VA-165 embarked, left Yankee Station and proceeded to the Sea of Japan for operations off the coast of Korea.

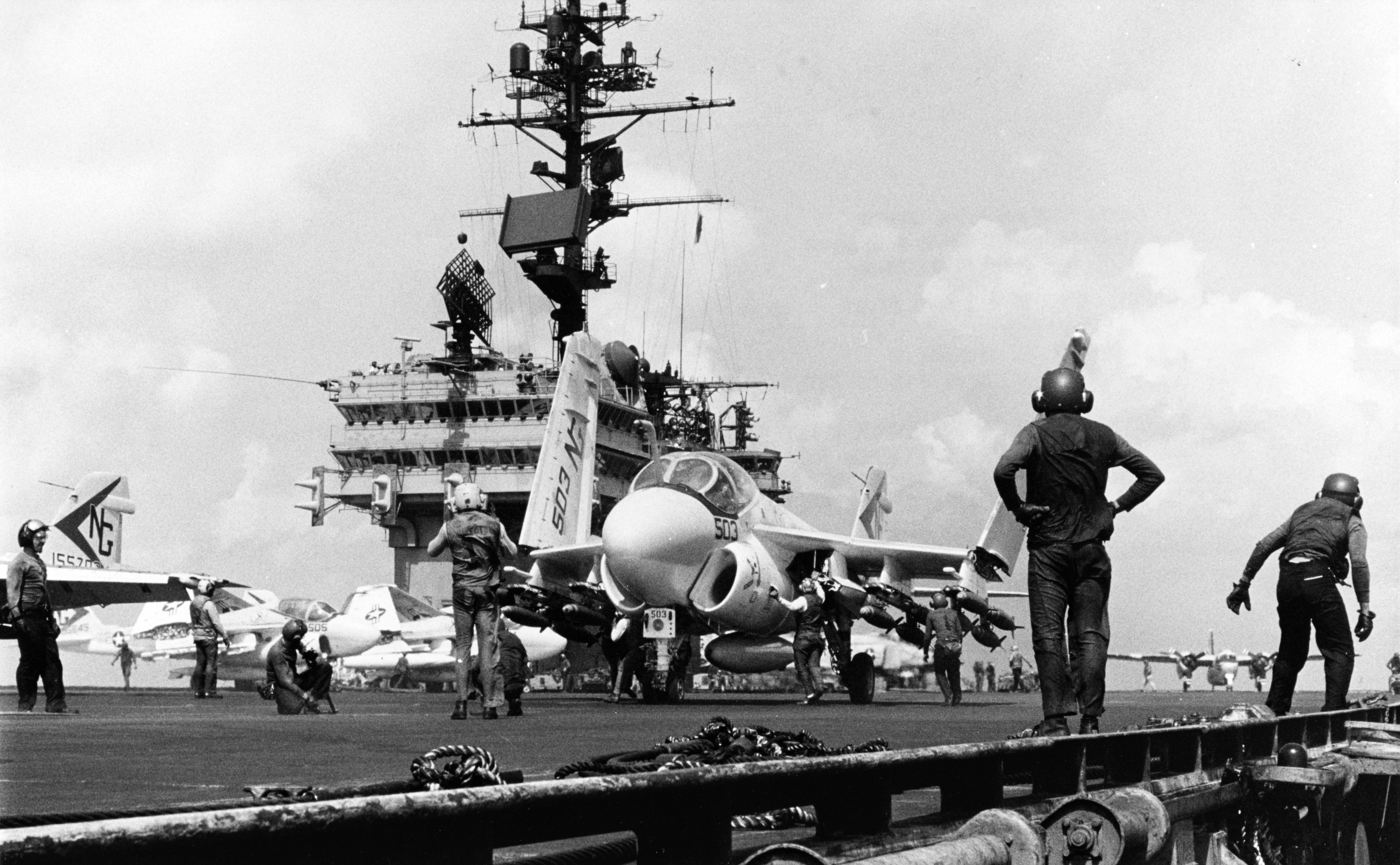
An A-6A of VA-165 preparing for launch aboard the Constellation on April 25, 1972.

=== 1970s ===
On 26 May 1970: The squadron's commanding officer, Commander F. M. Backman, flew the newest update version of the A-6 Intruder, the A-6C, into combat for the first time. In April 1972, VA-165 participated in Operation Freedom Train, tactical air sorties against military and logistic targets in the southern part of North Vietnam. It also provided support for forces in South Vietnam following a massive invasion by North Vietnam on 1 April 1972. In May, the squadron participated in the early phase of Operation Linebacker I, heavy air strikes against targets in North Vietnam above 20 degrees north latitude.

In November 1974, VA-165, part of the CVW-9 team embarked on USS Constellation, operated in the Persian Gulf. This was the first time in 26 years that an American carrier had entered and operated in the Persian Gulf. In March 1979: Constellation, with VA-165 embarked, was ordered to make a high speed transit to the Indian Ocean from the Philippines in response to the conflict between North and South Yemen.

=== 1980s ===
In October 1981, the squadron received the A-6E TRAM Intruder and became the first operational A-6 unit to deploy with the capability to fire the AGM-84A Harpoon. Between July–August 1983, USS Ranger, with VA-165 embarked, was ordered to operate off the coast of Nicaragua in response to the possible invasion of Honduras by Nicaragua. From October 1983–January 1984: Ranger, with VA-165 embarked, was extended on station in the Arabian Sea due to the threat by Iran to block oil exports from the Persian Gulf. In September 1988, USS Nimitz, with VA-165 embarked, operated in the Sea of Japan in support of the Summer Olympic Games in Seoul, Republic of Korea. In November, their aircraft participated in Operation Earnest Will, the escorting of reflagged Kuwaiti tankers through the Persian Gulf. In 1989, While deployed near the United States, their aircraft participated in the filming of Flight of the Intruder.

=== 1990s ===
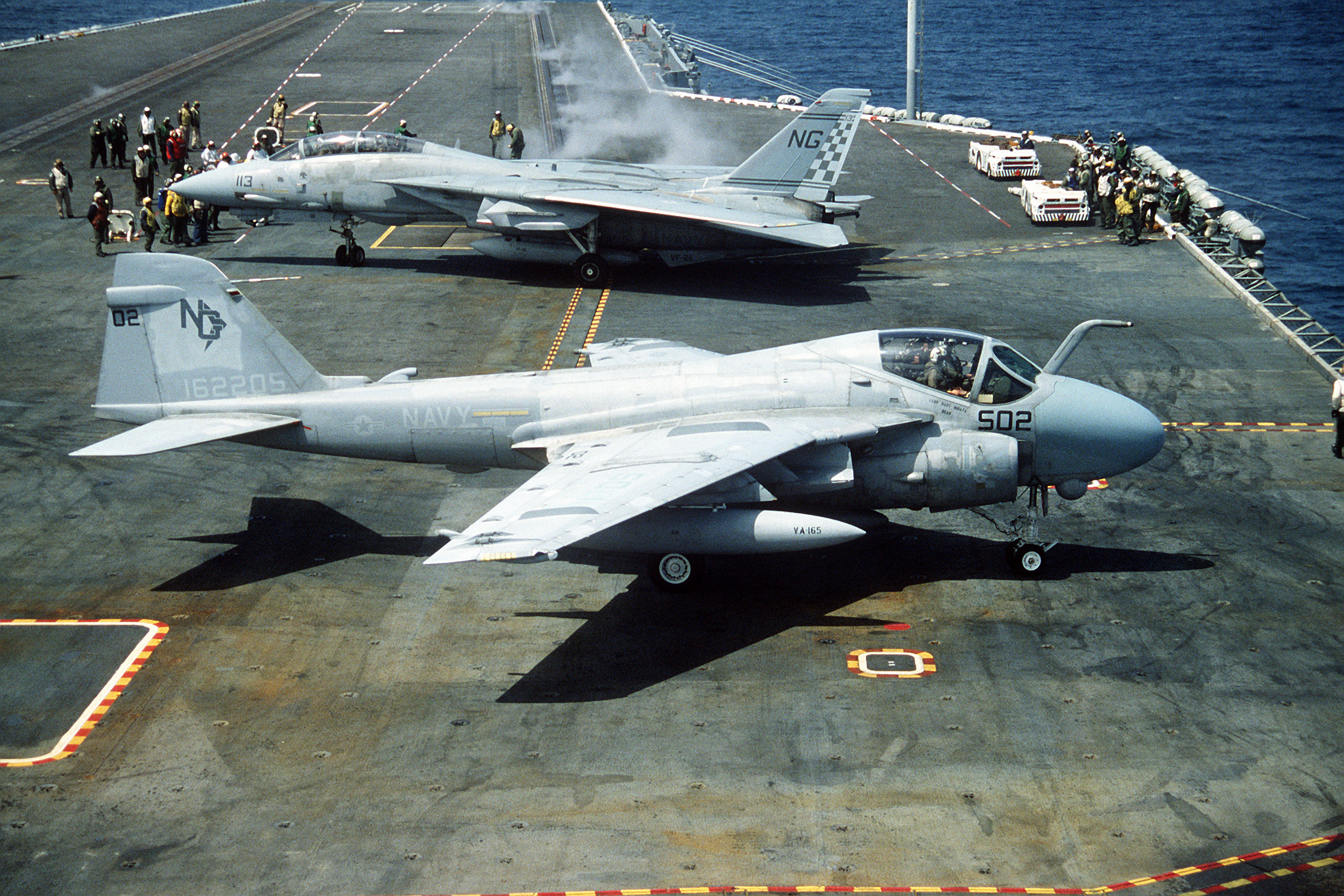
An A-6E SWIP Intruder of VA-165 aboard the USS Nimitz in 1992.

In 1990, VA-165 transitioned to the A-6E SWIP Intruder. That same year, the squadron sailed with the Constellation as the carrier moved back to East Coast around Cape Horn for its SLEP (Service Life Extension Program) overhaul.

Between February 25 and August 24, 1991; the squadron made deployment to the Persian Gulf region in the aftermath of the Gulf War. On February 2, 1993, they deployed again to take part in Operation Southern Watch. This was the last deployment that the KA-6D Tanker made with the US Navy, with VA-165 retiring it after their return.

VA-165's last deployment began on November 27, 1995. On the 19th of December, the squadron along with the Nimitz transited the Taiwan Strait during the early period of the Third Taiwan Strait Crisis. During the first part of 1996, the squadron flew missions in support of Southern Watch. However, when the Taiwan Strait crisis worsened in March 1996, VA-165 and the Nimitz Battlegroup were ordered to rush to the Taiwan Strait. On 26 July 1996, VA-165 held its decommissioning ceremony, with squadron being formally disestablished on 30 September 1996.

== Home port assignments ==
The squadron was assigned to these home ports, effective on the dates shown:

- NAS Jacksonville – 01 Sep 1960
- NAS Moffett Field – 07 Sep 1961
- NAS Alameda – 10 Mar 1964
- NAS Whidbey Island – 01 Jan 1967

== Aircraft assignment ==
The squadron first received the following aircraft on the dates shown:

- AD-6/A-1H Skyraider – 04 Oct 1960
- A-1J Skyraider – Jun 1963
- A-6A Intruder – May 1967
- A-6B Intruder – Nov 1969
- A-6C Intruder – 27 Feb 1970
- KA-6D Intruder – 28 Mar 1971
- A-6E Intruder – 20 Jan 1975
- A-6E TRAM Intruder – 1981
- A-6E SWIP Intruder – 1990

== See also ==
- List of squadrons in the Dictionary of American Naval Aviation Squadrons
- Attack aircraft
- List of inactive United States Navy aircraft squadrons
- History of the United States Navy
