= Japan–Taiwan Exchange Association =

Coordinates: 35°39′43.66″N 139°44′11.05″E

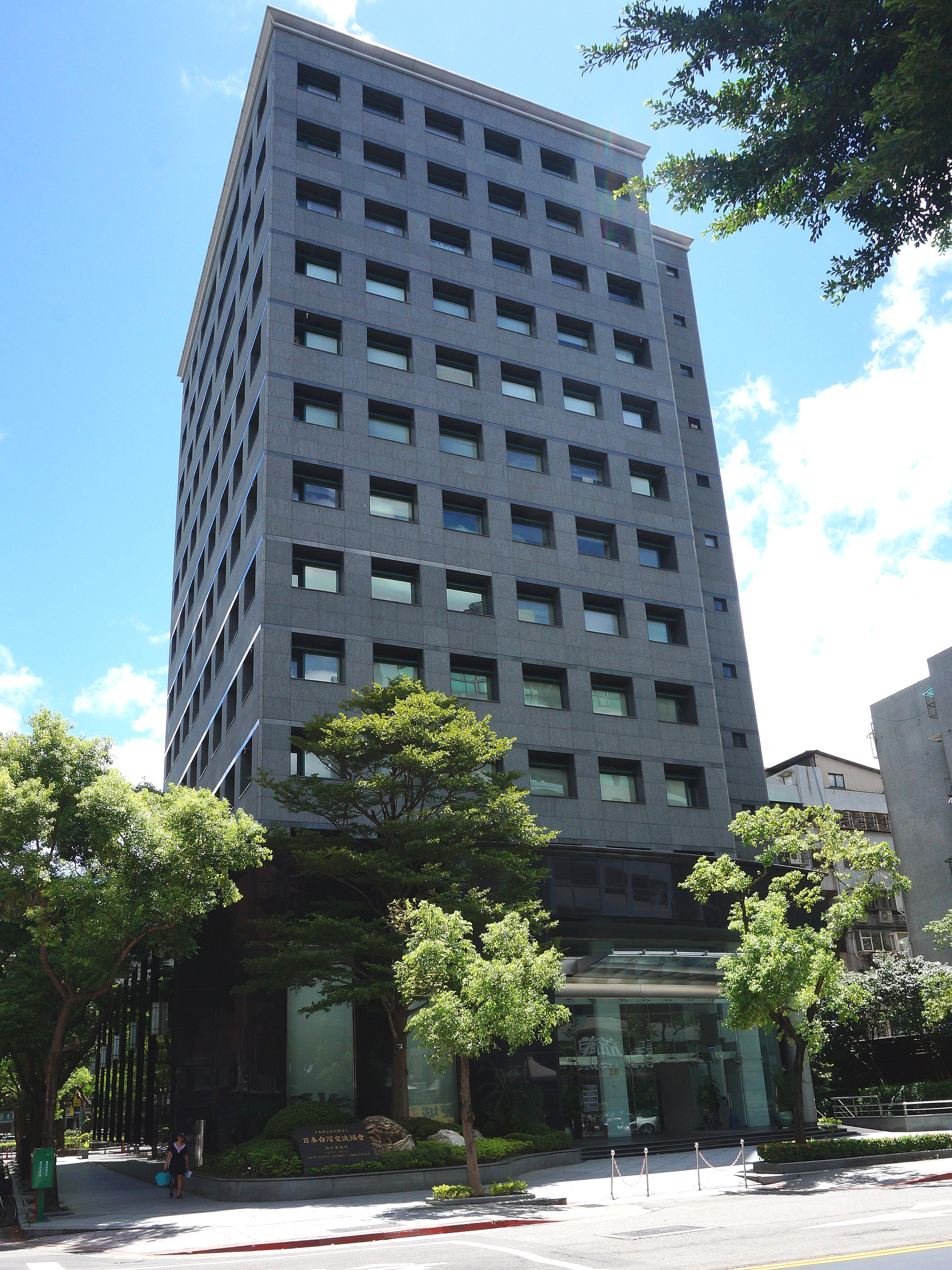
- The Taipei Office of the Japan–Taiwan Exchange Association

Agency overview
- Formed: 1 December 1972
- Jurisdiction: Republic of China (Taiwan)
- Headquarters: 7F, Aoba Roppongi Building, Roppongi, Minato, Tokyo
- Agency executive: Kazuyuki Katayama, Chief Representative
- Child agencies: Taipei Office 1F-6F, Tung Tai Building, 28 Chingcheng Street, Songshan District, Taipei; Kaohsiung Office 9F/10F, 87 Heping 1st Road, Lingya District, Kaohsiung
- Website: www.koryu.or.jp/en/

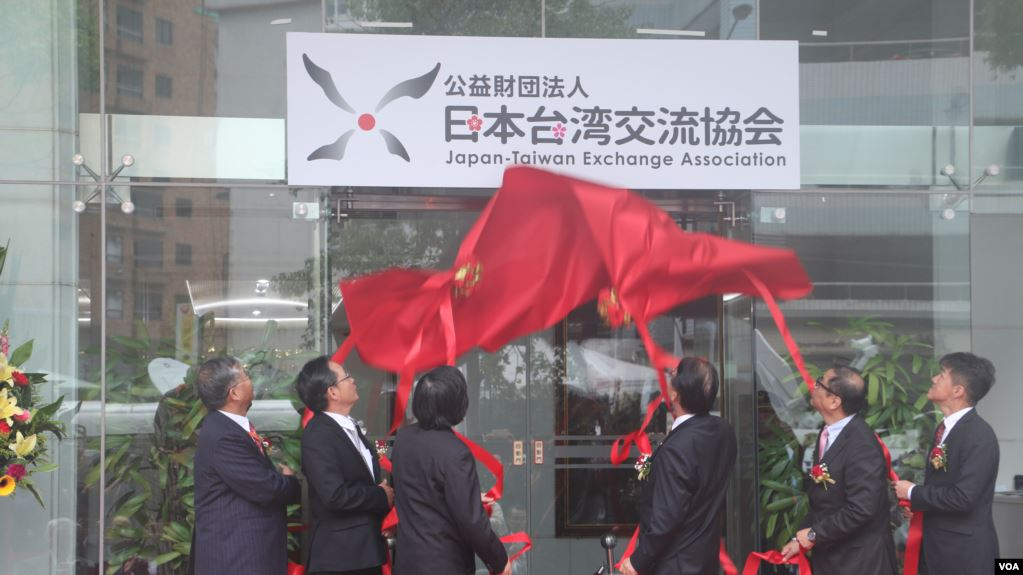
Plaque unveiling ceremony for the Japan–Taiwan Exchange Association in 2017

The Japan–Taiwan Exchange Association (日本台湾交流協会, Nihon Taiwan Kōryū Kyōkai) (Chinese: 日本台灣交流協會; pinyin: Rìběn Táiwān Jiāoliú Xiéhuì; Pe̍h-ōe-jī: Ji̍t-pún Tâi-oân Kau-liû Hia̍p-hōe), formerly known as Interchange Association, is an organization that represents the interests of Japan in Taiwan. In 2017, the current name was adopted. Its counterpart in Japan is the Taipei Economic and Cultural Representative Office in Japan, formerly the Tokyo Office of the Association of East Asian Relations (1972–1992).

The Association has two offices in Taipei and Kaohsiung. The Taipei office, located at 28 Ching Cheng Street, functions as the de facto embassy in Taiwan and houses the Japanese Cultural Center. The Kaohsiung office similarly functions as a de facto consulate-general. The headquarters in Tokyo works to connect the Ministry of Foreign Affairs and the Taipei office.

== History ==
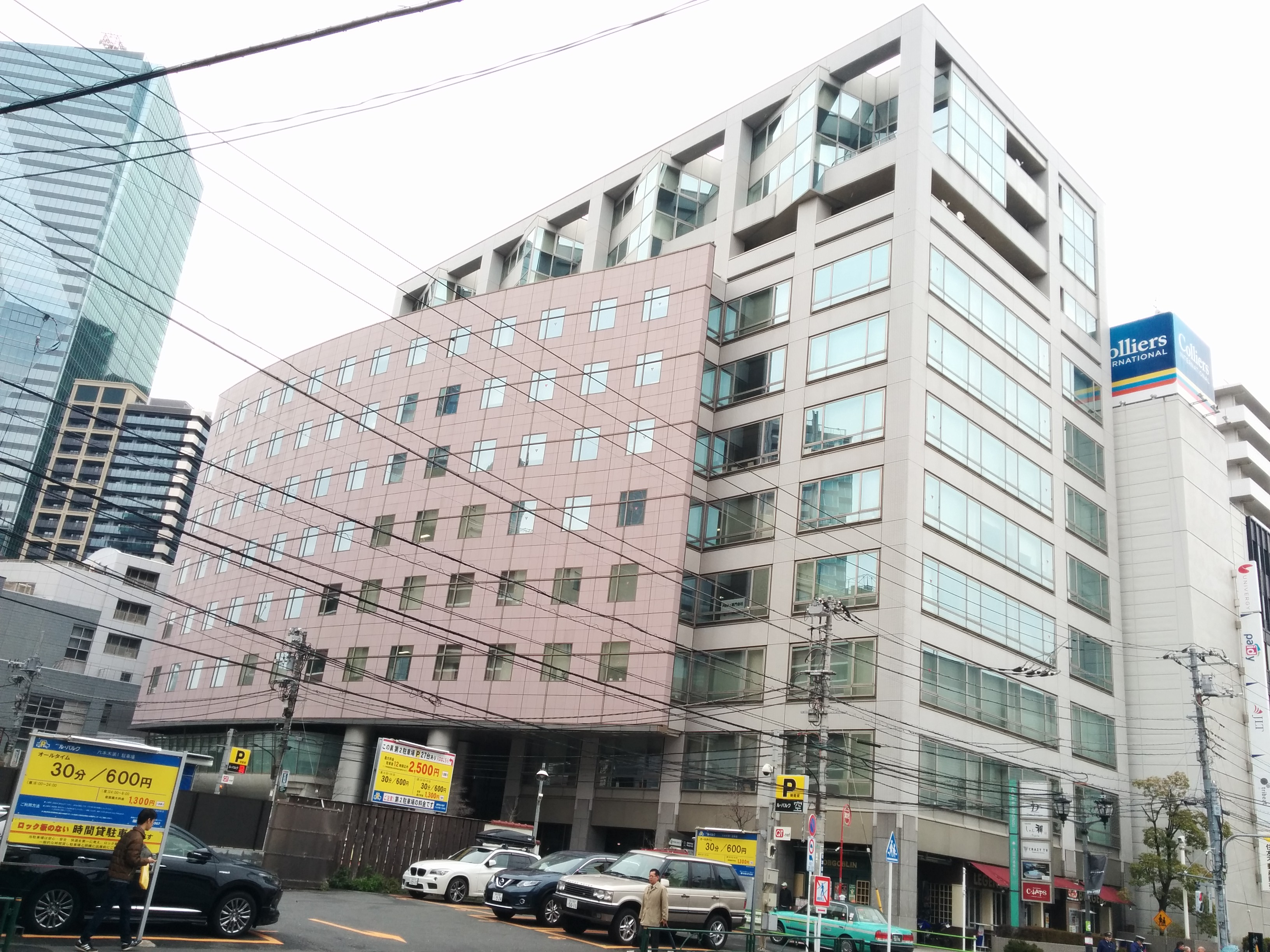
Tokyo Headquarters of the Japan–Taiwan Exchange Association

The establishment of diplomatic relations with the People's Republic of China in 1972 required termination of diplomatic relations with the Republic of China, and abrogation of the Sino-Japanese Peace Treaty.

The Association was established in the same year, and approved by the Ministry of Foreign Affairs and the Ministry of International Trade and Industry of Japan. It operated from the premises of the former Japanese Embassy. Its staff enjoy some diplomatic privileges as well as limited diplomatic immunity.

The arrangements under which Japan maintained unofficial relations with Taiwan became known as the "Japanese formula". This was adopted by other countries, notably the United States in 1979.

Following the renaming of the Association in 2017, the Ministry of Foreign Affairs of the People's Republic of China expressed its opposition to the new name.

== See also ==
- Japan–Taiwan relations
- List of diplomatic missions of Japan
