= Tang Fei =

Premier of the Republic of China (Taiwan)

- 唐飛
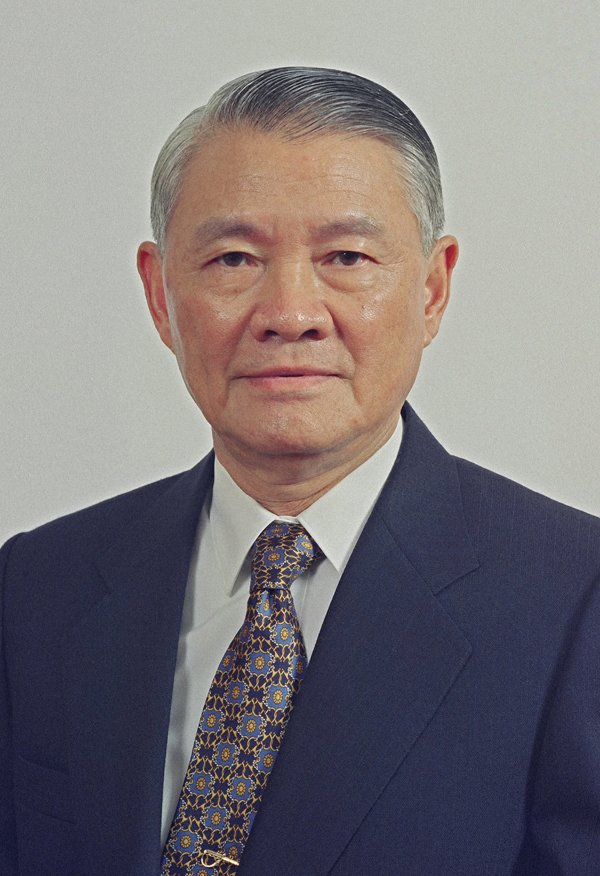
- Official portrait, 2000

13th Premier of Taiwan
- In office 20 May 2000 – 6 October 2000
- President: Chen Shui-bian
- Vice Premier: Yu Shyi-kun; Chang Chun-hsiung
- Preceded by: Vincent Siew
- Succeeded by: Chang Chun-hsiung

21st Minister of National Defense
- In office 1 February 1999 – 19 May 2000
- Premier: Hsiao Wan-chang
- Vice Minister: Wu Shih-wen
- Preceded by: Chiang Chung-ling
- Succeeded by: Wu Shih-wen
Additional offices
Senior Advisor to the President
In office 6 October 2000 – 20 May 2005
President	Chen Shui-bian
Military offices
16th Chief of the General Staff of the ROC Armed Forces
In office 5 March 1998 – 31 January 1999
President	Lee Teng-hui
Preceded by	Lo Ben-li
Succeeded by	Tang Yao-ming
16th Executive Vice Chief of the General Staff of the ROC Armed Forces
In office 1 July 1995 – 4 March 1998
President	Lee Teng-hui
Preceded by	Lo Ben-li
Succeeded by	Yang Te-chih (acting); Xia Ying-chou
12th Commander-in-Chief of the ROC Air Forces
In office 1 September 1992 – 30 June 1995
President	Lee Teng-hui
Preceded by	Lin Wen-li
Succeeded by	Huang Hsien-jung

Personal details
- Born: 15 March 1932 (age 94) Taicang, Jiangsu, Republic of China
- Party: Independent (2000–present)
- Other political affiliations: Kuomintang (1952–2000)
- Spouse: Chang Ming-tsan
- Education: Republic of China Air Force Academy (BS)

Military service
- Allegiance: Republic of China
- Branch/service: Republic of China Air Force
- Years of service: 1944–1999
- Rank: Senior General
- Battles/wars: Third Taiwan Strait Crisis

Tang Fei (Chinese: 唐飛; pinyin: Táng Fēi; born 15 March 1932) is a Taiwanese politician and retired ROC Air Force general. He served as the premier of the Republic of China from May 20 to October 2000, under the Chen Shui-bian government of the Democratic Progressive Party (DPP). However, as a member of the Kuomintang (KMT), he did not agree with Chen and the DPP's policies and resigned five months after assuming the premiership.

== Biography ==
Tang Fei was born on March 15, 1932, in Taicang, Jiangsu, Republic of China. He enrolled in the Chinese Air Force Preparatory School at the age of 12 and graduated in 1950. He later studied at the Republic of China Air Force Academy from which he graduated in 1952. He completed advanced military education at the Air Force Squadron Officers' Course in 1963, Air Force Command and General Staff College of the Armed Forces University in 1971, and the War College in 1979.

He served in a wide range of combat, staff, and overseas positions during his military career, starting as a pilot from 1953 to 1960, then moving to operations officer from 1960 to 1961, flight leader from 1961 to 1965, and squadron commander from 1968 to 1970.

As his first overseas assignment, Tang was posted to the ROC embassy in Washington as assistant air attaché from 1972 to 1975. Upon returning to Taiwan, he served as chief of the operations section of the Third Wing from 1975 to 1976, and later was group commander from 1976 to 1978. From 1979 to 1982, he was again posted abroad, this time as armed forces attaché in the ROC embassy in South Africa.

Back in Taiwan, he served as wing commander from 1983 to 1984 and Air Force deputy chief of staff for planning from 1984 to 1985. In 1985, Tang was appointed superintendent of the Chinese Air Force Academy, and was later promoted to director of the Air Force's Department of Political Warfare, the position that he held from 1986 to 1989.

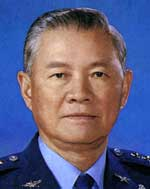
Tang Fei as a senior general of the Air Force.

In 1989, he first served as commanding general of the Combat Air Command and then vice commander-in-chief of the ROC Air Force from 1989 to 1991. He was then appointed director of the Department of Inspection of the Ministry of National Defense (MND) from 1991 to 1992, commander-in-chief of the ROC Air Force from 1992 to 1995, and vice chief of the general staff (executive) from 1995 to 1998.

In 1998, he was promoted to four-star general and chief of the general staff. He became the first military officer to answer questions during interpellations at the Legislative Yuan. In 1999, he retired from the military, upon his appointment as minister of national defense, a civilian position.

Tang was not only responsible for essential military equipment and personnel modernization programs, but he was also instrumental in formulating the new National Defense Law and the Organization Law of the Ministry of National Defense, which reorganized and streamlined the military command structure, giving the MND more authority over the General Staff Headquarters.

On March 29, 2000, president-elect Chen Shui-bian announced that Tang had been chosen as premier to head the new cabinet. He served as premier until his resignation four and a half months later on 3 October.

Government offices
Preceded by Lin Wen-li	ROC Air Force Commander-in-Chief; 1992–1995	Succeeded by Huang Hsien-jung
Preceded by Lo Pen-li	ROC Chief of the General Staff; 1998–1999	Succeeded by Tang Yao-ming
Preceded by Chiang Chung-ling	ROC Minister of National Defense; 1999–2000	Succeeded by Wu Shih-wen
Preceded by Vincent Siew	Premier of the Republic of China; 2000	Succeeded by Chang Chun-hsiung
