= Third Taiwan Strait Crisis =

1995–96 period of tension between the PRC and ROC

← 2nd Third Taiwan Strait Crisis 4th →
- Part of the cross-strait conflict
- Locations of the combined operational zones utilized by the PLA for their missile tests
Date	21 July 1995 – 23 March 1996 (8 months and 2 days)
Location	Taiwan Strait
Result	Inconclusive

Belligerents
Republic of China (Taiwan); Supported by: United States	People's Republic of China

Commanders and leaders
Lee Teng-hui; Lien Chan; Chiang Chung-ling; Tang Fei; Wu Shih-wen; Tang Yao-ming; Nelson Ku; Huang Hsien-jung; Wang Jo-yu; Bill Clinton; John Shalikashvili; Archie Clemins; Lyle Bien	Jiang Zemin; Li Peng; Liu Huaqing; Zhang Zhen; Zhang Lianzhong; Chi Haotian; Zhang Wannian; Fu Quanyou

Units involved
Republic of China Armed Forces; United States Armed Forces	People's Liberation Army

Strength
(Taiwan); MIM-104 Patriot, MIM-23 Hawk, Nike Hercules, F-5 Tiger, F-CK-1, F-104 Starfighter, Knox-class frigate, Oliver Hazard Perry-class frigate, etc. USS Independence (CV-62), USS Nimitz (CVN-68), USS Belleau Wood (LHA-3), USS Bunker Hill (CG-52), etc.	(China) DF-15, Chengdu J-7, Shenyang J-8, etc.

The Third Taiwan Strait Crisis, also called the 1995–1996 Taiwan Strait Crisis, or the 1996 Taiwan Strait Crisis, was the effect of a series of missile tests conducted by the People's Republic of China (PRC) in the waters surrounding Taiwan, including the Taiwan Strait, from 21 July 1995 to 23 March 1996. The first set of missiles fired in mid-to-late 1995 was allegedly intended to send a strong signal to the Republic of China government (ROC) under President Lee Teng-hui, who had been seen as "moving its foreign policy away from the One-China policy", as claimed by the PRC. The second set of missiles was fired in early 1996, allegedly intending to intimidate the Taiwanese electorate in the run-up to the 1996 presidential election.

== Lee's 1995 visit to Cornell ==
The crisis began when President Lee Teng-hui accepted an invitation from his alma mater, Cornell University, to deliver a speech on "Taiwan's Democratization Experience". Seeking to diplomatically isolate the Republic of China, the PRC opposed such visits by ROC (Taiwanese) leaders. A year earlier, in 1994, when President Lee's plane had stopped in Honolulu to refuel after a trip to South America, the U.S. government under President Bill Clinton refused Lee's request for a visa. Lee had been confined to the military airfield where he landed, forcing him to spend a night on his plane. A U.S. State Department official called the situation "embarrassing" and Lee complained that he was being treated as a second-class leader.

After Lee had decided to visit Cornell, U.S. Secretary of State Warren Christopher assured PRC Foreign Minister Qian Qichen that a visa for Lee would be "inconsistent with [the U.S.'s] unofficial relationship [with Taiwan]." However, the humiliation from Lee's last visit caught the attention of many pro-Taiwan figures in the U.S. and this time, the United States Congress acted on Lee's behalf. The lobbying firm Cassidy & Associates worked to obtain Congressional support for the visit. In May 1995, a concurrent resolution asking the State Department to allow Lee to visit the U.S. passed the House on 2 May with a vote of 396 to 0 (with 38 not voting), and the Senate on 9 May with a vote of 97 to 1 (with 2 not voting). The State Department relented on 22 May 1995. Lee spent 9–10 June 1995 in the U.S. at a Cornell alumni reunion.

The United States had not prepared the People's Republic of China for its policy reversal in granting a visa. While in the United States, Lee stated, "Taiwan is a country with independent sovereignty. PRC leadership described Lee's moves as an effort to "split the motherland".

== 1995 ==
In July 1995, Xinhua News Agency announced missile tests would be conducted by the People's Liberation Army (PLA); later, it announced when the exercises finished. The PRC mobilized forces in Fujian. The PRC sent officials to both Washington D.C. and Taipei to convey that the PRC did not intend to invade Taiwan. According to Sankei Shimbun series "Secret Records on Lee Teng-hui" dated 1 April 2019, Tseng Yong-hsien, Lee's National Policy Adviser, received a direct official message from China in early July 1995; "Our ballistic missiles will be launched toward Taiwan a couple of weeks later, but you guys don't have to worry." This was communicated to Lee soon after, to prevent escalation. Tseng, as an envoy of Lee, had met President Yang Shangkun in 1992 and had a secret connection with Ye Xuanning, Head of the Liaison Department of the PLA.

From 21 July to 28 July, the Second Artillery Corps (SAC) conducted a round of missile launches in an area 36 miles north of Taiwan. On 21 July, SAC launched two Dongfeng-15 missiles approximately 70 nautical miles from the coast of Taiwan. On 22 July, SAC fired two missiles at an area 40 miles north of Taiwan. On 24 July, it fired two more at the same area. Simultaneously, the PRC concentrated naval and amphibious landing forces in the area of the strait and conducted military exercises.

The United States responded by sending two aircraft carrier groups to the vicinity of Taiwan. In July 1995, USS Belleau Wood (LHA-3) transited the Taiwan Strait.

From 15 August to 25 August, the East Sea Fleet deployed 59 naval vessels for exercises, during which the People's Liberation Army Air Force practiced 192 sorties. Naval exercises continued in September and October. In November, the PLA conducted a major amphibious landing exercise in the Nanjing Military Region.

The United States sent the USS O'Brien (DD-975) and USS McClusky (FFG-41) through the strait on 11–12 December 1995. Finally, on 19 December 1995, the USS Nimitz (CVN-68) and her battle group passed through the straits.

== 1996 ==
Between January and February 1996, the PRC concentrated 100,000 troops along the strait and conducted large-scale exercises. Tensions remained high in early 1996, as Taiwan prepared for its first presidential election and Lee Teng-hui ran on the Kuomintang's ticket. On 4 January 1996, US Assistant Secretary of Defense Chas W. Freeman Jr. warned the Clinton Administration that a Chinese General had threatened to him that the PLA had prepared plans for firing conventional missiles into Taiwan for 30 days, with one missile attack each day.

On 8 March, the PRC fired more missiles 20 miles off Keelung and 29 miles off Kaohsiung. Over 70 percent of commercial shipping passed through the targeted ports, which were disrupted by the proximity of the tests. The PRC also conducted a launch on 11 March.

On 10 March, the United States announced that it was dispatching the USS Independence toward the strait. According to The Washington Post, that same day, the USS Bunker Hill CG-52 (which had detached from the Independence Battlegroup), along with an RC-135 Intelligence aircraft, monitored the launch of 3 CSS-6 (DF-15) missiles from the PRC, two of them into shipping lanes near Kaohsiung and one fired directly over Taipei into a shipping lane near Keelung.

On the following day, the PRC announced live-fire exercises to be conducted near Penghu from 12 to 20 March. On 11 March, the U.S. dispatched USS Nimitz CVN-68 and her battlegroup, Carrier Group Seven. Nimitz and her battle group, along with Belleau Wood, sailed through the Taiwan Strait, while Independence did not. The PRC 12 March to 20 March exercises proceeded and in response to the U.S. moves, the PRC announced further exercises.

From 18 March to 25 March, the PRC conducted military exercises involving airplanes, guided missile destroyers, submarines, and 150,000 troops at Pingtan Island. The exercises practiced amphibious landing, mountainous assaults, and included paratrooper exercises.

== Aftermath ==
Shipping and insurance rates for freight to Taiwan radically increased during the crisis and two of the Chinese missile launches twice closed the straits to all sea and airborne commerce.

The crisis boosted Lee by 5% in the polls, earning him a majority as opposed to a plurality. On March 23, 1996, Lee was elected Taiwan's president.

The PLA viewed the 1995 military exercises as successful. Zhang Wannian stated, "First, they showed the strong resolve of the PLA in protecting national unity; second, they served as a warning to the outside intervening powers; third, they also provided encouragement for the people on Taiwan who supported peaceful reunification of the island." Fu Quanyou reported to Central Military Commission that the 1995 exercises were "all extremely successful: they attacked the power of the 'Taiwan separatists' represented by Lee Teng-hui, warned the United States as the main outside intervening power, and they were forcefully accompanied by political and diplomatic struggles and were highly praised by the Politburo and the CMC."

The PLA believed that it lacked sufficient leverage in comparison to the United States. Jiang ordered the PLA to begin a ten-year modernization program. Soon, the People's Republic ordered Sovremenny-class destroyers from Russia, a Cold War-era class designed to counter U.S. Navy carrier battle groups, allegedly in mid-December 1996 during the visit to Moscow by Chinese Premier Li Peng. The PRC subsequently ordered modern attack submarines (Kilo class) and warplanes (76 Su-30MKK and 24 Su-30MK2) to counter the U.S. Navy's carrier groups.

The military tests and exercises also strengthened the argument for further U.S. arms sales to the ROC and led to the strengthening of military ties between the U.S. and Japan, increasing the role Japan would play in defending Taiwan.

During the military exercises in March, concerns arose in Taiwan that the PRC would occupy some small islands controlled by Taiwan, causing panic among many citizens. Therefore, many flights from Taiwan to the United States and Canada were full. The most likely target was Wuqiu (Wuchiu), then garrisoned by 500 soldiers. The outlying islands were placed on high alert. The then Secretary General of the National Security Council of Taiwan, Ting Mao-shih, flew to New York to meet Samuel Berger, Deputy National Security Advisor of the United States.

In 1999, Major General Liu Liankun, a top Chinese military logistics officer, and his subordinate Senior Colonel Shao Zhengzhong were arrested, court-martialed and executed for disclosing to Taiwan that the missiles had unarmed warheads despite the Chinese government's claims.

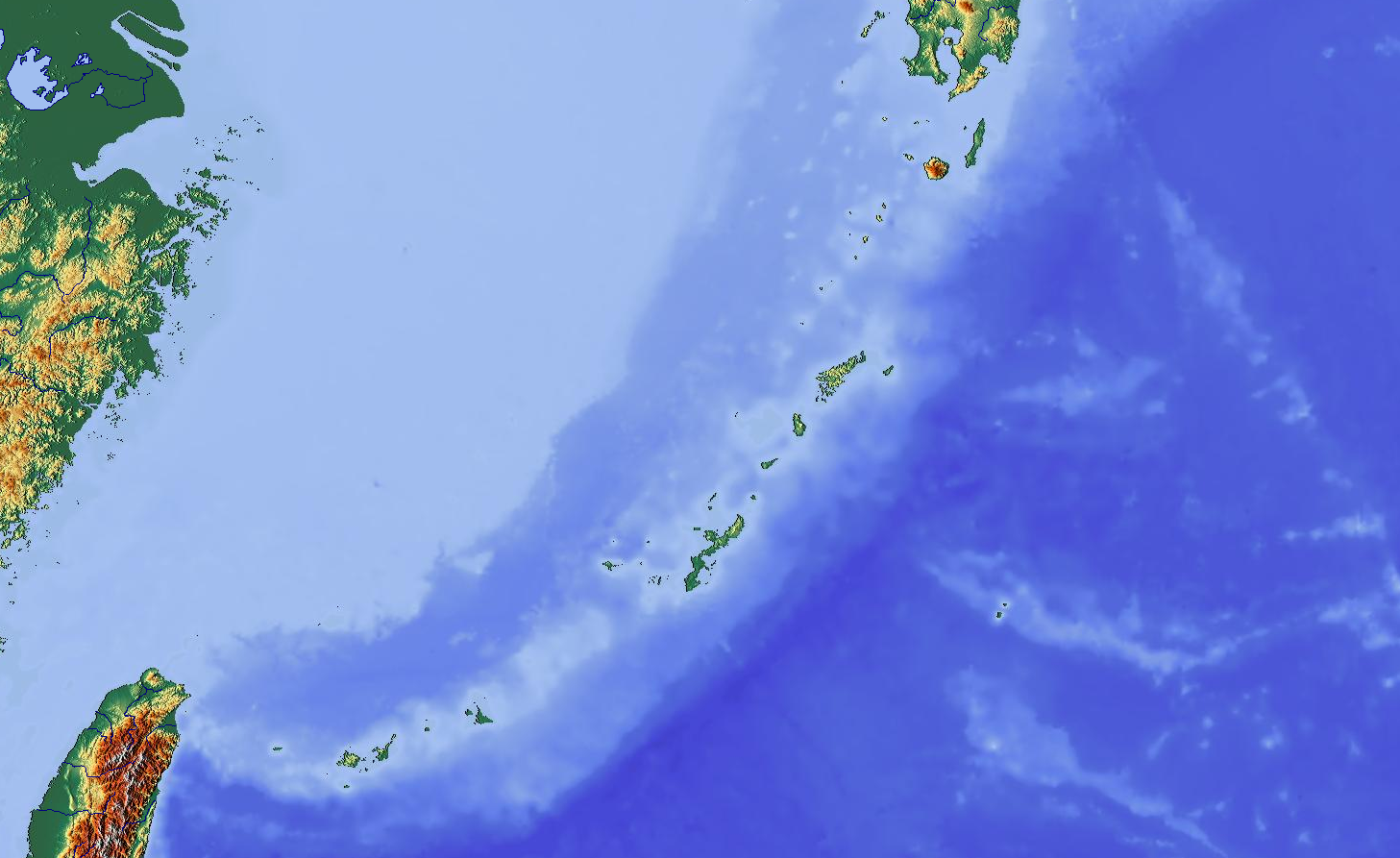
The four vertices (red) (23°13′N 122°20′E, 25°13′N 122°40′E, 24°57′N 122°40′E, 24°57′N 122°20′E) of the announced quadrilateral area reserved for the military exercise off Keelung (orange) between 8 and 15 March 1996.
The four vertices (red) (22°38′N 119°25′E, 22°38′N 119°45′E, 22°22′N 119°45′E, 22°22′N 119°25′E) of the announced quadrilateral area reserved for the military exercise off Kaohsiung (orange) between 8 and 15 March 1996.
The four vertices (red) (23°57′N 118°06′E, 23°25′N 118°50′E, 22°30′N 117°30′E, 23°01′N 116°46′E) of the announced quadrilateral area reserved for the military exercise between 12 and 20 March 1996.
The four vertices (red) (25°50′N 119°50′E, 25°32′N 120°24′E, 24°54′N 119°56′E, 25°12′N 119°26′E) of the announced quadrilateral area reserved for the military exercise between 18 and 25 March 1996.

== U.S. order of battle (March 1996 – May 1996) ==
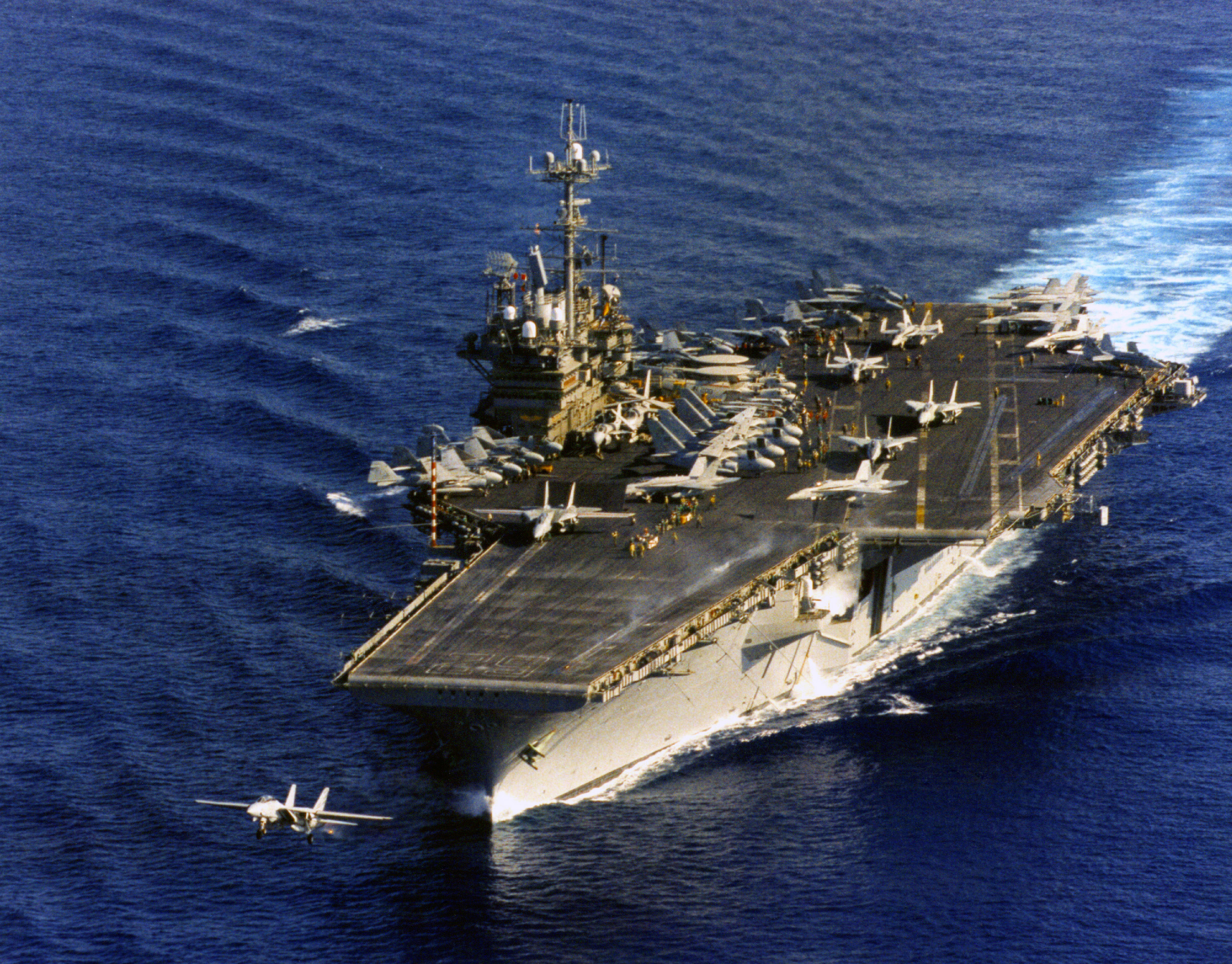
USS Independence CV-62 on 10 March 1996.

=== U.S. 7th Fleet ===
- Carrier Group 5 - Independence CVBG - (East China Sea)
  - USS Independence CV-62 (Forrestal Class Carrier)
    - Carrier Air Wing 5 - NF
      - VF-154 Black Knights - F-14A Tomcat (TARPS equipped)
      - VFA-192 Golden Dragons - F/A-18C Hornet
      - VFA-195 Dambusters - F/A-18C Hornet
      - VA-115 Eagles - A-6E SWIP Intruder
      - VAQ-136 Gauntlets - EA-6B Prowler
      - VS-21 Red Tails - S-3B Viking
      - VAW-115 Liberty Bells - E-2C Hawkeye
      - VQ-5 Sea Shadows Det.A - ES-3A Shadow
      - HS-14 Chargers - SH-60F Oceanhawk/HH-60H Rescuehawk
  - USS Bunker Hill CG-52 (Ticonderoga Class VLS Cruiser) - (Detached from the Battlegroup southeast of the ROC)
  - USS Hewitt DD-966 (Spruance Class VLS Destroyer)
  - USS O'Brien DD-975 (Spruance Class VLS Destroyer)
  - USS McClusky FFG-41 (Oliver H. Perry Class Frigate)* - After May 10, 1996*
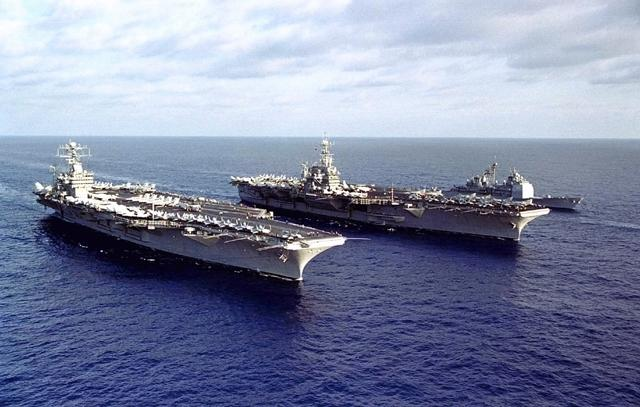
- Nimitz (left) cruising with Independence and Port Royal in the Sea of Japan in September 1997
  Carrier Group 7 - Nimitz CVBG - (Taiwan Strait)
  - USS Nimitz CVN-68 (Nimitz Class Carrier)
    - Carrier Air Wing 9 - NG
      - VF-24 Fighting Renegades - F-14A Tomcat
      - VF-211 Checkmates - F-14A Tomcat (TARPS equipped)
      - VFA-146 Blue Diamonds - F/A-18C (Night Attack) Hornet
      - VFA-147 Argonauts - F/A-18C (Night Attack) Hornet
      - VA-165 Boomers - A-6E SWIP Intruder
      - VAQ-138 Yellow Jackets - EA-6B Prowler
      - VS-33 Screwbirds - S-3B Viking
      - VAW-112 Golden Hawks - E-2C Hawkeye
      - VQ-5 Sea Shadows Det.C - ES-3A Shadow
      - HS-8 Eightballers - SH-60F Oceanhawk/HH-60H Rescuehawk
  - USS Port Royal CG-73 (Ticonderoga Class VLS Cruiser)
  - USS Oldendorf DD-972 (Spruance Class VLS Destroyer)
  - USS Callaghan DD-994 (Kidd Class Destroyer)
  - USS Ford FFG-54 (Oliver H. Perry Class Frigate)
- Amphibious Squadron 11 - Belleau Wood ARG - (Taiwan Strait)
  - USS Belleau Wood LHA-3 (Tarawa Class Amphibious Assault Ship)
    - 31st Marine Expeditionary Unit
      - VMA-311 Tomcats Det. - AV-8B Harrier II
      - HMLA Det. - AH-1W Super Cobra/UH-1N Twin Huey
      - HMH-466 Wolfpack Det. - CH-53E Super Stallion
      - HMM-265 Dragons - CH-46E Sea Knight

== See also ==
- Political status of Taiwan
- Battle of Guningtou
- First Taiwan Strait Crisis
- Second Taiwan Strait Crisis
- Fourth Taiwan Strait Crisis
  - 2022 United States congressional delegation visit to Taiwan
  - 2022 Chinese military exercises around Taiwan
- Hainan Island incident
- Taiwan Relations Act
- Chinese Civil War
