= Lee Fu-tien =

Taiwanese lawyer and politician

- 李復甸

Member of the Control Yuan
- In office 1 August 2008 – 31 July 2014

Member of the Legislative Yuan
- In office 18 January 2007 – 31 January 2008
- Preceded by: Nelson Ku
- Constituency: Republic of China

Personal details
- Born: 4 January 1952 (age 74) Taipei, Taiwan
- Party: People First Party
- Education: Chinese Culture University (LLB, PhD); Soochow University (LLM)
- Profession: Lawyer

Lee Fu-tien (Chinese: 李復甸; pinyin: Lǐ Fùdiān; born 4 January 1952) is a Taiwanese legal scholar and politician.

== Early life and education ==
Lee was born in Taipei on 4 January 1952. He studied law at Chinese Culture University, where he earned his Bachelor of Laws (LL.B.), and Soochow University, where he earned his Master of Laws (LL.M.) in 1977. In 1986, Lee also earned a Ph.D. in law from Chinese Culture University. He taught law at CCU and was dean of the law school at Shih Hsin University, during which period he was a visiting scholar at Yale Law School.

== Legal career ==
When Diane Lee was assaulted by Lo Fu-chu in March 2001, she hired Lee Fu-tien to represent her in court. In January 2004, he and Wellington Koo were two of six Taiwanese lawyers selected by the Straits Exchange Foundation to represent taishang who had been accused of spying in China. By Chinese law, Taiwanese defendants must be represented by Chinese lawyers, and as such, the legal professionals from Taiwan were asked to serve as liaisons between the defendants and their Chinese attorneys.

Lee was named a legislative candidate via the People First Party party list in October 2004, but was not elected. He then taught law at Chinese Culture University and represented James Soong in 2006, who charged Chen Shui-bian with slander.

== Political career ==
Upon the death of Nelson Ku in January 2007, Lee was nominated to finish Ku's term in office. After Taipei County Council member Wu Shan-jeou was shot and killed, Lee argued for amendments to the Statute Regulating Firearms, Ammunition, Knives and Other Deadly Weapons, favoring harsher penalties. During Ma Ying-jeou's 2007 corruption case, Lee petitioned the Ministry of Justice to rule on the status of special allowance funds Ma was alleged to have used as income.

Lee was later appointed to the Control Yuan and began a formal examination of corruption charges against Chen Shui-bian. In 2009, the agency found that two Special Investigation Panel investigators had contacted Chen Shui-bian as the corruption probe continued. The first vote to impeach State Public Prosecutor-General Chen Tsung-ming in relation to the Chen Shui-bian case was held in January 2010, and failed. Three weeks later, a second vote on the impeachment of Chen Tsung-ming passed, and Chen subsequently resigned his post.

Lee was also involved in investigations of corruption within law enforcement in Taipei County and Chiayi City. He led the 2009 impeachment of former Transportation Minister Lin Ling-san, who was found to have made illegal investments in Taiwan High Speed Rail. Lee was responsible for a 2010 investigation that found Taiwan's immigration system had held foreign nationals longer than legally permitted. Facilities for foreigners detained by Taiwan were also of substandard quality. In October, the Control Yuan impeached judges Hsiao Yang-kuei of the Supreme Court and Kao Ming-che of the High Court, at the suggestion of Huang Wu-tzu and Lee. Hsiao and Kao were found to have lobbied other judges to secure a "not guilty" ruling for Hsiao's son. A year later, in October 2011, Lee, Shen Mei-chen, and Liu Yu-shan announced a review of the government subsidy available to farmers. The inquiry was opposed by multiple members of the Legislative Yuan, and the parliament eventually passed an amendment raising the value of the subsidy to NT$7,000. After civilians broke into a military compound in December 2011, Lee and Huang began an investigation into the Republic of China Army's security measures. In 2012, Lee and Teresa Yin moved to impeach National Taiwan University Hospital director Ko Wen-je for an oversight in organ donation and transplantation. Control Yuan President Wang Chien-shien remarked in 2013 that the agency should be abolished. Lee criticized Wang for the statement, replying that Wang did not work to improve the Control Yuan, but only attempted to limit its powers. Shortly after the April 2014 execution of Liu Yen-kuo as ordered by Justice Minister Luo Ying-shay, Lee began review of the case, as he suspected a violation of due process.
