= Chuang Ming-yao =

Taiwanese admiral, diplomat, and politician

- 莊銘耀
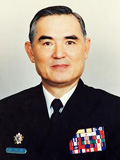

Secretary-General of the National Security Council
- In office 20 May 2000 – 16 August 2001
- Preceded by: Yin Tsung-wen
- Succeeded by: Ting Yu-chou

ROC Representative to Japan
- In office 20 May 1996 – 22 December 1999
- Preceded by: Lin Chin-ching
- Succeeded by: Lo Fu-chen

Commander of the Republic of China Navy
- In office 1 May 1992 – 16 April 1994
- Preceded by: Yeh Chang-tung
- Succeeded by: Nelson Ku

Vice Minister of National Defense
- In office June 1991 – 30 April 1992
- Minister: Chen Li-an
- Preceded by: Chen Shou-shan
- Succeeded by: Wang Tou-chih

Personal details
- Born: 16 November 1929 Takao, Takao Prefecture, Taiwan, Empire of Japan
- Died: 6 January 2002 (aged 72) Taipei, Taiwan
- Occupation: Politician

Military service
- Allegiance: Republic of China
- Branch/service: Republic of China Navy
- Years of service: 1941–1996
- Rank: Admiral

Chuang Ming-yao (Chinese: 莊銘耀; 16 November 1929 – 6 January 2002) was a Taiwanese admiral, diplomat, and politician.

Chuang served as the Vice Minister of National Defense under Chen Li-an and was named commander of the Republic of China Navy in 1992. He stepped down from that position in 1994 as a result of the La Fayette-class frigate scandal. Two years later, Chuang was selected to lead the Taipei Economic and Cultural Representative Office in Japan. In May 2000, he was named the Secretary-General of the National Security Council.

He died in 2002 of liver cancer at the age of 72, while being treated at Taipei Veterans General Hospital.
