= Tang Yao-ming =

Military personnel from Taiwan (1940–2021)

- 湯曜明
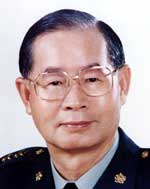

23rd Minister of National Defense of the Republic of China
- In office 1 February 2002 – 19 May 2004
- Deputy: Chen Chao-min; Kang Ning-hsiang; Lin Chong-pin
- Preceded by: Wu Shih-wen
- Succeeded by: Lee Jye

17th Chief of the General Staff of the Republic of China Armed Forces
- In office 1 February 1999 – 31 January 2002
- Preceded by: Tang Fei
- Succeeded by: Lee Jye

Personal details
- Born: 29 November 1940 Muhō, Daiton, Taichū, Taiwan, Empire of Japan (today Wufeng, Taichung, Taiwan)
- Died: 3 November 2021 (aged 80) Neihu, Taipei, Taiwan
- Party: Kuomintang

Tang Yao-ming (traditional Chinese: 湯曜明; simplified Chinese: 汤曜明; pinyin: Tāng Yàomíng; 29 November 1940 – 3 November 2021) was a Taiwanese general officer. He was the Minister of National Defense of the Republic of China (ROC) from 2002 to 2004.

== Ministry of National Defense ==
Tang was named to the position of defense minister on 20 January 2002, making him the first person born on the island of Taiwan to have held the post.

=== 2002 United States visit ===
In 2002, Tang visited St. Petersburg, Florida, United States to attend the U.S.-Taiwan Defense summit, making him the first ROC Minister of National Defense to visit the United States after the U.S. government ended official relations with Taiwan in 1979.

== Death ==
Tang died, aged 80, on 3 November 2021, at the Tri-Service General Hospital.
