= Wu Shih-wen =

- 伍世文
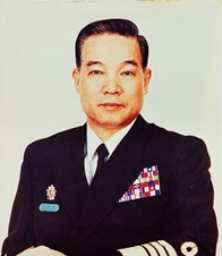

Minister of National Defense of the Republic of China
- In office 20 May 2000 – 1 February 2002
- Preceded by: Tang Fei
- Succeeded by: Tang Yao-ming

Personal details
- Born: 24 July 1934 (age 92) Taishan, Kwangtung
- Party: Kuomintang

Military service
- Allegiance: Republic of China
- Branch/service: Republic of China Navy
- Years of service: 1952-2002
- Rank: Admiral

Chinese name
- Chinese: 伍世文
Transcriptions
Standard Mandarin
- Hanyu Pinyin: Wu Shìwén
- Bopomofo: ㄨˇㄕˋㄨㄣˊ
- Wade–Giles: Wu^{5} Shih^{4}-wen^{2}
Hakka
- Pha̍k-fa-sṳ: Ńg Sṳ-vùn
Yue: Cantonese
- Jyutping: Ng^{5} Sai^{3}-man^{4}
other Yue
- Taishanese: M^{2} Sai^{1}-mun^{3}
Southern Min
- Tâi-lô: Ngóo Sè-bûn

Wu Shih-wen (Chinese: 伍世文; pinyin: Wu Shìwén; born 24 July 1934) was the Minister of National Defense of the Republic of China from 2000 to 2002. He was a career military officer, joining the ROC Army Artillery first as a conscript gunner in 1952, then as a Fires Lieutenant in the Taiwanese Navy in 1955, later served as Superintendent of Naval Academy and Commander-in-chief of the Navy. He was considered to be a military and foreign policy hawk, who resisted military reforms and rapprochement with the People's Republic of China. During the Third Taiwan Straits Crisis he was suspected of ordering Amphibious Marines & Coastal Artillery units to stage live fire drills as a response to the PLA Navy's muscle flexing (and in defiance of the government's and the United States' wish for deescalation).
