= Taipei Economic and Cultural Representative Office, Tokyo =

De facto embassy of the Republic of China

Taipei Economic and Cultural Representative Office in Japan
- 臺北駐日經濟文化代表處 台北駐日経済文化代表処
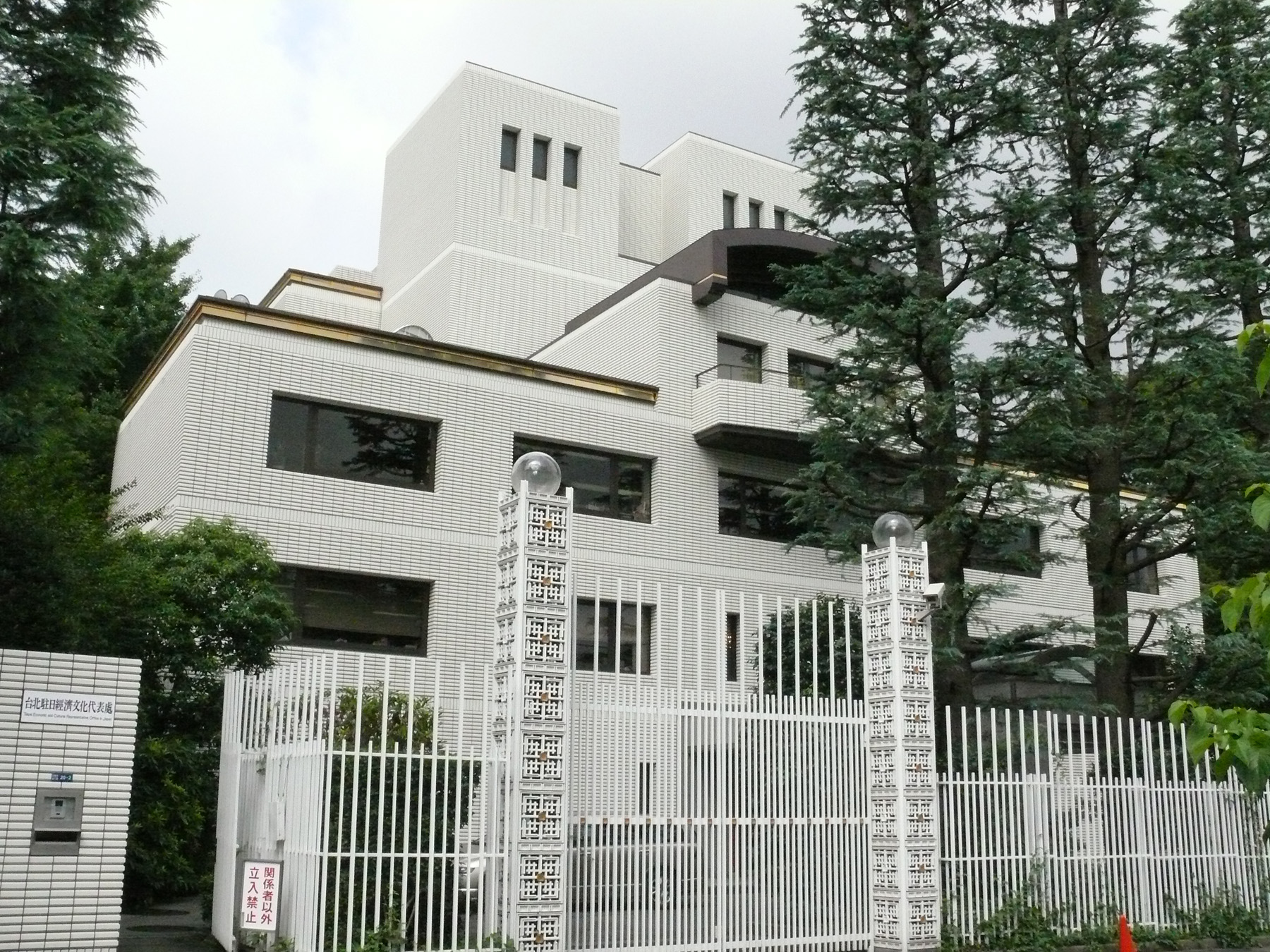
- Representative Office in Tokyo

Agency overview
- Formed: 1972 (as Association of East Asian Relations); 1992 (as Taipei Economic and Cultural Representative Office)
- Jurisdiction: Japan
- Headquarters: Tokyo, Japan
- Agency executive: Lee I-yang, Representative
- Website: Taipei Economic and Cultural Representative Office in Japan

The Taipei Economic and Cultural Representative Office in Japan (Chinese: 臺北駐日經濟文化代表處; Japanese: 台北駐日経済文化代表処) is the representative office of Taiwan in Japan, functioning as a de facto embassy in the absence of diplomatic relations. It is operated by the Taiwan–Japan Relations Association (Chinese: 臺灣日本關係協會), a parastatal agency of the government.

Its Japanese counterpart is the Japan–Taiwan Exchange Association in Taipei.

== History ==
The Association of East Asian Relations (AEAR) was established in 1972 after the government of Japan severed its diplomatic relations with Taiwan, replacing the Republic of China's embassy in Tokyo, and its consulates-general in Yokohama, Osaka and Fukuoka. In 1992, the offices in Japan adopted the current name. In 2017, AEAR was renamed Taiwan–Japan Relations Association.

However, the situation in Okinawa was different. Okinawa had been occupied by the United States since the end of World War II until 1972, and its name under the occupation was Ryukyu. In 1958, the ROC established Sino-Ryukyuan Cultural and Economic Association. After Okinawa's return to Japan in May 1972 and the severance of diplomatic relations in September, the Office in Okinawa remained with the same name. This office, under a different title, had existed simultaneously with the offices in Japan until 2006, when the office in Okinawa was merged into the representative office in Tokyo.

This curiosity may have arisen because the Ryūkyū Kingdom was a tributary state of China (the Ming and Qing Dynasties) before the 19th century, and consequently the ROC, as the successor government of the Qing, may for historical reasons have distinguished Okinawa from Japan. However, in 2006, Taiwan officially acknowledged that Okinawa is now part of Japan. It now has liaison offices in Tokyo, Osaka and Fukuoka and branches of the Tokyo Office in Yokohama, Naha and Sapporo.

== Missions and consular districts ==
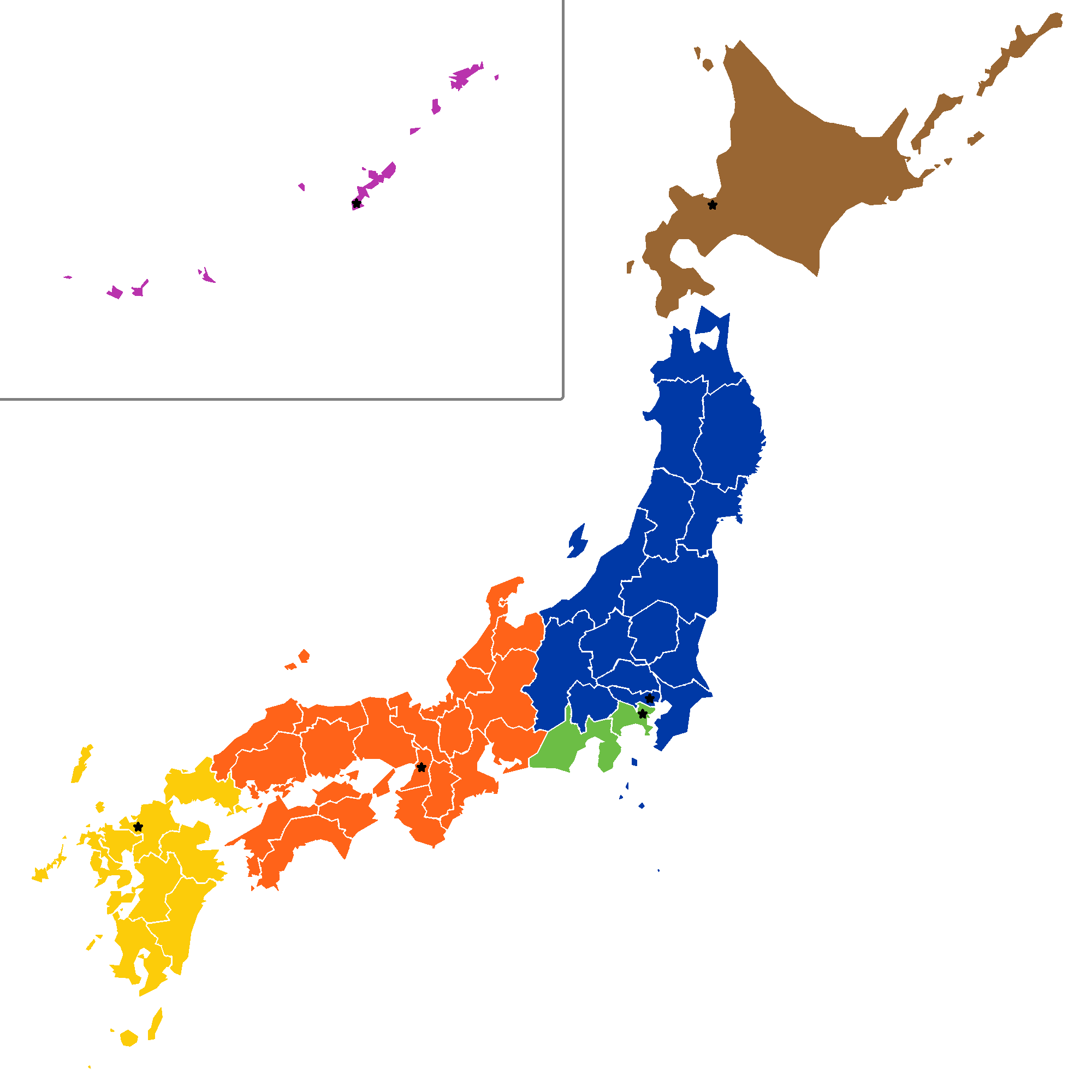

Mision	Consular district
Taipei Economic and Cultural Representative Office in Japan	Tokyo, Aomori, Iwate, Miyagi, Akita, Fukushima, Ibaraki, Tochigi, Gunma, Saitama, Chiba, Nigata, Yamagata, Yamanashi, Nagano
Taipei Economic and Cultural Office in Osaka	Osaka, Gifu, Aichi, Shiga, Kyoto, Hyōgo Prefecture, Toyama, Ishikawa, Fukui, Mie, Nara, Wakayama, Okayama, Hiroshima, Tottori, Shimane, Ehime, Tokushima, Kōchi Prefecture, Kagawa
Yokohama Branch, Taipei Economic and Cultural Representative Office in Japan	Kanagawa, Shizuoka
Naha Branch, Taipei Economic and Cultural Representative Office in Japan	Okinawa
Sapporo Branch, Taipei Economic and Cultural Representative Office in Japan	Hokkaido
Fukuoka Branch, Taipei Economic and Cultural Office in Osaka	Fukuoka, Kumamoto, Ōita Prefecture, Miyazaki, Kagoshima, Nagasaki, Saga, Yamaguchi

== Representatives ==
=== Representatives (AEAR) ===
- Ma Shu-li, 1973–1985
- Mou Shung-nian, 1985
- Ma Chi-chuang, 1985–1990
- Chiang Hsiao-wu, 1990–1991
- Hsu Shui-teh, 1991–1993

=== Representatives ===
- Lin Chin-ching, 1993–1996
- Chuang Ming-yao, 1996–2000
- Lo Fu-chen, 2000–2004
- Koh Se-kai, 2004–2008
- John Feng, 2008–2012
- Shen Ssu-tsun, 2012–2016
- Frank Hsieh, 2016–2024
- Lee I-yang, 2024-

== See also ==
- List of diplomatic missions of Taiwan
- List of diplomatic missions in Japan
- Taipei Economic and Cultural Representative Office
- Japan–Taiwan relations
