= Chinatowns in Asia =

Chinatown
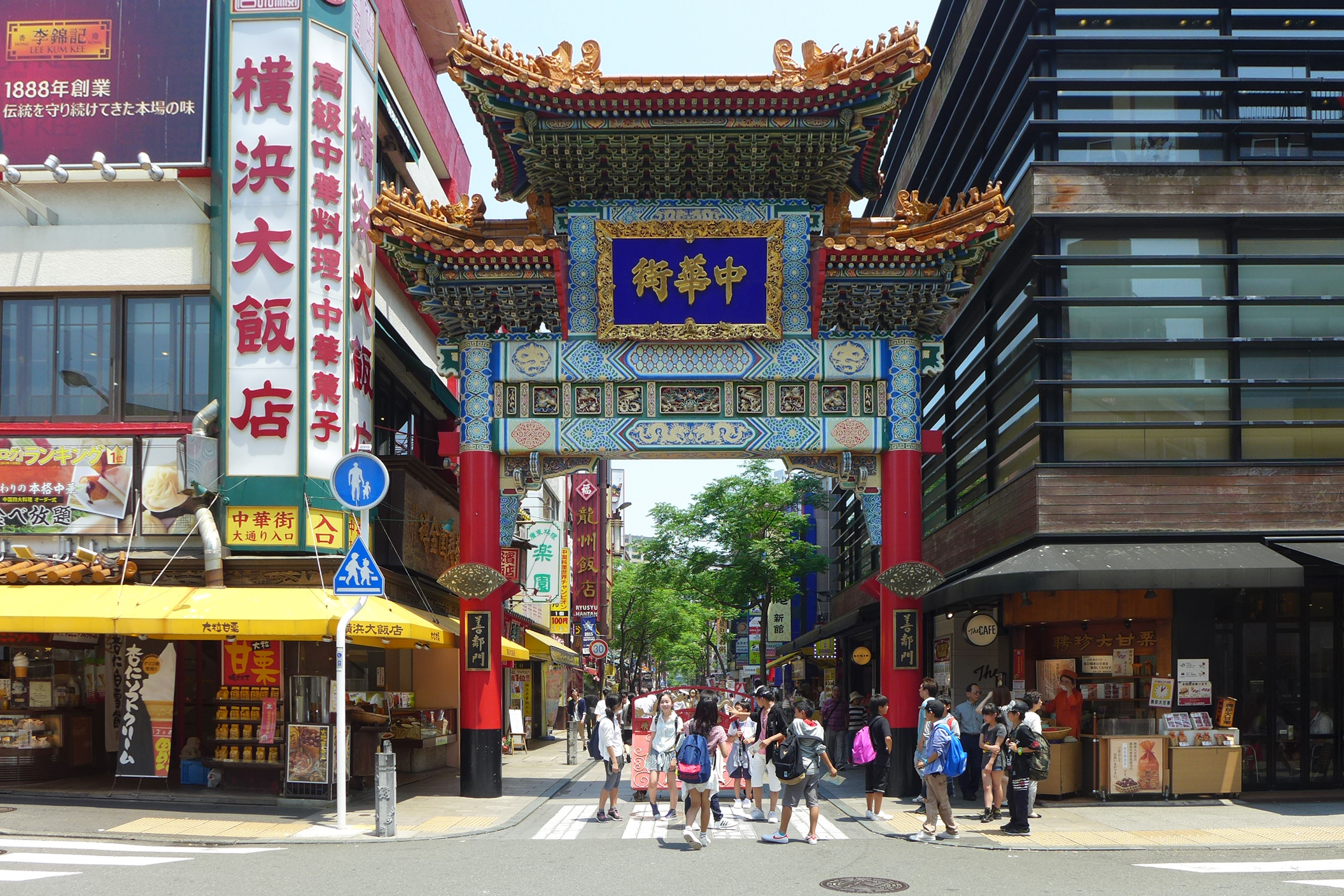
- Yokohama Chinatown
- Chinese: 唐人街
- Hakka: Tongˇ nginˇ gieˊ
Transcriptions
Standard Mandarin
- Hanyu Pinyin: Tángrénjiē
Hakka
- Romanization: Tongˇ nginˇ gieˊ
Yue: Cantonese
- Yale Romanization: Tòhngyàhngāai

Alternative Chinese name
- Traditional Chinese: 中國城
- Simplified Chinese: 中国城
- Hakka: Zungˊ guedˋ sangˇ
Transcriptions
Standard Mandarin
- Hanyu Pinyin: Zhōngguóchéng
Hakka
- Romanization: Zungˊ guedˋ sangˇ
Yue: Cantonese
- Yale Romanization: Jūnggwoksìhng

Second alternative Chinese name
- Traditional Chinese: 華埠
- Simplified Chinese: 华埠
- Hakka: Faˇ pu
Transcriptions
Standard Mandarin
- Hanyu Pinyin: Huábù
Hakka
- Romanization: Faˇ pu

Chinatowns in Asia are widespread with large concentrations of overseas Chinese in East Asia and Southeast Asia, and ethnic Chinese whose ancestors came from southern China—particularly the provinces of Guangdong, Fujian, and Hainan—and settled in countries such as Brunei, Cambodia, East Timor, Indonesia, India, Laos, Malaysia, Myanmar, the Philippines, Singapore, Sri Lanka, Thailand, Vietnam, Japan and Korea centuries ago—starting as early as the Tang dynasty, but mostly notably in the 17th–19th centuries (during the reign of the Qing dynasty), and well into the 20th century. Today the Chinese diaspora in Asia is primarily concentrated in Southeast Asia; however, the legacy of the once widespread overseas Chinese communities in Asia is evident in the many Chinatowns found across East, South and Southeast Asia.

These ethnic Chinese often arrived from southern mainland China. They were mainly Chinese people of Cantonese (Vietnam, Cambodia, Singapore, Thailand, Malaysia), Hakka (India, Cambodia, Sri Lanka, Malaysia, Singapore, Indonesia, Thailand, Myanmar, Brunei), Hokkien (Philippines, Singapore, Malaysia, Indonesia, Cambodia, Myanmar), and Teochew/Chaozhou (Cambodia, Laos, Thailand, Vietnam, Singapore, Malaysia, Indonesia) origin and less often of Hainanese, Hokchew and Henghwa origin in some countries.

Binondo, located in Manila, Philippines, is considered by many to be the oldest existing Chinatown in the world, having been officially established in 1594 by the Spanish colonial government in the Philippines as a permanent settlement for Chinese who had converted to Christianity. A separate area, called the Parian, was allotted for unconverted Chinese.

Chợ Lớn, located in Ho Chi Minh City (formerly Saigon), Vietnam, is the largest Chinatown in the world and dates back to the late 18th century.

Ethnic Chinese represent a large minority population in most of these countries—with Singapore being the exception, where Chinese-origin Singaporeans form the majority of the population. Chinese Indonesians and Chinese Filipinos have adapted to Indonesian and Filipino ways. The Thai Chinese and Chinese Cambodian people have generally assimilated into the larger Thai and Cambodian population.

== Origin of Chinatowns in Asia ==
Historically, Southeast Asia, South Asia, and to some extent East Asia have been areas of overseas Chinese migration within Asia. In the 18th and 19th century there were waves of Chinese migration to other parts of Asia, primarily in Southeast Asia. As a result of this migration, Chinatowns emerged in areas with high amounts of Chinese migrants.

== Specific Asian Chinatowns ==
=== Afghanistan ===
In the Taimani area of the capital Kabul, there is an office building named China Town, with spaces for Chinese traders and merchants, as well as a small market.

=== Bangladesh ===
Nalchity in Barisal Division had already attained prominence as the principal commercial hub of the region. Contemporary accounts and subsequent scholarly assessments indicate that the area witnessed a steady influx of foreign merchants from diverse lands, reflecting its importance within wider networks of trade. Notably, Chinese traders are understood to have played a significant role in the commerce of salt and betel nut in this locality. Material and toponymic traces of their presence are commonly identified by researchers in the present-day China Bazar of Nalchiti and in the Chinese grave situated near the bus stand.

=== Cambodia ===
Cambodia started to contact China as early as the 1st century CE, but it was only until the 19th century that many Chinese started to immigrate to Cambodia. Most Chinese settlers in Cambodia are Teochew people, followed by some Cantonese, Hokkien, and Hakka.

In the late 19th century, during the reign of Luong Preah Norodom, a plot of land along the riverside, north of the royal palace (Psar Chas) in Phnom Penh, was gifted to the Chinese immigrants. This became Phnom Penh Chinatown. The settlement gradually grew and expanded. However, after the Khmer Rouge, Chinatown was reduced to the areas around Orussey Market and Central Market. It also lies on Charles de Gaulle Street, Kampuchea Krom Boulevard (west of Central Market), Monivong Boulevard, and Street 166.

Phnom Penh Chinatown is known for its Chinese cuisine, including grilled squids, tea eggs, lamina mee, and stir fry. There are also other businesses such as Feng Shui services and herbal shops.

Phnom Penh Chinatown is also the site of many Chinese festival celebrations. The most prominent of which being Chinese New Year but also the Spirit Parade Day, the Moon Cake Festival, and the Dragon Boat Festival.

=== East Timor ===
Dili, the capital of East Timor, has a Chinatown business area on Hudilaran Street.

=== India ===
Most of the Chinese community in Kolkata live in or near Tiretta Bazaar, the local Chinatown. Many Hakkas live in a community known as Tangra, which used to be dominated by leather tanneries (the Hindu majority will not touch cattle) and Chinese restaurants. As of 2004, there were roughly 7,000 people of Chinese origin in Tangra, but the population was as high as 20,000. The population decline has been attributed to increased pollution regulations on tanneries and the immigration of younger generations to countries such as Australia, Canada, and the United States for better economic opportunities.

Another Chinatown is in Byculla, Mumbai. However, it has diminished in population as many of its Indian-born Chinese ethnic residents were denied Indian passports, a backlash from the 1962 Indo-China war.

=== Indonesia ===
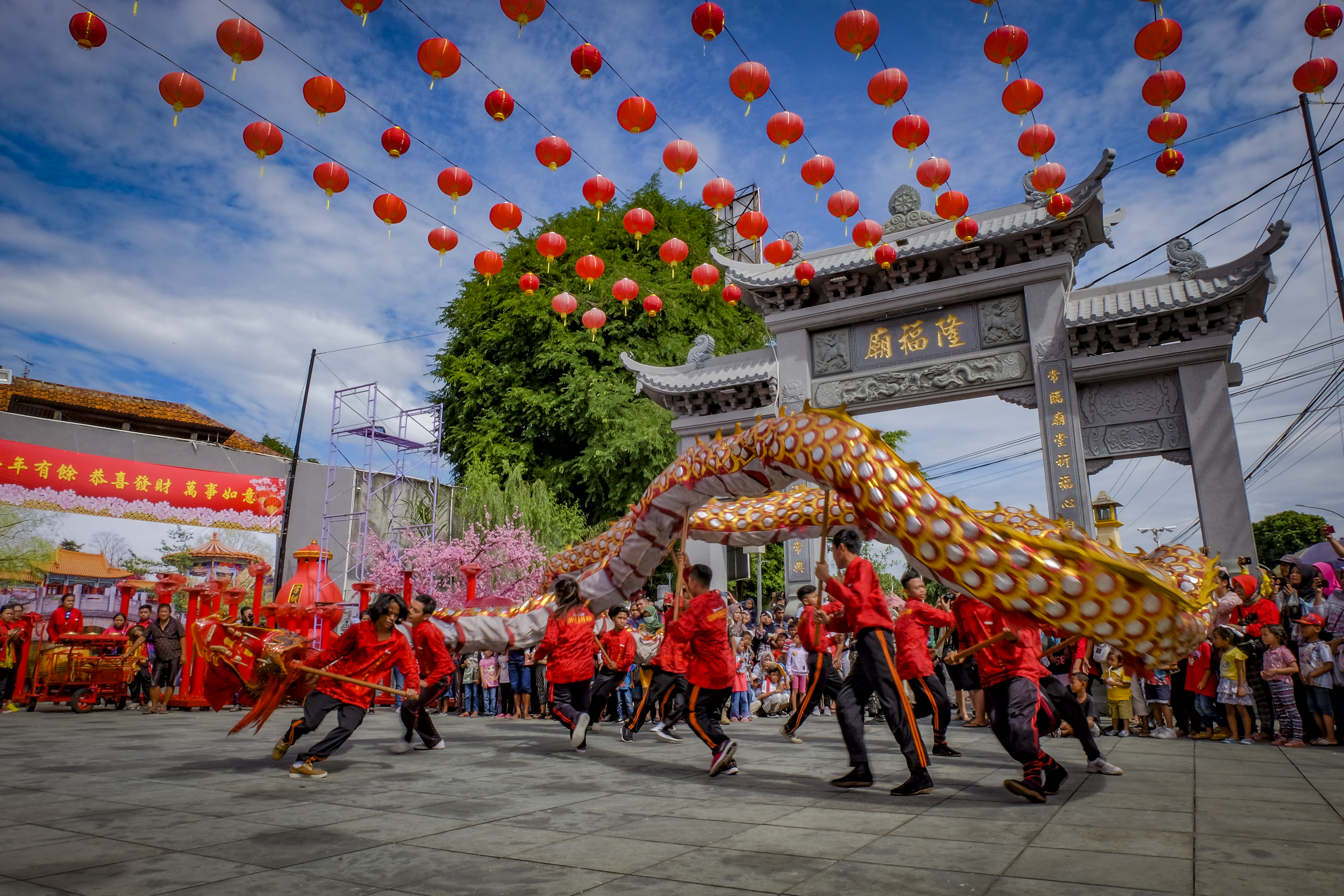
Dragon dance attraction in Glodok, Jakarta.

In Indonesia, many Chinese reside within the Major cities and towns of Java, Sumatra, Sulawesi, Borneo and the Moluccas. There is also a sizeable Chinese population in small towns and villages across Sumatra and Borneo. In Java, especially in Jakarta, Chinese people reside in the northern, central and the western part of the province, such as Glodok, Mangga Dua, Pinangsia, Kelapa Gading, Grogol, Pantai Indah Kapuk, and Pluit. Other Chinatowns in Java are located in the Tangerang city center; Suryakencana Street in Bogor, West Java; Jalan Pekojan in Semarang; Lasem in Central Java; Kampung Ketandan in Yogyakarta; Kya-Kya in Surabaya; Kampung Balong in Surakarta; Jalan Kyai Tamin and Pasar Besar in Malang; Jalan Pemuda in Magelang; Pakelan in Kediri; Jalan Karyawan baru in Mojokerto; Keplekan Kidul and Jalan Blimbing in Pekalongan; Jalan Gajah Mada in Sidoarjo; and Jalan Veteran in Tegal.

As for Sumatra and Borneo, many cities and towns have significant Chinese populations that can be found dispersed in and around the city. Those are:

- Bangka Belitung – Pangkal Pinang, Sungailiat, Tanjung Pandan, Manggar, Toboali and Muntok (with Hakka majority)
- North Sumatra – Medan (Kesawan), Binjai, Lubuk Pakam, Pematangsiantar, Rantau Prapat, Tanjungbalai, Tebing Tinggi, Sibolga (with Hokkien majority)
- Riau – Pekanbaru, Dumai, Selat Panjang, Bagansiapiapi, Panipahan, Bagan Batu (with Hokkien majority)
- Riau Islands – Batam, Tanjung Pinang, Tanjung Balai Karimun (with Hokkien majority)
- South Sumatra – Palembang (with Hakka and Cantonese majority)
- West Kalimantan – Pontianak, Ketapang, and Bengkayang (with Teochew majority) and Singkawang (with Hakka majority)

"Chinatown" in Indonesian is known as Pecinan or Kampung Cina.

=== Japan ===
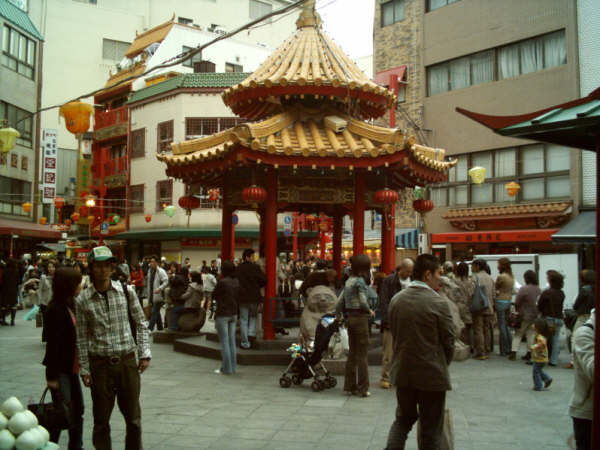
Chinatown in Kobe, Japan.

In Japan, ethnic Chinese immigrants are called kakyō. The largest Chinatown in Asia and one of the largest in the world is located in Yokohama and the city of Kobe has a growing Chinatown. Nagasaki's Chinatown (Japanese: Shinchimachi, 新地町) was founded in 1698 AD. Most Chinese immigrants in Japan were from Taiwan who arrived during the Japanese colonial period.

Tokyo's Ikebukuro district is home to many ethnic Chinese who arrived in the 1980s. Though in Tokyo, this Chinatown is relatively small and unannounced compared to Yokohama's Chinatown just to the south of the city.

=== Laos ===
Vientiane contains a Chinatown on Samsenthai Road.

=== Malaysia ===
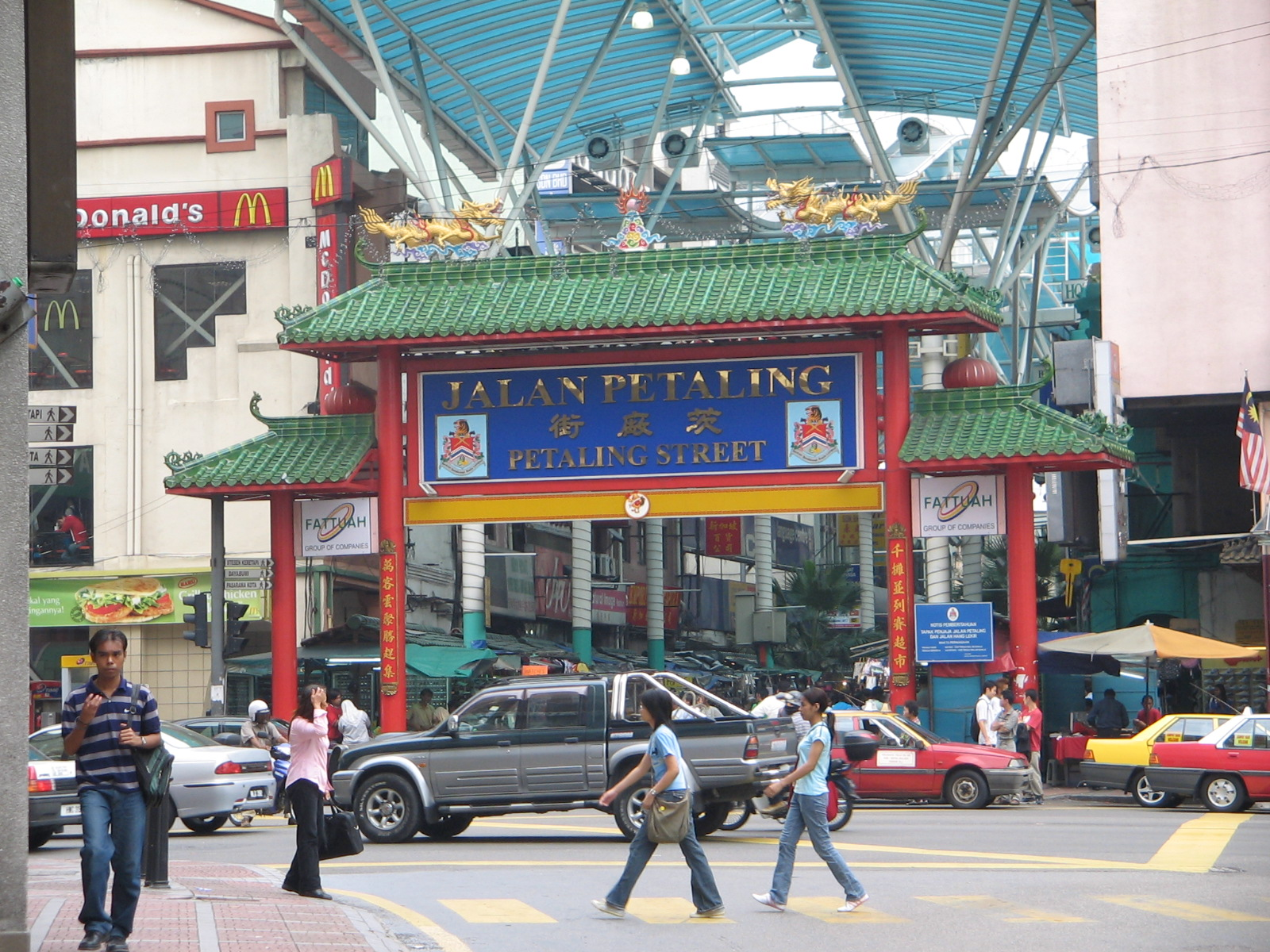
Petaling Street (local Cantonese: chi cheong kai), Kuala Lumpur

With around a quarter of the Malaysian population of Chinese origin, urban districts with a large concentration of ethnic Chinese are to be found across the country. The term Chinatown is rarely used to refer to such places locally except for tourism purposes—particularly about Petaling Street, the center of Kuala Lumpur's Chinese business district and is predominantly Cantonese-speaking.

In the northern Malaysia, the population of Georgetown on the island of Penang is essentially Hokkien-speaking, and close to 90% of the population is of Chinese origin. Other urban areas with a high proportion of Chinese people in the city center include Kuching (90%), Ipoh (82%), Kota Kinabalu (78%), and Malacca (62%).

In the East Coast region of Malaysia, the city of Kuala Terengganu has an old Chinese settlement known as Kampung Cina. This area, located at the river mouth of Terengganu River that empties into the South China Sea, is one of Southeast Asia's early Chinese settlements (with many of the current buildings dating back to the late 1800s and early 1900s) and contains stately ancestral homes, temples, townhouses, and businesses. It is a significant area to the city's Chinese community and culture, with many heritage buildings. Kampung Cina is also a significant tourist attraction in Kuala Terengganu.

=== Myanmar ===
The primary Chinatown in Myanmar is situated in Downtown Yangon within the Lanmadaw township and Latha township. Other Chinatowns exist in Myanmar's major cities, such as Mandalay.

The Kokang Chinese is another significant group in northern Shan State who make up 30–40% of the total Chinese Burmese population. Kokang was founded in 1739 as the Chiefdom of Kokang and became populated by Ming loyalists during the rise of the Qing dynasty. Kokang today is a self-administered zone with a 90% Han Chinese population.

=== Pakistan ===
There is a sizeable community of Chinese people in Pakistan, mainly concentrated in urban centers. The areas of Clifton and DHA in Karachi have many Chinese restaurants and businesses and are sometimes dubbed as Chinatown.

=== Philippines ===
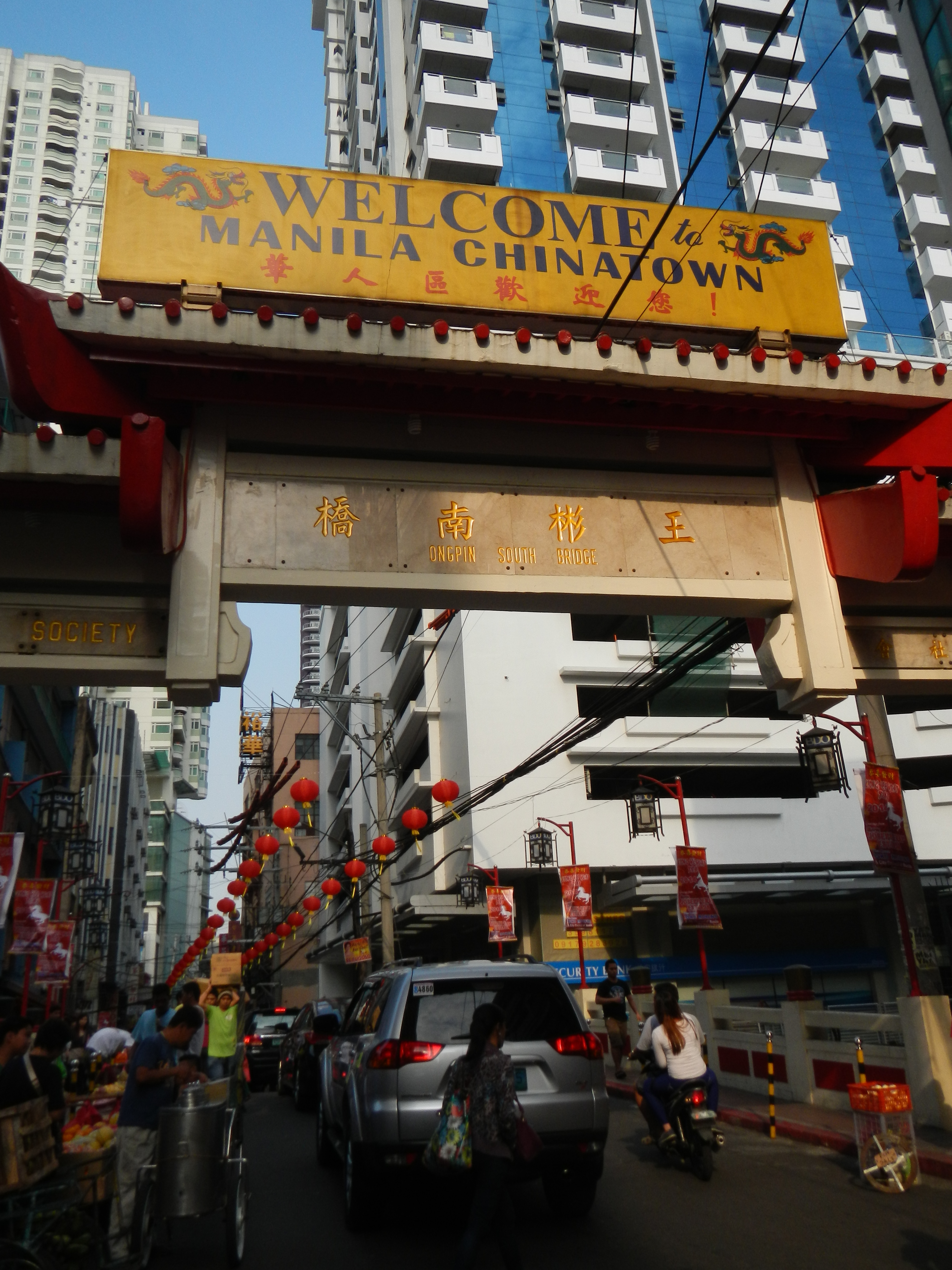
Welcome Arch to the Manila Chinatown

The best-known Chinatown in the Philippines is the district of Binondo in Manila. Binondo is the oldest Chinatown in the world, having been established in 1594, when the Spanish colonial government of the Philippine islands restricted the residence of Chinese who had converted to Christianity to this area. Unconverted Christians were allotted a different enclave, then called the Parian, which is no longer in existence as a Chinatown.

Many prominent Chinese Filipino families have roots in this district. Among the attractions of Binondo is Divisoria, a shopping area popular for bargain shopping.

Chinese settlement—predominantly Hokkien—in the Philippines pre-dates the arrival of the Spanish in 1521. Chinese merchants have been trading with the indigenous tribes of the islands since the 8th century. During Spanish colonial rule, the Chinese were intermediate in Filipino society as middlemen between the Spanish upper class and the native Filipinos.

During the rule of Ferdinand Marcos, bitterness against Chinese Filipinos grew, starting in 1972. Many of the community went to Venezuela, North America, Australia, among other countries. In the first-ever visit to Manila's Chinatown by a Filipino president, President Gloria Macapagal Arroyo, who is of part Chinese descent herself, recognized the efforts and contributions of Chinese Filipinos.

In 2006, plans were drawn up to construct a newer but synthetic Chinatown in shopping-mall form along Diosdado Macapagal Boulevard in the Manila Bay area of Manila, which would rival the nearly-400-year-old original Chinatown in the Binondo district. It was to be dubbed "Neo Chinatown" and designed based on traditional Chinese architecture. It was to be a joint venture of local Chinese Filipino and Mainland Chinese investors. Neo Chinatown sought to replicate the vibrant night market scene found on the streets of Hong Kong and Taipei.

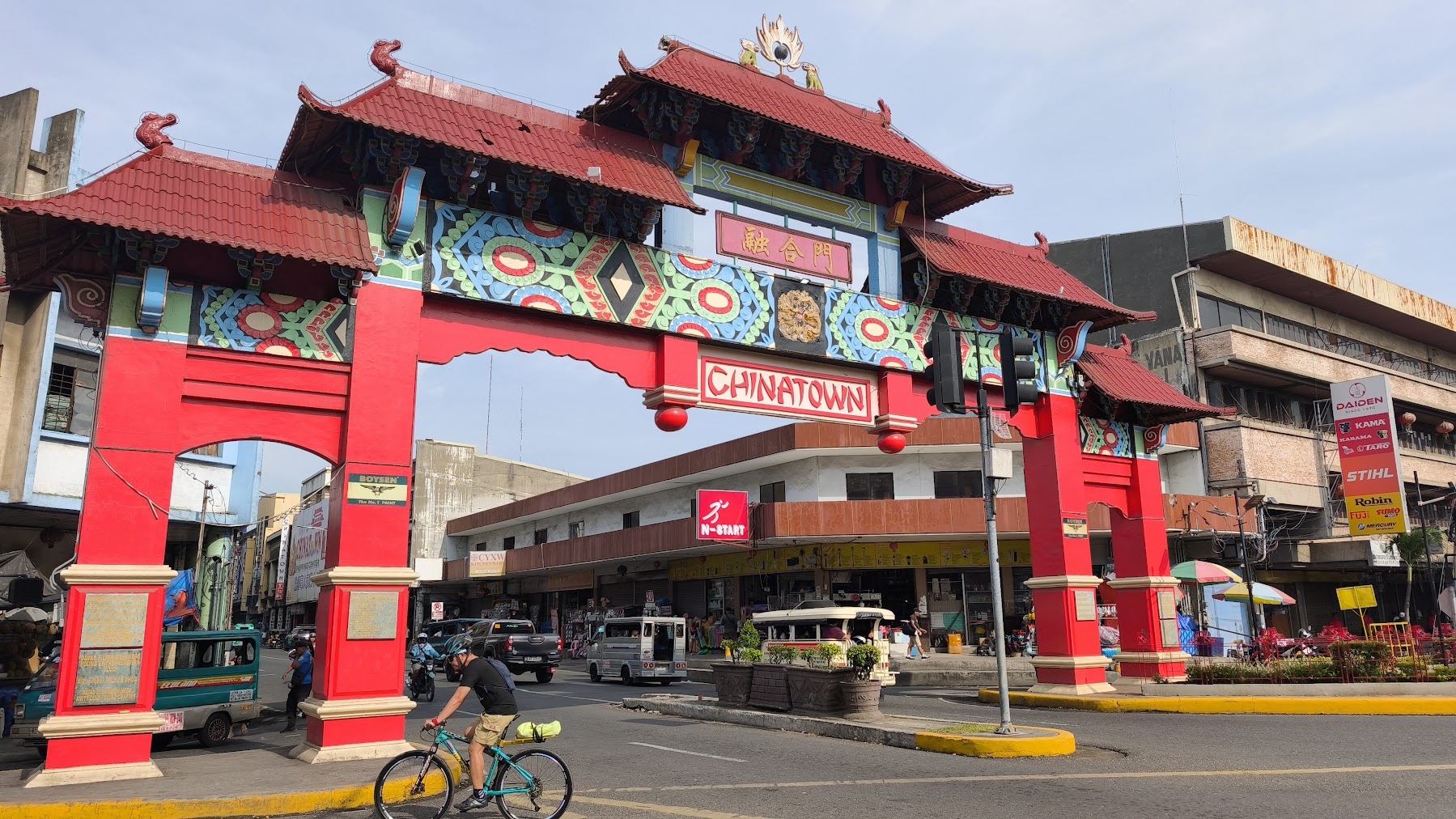
Davao City's Chinatown is said to be the Philippines' most giant in terms of land area. August 2026 image

Davao Chinatown, also known as Mindanao Chinatown, is the only Chinatown in Mindanao, located in Davao City.

=== Singapore ===
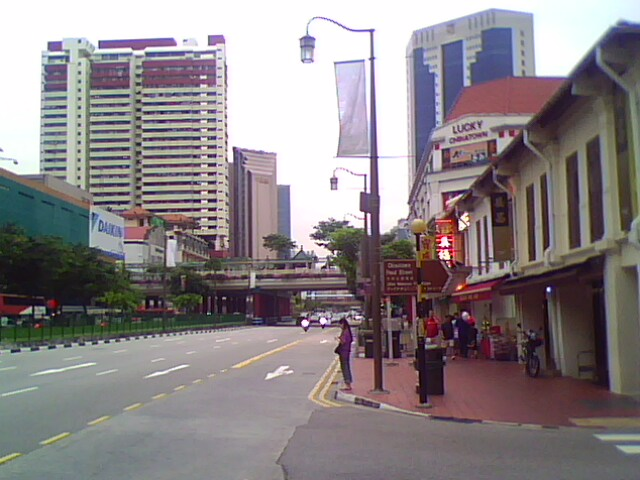
Chinatown in Singapore.

Singapore, a multi-racial but predominantly Chinese country, has a relatively large Chinatown in a district to the south of the river initially designated for Chinese settlement by Sir Stamford Raffles. It remains known as Chinatown in English, and Niú chē shuǐ (牛车水, lit. 'ox cart water') in Chinese, and the Mass Rapid Transit (MRT) station that serves the area is known by both names. The area around the station serves as a tourist attraction selling souvenirs, and also locally frequented areas including several traditional stores, markets, restaurants, apartment complexes, nightclubs, and Chinese temples, including the Buddha Tooth Relic temple, and the Thian Hock Keng Temple. Festival markets are also set up in the area during special events in the Lunar calendar, such as the Chinese New Year or the Mid-Autumn Festival.

Chinatown is not exclusively Chinese; the Masjid Jamae and the Sri Mariamman Hindu Temple can also be found off the main street.

In 1989, several areas in Chinatown were earmarked by the Urban Redevelopment Authority as historical conservation areas. Under that program, the historic streets of Kreta Ayer Road, Telok Ayer Street, Ann Siang Hill, and Bukit Pasoh Road were restored. Because of its proximity to the administrative center and the central business district, specialized professional and consultancy businesses, and upmarket retail and dining establishments, have displaced many traditional companies in the historical shophouses in Chinatown.

=== South Korea ===
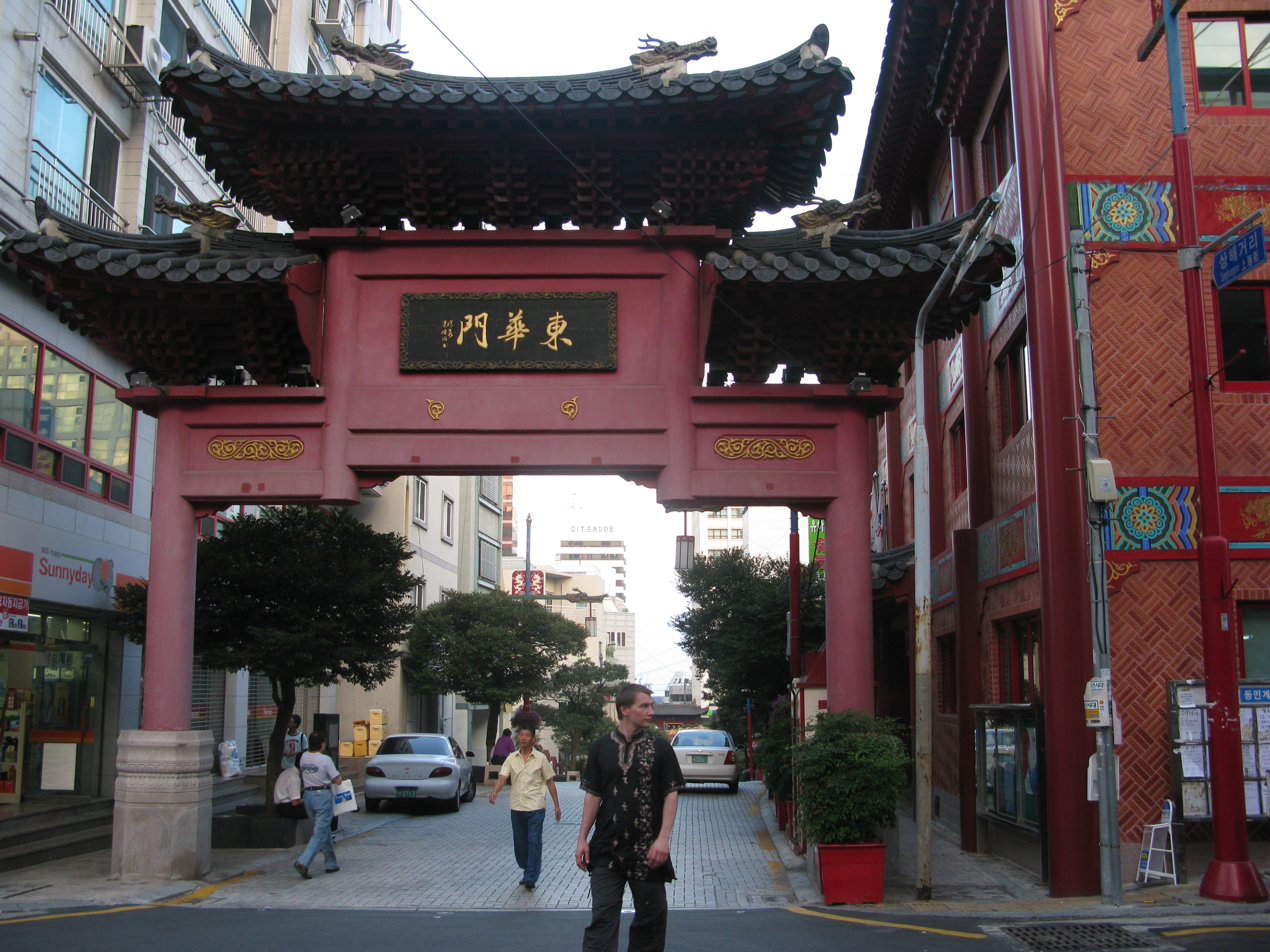
The gate of Busan's Chinatown, located in Choryang-dong, Dong-gu

South Korea's Chinatowns are located in Incheon and Seoul. Seoul's Chinatown is unofficial. A newly planned Chinatown was built in suburban Goyang (Ilsan) in 2005.

Incheon's Chinatown is Korea's only official Chinatown. It is in Jung-gu and was formed in 1884. It used to be the largest Chinatown in South Korea before the departure of the Chinese from the county. In 2002, to capitalize on the large number of mainland Chinese visitors visiting South Korea, the Incheon city council planned to revive its moribund Chinatown for US$6.2 million (worth about 6.5 billion South Korean won). It claims to be the largest Chinatown in South Korea and features an 11-metre-high Chinese-style gateway.

Busan is also considering reviving its Chinatown.

Due to institutionalized anti-Chinese discrimination during the Park Chung Hee administration and lack of economic opportunities, many ethnic Chinese left South Korea during the 1960s and 1970s for Taiwan or the United States. Since then the actual Chinese populations of many Chinatowns in South Korea declined. Ethnic Koreans own many businesses in these Chinatowns.

=== Thailand ===
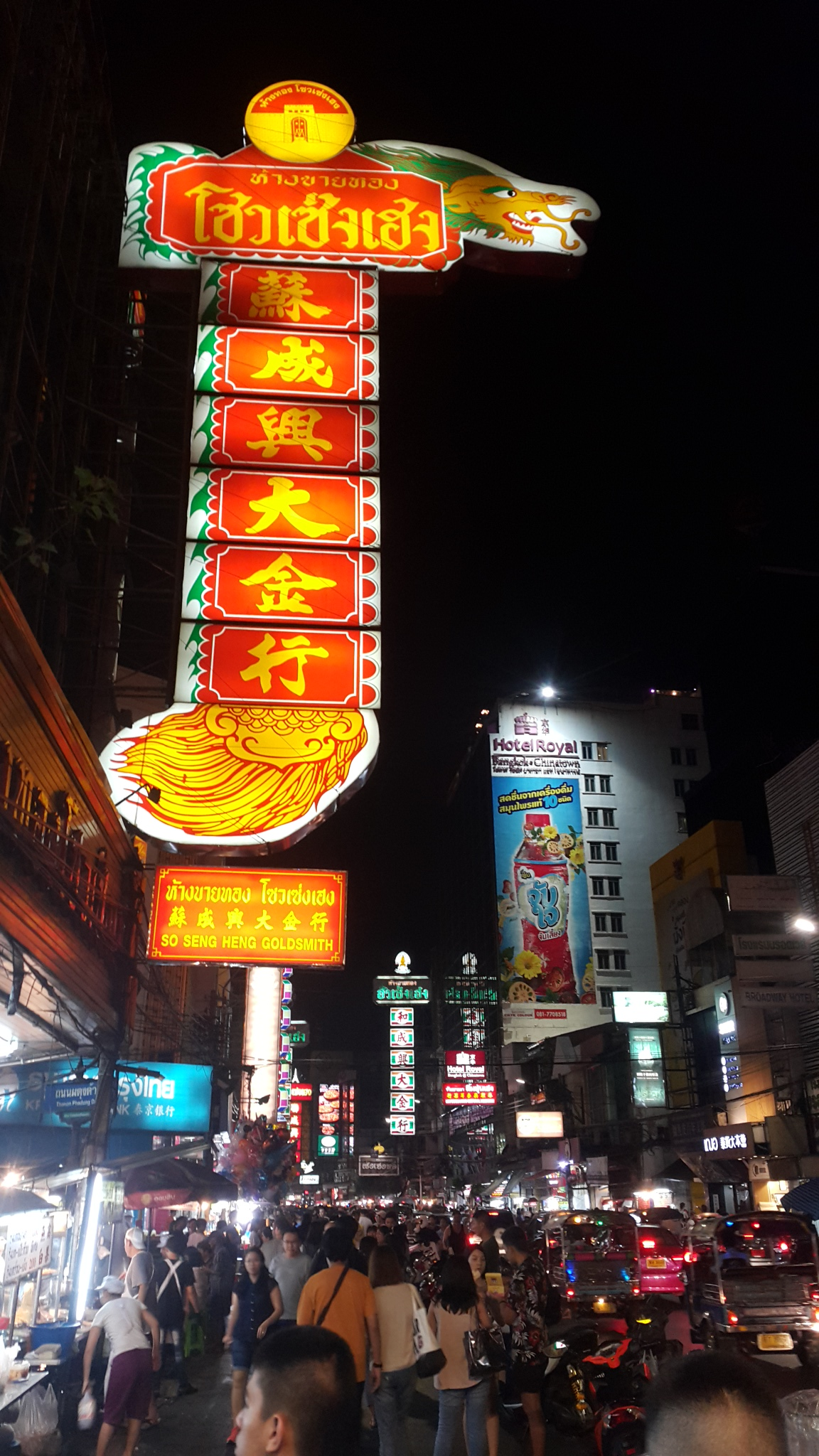
Sign of a goldsmith in Yaowarat Bangkok's biggest Chinatown

Chinese Thais of Teochew (Chaozhou) descent are the dominant group of ethnic Chinese, with smaller numbers of those of Cantonese and Hakka origin as well. Rama, I was the founder and the first monarch of the reigning House of Chakri of Siam. His mother, Daoreung (original name Yok), was part-Chinese.

The Chinatown of Bangkok is located on Yaowarat Road and Sampeng Lane, including Huai Khwang District especially Pracha Rat Bamphen Road. It is considered the "New Chinatown" of modern Chinese such as students and tourists.

The city of Phuket is home to Thailand's second Chinatown, which is on Phang Nga Road, Thalang Road, Krabi Road, Phuket Road, Ratsada Road, Yaowarat Road, Deebook Road, and Thepkrasattree Road Phuket. Early Chinese settlers founded it.

There is a Chinese community in northern Thailand, in a town called Mae Salong, near Myanmar. After the defeat and exile of Kuomintang (KMT) from mainland China by forces led by Mao Zedong, several KMT army divisions in Yunnan Province fled into neighboring Myanmar. After being expelled from that country, the mainland Chinese veterans fought Thai communists on behalf of the Thai government and were granted citizenship. Veterans of the Kuomintang Army 93rd Division established Mae Salong. Many Thai-born Chinese generations have relocated to Taiwan, although their fathers and grandfathers refuse because of an owed apology from the KMT for refusing them in the 1950s and 1960s. They have since made a retirement home-styled town called "the home to the glorious people" (榮民之家). Today, Mae Salong is a spot for tourists from Taiwan and mainland China.

A shopping district in Chiang Mai city called Trok Lao Zhou has been dubbed the "Chinatown of Chiang Mai." It is a historic alleyway within Waroros Market (Kad Luang) that is of Chinese and Hmong origins.

The community of Chak Ngaeo in Bang Lamung District has been dubbed the "Chinatown of the East."

=== United Arab Emirates ===
There are approximately 180,000 Chinese people in the United Arab Emirates, 150,000 of whom are in Dubai. Many Chinese expatriates hail from the Wenzhou region.

In 2018, Emirati-based developer Emaar announced a project to build the Middle East's largest Chinatown in Dubai Creek Harbour. The plan coincided with the visit of China's paramount leader, Xi Jinping.

In Abu Dhabi, a small Chinatown exists in Madinat Zayed.

=== Vietnam ===
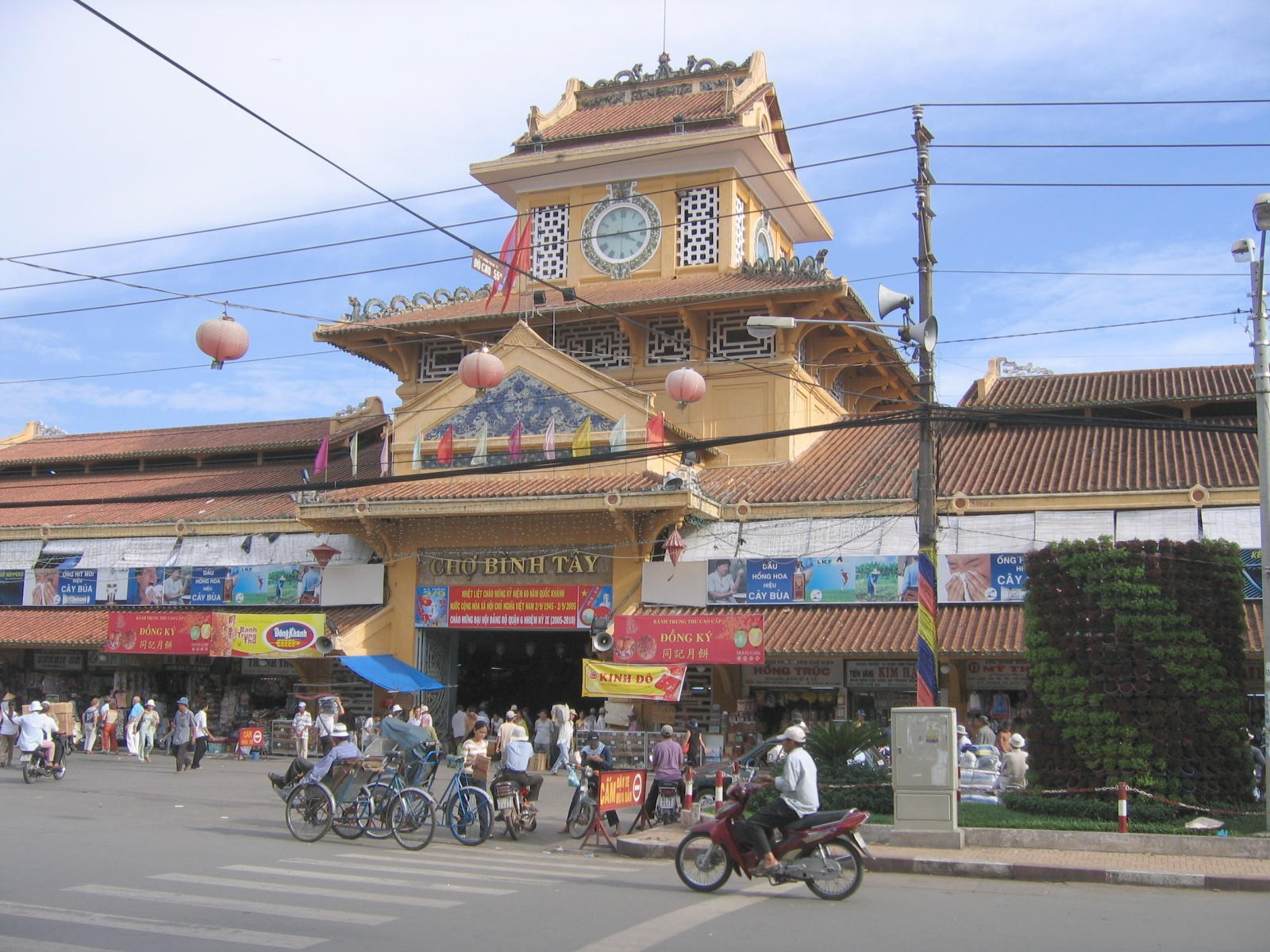
Bình Tây Market, the primary market in Chợ Lớn.

Ethnic Chinese have migrated to and lived in Vietnam for centuries. During the transition of power from the Ming dynasty to the Qing dynasty in China, many anti-Qing elements fled prosecution and came to Vietnam. To avoid angering the Qing government, the Vietnam government sent them south to populate the scarcely-populated area. They pioneered many settlements in the south of the country, including what was then referred to as Saigon, now Ho Chi Minh City.

Ho Chi Minh City's Chinatown is the Chợ Lớn ("Big Market") district, which has been a stronghold for the Chinese-Vietnamese community since the late 1770s when many Cantonese and Teochew Chinese arrived. Its main thoroughfares are Nguyễn Trãi Street and Trần Hưng Đạo Street. The Cholon area was the bastion of ethnic Chinese free enterprise, until the victorious communist government confiscated private property after the Vietnam War's conclusion in 1975.

During the prelude to the Sino-Vietnamese War, the Vietnamese government decided to expel the Sino-Vietnamese from the Northern part of the country, creating a second wave of boat people, many of whom returned to China. After the Sino-Vietnamese War's conclusion (the late 1970s and early 1980s), many Chinese Vietnamese (called in Vietnamese the Viet Hoa) along with their ethnic Vietnamese, or the Viet Kinh, compatriots fled the country as "boat people." However, this third wave was mostly ethnic Vietnamese. As a result, many overseas Chinese-Vietnamese communities were founded in Australia, Canada, France, Germany, and the United States. Nevertheless, Vietnam still has a remnant ethnic Chinese community.
