= Mangga Besar, Jakarta =

Coordinates: 6.145353°S 106.818575°E

Mangga Besar
- Administrative village
- Interactive map of Mangga Besar
- Country: Indonesia
- Province: Jakarta
- Regency: West Jakarta
- Subdistrict: Taman Sari
- Postal code: 11180

Mangga Besar is an administrative village of Taman Sari, West Jakarta, Indonesia.This village is adjacent to Pinangsia Road (Glodok) in the north, Ciliwung River to the west, Tangki to the east and Mangga Besar Road in the south. The neighborhood is a popular nightlife destination in Jakarta.

== History ==
Historically, the area is one of the first 'lokalisasi' area of the Batavian era. In the past, the Batavian community knew PSK as 'cabo', which was adapted from 'caibo' - a mandarin term for ladies of the night. Visitors were VOC officials and Chinese traders. Husada Hospital was established in 1924 making it one of the longest-serving hospitals in Jakarta.

== Demographics ==
Historically, the population of this neighborhood was predominantly ethnic Chinese Indonesian like the adjacent Chinatown of Glodok, but the Chinese Indonesian population has been shrinking. There are at least 3 Chinese temples within the neighborhood. Vihara Avalokitesvara temple, one of the Chinese temples, was built in 1936 and has altars of Buddha and Guan Yin (Goddess of Mercy).

Today, Mangga Besar is increasingly becoming known as Jakarta’s "Little Italy". A growing number of Italians are moving into Mangga Besar, and they are establishing businesses such as restaurants, grocery stores, bakeries, and pizzerias.

== Culinary, club, cafe and karaoke ==
Mangga Besar is an area of Jakarta with a lot of nightlife. It also has many restaurants. Many cuisines are available there.

Numerous bars, nightclubs, karaoke bars, cafés, and massage parlors are located in the area. Lokasari Plaza is a shopping mall which also houses hotels, nightclubs, bar, karaoke and massage parlor.

== Transportation ==
The area is served by TransJakarta corridor 1, Blok M-Kota route. Mangga Besar railway station of Jakarta metro rail is located in the neighborhood.

== See also ==
- Glodok
