= Motomachi, Kobe =

District of Kobe, Japan

Motomachi
- Machi
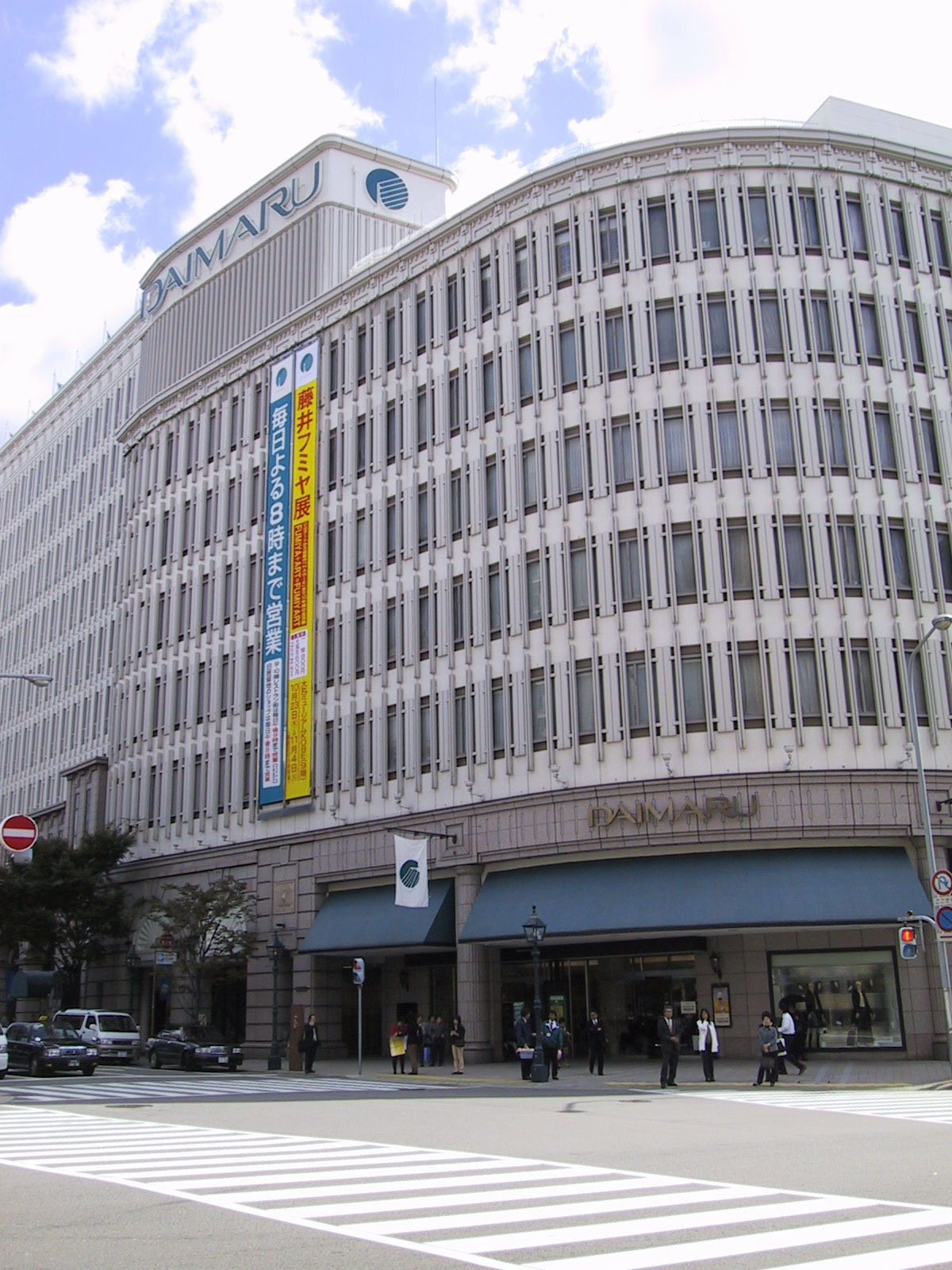
- Daimaru Department Store, Kobe

- Location within Kobe Location within Hyōgo Prefecture Location within Japan
- Coordinates: 34°41′16″N 135°11′05″E
- Country: Japan
- Prefecture: Hyōgo
- City: Kobe
- Ward: Chūō

Motomachi (Japanese: 元町) is a district of Chūō Ward in Kobe, Japan. It is located between Mount Rokkō and the port of Kobe.

It is located adjacent to Nankinmachi (南京町: Kobe Chinatown) and Kyū-kyoryūchi (旧居留地: a foreign settlement in the 19th century: there are several buildings from that time, now used as restaurants or coffee shops.). Daimaru department store and several boutiques (BVLGARI, Giorgio Armani, Dunhill, etc.) are in Motomachi, as well as a mile-long covered shopping street.

There were many trading companies in Motomachi in the 19th century.

It is also well known in Japan for its cosmopolitan atmosphere, and foreign influence, similar to the Motomachi area in Yokohama, Ginza in Tokyo and Shinsaibashi in Osaka.

== Transportation ==
Motomachi Station serves the JR Kobe Line, the Hanshin Main Line and the Kobe Rapid Transit Railway Tōzai Line.

In 2001, a 400m east-west Sannomiya Chuo-dori underground passage connecting Sannomiya and Motomachi was opened. It was decided to nickname it "Sampo Chika" by public offering in 2021.
