= Nagasaki Shinchi Chinatown =

Ethnic enclave in Nagasaki, Japan

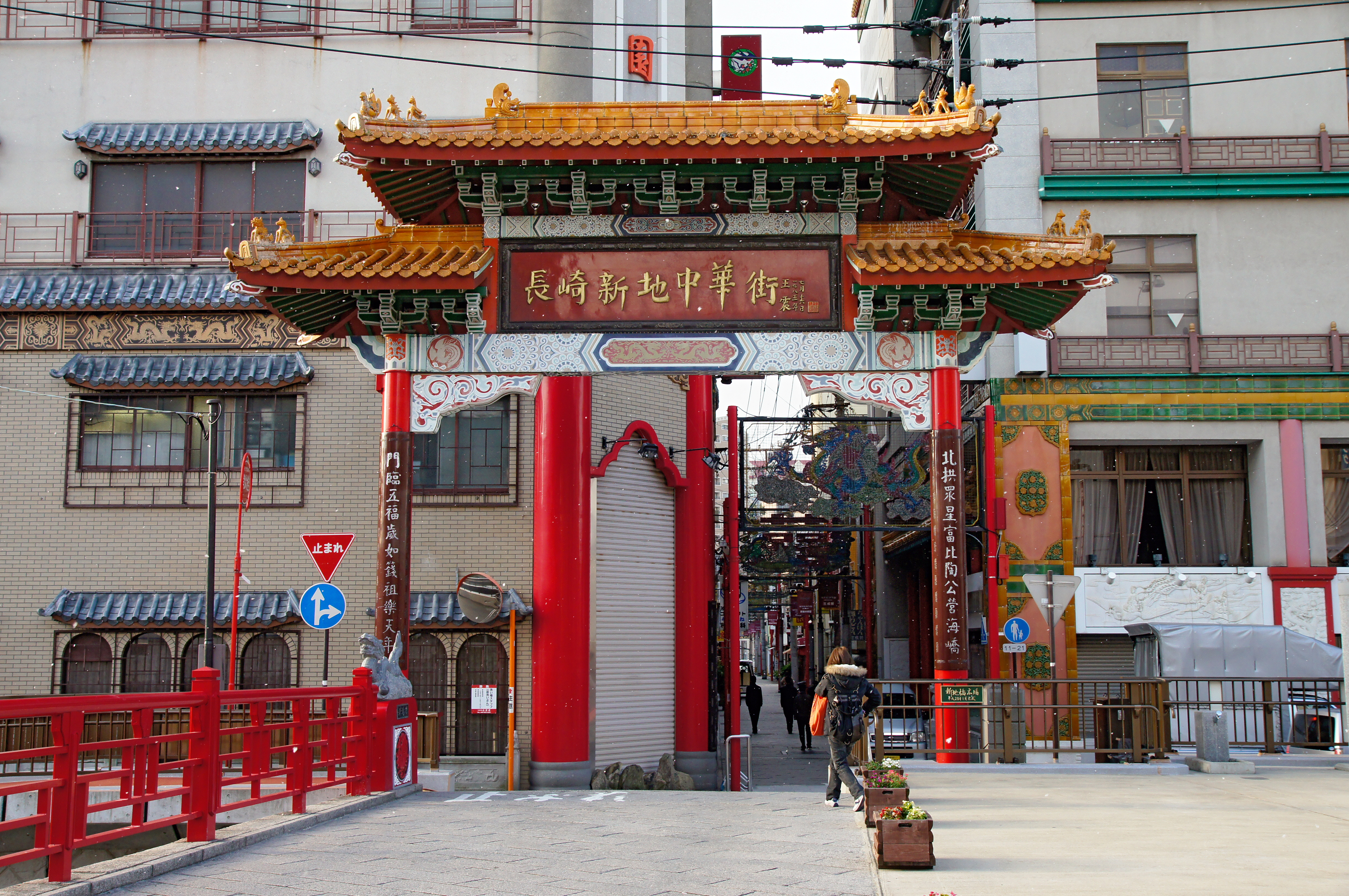
- Entrance of Shinchi Chinatown
- Interactive map of Nagasaki Shinchi Chinatown
- Coordinates: 32°44′31″N 129°52′33″E
- Country: Japan
- Region: Kyushu
- Prefecture: Nagasaki Prefecture

Chinese name
- Traditional Chinese: 長崎新地中華街
- Simplified Chinese: 长崎新地中华街
- Hakka: Congˇ gia xinˊ ti zungˊ faˇ gieˊ
Transcriptions
Standard Mandarin
- Hanyu Pinyin: Chángqí Xīndì Zhōnghuájiē
- Wade–Giles: Chang^{2}chi'i^{2} Hsin^{1}ti^{4} Chung^{1}hua^{2}chieh^{1}
- IPA: [ʈʂʰǎŋtɕʰǐ ɕíntî ʈʂʊ́ŋxwǎtɕjé]
Hakka
- Romanization: Congˇ gia xinˊ ti zungˊ faˇ gieˊ
Yue: Cantonese
- Yale Romanization: Cheung4kei1 San1dei6 Jung1wa4gaai1

Japanese name
- Kanji: 長崎新地中華街
- Hiragana: ながさきしんちちゅうかがい
Transcriptions
- Revised Hepburn: Nagasaki Shinchi Chūkagai

A short walk in Nagasaki Shinchi Chinatown, 2022

Nagasaki Shinchi Chinatown (Japanese: ながさき しんち ちゅうかがい, 長崎新地中華街, Simplified Chinese: 长崎新地中华街) is an area located in Nagasaki, Nagasaki, Japan. Today, this area is a shopping strip covering many blocks.

Most of the Chinese members of Nagasaki Chinatown are of Fuzhounese descent. Nagasaki and Fuzhou established ties as sister cities in 1980 to recognize the historical connections between the two cities and Fuzhounese immigrant community.

== History ==
This area was originally the location of the warehouses of Chinese merchants, who traded goods to Japan from the 15th to 19th centuries. They lived in the 'Chinese residence' (Tojin yashiki) a little to the south-east (today's Kannaimachi 館内町).

The Chinese traders came to Nagasaki because it was the only open port in Japan during the Tokugawa period. The Tokugawa government allowed only Nagasaki to stay open to Chinese and Dutch traders, closing off the rest of Japan to prevent European political influence and the spread of Christianity.

Strict rules were placed on these Chinese traders, forcing them to stay within the precincts of the Tojin yashiki at night. Anyone found outside the area during prohibited times was arrested by the local guard.

== See also ==
- Chinatowns in Asia
  - Yokohama Chinatown
  - Nankin-machi (“Nanjing Town” in Kobe)
- Chinese in Japan
- Koreatown in Japan
