= Taman Sari, Jakarta =

District in West Jakarta, Indonesia

Coordinates: 6.1485°S 106.8208°E

Taman Sari District
- (Indonesia) District of West Jakarta
- Kecamatan Taman Sari

Native transcription(s)
  - Javanese: ꦠꦩꦤ꧀ꦱꦫꦶ
  - Sundanese: ᮒᮙᮔ᮪ᮞᮛᮤ
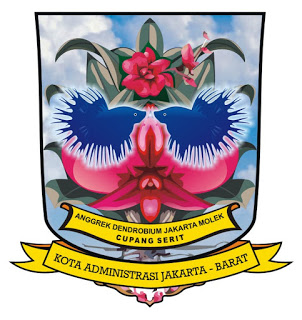
- Flag Emblem

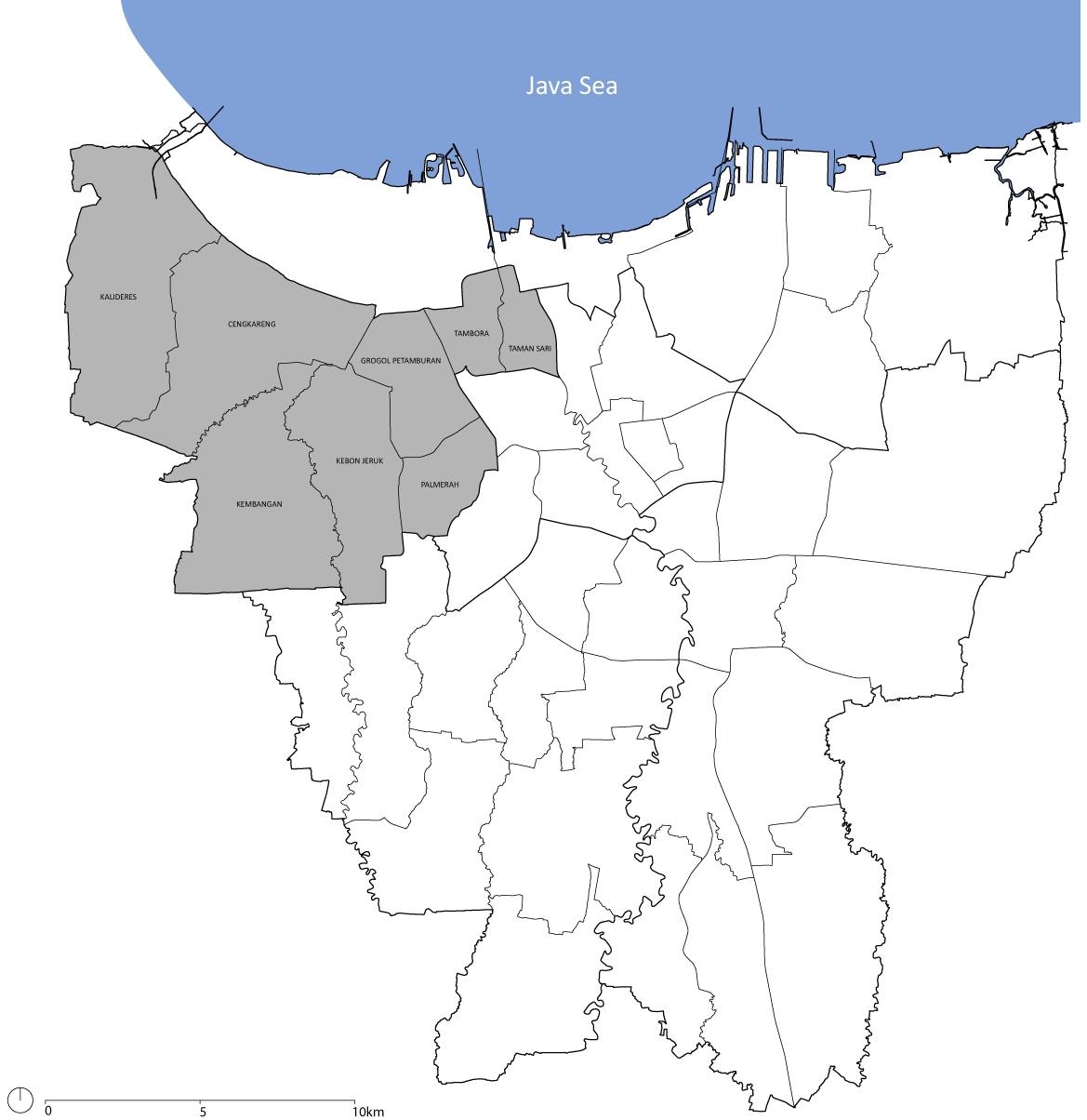
- Location of Taman Sari District in West Jakarta
- Interactive map of Taman Sari District
- Location of Taman Sari District in Jakarta
- Country: Indonesia
- Province: Jakarta
- Seat: Jakarta

Government
  - Head of District officer: -

Area
  - Total: 7.73 km^{2} (2.98 sq mi)
- Time zone: UTC+7 (IST)
  - Summer (DST): UTC+7 (Western Indonesia Time)
- Postcode: 110xxx
- Vehicle registration plates: B

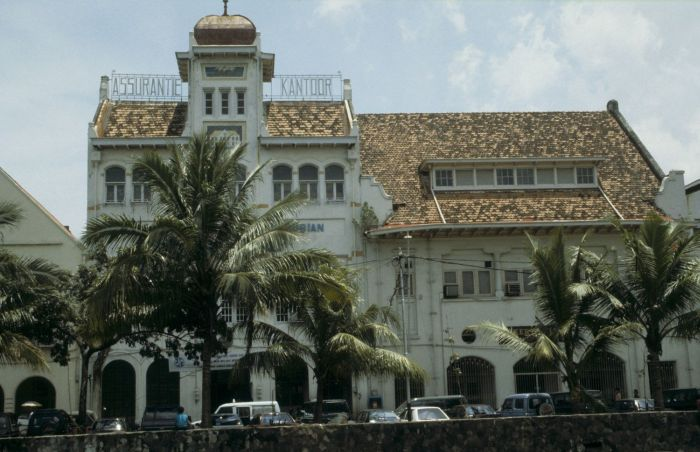
Colonial building on the east side of Kali Besar Canal.

The district. Click for broader map and to enable varied magnification.

Taman Sari is a district (kecamatan) of West Jakarta Administrative City, Indonesia. It is the smallest district of West Jakarta (4.37 km^{2}). It is bounded by Central Jakarta to the south and to the east, and by Pademangan in North Jakarta to the north.

Taman Sari District contains the southeastern area of Jakarta Old Town, the area on the east side of Kali Besar Canal. The Old Town formed Batavia (the old name for Jakarta) during the 17th century. This historic area is in the Pinangsia Administrative Village, the northern part of the district.

== Taman Sari administrative village ==
The district is in recent decades defined and drawn as west of Mangga Besar railway station. It was substantively developed in 1913 by the Municipality of Batavia as one of the first attempt to systematically meet the demand for housing for the increasing local native population of Jakarta. The original core area of Taman Sari was near where Prinsenlaan (Jalan Mangga Besar) and Drossaersweg (Jalan Taman Sari Raya) meet. The layout of the project was rectangular and divided into four blocks: one parallel to Jalan Mangga Besar, the other three parallel to Jalan Taman Sari Raya, the closest block along the latter undeveloped and intended for recreational use. Various housing types were allocated to the project: The northern part consisted of greatest variety of houses, from detached housing, to house with adjunct shop (a warung); the southern part has a slightly narrower and shallower plot with smaller house types. The larger northern area had an en suite bathroom and toilet for each property, while the southern area had communal sanitary facilities.

Despite its central location, the project proved to be a failure. Most natives did not want to settle given the Western-style house layout. In 1918, five years after it was implemented, the city council decided to demolish the project. The project became a learning process for kampong-improvement projects in the Indies that the then-citizens would, broadly, not ascribe to a Dutch model.

== Kelurahan (administrative villages) ==
The district of Taman Sari is divided into eight kelurahan or administrative villages:

- Pinangsia - area code 11110
- Glodok - area code 11120. The area is Jakarta's oldest and largest China town.
- Keagungan - area code 11130
- Krukut - area code 11140
- Taman Sari - area code 11150
- Maphar - area code 11160
- Tangki - area code 11170
- Mangga Besar - area code 11180

== List of important places ==
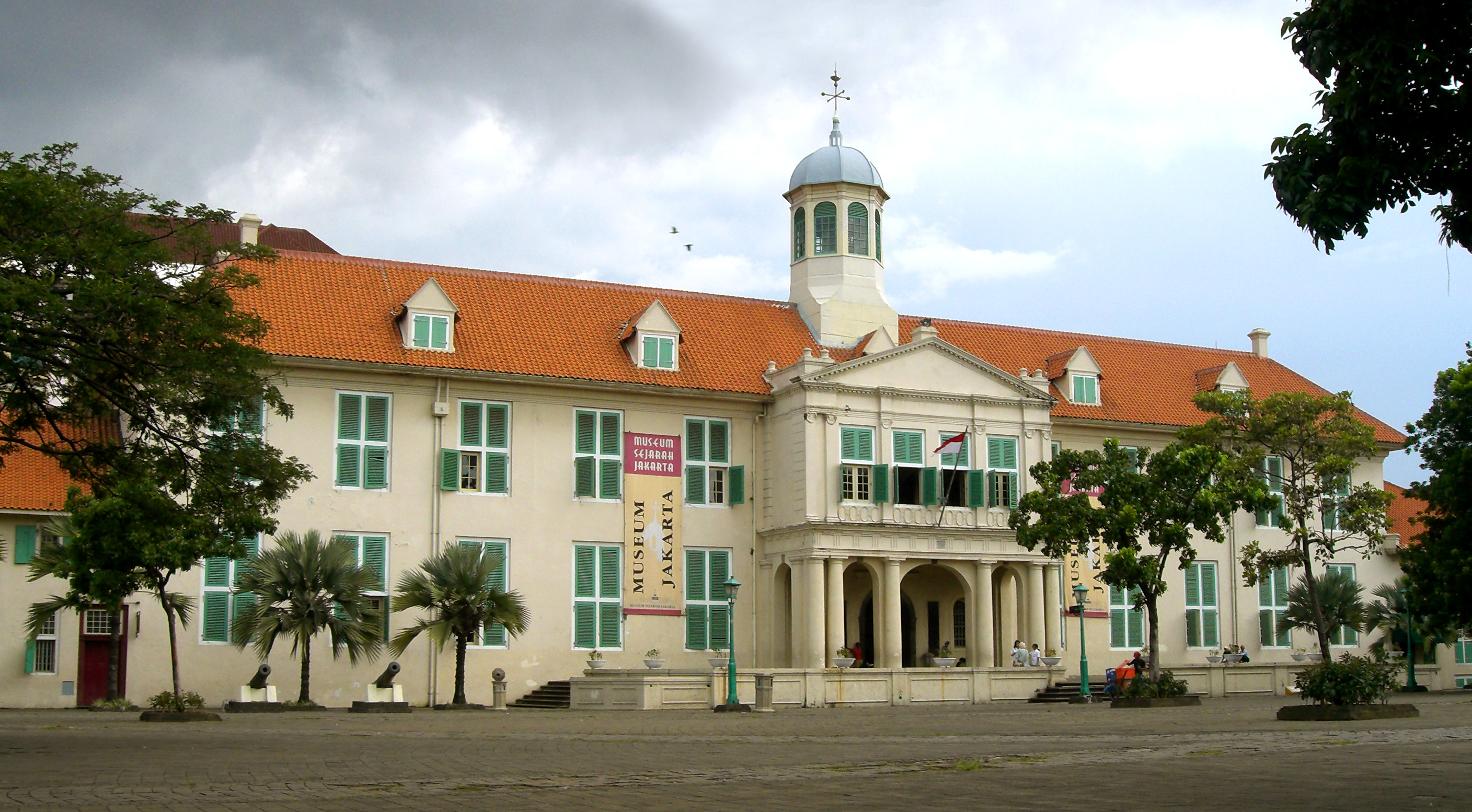
Fatahillah Museum, the former city hall of Batavia, in Jakarta Old Town.

- Bank Indonesia Museum
- Bank Mandiri Museum
- Café Batavia
- Ceramic Museum
- Fatahillah Museum
- Jakarta Kota railway station
- National Archive Building
- Sion Church
- Wayang Museum
- Jakarta's Chinatown

== See also ==
- Glodok
- Mangga Besar
