= Yokohama Chinatown =

Neighborhood in Yokohama, Japan

Coordinates: 35°26′34″N 139°38′45″E

Chinese name
- Traditional Chinese: 橫濱中華街
- Simplified Chinese: 横滨中华街
Transcriptions
Standard Mandarin
- Hanyu Pinyin: Hèngbīn Zhōnghuájiē
- Bopomofo: ㄏㄥˋ ㄅㄧㄣ ㄓㄨㄥ ㄏㄨㄚˊ ㄐㄧㄝ
- Wade–Giles: Heng^{4}-pin^{1} chung^{1}-hua^{2}-chieh^{1}
- IPA: [xə̂ŋ.pín ʈʂʊŋ.xwǎ.tɕjé]
Hakka
- Romanization: Vang binˊ zungˊ faˇ gieˊ
Yue: Cantonese
- Yale Romanization: Wàahng bān Jūng wàh gāai
- Jyutping: Waang4 ban1 zung1 waa4 gaai1
- IPA: [waŋ˩ pɐn˥ tsʊŋ˥ wa˩ kaj˥]

Japanese name
- Kanji: 横浜中華街
- Hiragana: よこはまちゅうかがい
Transcriptions
- Revised Hepburn: Yokohama chūkagai
- Kunrei-shiki: Yokohama tyûkagai

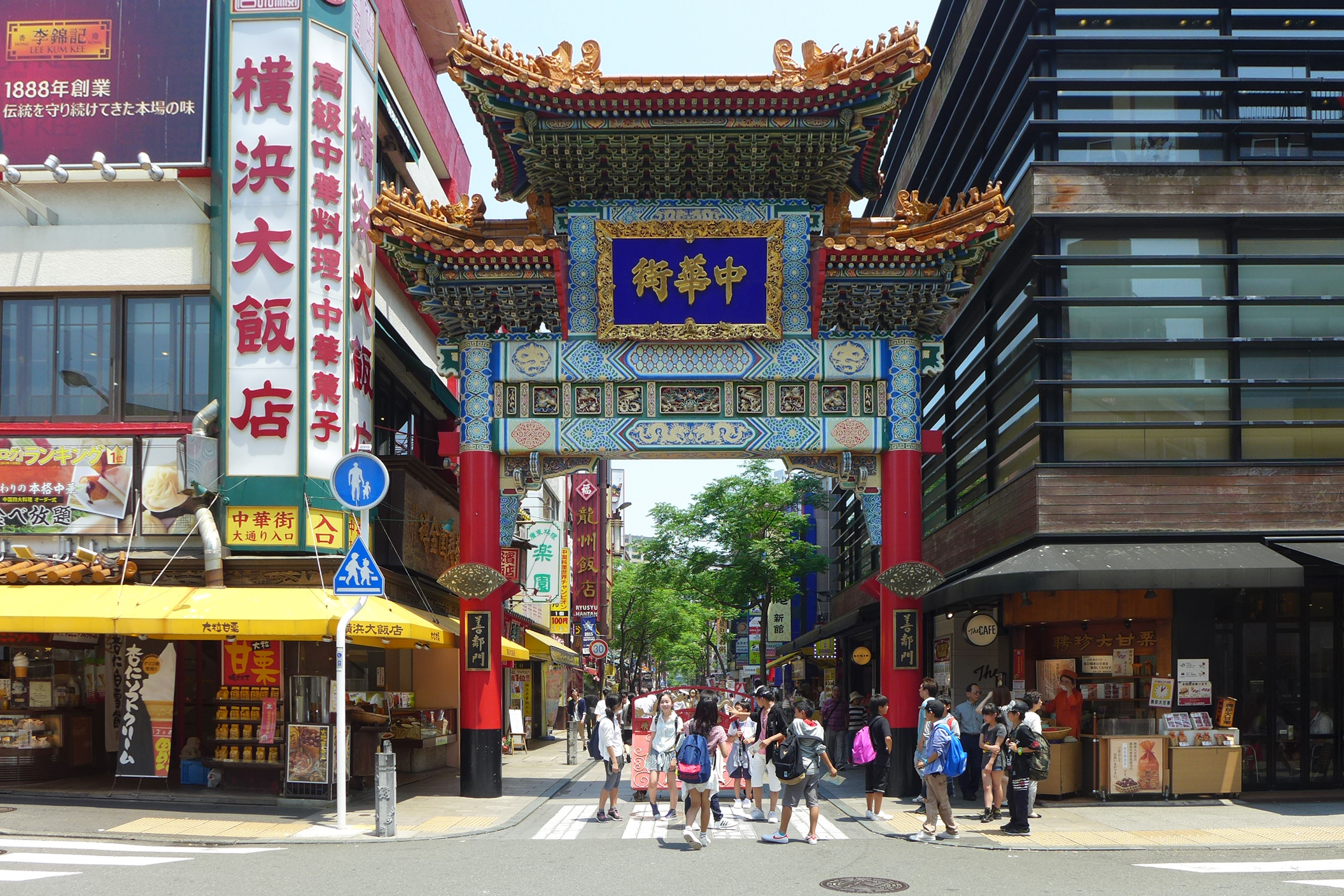
Zenrinmon Gate (善隣門), one of Yokohama Chinatown's Paifang

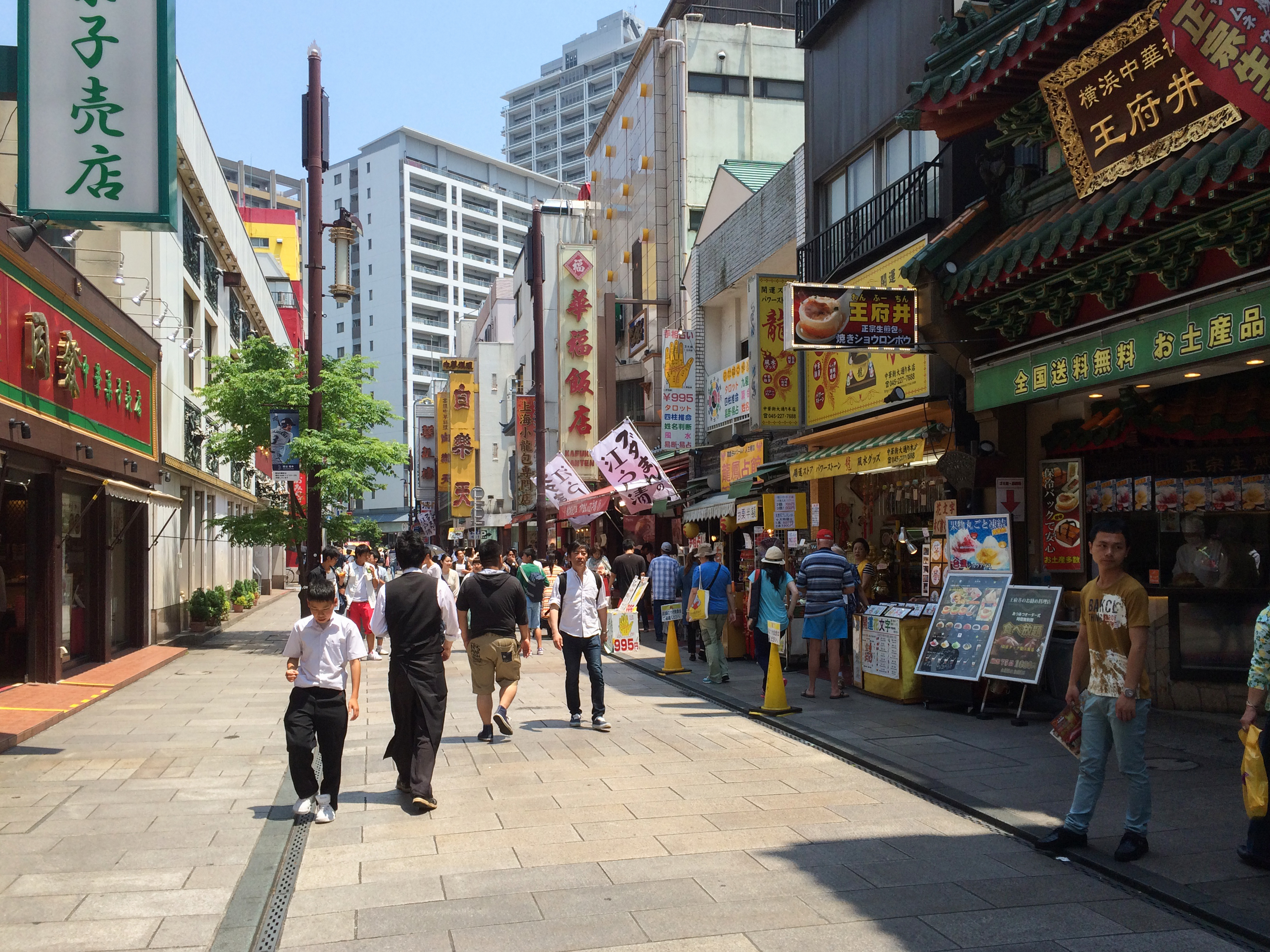
Walking area

Various views of Yokohama Chinatown, 2022

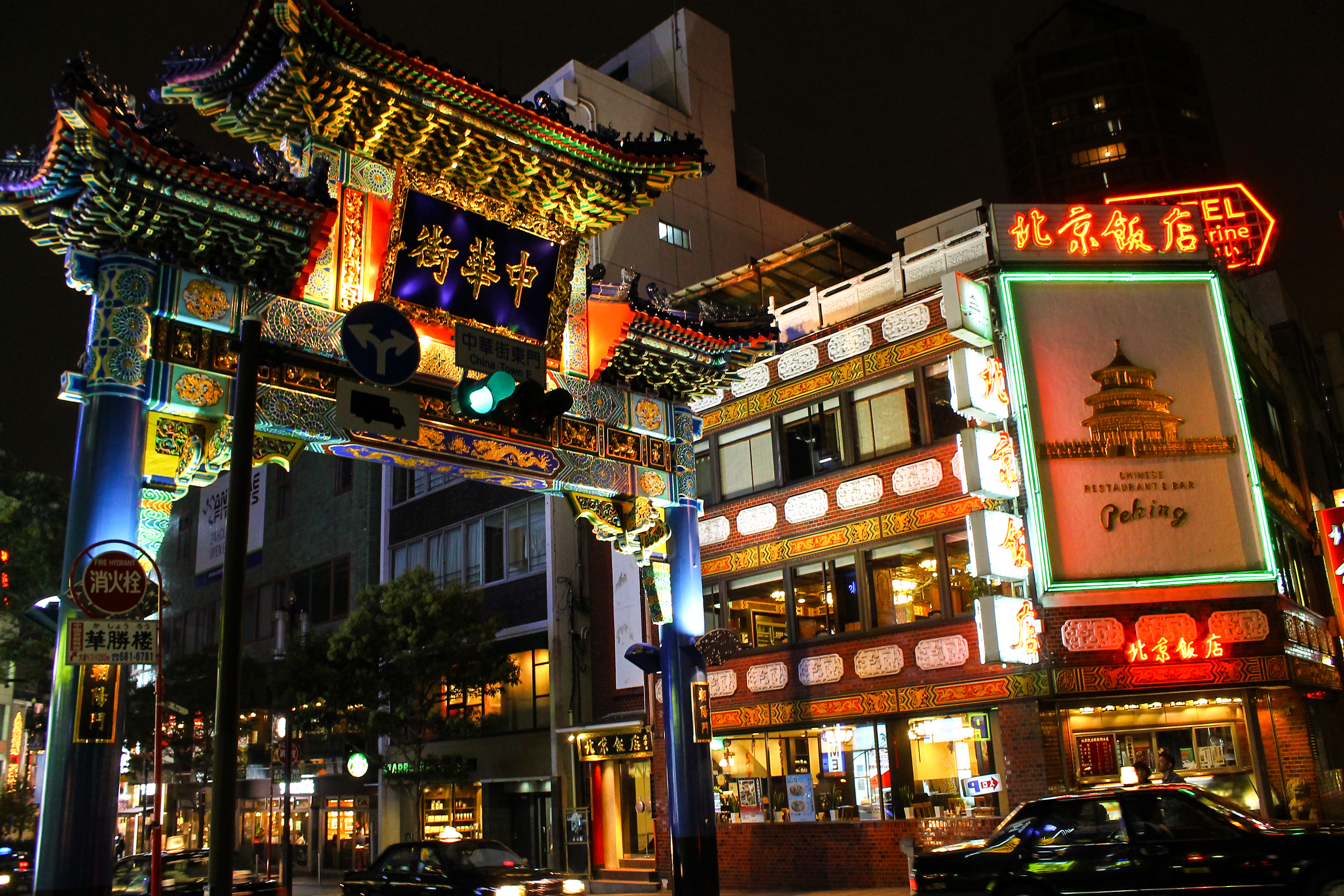
Chōyōmon Gate (朝陽門) At Night

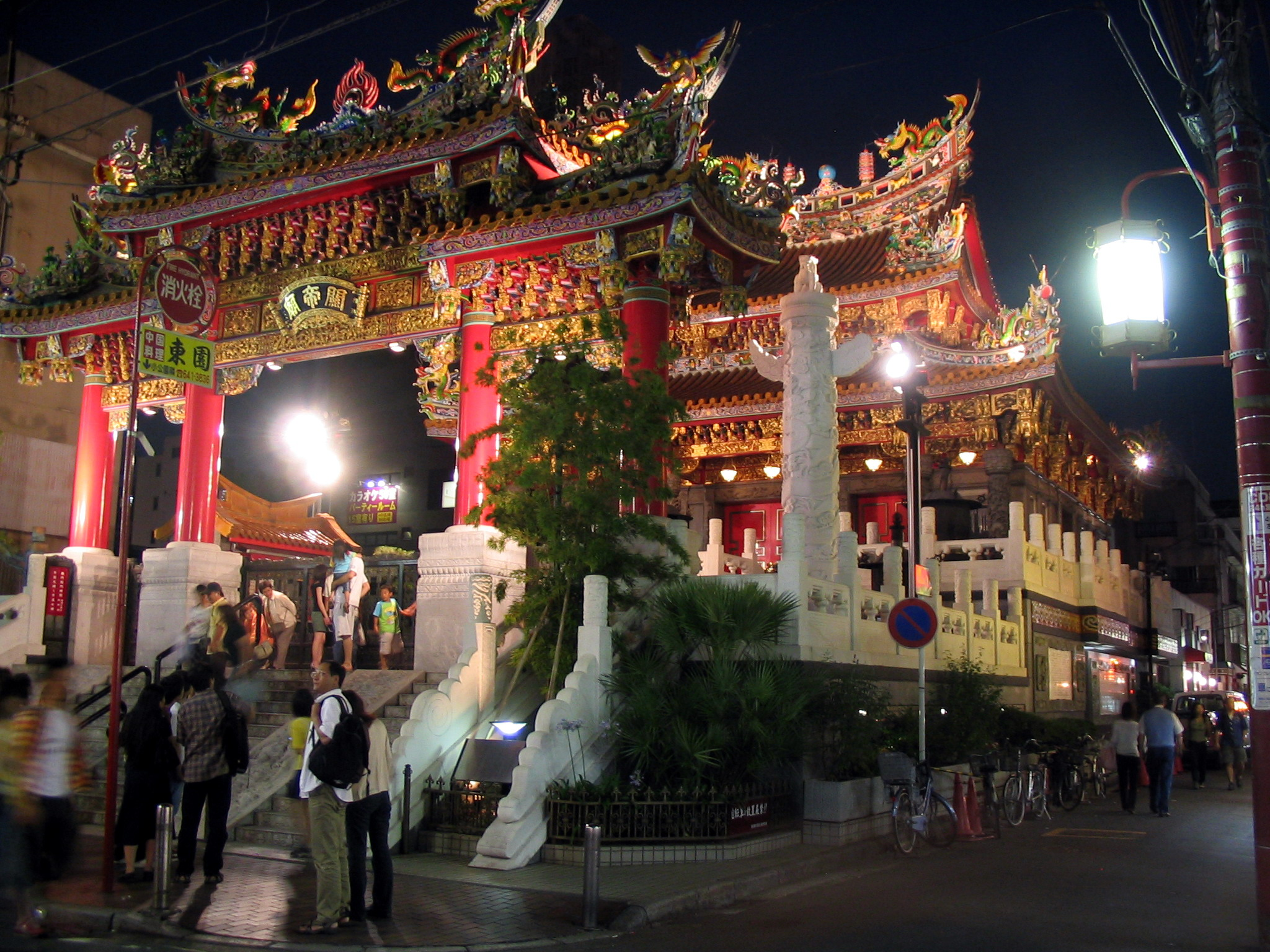
Kwan Tai Temple in Yokohama Chinatown

Map

Yokohama Chinatown (横浜中華街, Yokohama chūkagai; Chinese: 橫濱中華街) is located in Yokohama, Japan, which is located just south of Tokyo. It was established in the late 19th century, and has a population of about 3,000 to 4,000.

Yokohama Chinatown is the largest Chinatown in Japan, larger than both Kobe Chinatown and Nagasaki Chinatown. There are roughly 250 Chinese-owned or themed shops and restaurants scattered throughout the district, with the highest concentration centered on a 300 m^{2} (3,200 sq ft) area.

== History ==
In 1859, when the sea port opened in Yokohama, many Chinese immigrants arrived in Japan and formed settlements. In its early days, American and British trading companies, many of which had already engaged in trade with China, expanded their operations into Yokohama, with accompanying Chinese agents. These agents were entrusted to negotiate with Japanese merchants in the buying of raw silk and tea, which, at the time, was a major product imported from Japan. Later, ferry services from Yokohama to Shanghai and Hong Kong were started. Many Chinese traders came to Japan and built a Chinese school, Chinese community center, and various other facilities in what represented the beginning of Chinatown. However, government regulations at the time meant that immigrants were not permitted to live outside of the designated foreign settlement area. In 1899, new laws gave Chinese increased freedom of movement while reinforcing strict rules on the types of work Chinese people were allowed to perform.

Much of the Chinatown’s early growth is attributed to the increased trade between China and Japan, following the Sino-Japanese Trade Treaty in 1871. This led to Chinese immigrants taking on a variety of professions converging into one geographical location.

In 1923, the Kanto Area was devastated by the Great Kantō earthquake. Around 100,000 people were killed and approximately 1.9 million people became homeless. Chinatown also suffered and many immigrants chose to return to China instead of rebuilding their lives in Yokohama. Overall, the total death toll among the Chinese population in Yokohama Chinatown was as many as 1,541, approximately one third of the total 4,705 prior to the event. After the earthquake, there had been a major shake-up in the social structure within Yokohama Chinatown, sowing the seeds for Chinese gourmet business to grow within the overseas Chinese community. Four years after the earthquake, around half of the Chinese population within this area were barbers, tailors or chefs.

In 1937, full-scale war between China and Japan erupted, effectively stopping further growth of Chinatown. After the war ended, Chinatown once again began to grow. In 1955, a large goodwill gate was built. That is when the Chinatown was officially recognized and called Yokohama Chukagai (Yokohama Chinatown).

In 1972, Japan established diplomatic relations with the People's Republic of China, and severed relations with the Republic of China on Taiwan. Interest among Japanese people grew and led to an explosion in the number of visitors to Chinatown. It soon became a major sightseeing spot in Yokohama.

On February 1, 2004, the Minatomirai Line railway was opened, along with the Motomachi-Chūkagai Station, which serves Chinatown directly.

2006 saw the establishment of the Mazu Miao temple to mark the 150th anniversary of Yokohama Chinatown, and has become a significant part of the area's modern landscape.

== Transportation ==
Chinatown can be reached by train, bus, seabus and car.

=== Train ===
- Minatomirai Line, Motomachi-Chūkagai Station (35 min from Shibuya Station in Tokyo)
- Negishi Line, Ishikawachō Station (35 min from Shinagawa Station in Tokyo)

=== Bus ===
There are 6 bus routes from Yokohama Station East bus depot and from Sakuragichō Bus Depot, 16 bus routes that go to Yokohama Chinatown.

=== Seabus ===
- Seabus (Ferry)

=== Highway ===
- Shuto Expressway K1 Yokohane Route, Yokohama Kōen (Yokohama Park) Exit
- Shuto Expressway K3 Kariba Route. (At Tomei Expressway Intersection, go Hodogaya Bypass then exit at Shin Yamashita.)
- Shuto Expressway Wangan Line (Via Tokyo Bay Aqua Line Tunnel, Exit at Shin Yamashita.)
- Tomei Expressway (Via Hodogaya Bypass)

== See also ==
- Yokohama Ma Zu Miao
- Yokohama Overseas Chinese School
- Yokohama Yamate Chinese School
- Chinatown
- Chinatowns in Asia
  - Nankin-machi ("Nanjing Town" in Kobe)
  - Nagasaki Shinchi Chinatown
- Chinese in Japan
- China
- Koreatowns in Japan
- Chinatowns in the United States
- Incheon Chinatown
