= Nankin-machi =

Chinatown of Kobe, Japan

Nankin-machi 南京町 (Japanese)
- Neighborhood
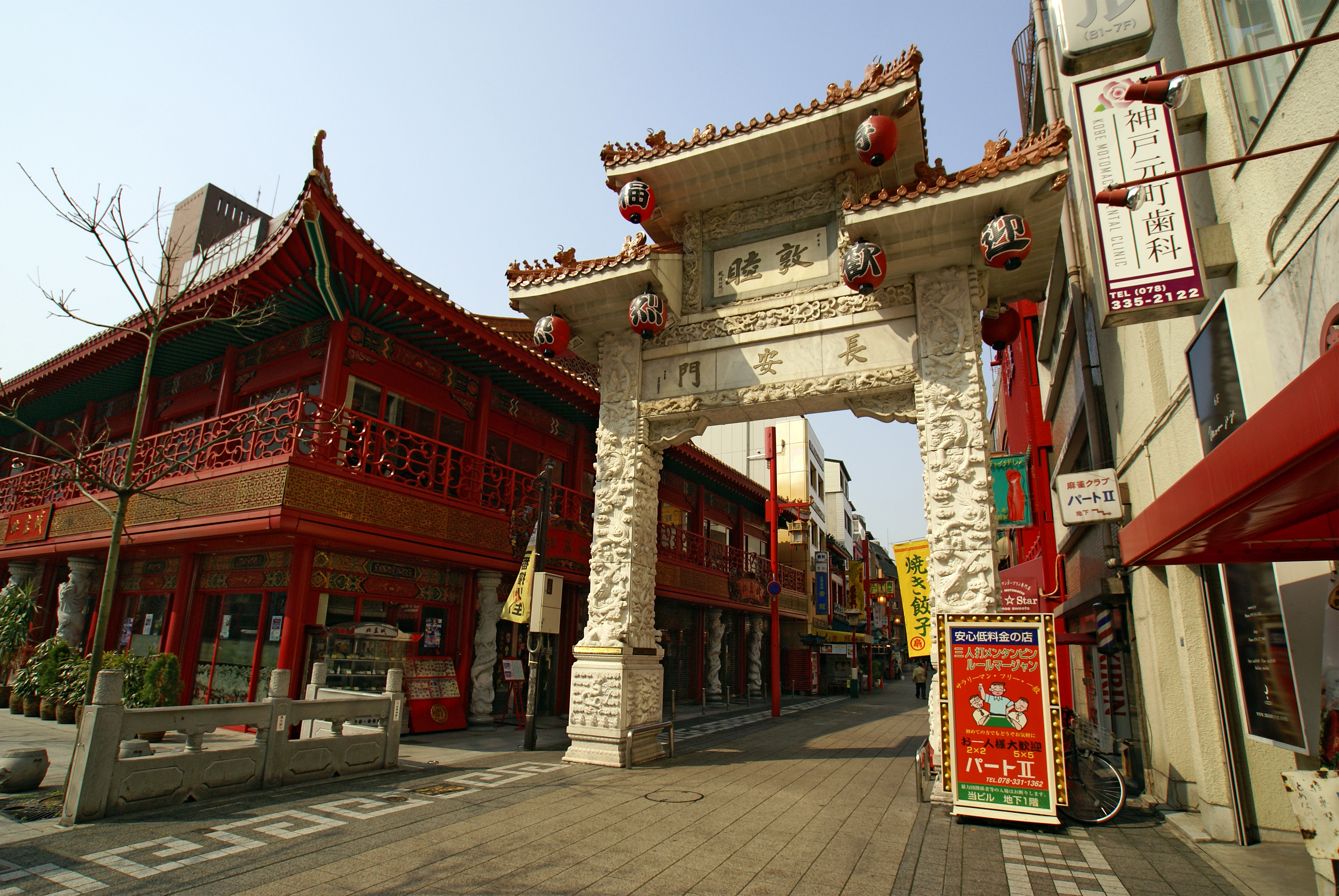
- Interactive map of Nankin-machi
- Coordinates: 34°41′17″N 135°11′17″E
- Country: Japan
- Region: Kansai
- Prefecture: Hyōgo Prefecture
- City: Kobe

Chinese name
- Simplified Chinese: 南京町
- Literal meaning: Nanjing town
Transcriptions
Standard Mandarin
- Hanyu Pinyin: Nánjīng Dīng
- Wade–Giles: Nan^{2}ching^{1}ting^{1}
- IPA: [nǎntɕíŋ tíŋ]
Yue: Cantonese
- Yale Romanization: Naam4 ging1 ting2

Japanese name
- Kanji: 南京町
- Hiragana: なんきんまち
Transcriptions
- Traditional Hepburn: Nankinmachi

Nankin-machi (南京町; lit. 'Nanjing town') is a neighborhood in Kobe, Japan located south of Motomachi station adjacent to the Daimaru Department Store and is a major tourist attraction. Considered as Kobe's Chinatown, the area has over a hundred Chinese restaurants, shops, and a Chinese temple dedicated to Lord Guan (関帝廟, Kanteibyō).

== History ==
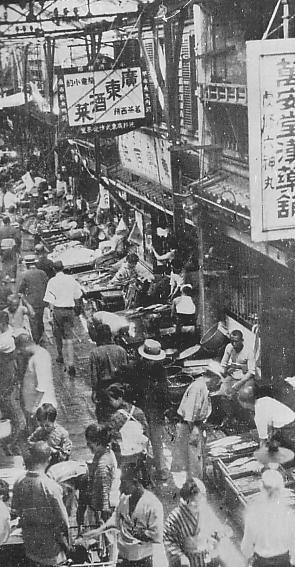
Nankin-machi in the 1930s

Nankin-machi originated in 1868, when Kobe's port was opened to foreigners including Chinese immigrants from Guangdong and Fujian. The newcomers settled in the western end of Kobe's foreign district, which soon became the focal point for subsequent Chinese migrants. During that time, many Chinese people from the city of Nanjing also immigrated to the city of Kobe, hence the name of the neighborhood "Nankinmachi" (Nanjing Town). By the early 1920s, Nankinmachi was a vibrant area bustling with businesses, restaurants, and homes. That all changed, however, during World War II, when it was destroyed during the allied bombings of Kobe, Nankinmachi was re-built after the war by the remaining Chinese community that stayed behind in post-war Japan. In 1995, it was severely damaged during the Great Hanshin earthquake. It was quickly rebuilt, and once again thrives as a center of Chinese culture and activity throughout the Kansai region. There are currently 10,000 people residing in Nankin-machi.

== Characteristics ==
Nankinmachi is considered a tourist attraction for the important role it plays in Kobe's cultural landscape was demonstrated in 1985 by the erection of an archway, Chang'an Gate (長安門). Subsequent projects include the addition of a pair of lions, granite floors, and other initiatives. Three archways demarcate Nankinmachi proper: Chang'an Gate in the east, Xi'an Gate (西安門) to the west, and Nanlou Gate (南樓門) from the south. There is no archway at the northern entrance, which is guarded by a pair of lions. A pavilion with stone carvings of the 12 Chinese zodiac signs marks the intersecting point of the north–south/east–west axis of Nankinmachi. This is a popular resting place for visitors, as well as a favorite spot for taking photographs.

== Culture ==
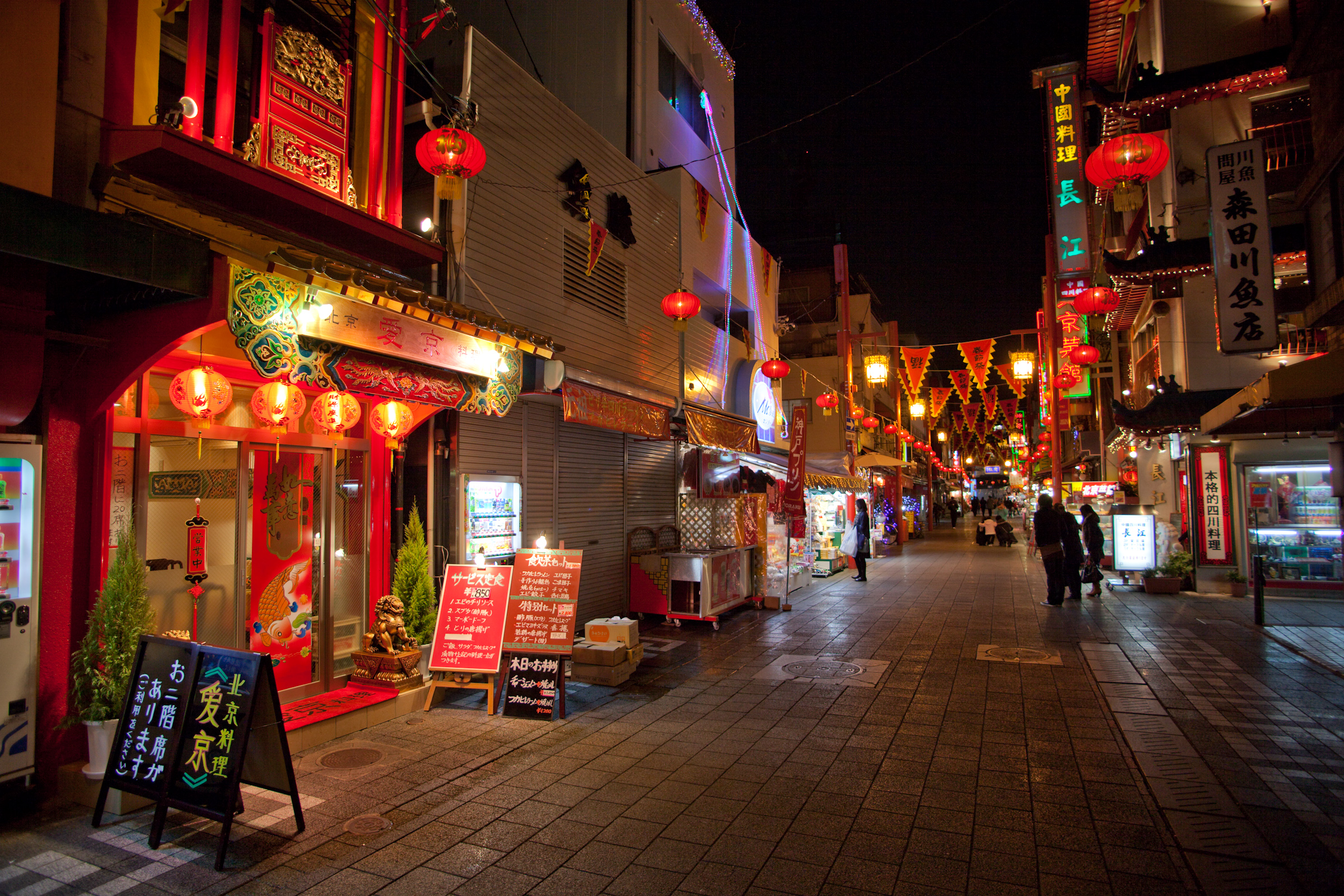
Kobe Chinatown in the evening.

Many establishments such as mahjong clubs and souvenir shops abound throughout Nankinmachi, but none are as prevalent as food businesses. Along the streets of Nankinmachi are restaurants and stalls that serve both Chinese Japanese food, Western steak houses as well.

Most shops show off their cuisine on display stands for potential customers. Some examples include dim sum, dumplings, buns, and Chinese pastries. During the Lunar New Year and the Mid Autumn season, two major festivals celebrated by Chinese people worldwide, New Year's delicacies and Moon Cakes appear.

== Transport ==
Motomachi train station is 3 min from Sannomiya Station, 25 min from Osaka Station on the JR Kobe Line, and 30 min from Umeda Station on the Hanshin Main Line.

On the Hanshin Expressway: 3 Kobe Route, Kyobashi Exit and on the 5 Wangan Route, Rokko Island Exit

== See also ==
- Chinatowns in Asia
  - Yokohama Chinatown
  - Nagasaki Shinchi Chinatown
- Chinese in Japan
- Kobe Chinese School
- China
- Motomachi, Kobe
