= Warorot Market =

Market in Chiang Mai City, Thailand

Coordinates: 18°47′24.7986″N 99°0′2.3652″E

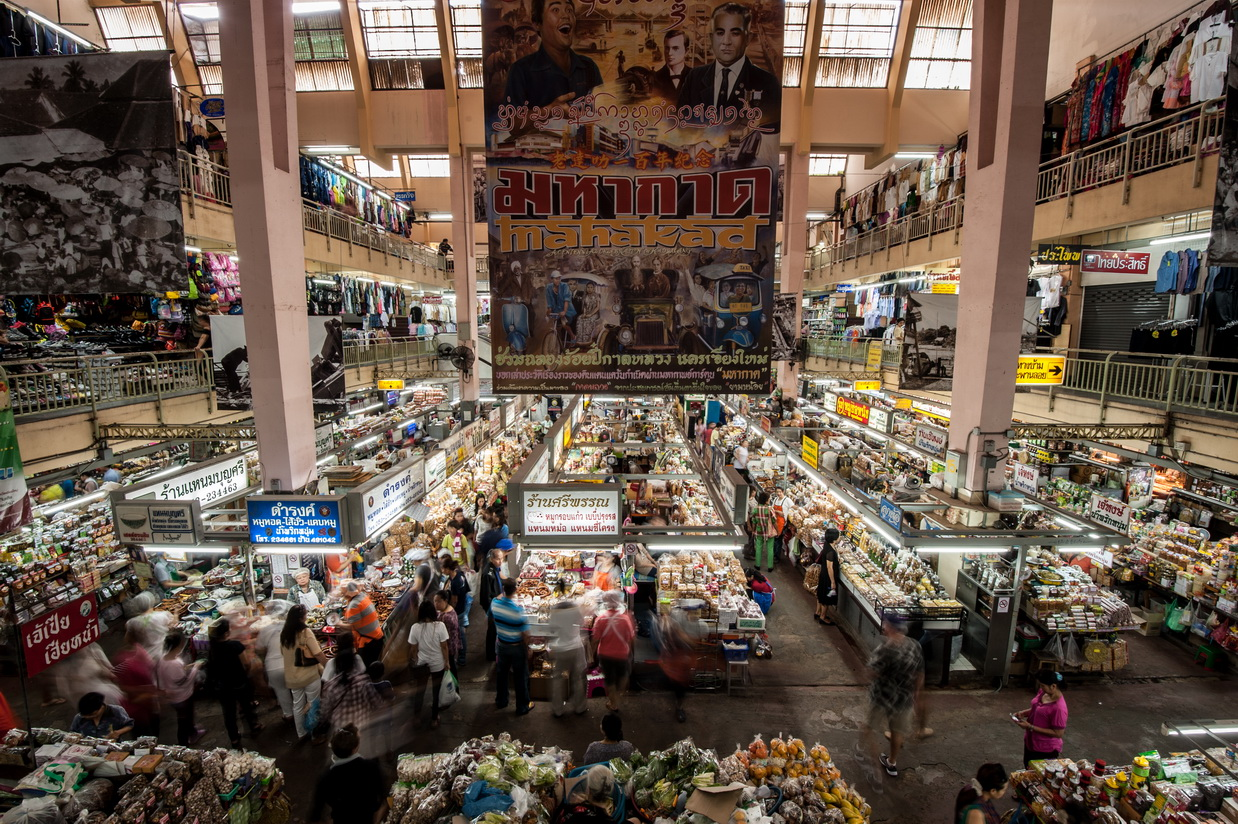
Atmosphere of Warorot Market in 2013

Warorot Market (Thai: ตลาดวโรรส; or spelled Waroros), locally known as Kad Luang (กาดหลวง; lit: "Big Market") is a market and one of tourist attractions in Chiang Mai Province, regarded as the largest and most well-known market in the north region of Thailand. Located at Wichayanon Road, Tambon Chang Moi, Chiang Mai City and close to Chang Khlan Road.

Originally, the location of the market used to be the place for the funeral ceremony of the ruler of Chiang Mai called "Khuang Main" (ข่วงเมรุ), later, Princess Dara Rasmi improved it to be a market in 1910. It was named in honour of Prince Intavaroros Suriyavongse the 8th ruler of Chiang Mai.

At present, this market is well known in the source of selling local products, especially northern food, which is rare in other regions such as Sai ua (northern Thai sausage), Moo yo (traditional Vietnamese pork sausage), Nam phrik num (northern Thai green pepper chili paste) including dry food such as dried fruits etc. Apart from local food, there are also clothes, ceramic, cloth, embroidery appliances, flowers and many others.

Besides, one part of the alley market is called "Trok Lao Zhou" (ตรอกเล่าโจ๊ว) is a source of both Chinese and Hmong. Hmong will bring local products and handicrafts for sale daily from 7.00 am to 5.00 pm. It has been named as "Chinatown of Chiang Mai".
