= Chak Ngaeo =

Coordinates: 12°49′51.93″N 100°58′31.95″E

Chak Ngaeo or Ban Chak Ngaeo (or spelled: Chakngeaw; Thai: ชากแง้ว, บ้านชากแง้ว; lit: Chak Ngaeo Village; Chinese: 茶格; pinyin: Chá gé) is a community and village located in Tambon Huai Yai, Bang Lamung District, Chonburi Province, eastern Thailand. It is a community of Thai Chinese who still maintain the traditional lifestyle similar to Talad Noi in Bangkok. Even though it is located less than 10 kilometers (6.21 mi) from Pattaya, where Pattaya is a world-class tourist destination filled with pubs, bars or liquor stores includes agogo bars and many Western tourists. It has been dubbed "Chinatown of the East".

== History ==
Chak Ngaeo has a long history of not less than 200 years. The geography of the community consists of plains surrounded by hills or rolling plains, swamps, canals, and the distance from the seashore is only 8–9 km (4.9–5.5 mi) away, so there are abundant soil, water and forest resources. Thailand's famous poet Sunthorn Phu (สุนทรภู่) wrote about Chak Ngaeo in his "Journey to Muang Klaeng" (นิราศเมืองแกลง) in the year of 1807 (the end of the reign of King Rama I in the early Rattanakosin) during a visit to his father in Muang Klaeng (now Amphoe Klaeng), Rayong province. When he arrived here in the nightfall and have called "Nong Cha Ngaeo" (หนองชะแง้ว; Cha Ngaeo Marsh).

According to the above literature, it can be assumed that "Chak Ngaeo" originated "Cha Ngae" (ชะแง้) which means raising head to look, you must raise your head while looking because the community was located on low plains surrounded by hills. Another assumption is "Chak" means flood plains or scrub forests, maybe forests which re-grow after being cut, "Ngaeo" comes from "Ngew" (งิ้ว; cotton trees) because cotton trees can be widely seen in this area.

In the before 1960s, not long ago. Chinese immigrants (mostly Teochew) who came to live in Thailand. They have settled here and have grown cassava roots. There are 13 tapioca flour mills. There are two cinemas, one of which has a chair with 1,000 seats, including there is a bus terminus. The famous singer of that era went from Bangkok for shows in here, such as Suraphol Sombatcharoen or Waiphot Phetsuphan. It is considered that the Chak Ngaeo is prosperous before Pattaya and resulting in a mixture of traditional Thai culture and Chinese culture.

Later, Chak Ngaeo has stagnated when Pattaya has prospered respectively. People have migrated to new places.

== Presently ==
Currently, Chak Ngaeo has been promoted as a cultural attraction since 2012 by organization under the Office of the Prime Minister. It is surrounded by two storey traditional wooden shophouses with balconies in consecutive. The center of community is also the site of the Mazu Shrine or Chaomae Thapthim (เจ้าแม่ทับทิม) in Thai, the goddess of the sea, fishery and seafaring according to the belief of Chinese. It is respected by the people in the congregation as well as in neighbouring communities.

Every Saturday from 3 pm until about 9 pm, locals will open the traditional market in the form of pedestrian mall. There are various products available, especially many rare foods both Thai and Chinese food. There is also Chak Ngaeo Rama, the original wooden cinema that remains to the present.

Besides, not far from here there is also another old community Takian Tia (ตะเคียนเตี้ย), a community with a traditional Thai lifestyle.

== Festivals and celebrations ==
- 30 Days before Chinese New Year Celebration
- Birthday of Mazu Celebration
- Mid-Autumn Festival
- Ordination of Guan Yin Festival
- The Communicate with Mazu and Portor Festival
