= Glodok =

Coordinates: 6°09′S 106°49′E

Glodok 裹踱刻 Golodog
- Administrative village
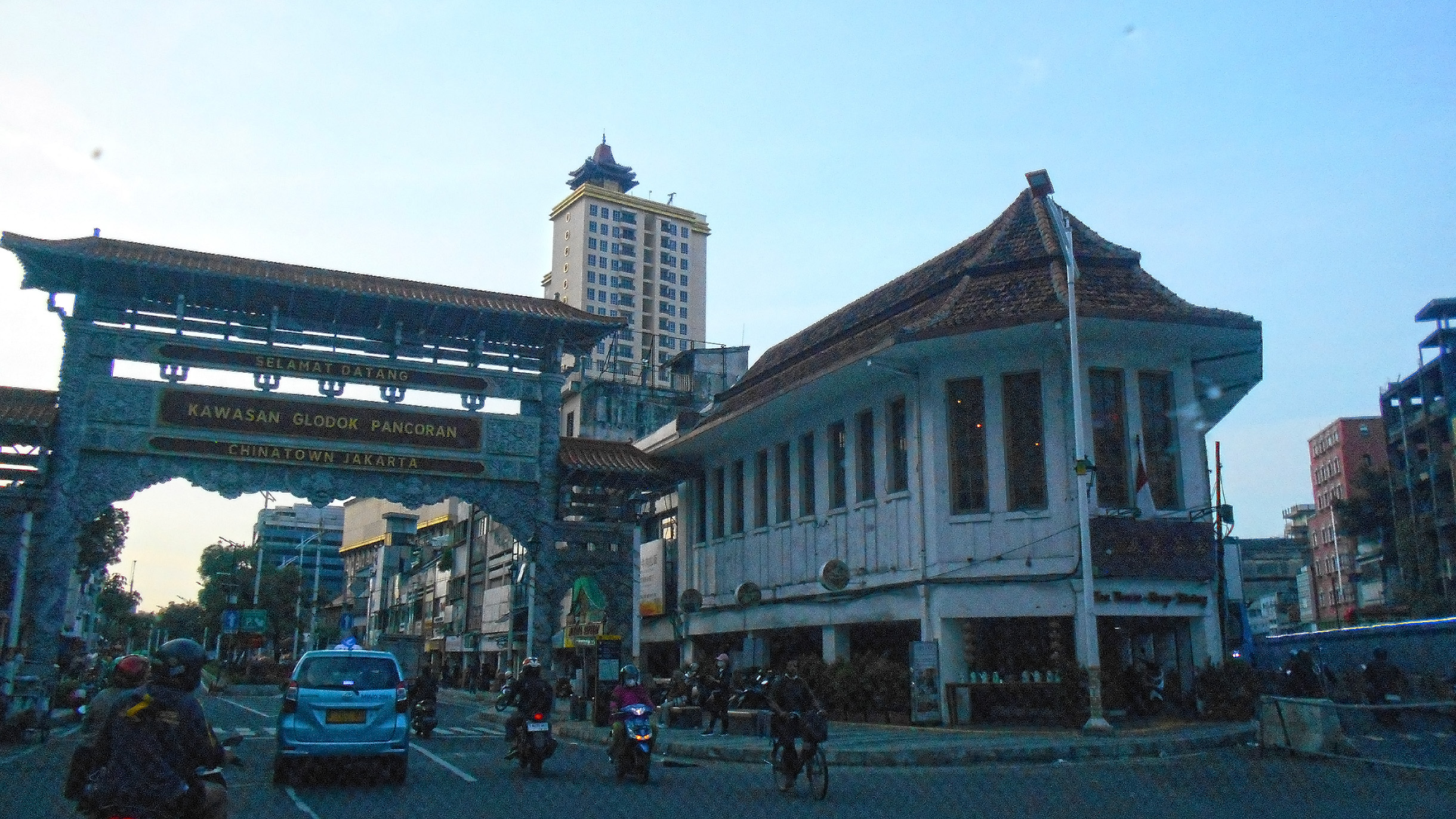
- Glodok Pancoran paifang gate
- Interactive map of Glodok
- Country: Indonesia
- Province: Jakarta
- Administrative city: West Jakarta
- District: Taman Sari
- Postal code: 11120

Glodok (Chinese: 裹踱刻; pinyin: guǒ duó kè) is an urban village of Taman Sari, West Jakarta, Indonesia. The area has been known as a Pecinan, or Chinatown since the Dutch East India Company, designated Glodok as a residential area for ethnic Chinese in November 1740, and is considered the biggest in Indonesia. The majority of the traders and residents of Glodok are of Chinese descent. Administratively, the area is a kelurahan under the Taman Sari district, West Jakarta.

Glodok is one of biggest trading centers for electronic goods in Jakarta.

== History ==
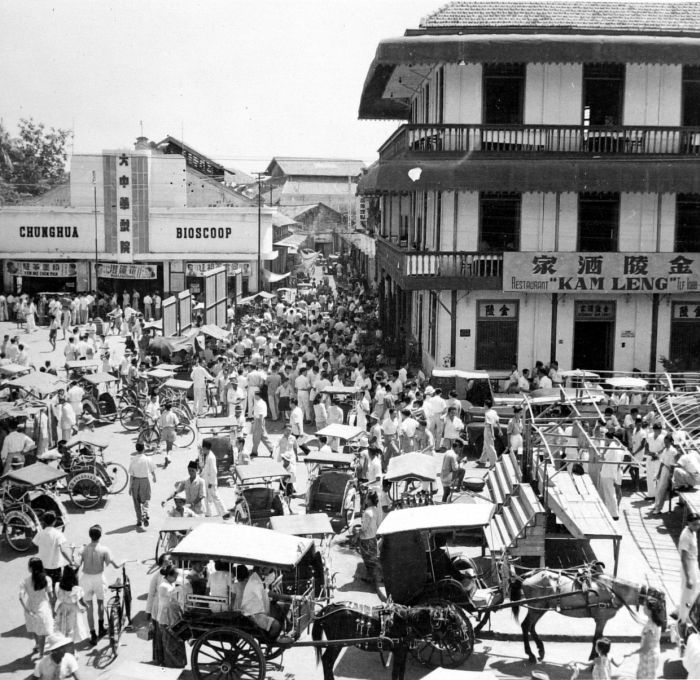
Glodok in 1953.

=== Toponymy ===
The word Glodok came from the Sundanese word "Golodog" (Sundanese script: ᮌᮧᮜᮧᮓᮧᮌ᮪), meaning entrance to a house, as Sunda Kalapa (Jakarta) is the gateway to the ancient Sundanese Kingdom. It was also thought that the name came from the "grojok grojok" sound that water makes coming out of a waterspout in the yard of the Cityhall (Stadhuis), now the Jakarta Museum. A waterspout was built on this site in 1743 and was used for daily needs such as a watering hole for horses.

=== Early history ===
In Batavia (now Jakarta), the Dutch East India Company created commercial opportunities which attracted immigrants from many areas of what is now Indonesia. This economic activity also lured thousands of Chinese people to Java. Swift immigration challenged the city's limited infrastructure and created burdens on the city. Tensions grew as the colonial government tried to restrict Chinese migration through deportations.

=== Recent history ===
On 9 October 1740, 5,000 Chinese were massacred and the following year, Chinese inhabitants were ghettoized in Glodok outside the city walls. In 1998, Glodok was one of the major areas attacked during the May 1998 riots, primarily due to tensions between pribumi and Chinese Indonesians who lived there, who were accused of hoarding the nation's wealth. In 2006, practitioners of Falun Gong were reportedly "assaulted" during a meditation session. A Falun Gong representative suggested that the assailants were sent by the Chinese embassy, though a local news organization noted another possible motivation: that Falun Gong practitioners had been "disrupting business" by distributing pamphlets.

== Attractions ==
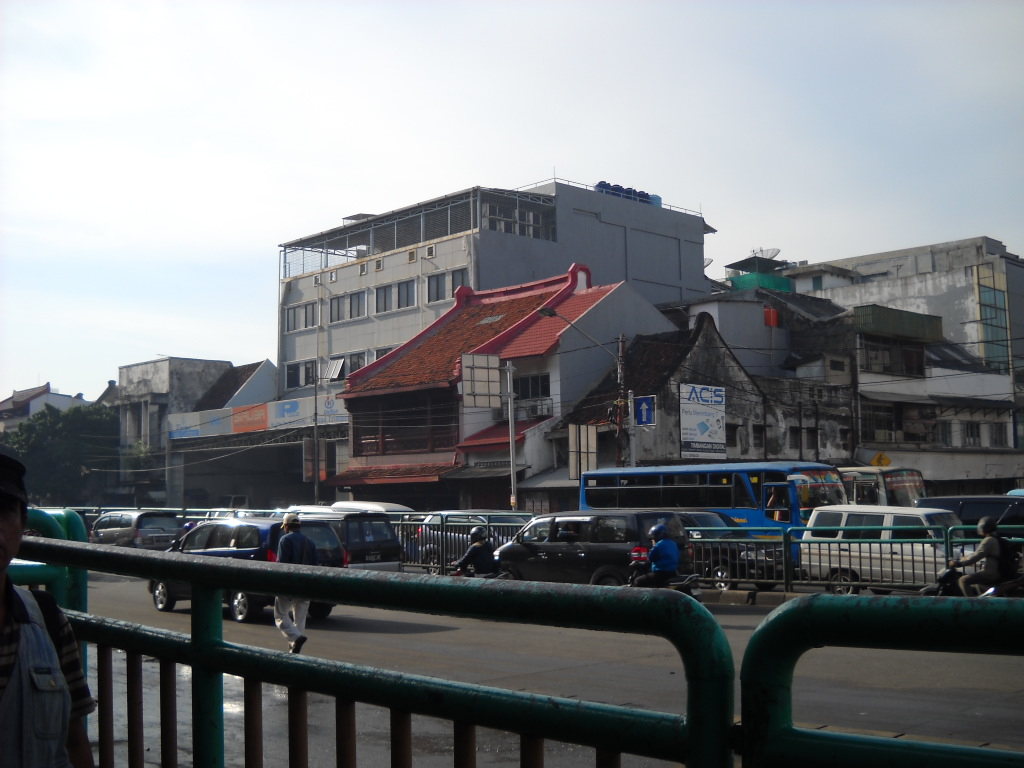
Old Chinese style houses in Glodok

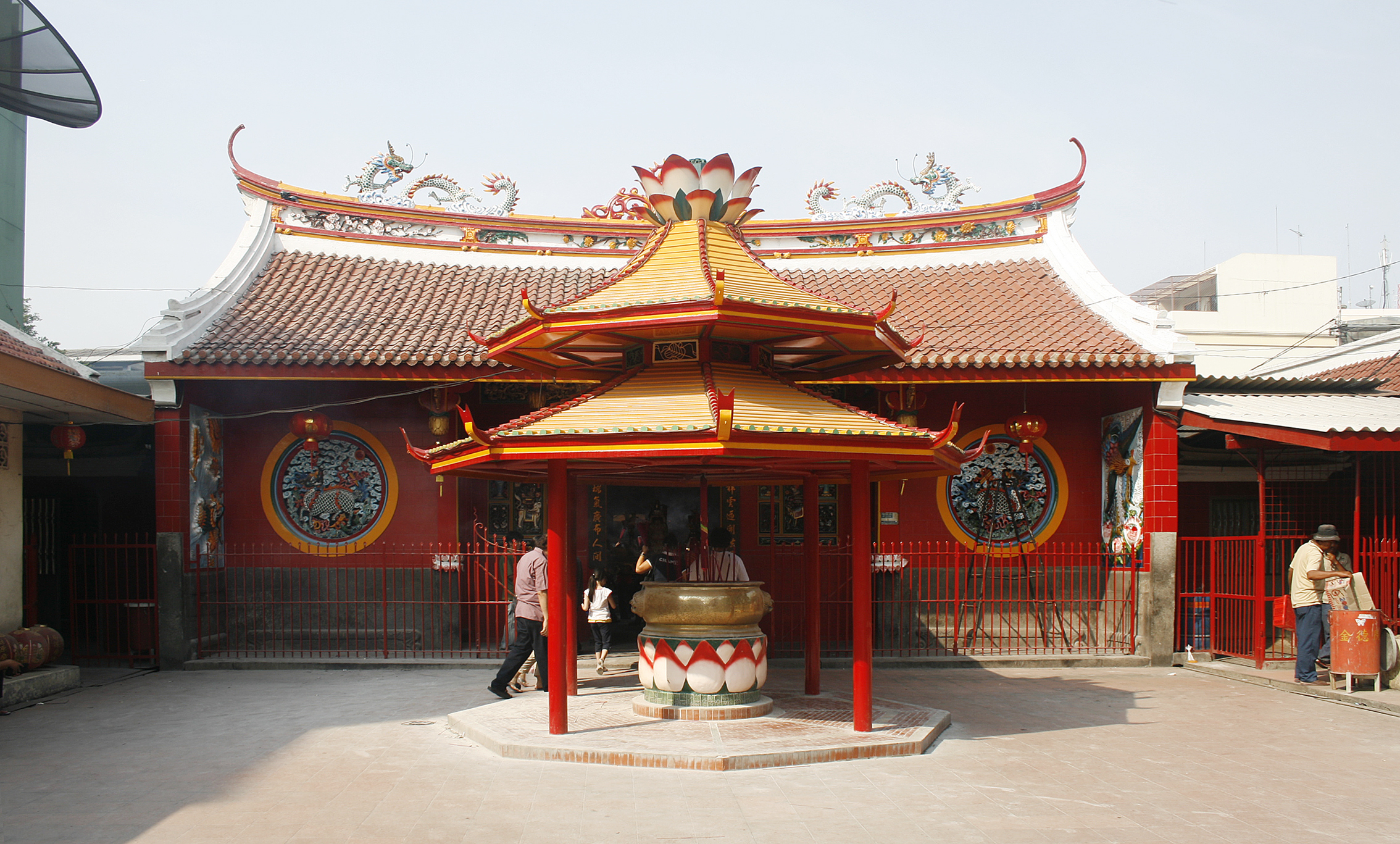
Kim Tek Ie Temple, established in 1650

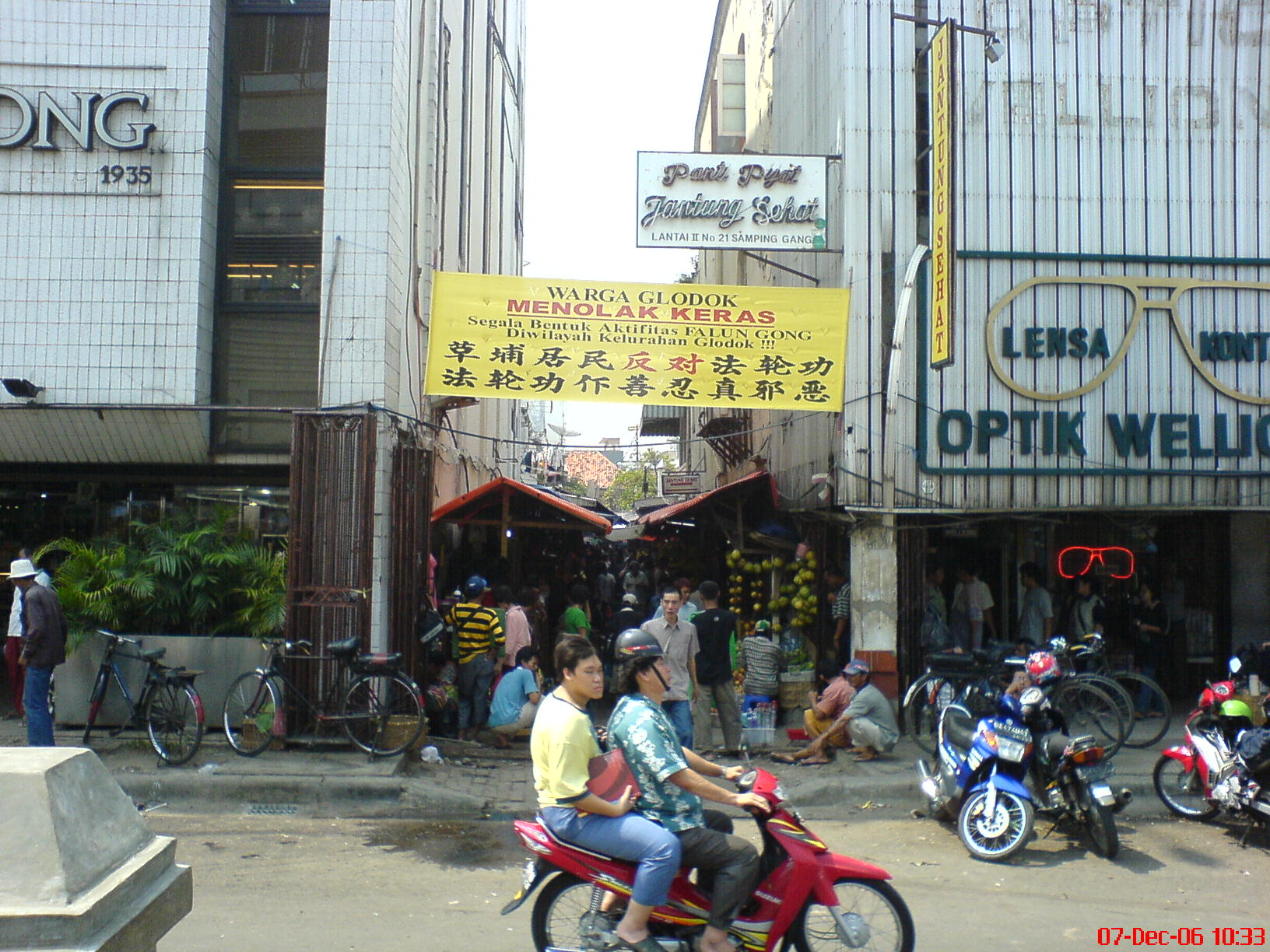
An anti-Falun Gong sign on the streets of Glodok, taken in 2006.

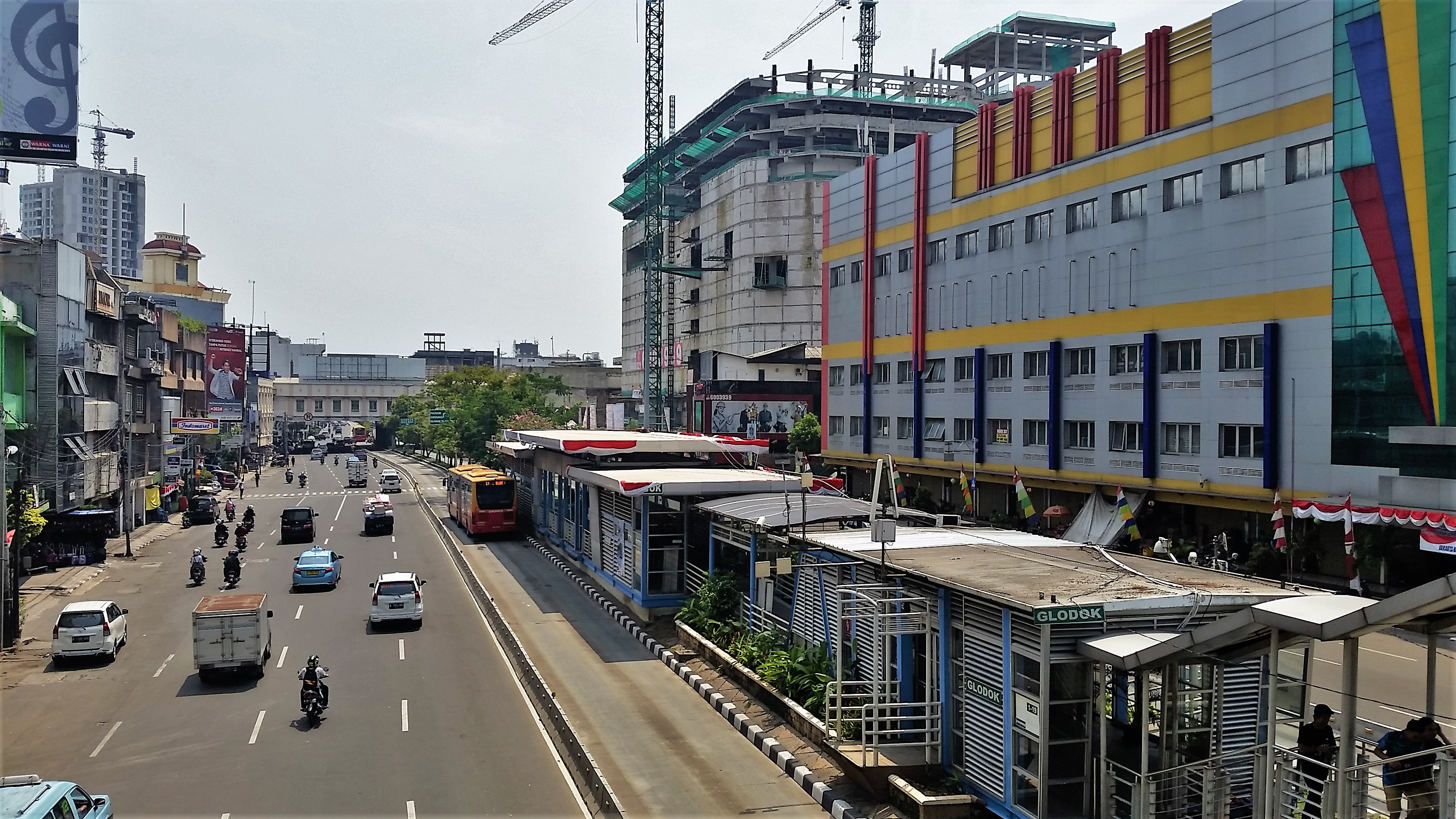
Glodok in 2016.

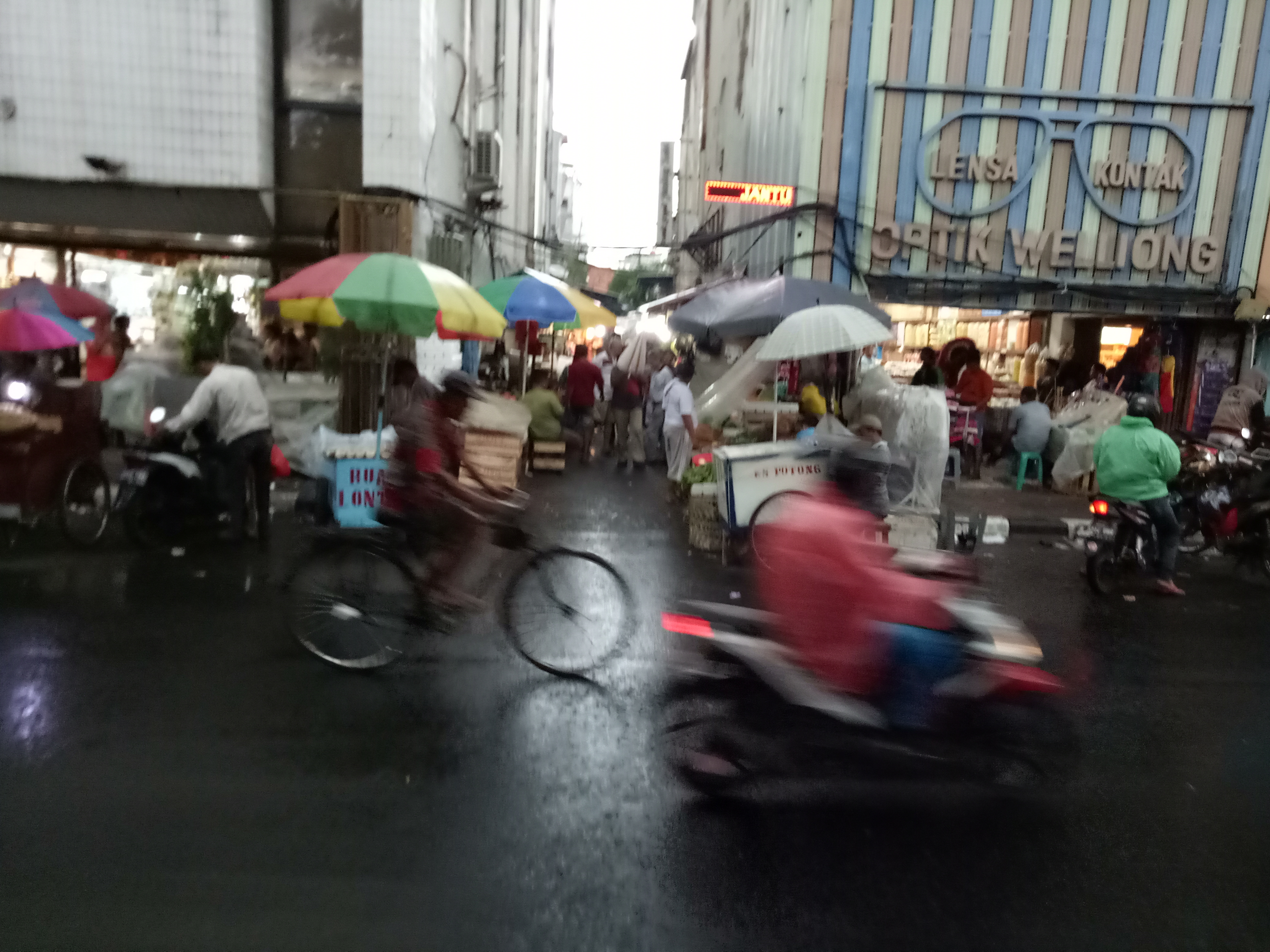
Glodok in 2017.

Religion in Glodok, West Jakarta (2020)
1. Buddhism (42.8%)
2. Protestantism (22.1%)
3. Catholic (15.8%)
4. Islam (19.3%)
5. Hinduism (0.10%)

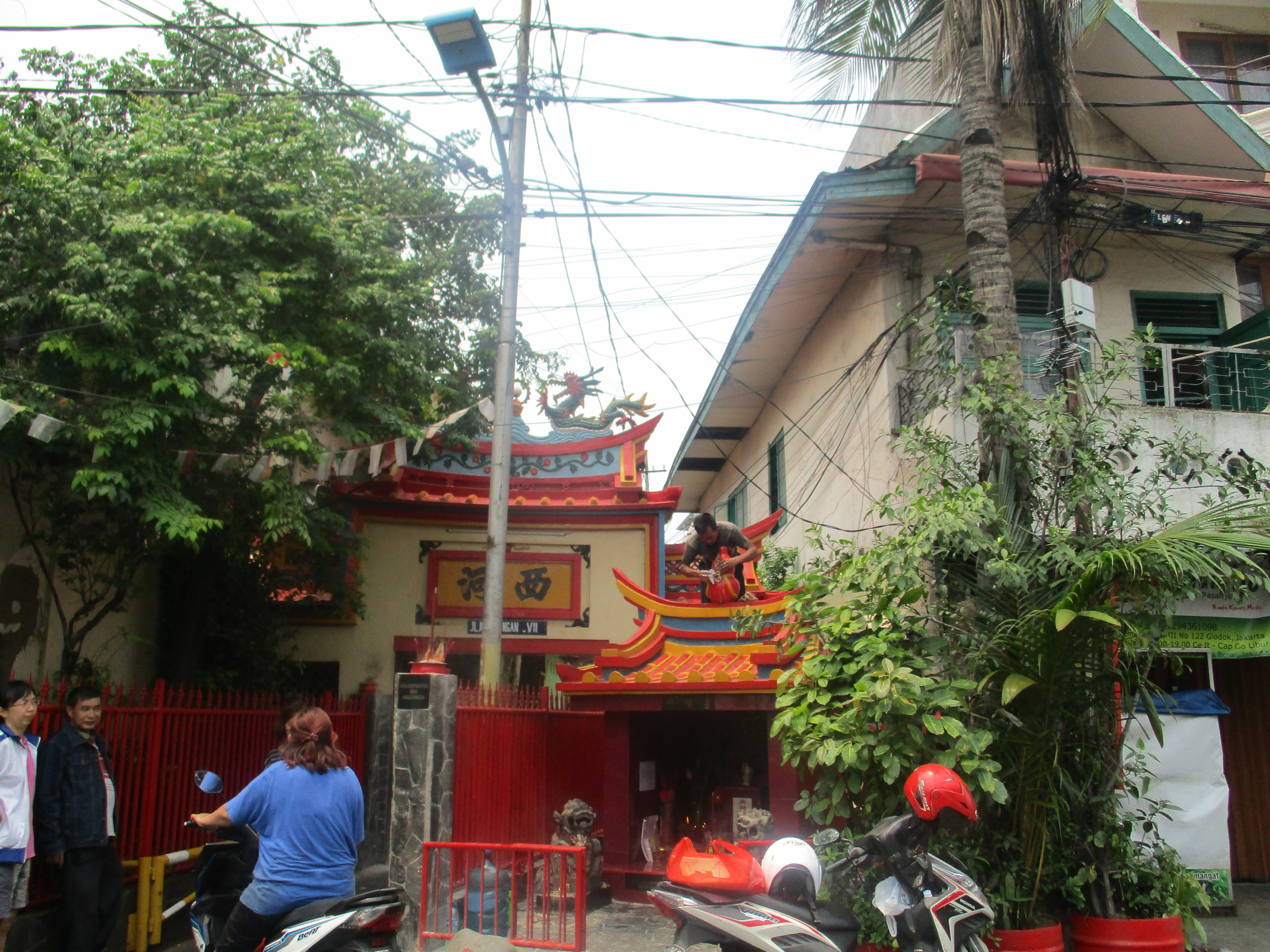
Gate and Earth Deity Shrine at Jalan Kemenangan VII, Glodok.

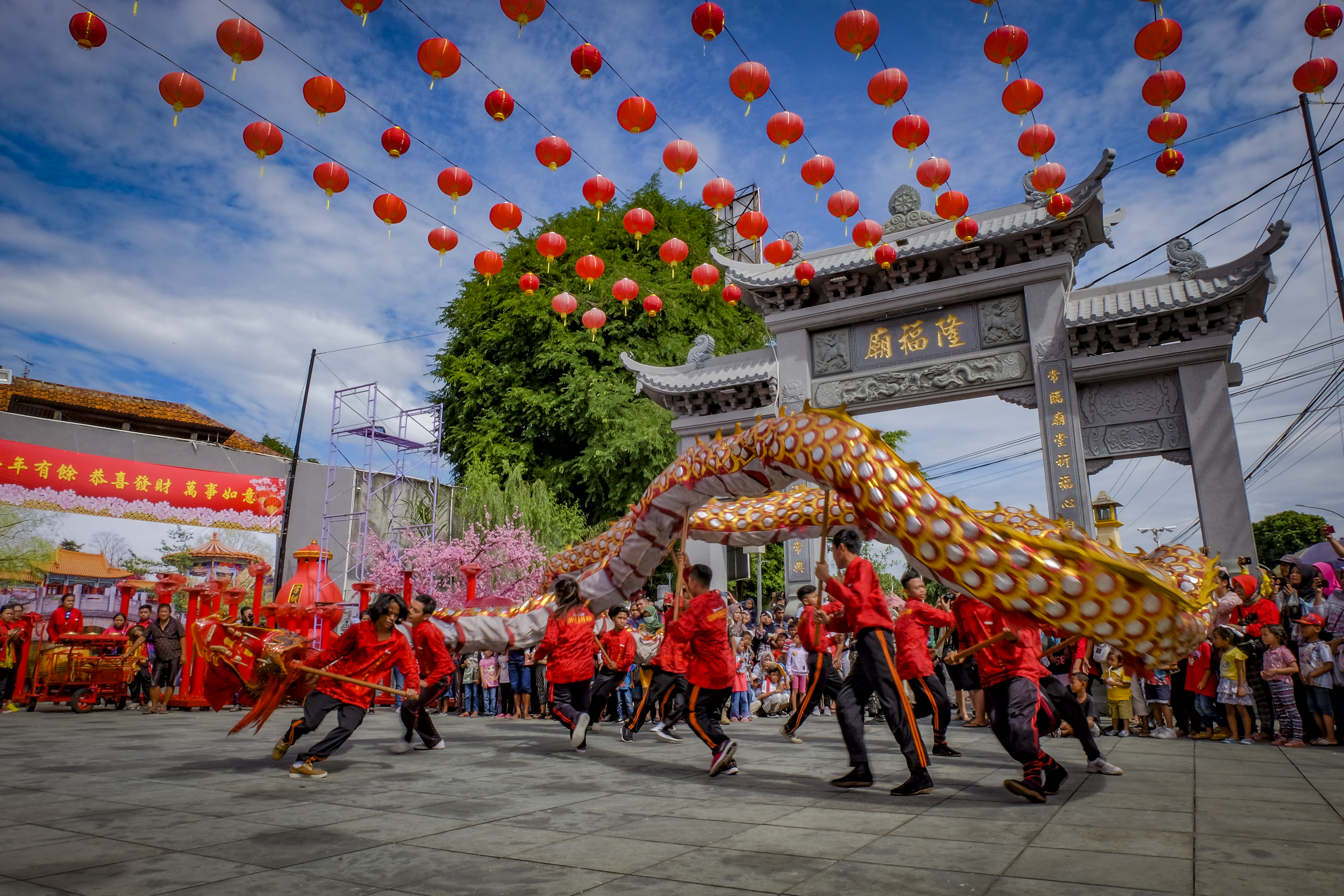
Dragon Dance attraction in Glodok

=== Chinatown ===
As for shopping centre, most of the vendors in Glodok are Chinese Indonesians. Glodok is the biggest Chinatown area in Indonesia, and one of the biggest Chinatowns in the world. The Chinatown covers three main areas, namely Gang Gloria (Gloria alley), Jalan Pancoran and Petak Sembilan. The Chinese came to Jakarta since the 17th century as traders and manual laborers. Most of them came from Fujian and Guangdong provinces in southern China. Centred on Pintu Besar Selatan Road, it has become a commercial hub for the relatively prosperous Chinese community. Assimilation between Chinese and pribumi made a language known as Betawi language. Chinese New Year celebrations and Cap Go Meh celebrations held in the area are major attractions, after president Gus Dur began lifting restrictions in 2000. The area is now a spot to buy Chinese food, traditional Chinese medicine and cheap electronic goods.

=== Shopping ===
Glodok and contiguous of Mangga Dua are one of the biggest shopping centres in Southeast Asia. It stretches from Pancoran street to Gunung Sahari street and has approximately 500,000 m^{2} of shopping centres. Beside sales of electronic consumer goods, Glodok is also the biggest market for original and bootleg audio and video discs.

=== Culinary ===
Other than shopping, Glodok is a spot to buy Chinese food, traditional Chinese medicine and cheap electronic goods. Gang Gloria is a famous place for a wide array of dishes, including gado-gado (mixed vegetables served with peanut sauce), soto betawi (beef cooked in coconut milk), ketupat sayur (rice cakes served with coconut milk and vegetables), sek ba (pork offal stewed in soy sauce) and more. Established in 1927, the legendary Kopi Es Tak Kie coffee shop specializes in iced coffee. Rujak Shanghai Encim (boiled cuttlefish, radish, cucumber, and water spinach with red sauce and peanut sprinkle) this fresh salad was established around 1950s. This kind of dish is very rare, and only able find it at Glodok.

=== Temples and church ===
There are four old temples in the area, namely Dharma Bhakti Temple, Dharma Sakti Temple, Hui Tek Bio temple and Dharma Jaya Toasebio Temple. Kim Tek Ie Temple also known as Dharma Bhakti Temple, which was established in 1650 is the oldest temple in Jakarta. Santa de Fatima Catholic Church, which is built in Chinese architecture located at Jl. Kemurnian III.

=== Demographics ===
In 2016, this subdistrict was inhabited by 8,626 residents consisting of 4,407 men and 4,219 women with a sex ratio of 104.46 and 4,772 heads of families.

Then in terms of religion, the population of this sub-district is also quite diverse. Based on data from the West Jakarta City Central Statistics Agency in 2020, the number of religious adherents in this sub-district was recorded, where Buddhism was 42.8%, then Christianity 37.9% (Protestant 22.1% and Catholic 15.8%), Islam 19, 3%, and a small proportion of Hindus 0.1%.

== Transport ==
There are many bus rapid transit (BRT) and feeder services provided by Transjakarta, where BRT Corridor 1 stops at the Glodok BRT station. Jakarta Kota, Kampung Bandan, Mangga Besar and Jayakarta stations of KRL Commuterline are located adjacent to the area.

== See also ==
- Kim Tek Ie Temple (金德院)
- Chinese Indonesians
- Legislation on Chinese Indonesians
- 1740 Batavia massacre
- 1918 Kudus riot
- May 1998 riots of Indonesia
- Chinatowns in Asia
