= Chinese people in Japan =

中華系日本人
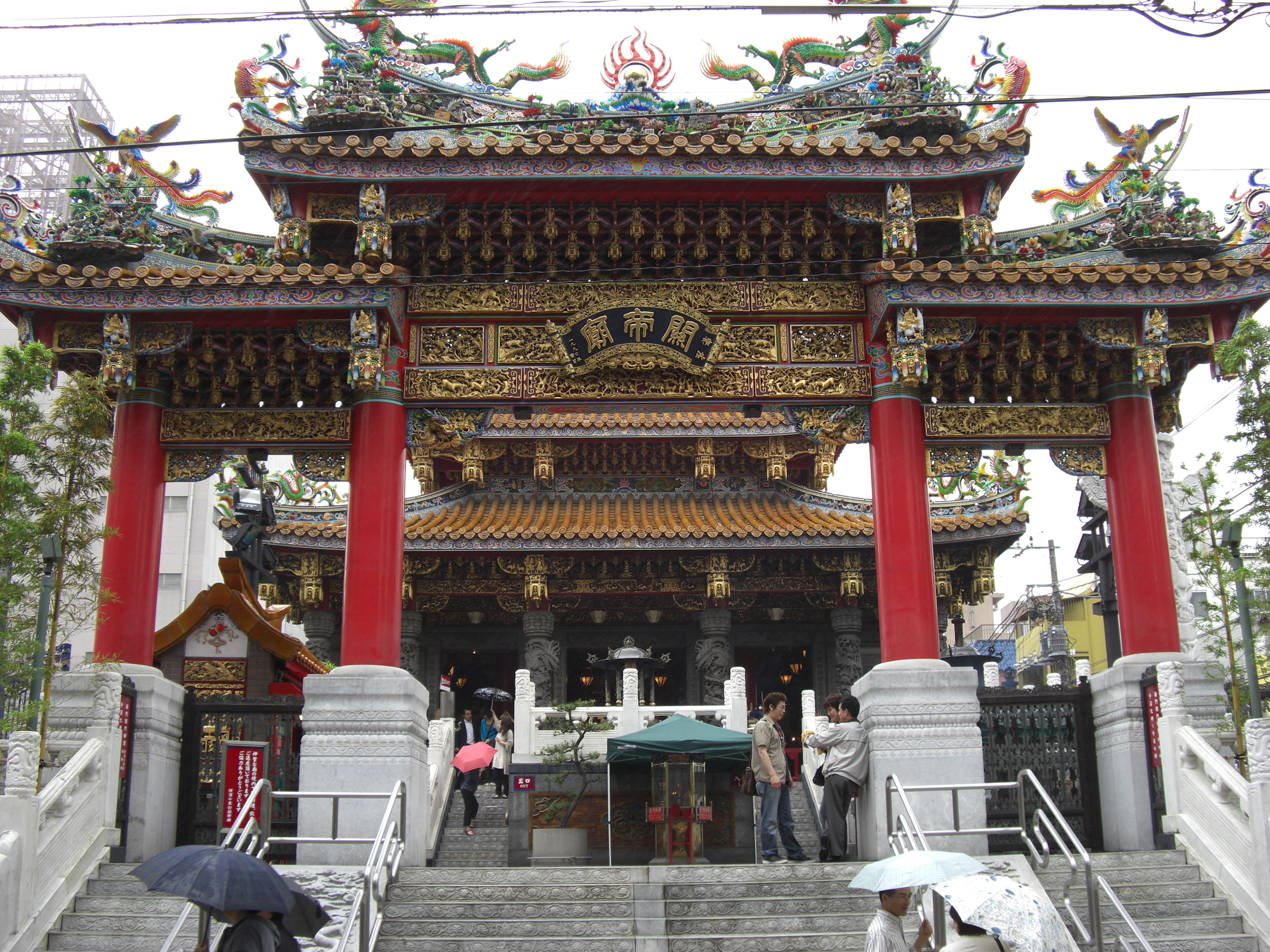
- The front gate of Yokohama Kuan Ti Miao at Yokohama Chinatown

Total population
- 1,200,000 total estimated ethnic Chinese in Japan including 930,428 PRC citizens and 127,223 PRC citizens who have naturalized in Japan since 1989 (2025).: 930,428 PRC citizens living in Japan (in December, 2025); 73,256 ROC citizens living in Japan (in December, 2025)

Regions with significant populations
- Tokyo (Toshima, Shinjuku, Minato, Nishitokyo, Chiyoda, Shibuya, Shinagawa, Nakano, Setagaya), Kanagawa Prefecture (Yokohama), Osaka Prefecture (Osaka), Hyōgo Prefecture (Kobe), Kyoto Prefecture (Kyoto), Aichi Prefecture (Kitanagoya), Shiga Prefecture (Maibara), Fukuoka Prefecture (Chūō-ku)

Languages
- Japanese, Chinese (Mandarin, Fuzhounese, Shanghainese, Cantonese, Hokkien, Hakka, other Chinese languages), English

Religion
- Majority Chinese traditional religion (Confucianism, Taoism), Shintoism, Buddhism, Christianity and non-religious

Related ethnic groups
- Overseas Chinese

Chinese people in Japan

Chinese name
- Traditional Chinese: 日本華僑/華人 在日中國人
- Simplified Chinese: 日本华侨/华人 在日中国人
Transcriptions
Standard Mandarin
- Hanyu Pinyin: rìběn huáqiáo/hūarén zàirì zhōngguórén

Japanese name
- Kanji: 中華系日本人
- Kana: ちゅうかけいにほんじん
Transcriptions
- Romanization: Chūka-kei Nihon-jin

Chinese people have had a long history in Japan and make up the largest foreign minorities in Japan. This includes any Japanese individuals self-identifying as ethnic Chinese or Chinese permanent residents living in Japan. People aged 22 or older cannot possess dual-citizenship in Japan, so Chinese people possessing Japanese citizenship typically no longer possess Chinese citizenship.

== Population and distribution ==
Chinese people in Japan (as of December 2025)
Status of Residence		Number of person
Permanent resident		357,565
Spouse or Child of Permanent resident		21,762
Resident	Student	148,151
Resident	Technical Intern training	22,583
Resident	Dependent	93,581
Resident	Specialist in Humanities / International Services	117,314
Resident	Others	22,105
Spouse or Child of Japanese National		26,617
Long-Term Resident^{*1}		32,047
Special permanent resident^{*2}		610
Total		930,428
*1 Those who are authorized to reside in Japan with a period of stay designated by the Minister of Justice in consideration of special circumstances. *2 A special permanent resident provided for by the Special Act on the Immigration Control of, Inter Alia, Those who have Lost Japanese Nationality Pursuant to the Treaty of Peace with Japan (Act No. 71 of 1991)

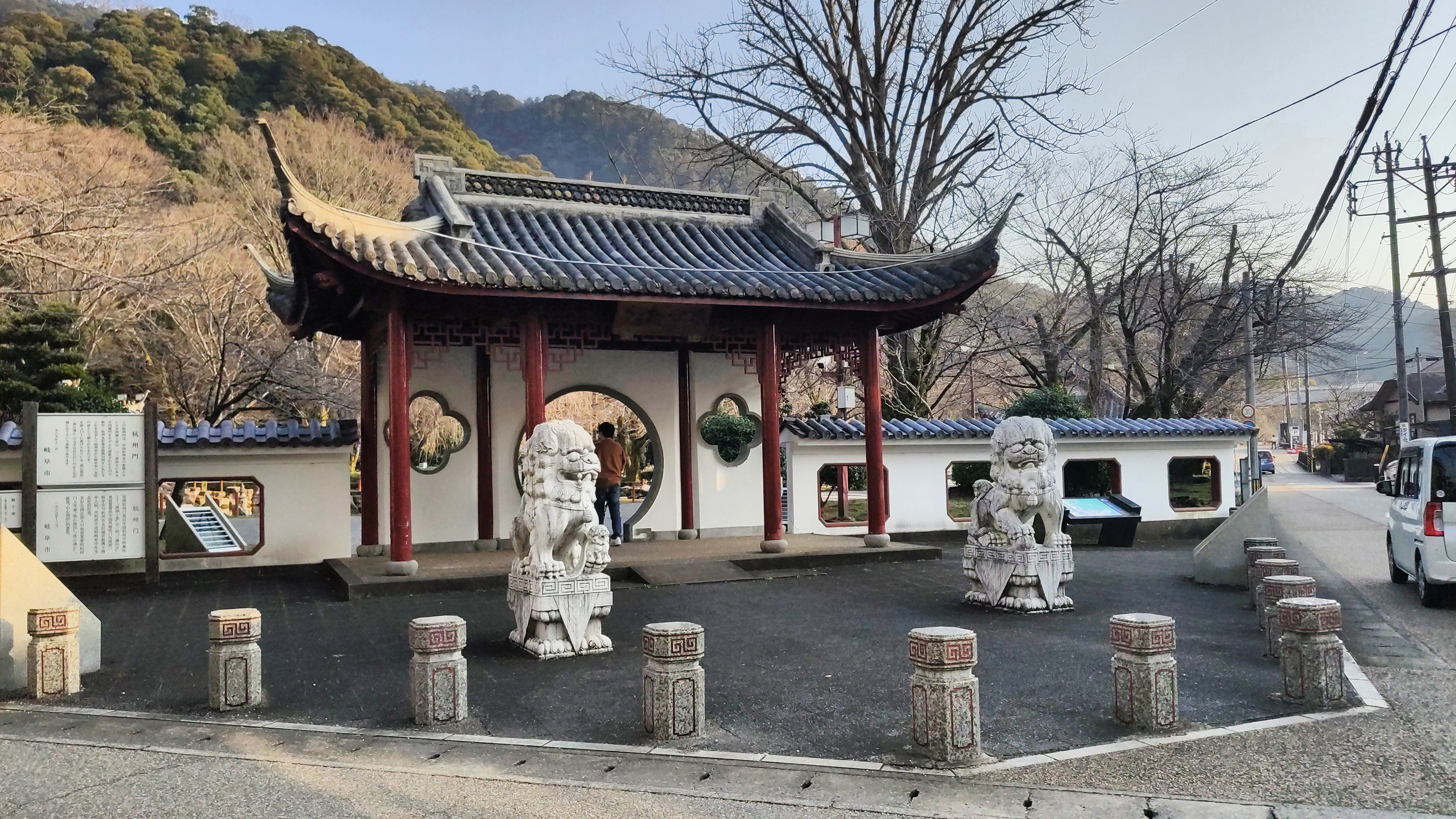
Japan-China Friendship Garden In Gifu

Most Chinese people, or descendants of Chinese immigrants, who are living in Japan reside in major cities such as Osaka, Yokohama, and Tokyo, although there are increasingly also significant populations in other areas as government immigration policies increasingly attract workers to 'training programs', universities seek increasing numbers of international students and Chinese people see business opportunities. Japan's first recognised Chinatown was in Nagasaki, developing in the 1680s when economic prerogatives meant that the shogunate needed to restrict and control trade to a greater extent than previously. Before this, there had been a large number of Chinese communities in the west of the country, made up of pirates, merchants, and people who fitted into both categories. In the 19th century, the well-known Chinatowns of Yokohama and Kobe developed, and they are still thriving today, although the majority of Chinese people in Japan live outside Chinatowns in the regular community. The communities are served by Chinese schools that teach the Chinese language.

The Chinese community has undergone a dramatic change since the PRC allowed more freedom of movement of its citizens, but citizens of Taiwan (ROC), Singapore and Hong Kong nationality are not counted in these figures. A study that was conducted in 1995 estimated that the Chinese population of Japan numbered 150,000, among whom between 50,000 and 100,000 could speak Chinese. In 2000, Japanese governmental statistics revealed that there were 335,575 Chinese people in Japan. Current demographic statistics reveal that these numbers have reached over 600,000 legal immigrants, although there is probably also a significant population, although of unknown number, of undocumented immigrants. A significant number of Chinese nationals are naturalized each year; following naturalization, they are not counted as immigrants in Japanese statistics.

Technical emigration has decreased due to increasing salaries in China as well as Japan's economic stagnation following the Lost Decades. From 2015 to 2023, the number of Chinese people in the technical intern program dropped from 38,327 to 11,347.

== History ==
The chart of the number of foreign residents in Japan by the year 2020.

=== Pre-modern era ===
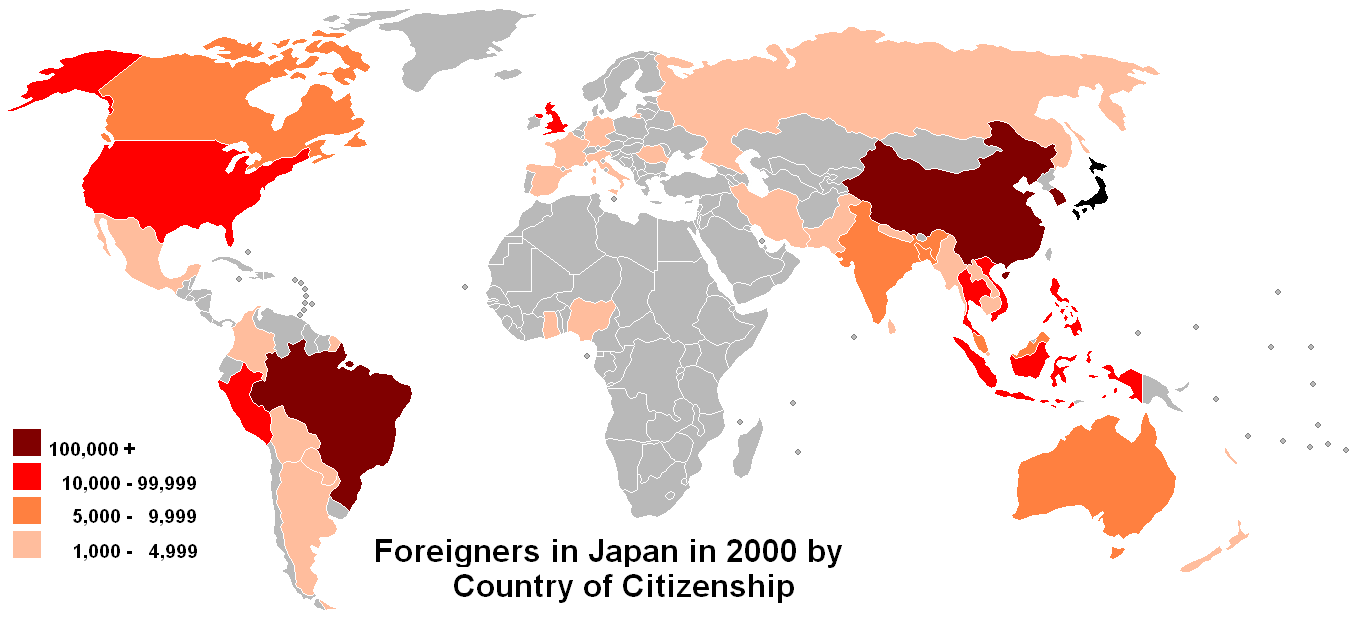
The map of the number of foreigners in Japan by the year 2000.

It is believed that a substantial component of the Yayoi people migrated from China to Japan. The Yayoi people who introduced wet rice cultivation to Japan may have come from Jiangnan near the Yangtze River Delta in ancient China. This is supported by archeological research and bones found in modern southeastern China and western Japan. According to several Japanese historians, the Yayoi and their ancestors, the Wajin, originated in the today Yunnan province in southern China. Suwa Haruo considered Wa-zoku (Wajin) to be part of the Baiyue (百越). It is estimated that Yayoi people mainly belonged to Y-DNA Haplogroup O-M176 (O1b2) (today ~36%), Haplogroup O-M122 (O2, formerly O3) (today ~23%) and Haplogroup O-M119 (O1) (today ~4%), which are typical for East- and Southeast-Asians. Mitsuru Sakitani suggests that haplogroup O1b2, which is common in today Koreans, Japanese and some Manchu, and O1 are one of the carriers of Yangtze civilization. As the Yangtze civilization declined, several tribes crossed westward and northerly, to the Shandong peninsula, the Korean Peninsula and the Japanese archipelago. It is suggested that the linguistic homeland of Japonic is located somewhere in south-eastern or eastern China before the proto-Japanese migrated to the Korean Peninsula and the Japanese archipelago. According to linguist, Alexander Vovin, the urheimat of the Japonic languages may have been located in Southern China. Japanese linguist, Miyamoto Kazuo, instead has suggested a homeland further north in China, around modern Liaoning.

Ambassadorial visits to Japan by the later Chinese dynasties Wei and Jin recorded that the Wajin of Japan claimed to be descendants of Taibo of Wu, traditionally believed to be the founder of Wu. Several scholars in Japan suggested that the Yamato people and the Imperial House of Japan are descendants of the Wu and possibly Taibo. Many Japanese historians also link the early Japanese Yayoi people to the Baiyue tribes that also include the Wu people.

A Chinese legend of uncertain provenance states that Xu Fu, a Qin dynasty court sorcerer, was sent by Qin Shi Huang to Penglai Mountain (Mount Fuji) in 219 BC to retrieve an elixir of life. Xu could not find any elixir of life and was reluctant to return to China because he knew he would be sentenced to death, Xu instead stayed in Japan. Other immigrants are also thought to include major population movements such as that of the Hata clan. The Hata clan claimed to be the descendants of Qin Shi Huang.

According to a study conducted in 2021, a large number of East Asian people with ancestry mainly resembling Han people arrived in Japan around 300 AD during the Kofun period. This group is responsible for 71% of the ancestry in the modern Japanese population.

In 499 CE, a Chinese Buddhist missionary Hui Shen, paid visit to an island east of China known as Fusang, typically identified with modern-day Japan, which was described in the 7th-century Liang Shu.

Master Jianzhen came to Japan in 754 CE, he helped to propagate Buddhism in Japan and introduce the Vinaya with the establishment of Ritsu School. Emperor Shōmu and Empress Kōmyō received their ordination from him and he also established Tōshōdai-ji, he is also an important conductor of Chinese culture with the introduction of Traditional Chinese medicine, Chinese calligraphy and other Tang era cultural relics into Japan.

According to the Shinsen Shōjiroku (815), 163 Chinese aristocratic families lived in the Kinai area of Honshu, around the modern-day Kansai region. These immigrant clans were referred to as Toraijin (渡来人).

Sakanoue no Tamuramaro (坂上 田村麻呂, 758 – June 17, 811) was a court noble, general and shōgun of the early Heian period of Japan. According to the Shoku Nihongi, an official historical record, the Sakanoue clan is descended from Emperor Ling of Han China. The Sakanoue clan's family tree shows that Tamuramaro is a 14th-generation descendant of Ling.

During the Mongol invasions of China, many Chinese refugees fled to Japan. Some of these Chinese refugees became immensely powerful, for example, Mugaku Sogen, a Chinese Zen Buddhist who fled to Japan after the fall of the Song dynasty. After fleeing Japan, Mugaku Sogen became an advisor to the then ruler of Japan, Hōjō Tokimune. The Chinese refugees who fled the Mongols warned the Japanese that the Mongols would also intend to invade Japan. Mugaku Sogen gave a bad report to Tokimune about the barbarity and cruelty of the Mongols after witnessing Mongol soldiers killing his fellow monks at a monastery. This encouraged Tokimune to not pay tribute to the Mongols as the emissaries Kublai Khan sent to Japan demanded, and instead resist the Mongols in their later attempted invasions of Japan. During the second Mongol invasion of Japan, many Chinese soldiers landed in Japan. After the Mongol defeat, the Japanese defenders killed all the Koreans, Mongols, and Jurchen soldiers they found, except for the Southern Chinese, who the Japanese felt had been coerced by the Mongols into joining the attack on Japan. The Southern Chinese soldiers were spared from being killed by the Japanese, but instead forced to become slaves.

During the Ming dynasty, Japan became decentralized without a central government and with many local daimyo reigning the country, in what would be called the Sengoku Period. Many of these daimyo encouraged Chinese immigration to Japan due to their skills and boost to the local economy. Many Chinese communities would be established in Japan, especially on the island of Kyushu. Many Chinese pirates would set up their bases in Japan in order to launch raid and attacks on mainland China as part of the wokou. For example, the powerful Chinese pirate, Wang Zhi, who became known as the "king of the wokou", established his base of operation in Japanese islands, in order to launch raids against the Ming government. Many of the Chinese pirates were supported by Japanese daimyo themselves. Chinese people are also known to have settled in Okinawa during the Sanzan period at the invitation of the Ryukyuan kings; these were high level royal advisors who lived in the village of Kumemura, for example, claim to all be descended from Chinese immigrants.

During the Manchu conquest of China, many Chinese refugees would again flee to Japan to escape Manchu rule. For example, the Chinese scholar, Zhu Zhiyu, was one of the greatest scholars of Confucianism in the Ming dynasty and Edo Japan. Zhu remains the best remembered of the Ming political refugees in Tokugawa Japan and the one who contributed most to Japanese education and intellectual history.

One of the most well-known Chinese folk heroes was the Ming loyalist Koxinga, who conquered the island of Taiwan from the hands of the Dutch, in order to establish the Tungning Kingdom, the last remnant of the fallen Ming dynasty, where he could continue to fight against the Manchu invaders of China. Despite being a Chinese folk hero, Koxinga was actually born in Japan, to a Chinese merchant father and a Japanese mother. Koxinga is still worshiped as a folk deity, especially in Fujian and Taiwan.

=== Modern era ===
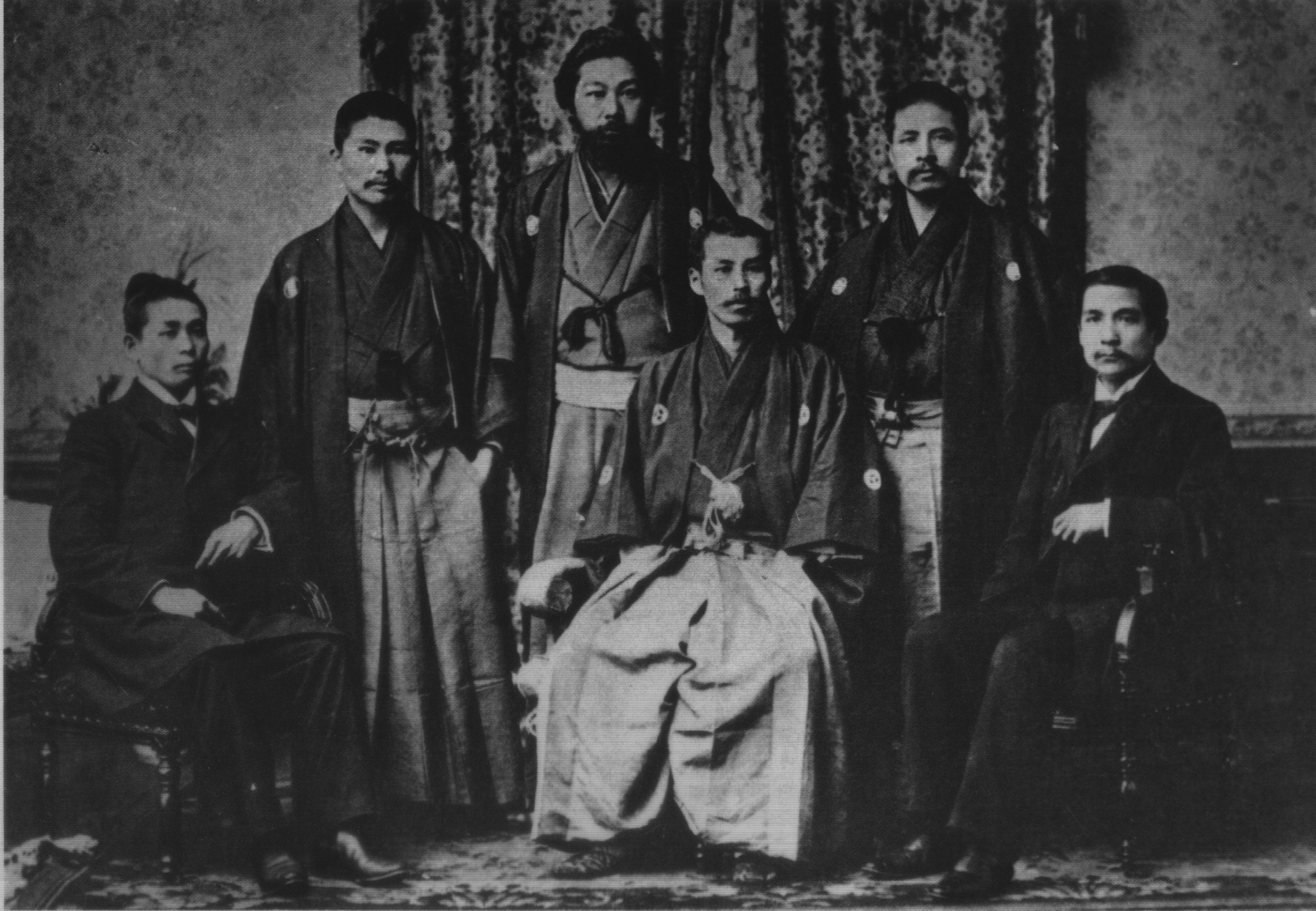
Sun Yat-sen (far right) with Japanese friends in Tokyo, 1900

During the Meiji and Taisho eras, it is estimated that up to 100,000 Chinese students came to study in Japan. Japan was both closer to China culturally and in distance than the American and European alternatives. It was also much cheaper. In 1906 alone, more than six thousand Chinese students were in Japan. Most of them resided in the district of Kanda in Tokyo.

Many leading Chinese intellectuals and political figures have received years of education in Japan, among them Sun Yat-sen, Zhou Zuoren, Lu Xun, Zhou Enlai, and Chiang Kai-shek.

Aside from students and diplomats, Japan was also an ideal destination for Chinese laborers to gain a livelihood, due to the less travel fares and paperworks required. Demand for Chinese labors surged with the booming of Japanese arms industry in the First World War, sparking waves of immigration mainly from Wenzhou and Qingtian in southern Zhejiang to seek employment in Japan. However, when a major earthquake rocked the country in September 1–8th, 1923, a massacre targeted against the Korean and Chinese migrants immediately ensued, and a total of 716 Chinese civilians that were reportedly killed, injured, or declared missing.

Chinese men in general including students and merchants in Japan freely formed relationships with Japanese females, including schoolgirls during the late 19th and early 20th century, and Chinese male peddlers originating from Fuqing in Fuzhou, Fujian province in particular married Japanese women en masse, fathered children with them and took some of them back to Fuqing. Japanese media in the 1920s falsely depicted these relationships in a lurid manner, depicting Japanese girls as getting suckered into relations with Chinese men and demanding they be repatriated back to Japan in the lead up to the Mukden incident.

=== Post-World War II ===
After the normalization of relations between People's Republic of China and Japan in 1972, many Japanese war orphans that were left behind in China after World War II have remigrated to Japan with the assistance of the Japanese government, bringing along their Chinese spouses and children.

The term shin-kakyō (新華僑) refers to people of Chinese descent who immigrated to Japan from Taiwan and mainland China.

The industrial "training scheme" used to bring Chinese workers to Japan has been criticized by lawyers as exploitation, after several deaths.

== Culture ==
=== Cuisine ===
Chinese restaurants in Japan serve a fairly distinct style of Chinese cuisine. Though in the past Chinese cuisine would have been primarily available in Chinatowns such as those in port cities of Kobe, Nagasaki, or Yokohama, Japanese-style Chinese cuisine is now commonly available all over Japan. As Japanese restaurants often specialise in just one sort of dish, cuisine is focused primarily on dishes found within three distinct types of restaurants: ramen restaurants, dim sum houses, and standard Chinese-style restaurants.

551 Horai (551蓬莱), established in the 1945 by Luo Bang Qiang (羅邦強) and two other friends, is a Chinese fast-food chain famous in Japan's Kansai region, especially Osaka, renowned for its fresh, handmade, pork-filled steamed buns (nikuman/butaman), shumai, and gyoza. Stores are often found in transport hubs like airports and train stations.

== Education ==
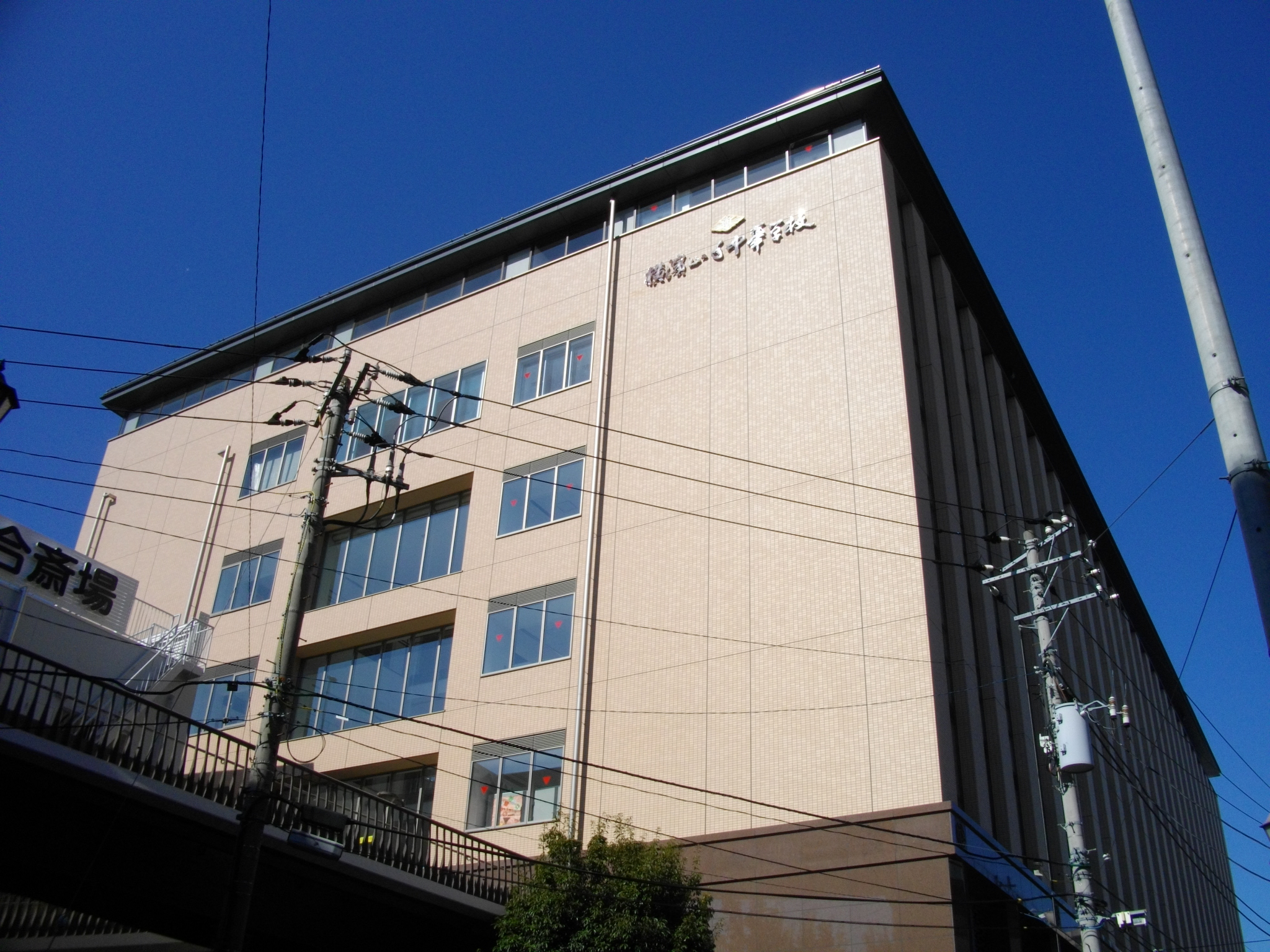
Yokohama Yamate Chinese School

As of 2008 there are five Chinese day schools in Japan: two in Yokohama and one each in Kobe, Osaka, and Tokyo. Three are oriented towards the Republic of China on Taiwan while two are oriented towards mainland China. In Japanese the PRC-oriented schools are called tairiku-kei (continent-style), and the ROC-oriented schools are Taiwan-kei (Taiwan-style). The ROC-oriented schools teach Traditional Chinese and Bopomofo while the mainland-oriented schools teach Simplified Chinese and Hanyu Pinyin. The ROC-oriented schools, by 2008, also began teaching Simplified Chinese.

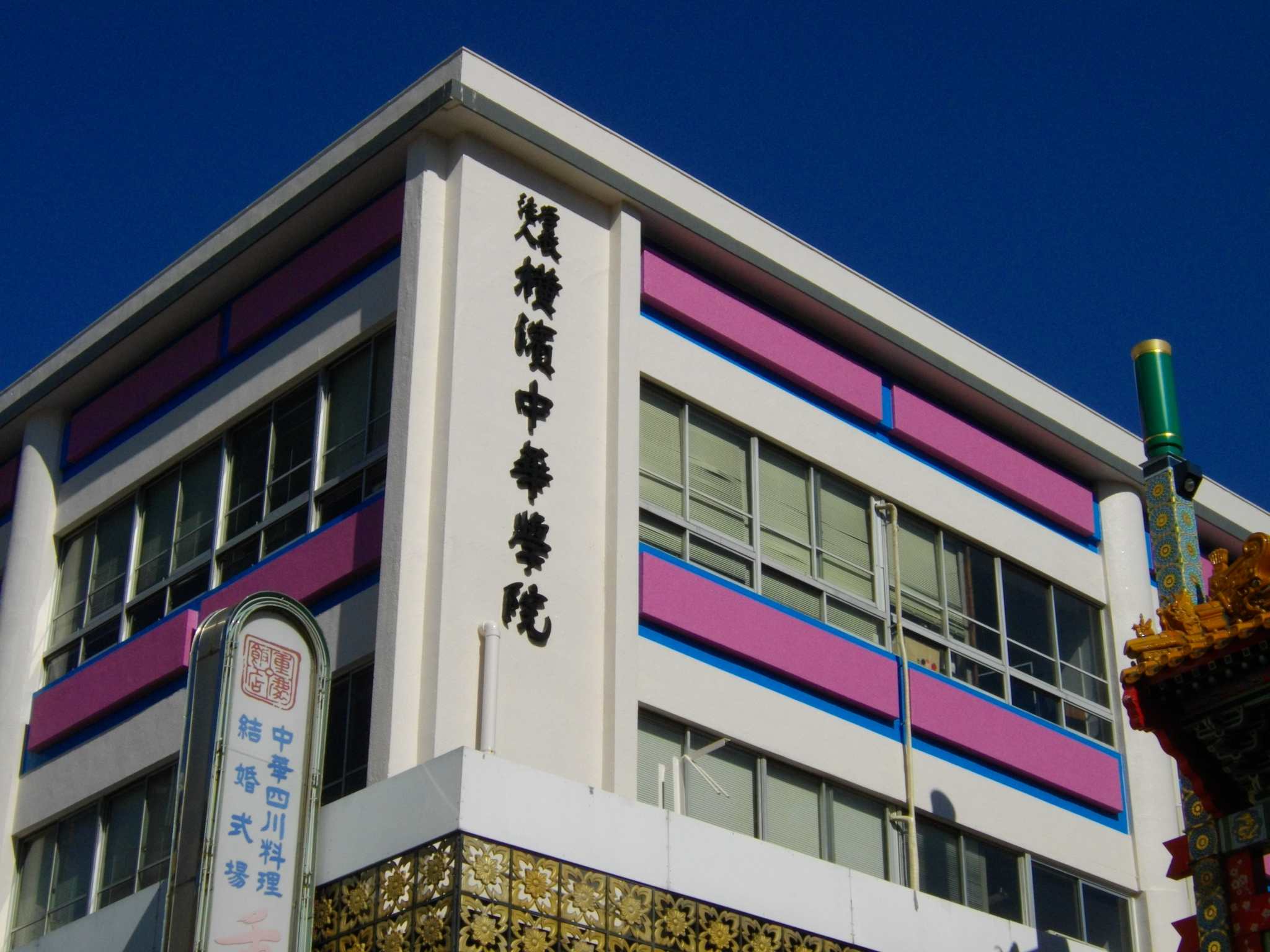
Yokohama Overseas Chinese School

As of 1995 most teachers at these schools are ethnic Chinese persons who were born in Japan. By that year there were increasing numbers of Japanese families sending their children to Chinese schools. Other students at Chinese schools are Japanese with mixed Chinese-Japanese parentage, Japanese children with Chinese parents, and returnees from abroad.

Sun Yat-sen established the Yokohama Chinese School in 1898. In 1952 it split into the mainland-aligned Yokohama Yamate Chinese School and the ROC-aligned Yokohama Overseas Chinese School. The Kobe Chinese School is also oriented towards mainland China. The Osaka Chinese School is located in Naniwa-ku, Osaka. There is also the Tokyo Chinese School.

== Media ==
The Chūnichi Shinpo, a biweekly paper, is published in Chinese and Japanese. The Chūbun and Zhongwen Dabao, both weekly newspapers, and about 28 other Chinese newspapers are published in Tokyo. In addition the Kansai Kabun Jihō, published in Chinese and Japanese, is based in the Osaka area.

== Issues ==
=== Ethnic relations ===
During his time in office, former Tokyo governor Shintaro Ishihara publicly used controversial terms such as sangokujin to refer to Taiwanese Benshengren staying illegally in Japan, and implied that they might engage in rioting and looting in the aftermath of a disaster.

I referred to the "many sangokujin who entered Japan illegally." I thought some people would not know that word so I paraphrased it and used gaikokujin, or foreigners. But it was a newspaper holiday so the news agencies consciously picked up the sangokujin part, causing the problem.

... After World War II, when Japan lost, the Chinese of Taiwanese origin and people from the Korean Peninsula persecuted, robbed and sometimes beat up Japanese. It's at that time the word was used, so it was not derogatory. Rather we were afraid of them.

... There's no need for an apology. I was surprised that there was a big reaction to my speech. In order not to cause any misunderstanding, I decided I will no longer use that word. It is regrettable that the word was interpreted in the way it was.

== Notable individuals ==
This is a list of Chinese expatriates in Japan and Japanese citizens of Chinese descent.

=== Before 20th century ===
- Koxinga or Zheng Chenggong, Prince of Yanping, Chinese Ming loyalist, founder of the House of Koxinga and the first ruler of the Kingdom of Tungning (currently Taiwan); born in Hirado, Hizen Province (currently Hirado, Nagasaki), son of a Chinese father (Zheng Zhilong) and a Japanese mother (Tagawa Matsu)
- Zheng Zhilong, father of Koxinga. Spent time in Japan as a merchant and trader, and married a Japanese woman, Tagawa Matsu, who became the mother of Koxinga
- Denrinbō Raikei, Chinese-born Japanese martial artist, ninja, swordsman, and Yamabushi.
- Ingen, Chinese poet, calligrapher, and monk of Linji Chan Buddhism from China. He is most known for founding the Ōbaku school of Zen in Japan
- Sokuhi Nyoitsu, was a Buddhist monk of the Ōbaku Zen sect
- Mu'an, Chinese Zen monk who followed his master Ingen to Japan in 1654
- Jianzhen, Tang dynasty Chinese monk who helped to propagate Buddhism in Japan
- Mugaku Sogen, prominent Zen Buddhist monk of the 13th century in Japan, an emigre from Song dynasty China
- Zhu Zhiyu, scholar of Confucianism in the Ming dynasty and Edo Japan. Ming political refugee in Tokugawa Japan
- Li Dan (magnate), prominent early 17th century Chinese merchant and political figure
- Wang Zhi (pirate), 16th century merchant and pirate leader, instrumental in the role of introducing Portuguese guns to Japan
- Xu Hai, Chinese pirate leader in the 16th century and one of the commanders of the wokou pirates and smugglers active along the Chinese coast
- Kaiki (minister), was a politician and diplomat of Ryukyu Kingdom. He played an important role in the unification of Ryukyu
- Song Suqing, also known as Sō Sokei from the Japanese pronunciation of his name, was a Chinese-born diplomat of Muromachi and Sengoku period Japan
- Kawaminami Genbei, birth name: Lan Huirong, from Henan, Ming dynasty, China. He was a political refugee from the Ming, and the Tōtsūji (Chinese translator) of the Satsuma domain.
- Tei Junsoku, or Cheng Shunze in Chinese, was a Confucian scholar and government official of the Ryukyu Kingdom. He is known for his contributions to scholarship and education in Okinawa and Japan
- Takamine Tokumei, an Okinawan interpreter. He was ordered to learn harelip surgery and successfully performed the surgery for the grandson of King Shō Tei, Shō Eki, under general anesthesia
- Ō Mō, also known as Wang Mao, was a politician and diplomat of Ryukyu Kingdom
- Sai On, was a scholar-bureaucrat official of the Ryukyu Kingdom, serving as regent, instructor, and advisor to King Shō Kei
- Sai Taku, an aristocrat and bureaucrat in the royal government of the Ryukyu Kingdom. He descended from Cai Xiang, a famous polymath of the Song dynasty. Also the father of Sai On
- Jana Ueekata, an aristocrat and bureaucrat in the royal government of the Ryukyu Kingdom
- Rin Seikō, a scholar-bureaucrat and diplomat of the Ryūkyū Kingdom
- Antony Dainan, one of the 26 Martyrs of Japan (Chinese father)

=== Early 20th century ===
- Chen Kenmin, Sichuan-born chef regarded as the "father of Sichuan cuisine" in Japan and father of Chen Kenichi (born in Yibin, Sichuan Province)
- Go Seigen, professional Go player (Real Name: Wu Qingyuan, born in Minhou County, Fujian, China)
- Shosei Go, professional baseball player (born in Taiwan)
- Shunpei Hashioka, a Japanese-Chinese boxer who competed in the 1936 Summer Olympics
- Rokusuke Ei, Japanese lyricist, composer, author, essayist, and television personality of Chinese descent
- Fu Zaiyuan, Chinese-born entrepreneur and philanthropist who founded the Sansaio Trading Corporation of Japan
- Princess Huisheng, Manchu-Japanese noblewoman. She was born in the Aisin Gioro clan, the imperial clan of the Qing dynasty. She was the elder daughter of Pujie, the younger brother of Puyi, the last emperor of China. Her mother was Hiro Saga, a Japanese noblewoman who married Pujie in 1937.
- Kosei Fukunaga, Manchu-Japanese noblewoman. She was born in the Aisin Gioro clan, the imperial clan of the Qing dynasty. She is the younger daughter of Pujie, the younger brother of the last Chinese Emperor Puyi, and her mother was Hiro Saga, a Japanese noblewoman who was distantly related to Emperor Shōwa
- Yoshiko Kawashima, born Aisin Gioro Xianyu, was a Qing dynasty royal of the Aisin-Gioro clan. They were raised in Japan and served as a spy for the Japanese Kwantung Army and Manchukuo during the Second Sino-Japanese War.
- Hu Lancheng, a Chinese writer and politician served as a propaganda official in the Wang Jingwei regime, the Japanese puppet regime during the Second Sino-Japanese War

=== Late 20th century ===
- Momofuku Ando, founder of Nissin Foods, with Japanese Taiwan origins and ROC citizenship. (Born in Puzi, Chiayi County, Taiwan)
- Koki Ando, the son of Momofuku Ando, the president and the CEO of Nissin Foods
- Chen Kenichi, son of Chen Kenmin, also a Sichuan-style chef and longest-serving participant on Japanese cooking show Iron Chef (born in Tokyo)
- Mo Bangfu, author (born in Shanghai, China)
- Sadaharu Oh, professional baseball player (Chinese Name: Wang Chen-chih; born in Sumida, Tokyo, Japan)
- Zhao Dayu, also known as Tatsuyu Matsuki (松木 達裕), a Chinese coach, businessman and a former international football striker. He was a naturalized citizen of Japan
- Hirokazu Nakaima, Business leader and politician in Okinawa. Nakaima is descended from a Chinese family with the surname of Cai, one of the 36 Han Chinese Kumemura families who moved to Okinawa in 1392
- Kiyuna Tsugumasa, Ryukyuan politician who was active in Taiwan and Okinawa. He was also known by his Chinese style name, Tsai Chang. Born in Honolulu, Hawaii, United States. His ancestor was Sai Ken (蔡堅), a Chinese immigrant from Nan'an, Quanzhou, Fujian
- Keiichi Inamine, a politician who served as the fifth Governor of Okinawa from 1998 until 2006
- Chire Koyama, table tennis player, formerly known as He Zhili (born in Shanghai, China)
- Wei Qingguang, Chinese born table tennis player who later represented Japan and changed his name to Seiko Iseki
- Agnes Chan, pop singer, professor, and writer (born in Hong Kong)
- Lou Zhenggang, artist (born in Heilongjiang)
- Rissei Ō, professional Go player (born in Taiwan)
- O Meien, professional Go player (Real Name: Wang Ming-wan; born in Taipei, Taiwan)
- Rin Kaiho, professional Go player (Chinese Name: Lin Haifeng; born in Shanghai, China)
- Cho U, professional Go player (Chinese Name: Chang Hsu; born in Taipei, Taiwan)
- Chin Shunshin, novelist (born in Kobe, Hyōgo Prefecture, Japan)
- Masayoshi Takanaka, guitarist, composer, and producer (was born to a Chinese father)
- Judy Ongg, actress, singer, author, and woodblock-print artist (born in Taipei, Taiwan)
- Yinling, swimsuit model, race queen, singer and former professional wrestler (Real Name: Yan Yinling; born in Taipei, Taiwan])
- Kimiko Yo, award-winning Japanese actress of Republic of China nationality (born in Yokohama, Kanagawa)
- Keiko Han and Megumi Han, voice actresses, born to Taiwanese parents
- Reika Utsugi, softball player and manager of the Japan women's national softball team, formerly known as Ren Yanli
- Richard Koo, Taiwanese economist living in Japan

=== 21st century ===
- Lee Haku, professional volleyball player (born to Chinese parents)
- Ayaka Matsumoto, professional volleyball player
- Shuka Oyama, professional volleyball player
- Nene Tomita, former professional volleyball player. Her parents were basketball players originally from China
- Tenketsu Harimoto, Chinese-born Japanese professional basketball player
- Asako O, naturalized basketball player
- Hirokane Harima, professional footballer
- Takahiro Ko, professional footballer, son of former Chinese international Gao Sheng (footballer)
- Shinichi Chan, professional footballer, (½ Chinese, ½ Japanese, born in Tokyo)
- Aolin Zhang, professional footballer on Gamba Osaka
- Xia Dalong, professional footballer
- Tam Sheang Tsung, professional footballer
- Tomokazu Harimoto, naturalized table-tennis player, born to Chinese parents
- Yo Kan, table tennis player of Chinese origin
- Shu Arai, table tennis player
- Kaii Yoshida, Chinese-born Japanese table tennis player
- Miwa Harimoto, table tennis player of Chinese descent
- Yui Hamamoto, table tennis player
- Yusuke Masago, Chinese-Japanese professional baseball player
- Haruna Murakami, figure skater
- Ko Reibun, professional Go player
- So Yokoku, professional Go player
- Kentarō Chen, son of chef Chen Kenichi and grandson of Chen Kenmin
- Tatsuo Nomura, software developer born in China with partial Japanese descent
- Tsuyoshi Abe, actor and film director with mixed Chinese-Japanese ancestry
- Natsuki Deguchi, Chinese-Japanese actress and model (born in China; Chinese mother)
- Ron Monroe, Chinese actress and singer based in Japan
- Tenka Hashimoto, television personality
- Rie Oh, a TV sportscaster, daughter of Sadaharu Oh
- Rola Chen, gravure idol (Real Name: Chen Yi, born in Hangzhou, Zhejiang)
- Leena, female model (immigrant; born in Tai'an, Shandong)
- Qian Lin & Li Chun, singers (Qian Lin: born in Hangzhou, Zhejiang/Li Chun: born in Yueyang, Hunan)
- Naomi Watanabe, comedian and actress (born in New Taipei City, Taiwan; Taiwanese mother)
- Kaito Nakahori, composer (½ Chinese, ½ Japanese; born in Chiba Prefecture, Japan)
- Emi Suzuki, female model (immigrant; born in Shanghai, China)
- Wei Son, female model (immigrant; born in Dalian, Liaoning)
- Hana Hishikawa, voice actress (½ Chinese, ½ Japanese; born in Tokyo)
- Akina Homoto voice actress (½ Chinese, ½ Japanese; born in Tottori Prefecture, Japan)
- Maomi Yuki, Japanese entertainer of partial Chinese descent (father is ½ Chinese)
- Aya Yamane, Japanese voice actress and singer
- Huang Hao, Chinese-born CEO and influencer who starred as the Bachelor in Season 4 of The Bachelor Japan (2021)
- Takeshi Kaneshiro, actor, singer (born in Taipei, Taiwan; Taiwanese mother)
- Kaito Nakahori, Chinese-Japanese composer of contemporary classical music
- Dan Liu, Hong Kongese and Japanese Canadian fashion designer
- Renhō, politician (Taiwanese father)
- Hei Seki, politician, serving as member of the House of Councillors
- Wang Zhi'an, a Japan-based Chinese journalist
- Zheng Yongshan, murderer (born in China)

== See also ==
- Kwantung Leased Territory
- Dalian
- Lüshunkou
- Japanese missions to Imperial China
- Japanese missions to Sui China
- Japanese missions to Tang China
- Japanese missions to Ming China
- Tokyo Mazu Temple
- Yokohama Ma Zhu Miao
- Kumemura
- Chinatown
- Chinatowns in Asia
  - Yokohama Chinatown
  - Kobe Chinatown
  - Nagasaki Chinatown
  - Ikebukuro Chinatown
- Anti-Japanese sentiment in China
- Anti-Chinese sentiment in Japan
- Japanese orphans in China
- Japanese people in China

== Sources ==
- Jansen, Marius B. (1970). The Japanese and Sun Yat-sen. Stanford University Press. ISBN 978-0-8047-0700-8.
- Kerr, George H. (2000). Okinawa: The History of an Island People. Tuttle Publishing. ISBN 978-0-8048-2087-5.
- Kreiner, Josef; Mohwald, Ulrich; Olschleger, Hans-Dieter (2004). Modern Japanese Society. Brill Academic Publishers. pp. 240–242. ISBN 978-90-04-10516-4.
- Maher, John C. (1995). "The kakyo: Chinese in Japan". Journal of Multilingual and Multicultural Development. 16 (1–2): 125–138. doi:10.1080/01434632.1995.9994596.
- Refsing, Kirsten (2003). "In Japan, but not of Japan". In Mackerras, Colin (ed.). Ethnicity in Asia. Routledge. ISBN 978-1-134-51517-2.
- Schottenhammer, Angela (2012). "The "China Seas" in world history: A general outline of the role of Chinese and East Asian maritime space from its origins to c. 1800". Journal of Marine and Island Cultures. 1 (2): 63–86. Bibcode:2012JMICu...1...63S. doi:10.1016/j.imic.2012.11.002.
- Soderberg, Marie; Reader, Ian (2000). Japanese Influences and Presences in Asia. United Kingdom: Routledge. ISBN 978-0-7007-1110-9.
