= Japanese School of Beijing =

International school in Beijing, China

- 北京日本人学校

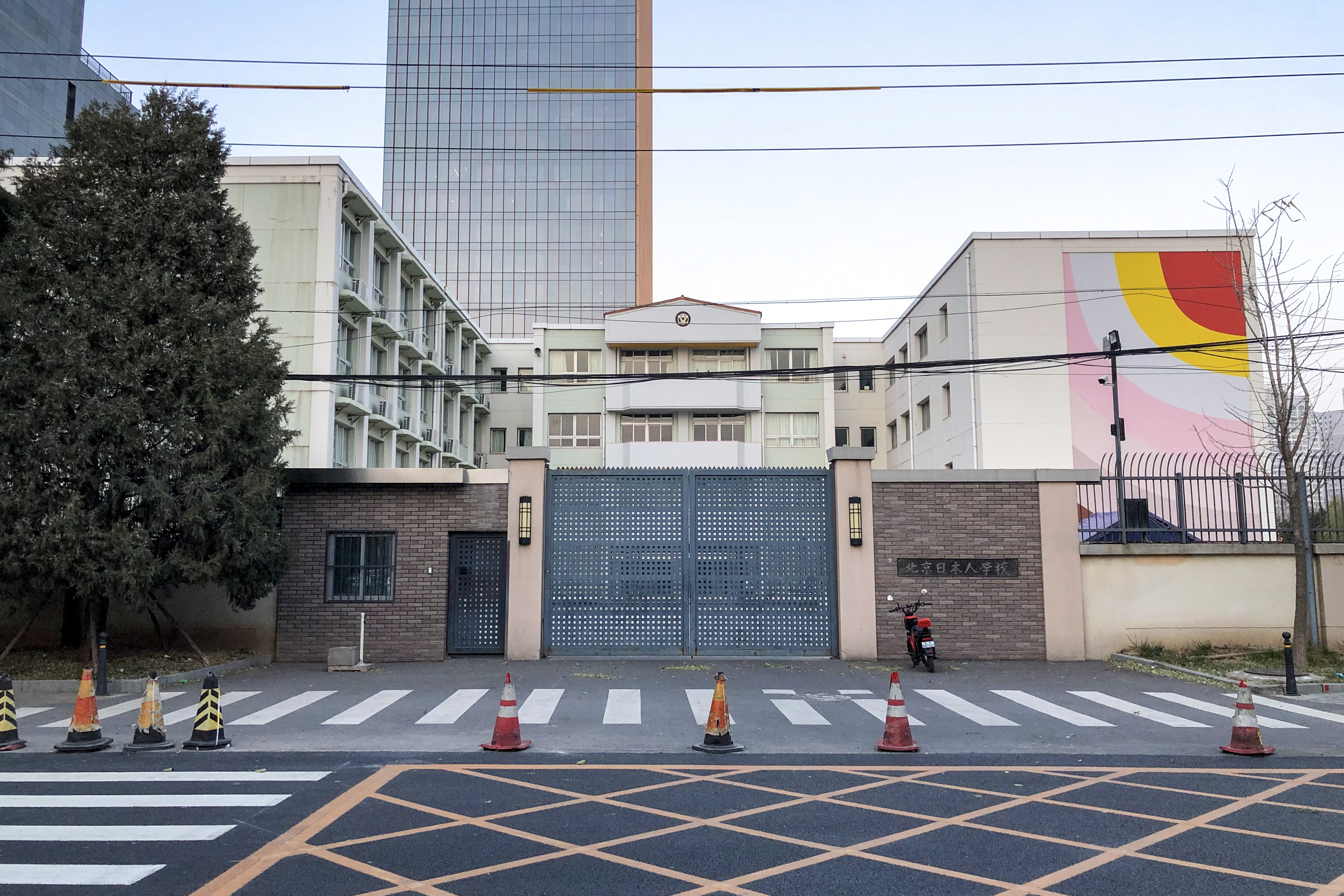

Location
- 6 Jiangtai West Road, Chaoyang Dist., Beijing, China, 100096; 39°58′24″N 116°28′13″E

Information
- Website: jsb-cn.com

Japanese School of Beijing

Chinese name
- Simplified Chinese: 北京日本人学校
- Traditional Chinese: 北京日本人學校
Transcriptions
Standard Mandarin
- Hanyu Pinyin: Běijīng Rìběnrén Xuéxiào

Japanese name
- Kanji: 北京日本人学校
Transcriptions
- Romanization: Pekin Nihonjin Gakkō

Japanese School of Beijing (JSB) is a Japanese education day school in Chaoyang District, Beijing. The students are children of diplomats, businesspeople, and workers in foreign institutions. The school currently has approximately 640 students. It is only open to Japanese students.

The school was founded in 1974, making it one of the oldest international schools in Beijing.

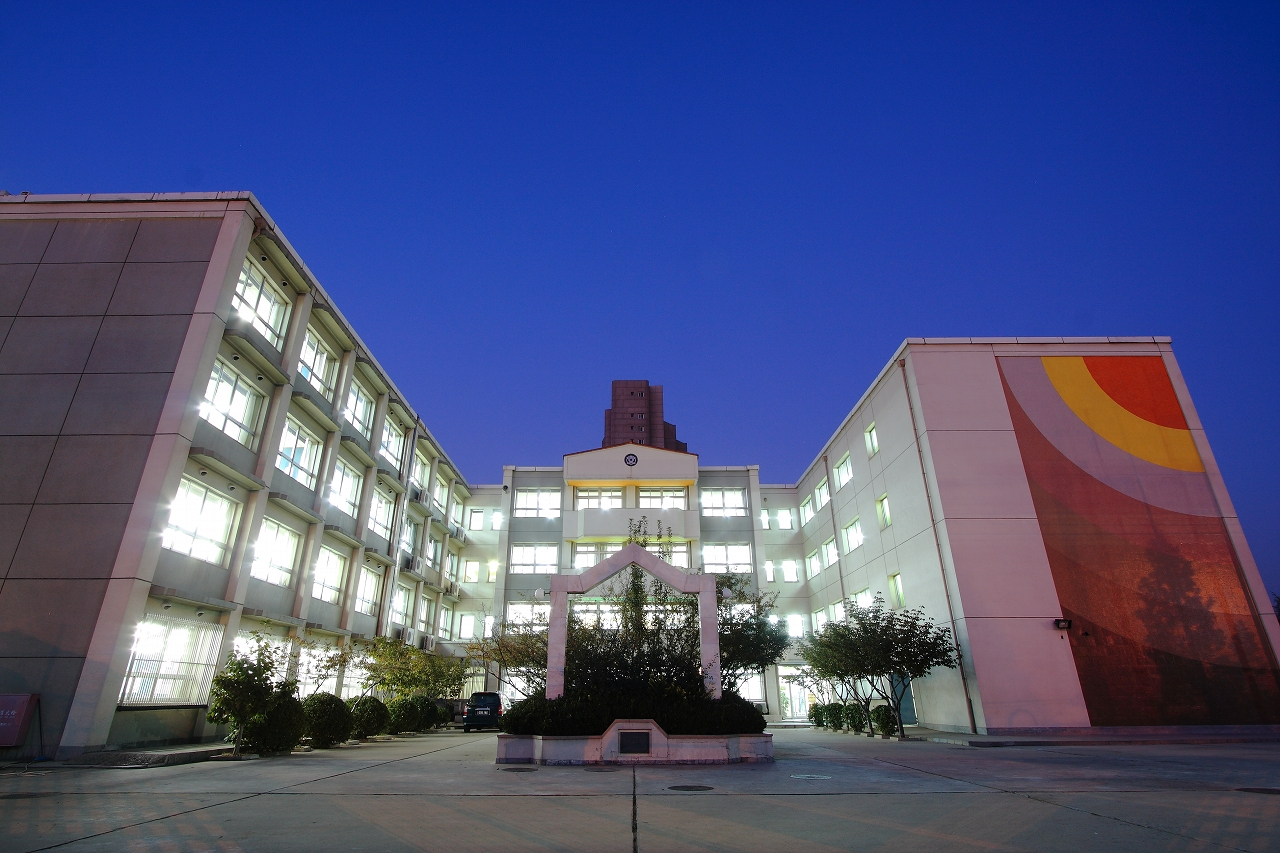
Alternative view of the School

It was formerly known in English as The Japanese School of Peking.

== See also ==
- Japanese people in China

Mainland China-aligned Chinese international schools in Japan:

- Kobe Chinese School
- Yokohama Yamate Chinese School
