= Korea University (disambiguation) =

Korea University (고려대학교) most commonly refers to a private university in South Korea.

- Korea University Anam Campus is the main campus in Seoul. The main portion of the campus is located in Anam-dong, Seoul
- Korea University Sejong Campus is a campus mainly in Sejong

Korea University (조선대학교) may also refer to:

- Korea University (Japan), a private university-level miscellaneous school affiliated by pro-North Korea Chongryon and located in Kodaira, Tokyo
