= Chinese Japanese =

Chinese Japanese or Japanese Chinese may refer to:

- Sino-Japanese vocabulary, Japanese vocabulary that originated in the Chinese language or in elements borrowed from Chinese
- Kanbun, classical Chinese language as written in Japan
- Sino-Japanese relations
- Chinese people in Japan
- Japanese people in China

== See also ==
- Chinese people in Japan
- Japanese people in China
- Japanese orphans in China
