= Daya District =

District in Taichung, Taiwan

Daya 大雅區 Daiga
- District
- Daya District
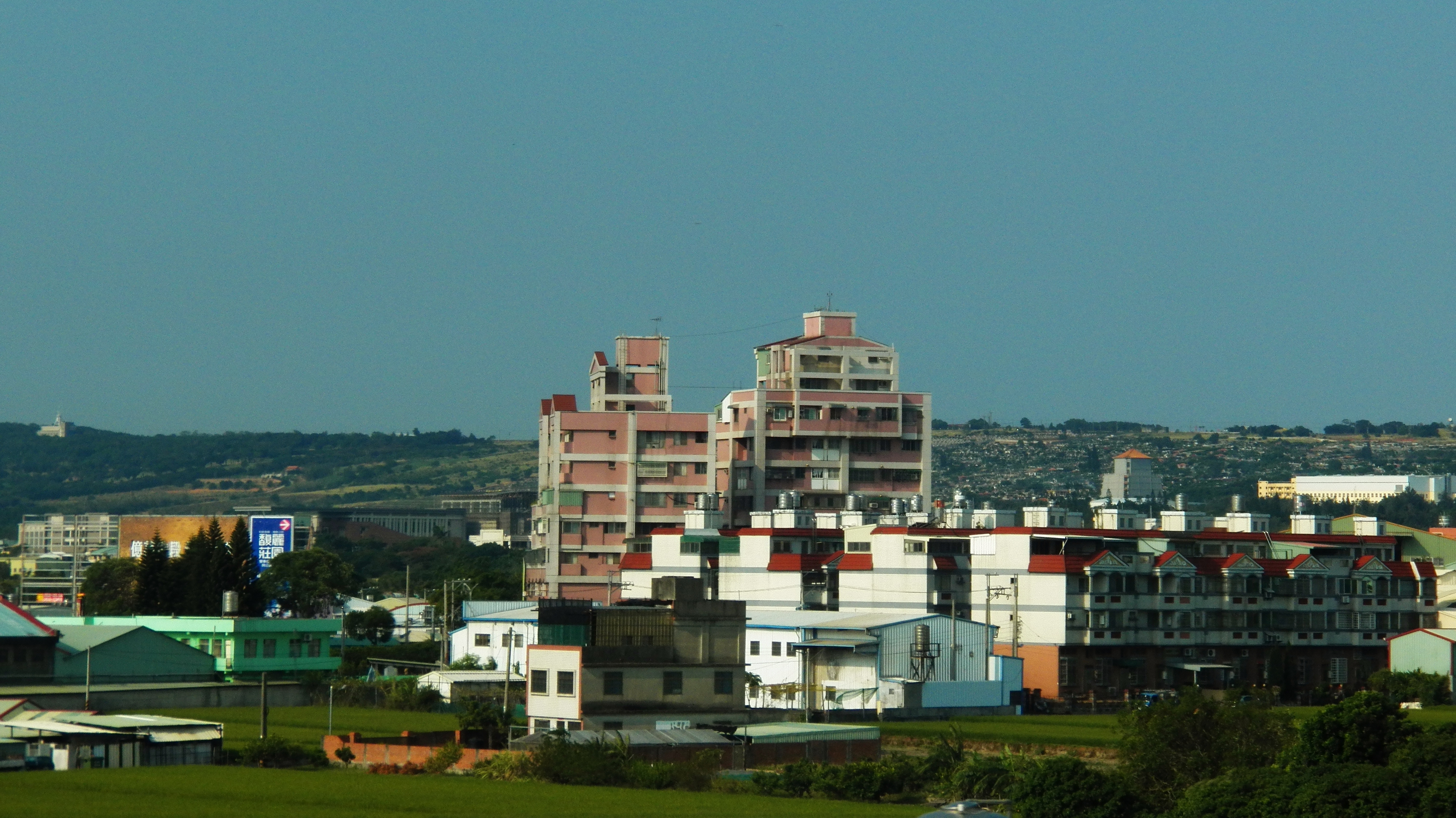

- Daya District in Taichung City
- Coordinates: 24°13′N 120°39′E
- Country: Taiwan
- Special municipality: Taichung
- Established (District): 2010

Area
  - Total: 32.4109 km^{2} (12.5139 sq mi)

Population (February 2023)
  - Total: 95,431
  - Density: 2,944.4/km^{2} (7,626.0/sq mi)
- Time zone: UTC+8 (CST)
- Website: www.daya.taichung.gov.tw (in Chinese)

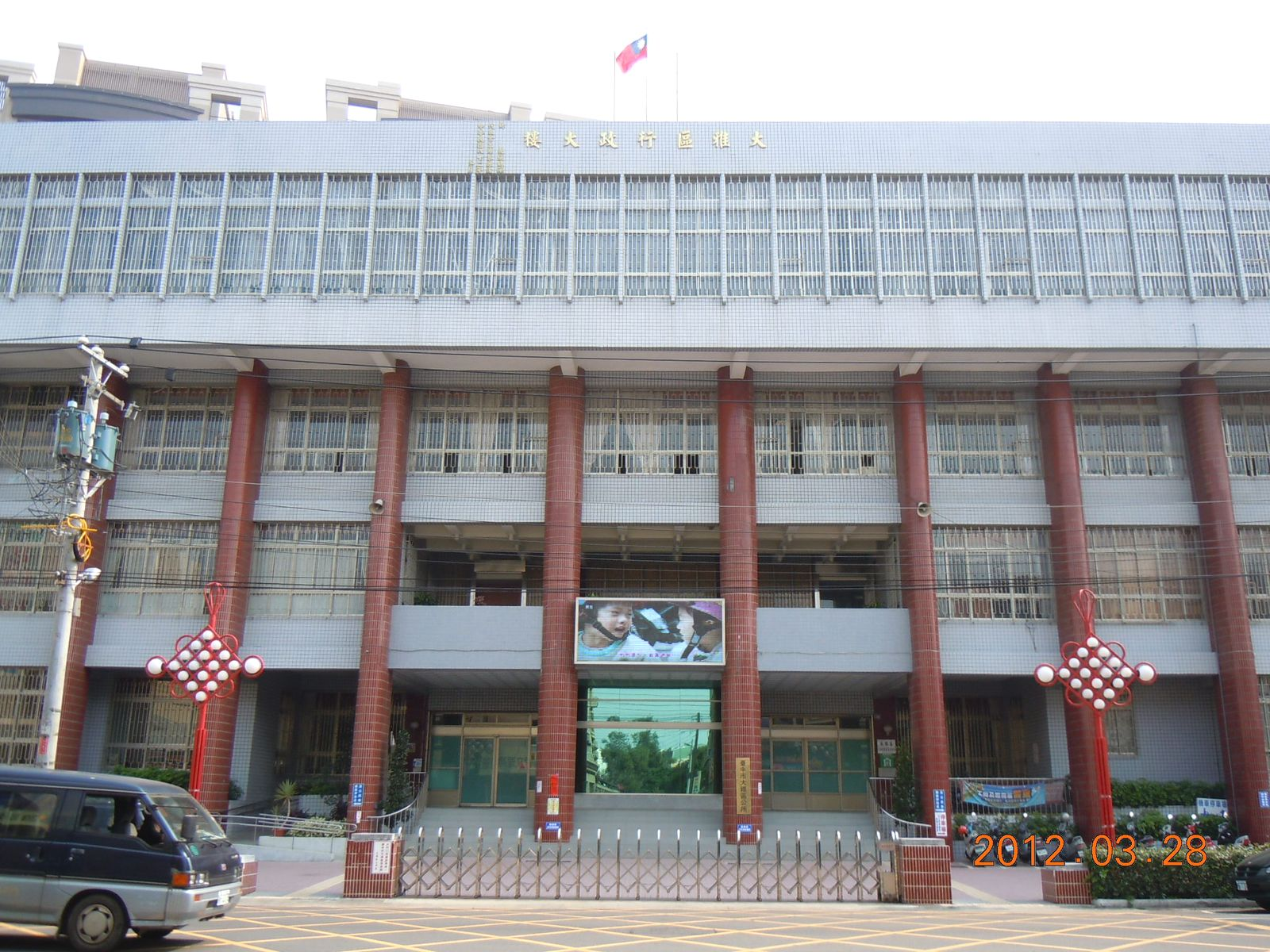
Daya District Office

Daya District (Chinese: 大雅區; pinyin: Dàyǎ Qū; Tâi-lô: Tāi-ngé) is a suburban district in Taichung, Taiwan.

== Administrative divisions ==
Shangya, Daya, Wenya, Sanhe, Erhe, Side, Xibao, Shangfeng, Dafeng, Yafeng, Yuanlin, Liubao, Xiushan, Hengshan and Zhongyi Village.

== Native products ==
- Job's Tears
- Wheat, the only place in Taiwan to grow wheat

== Tourist attractions ==
- Ching-Chuang-Kang Military Base
- Ever Spring Museum
- Maple Scenery of Daya
- Qian-Xing Hall
- Sanhe Park
- Yong-Xing Temple
- Zhangs' Residence of Xiushan
- Zhao Family's Pottery

== Education ==
- Taichung Japanese School

== Notable natives ==
- Lulu Huang Lu Zi Yin, television host, singer and actress
