= Taipei Japanese School =

Japanese international school in Taipei

- 台北日本人学校 台北市日僑學校

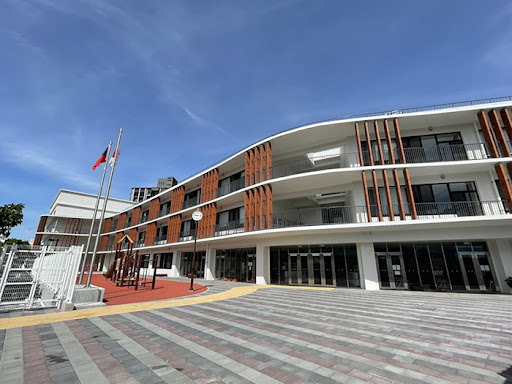

Location
- No. 785, Section 6, Zhongshan North Road, Shilin District, Taipei City, Taiwan 111 台北市士林区中山北路6段785号 臺北市士林區中山北路六段785號; Taipei; Taiwan

Information
- Type: Japanese international school
- Established: 1947
- Principal: Hirotoshi Kondo (近藤裕敏)
- Enrollment: 768 (as of April, 2020)
- Website: www.tjs.tp.edu.tw

Taipei Japanese School

Chinese name
- Traditional Chinese: 台北市日僑學校
- Simplified Chinese: 台北市日侨学校
Transcriptions
Standard Mandarin
- Hanyu Pinyin: Táiběishì Rìqiáo Xuéxiào

Japanese name
- Kanji: 台北日本人学校
Transcriptions
- Romanization: Taibei Nihonjin Gakkō

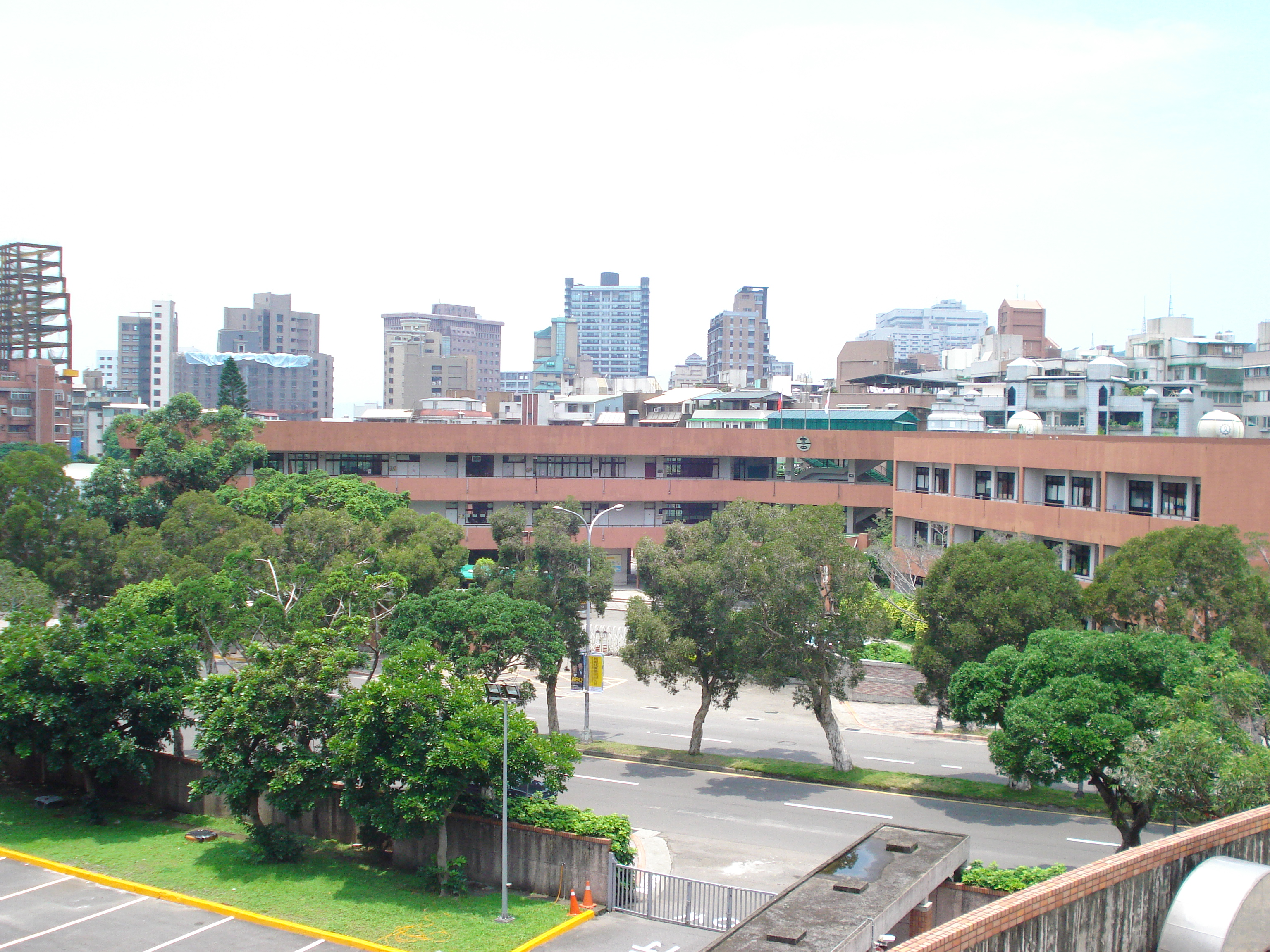
The former TJS campus as seen from Taipei American School

Taipei Japanese School (TJS) is a Japanese international school located in Shilin District, Taipei. TJS was established in 1947 and mainly serves the children (up to junior high school) of Japanese expatriates in Taiwan.

Traditionally, TJS students have returned to Japan to commence their high school education, while a minority choose to attend Taipei American School, which is located across the street. Among the TJS students who chose the latter option was Taiwanese-Japanese actor Takeshi Kaneshiro. TJS moved to its current location in Tianmu in 1983.

With the departure of many Japanese expatriate families from Taiwan during the 1990s, TJS saw its enrollment decline significantly between 1990 and 2010. However, enrollment began to bounce back by the 2010s.

== Notable alumni ==
- Takeshi Kaneshiro, actor
- Yuriko Ishida, actress
- Hikari Ishida, actress
- Asei Kobayashi, composer

== See also ==
Republic of China-aligned Chinese international schools in Japan:

- Osaka Chinese School
- Tokyo Chinese School
- Yokohama Overseas Chinese School
