= Taichung Japanese School =

Japanese international school in Daya District, Taichung, Taiwan

- 台中日本人学校 台中市日僑學校

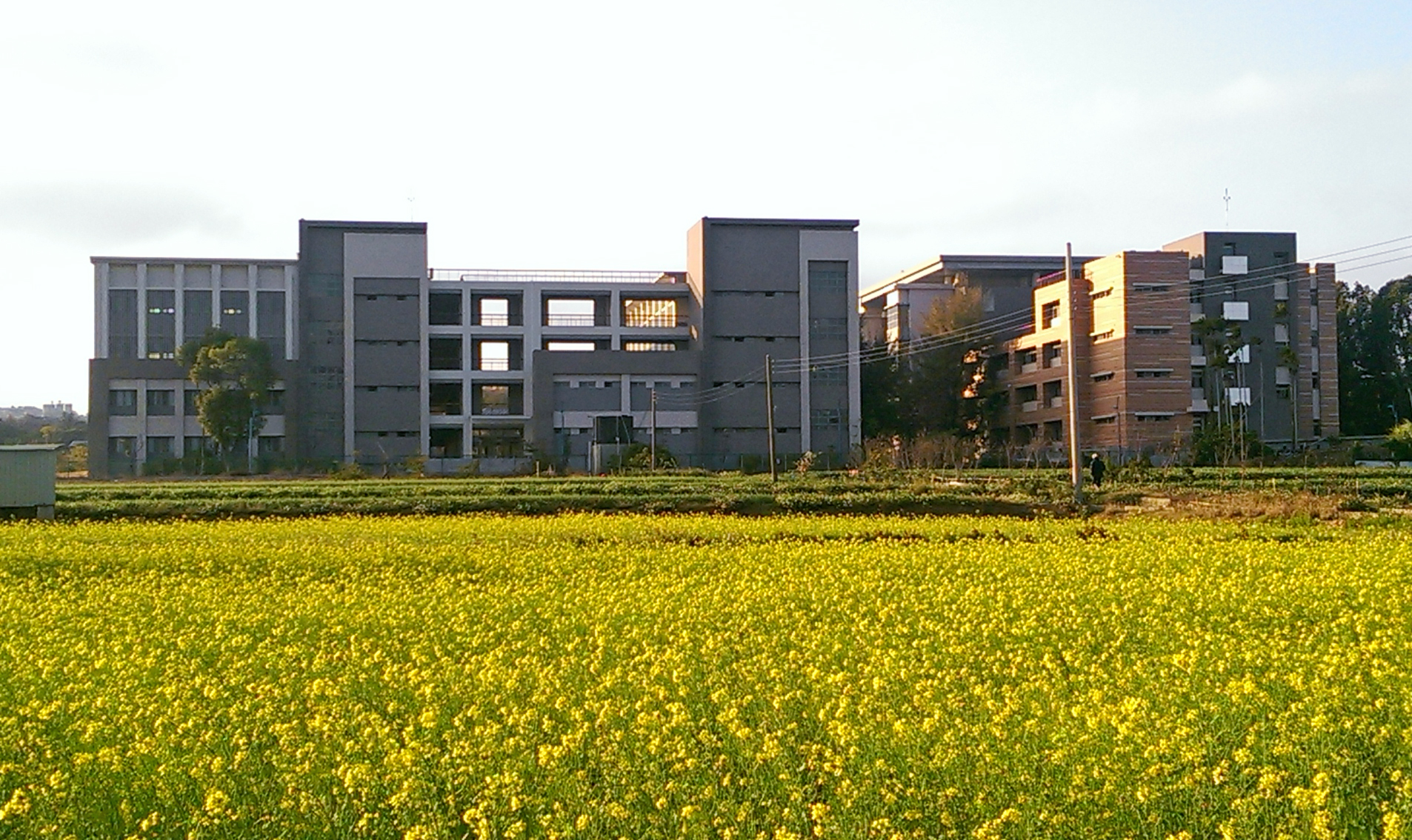

Location
- NO. 33, Pinghe S. RD., Daya District, Taichung, 428, TAIWAN (R.O.C.) 中華民國台中市大雅區秀山村平和南路33號; Taichung; Taiwan; 24.228259°N 120.628019°E

Information
- Type: Japanese international school
- Website: asp.schoolweb.ne.jp/48040001

Taichung Japanese School

Chinese name
- Traditional Chinese: 台中市日僑學校
- Simplified Chinese: 台中市日侨学校
Transcriptions
Standard Mandarin
- Hanyu Pinyin: Táizhōngshì Rìqiáo Xuéxiào

Former name: "Taichung County Japanese School"
- Traditional Chinese: 台中縣日僑學校
- Simplified Chinese: 台中县日侨学校
Transcriptions
Standard Mandarin
- Hanyu Pinyin: Táizhōngxiàn Rìqiáo Xuéxiào

Japanese name
- Kanji: 台中日本人学校
Transcriptions
- Romanization: Taijon Nihonjin Gakkō

Taichung Japanese School is a Japanese international school in Daya District, Taichung, Taiwan in the Republic of China.

Unlike the enrollments of the Japanese schools in Taipei and Kaohsiung, the enrollment of the Taichung Japanese School increased between 1990 and 2010.

== See also ==
- Japanese people in China

Republic of China-aligned Chinese international schools in Japan:

- Osaka Chinese School
- Tokyo Chinese School
- Yokohama Overseas Chinese School
