= Kaohsiung Japanese School =

School in Lingya, Kaohsiung, Taiwan

- 高雄日本人学校 高雄市日僑學校

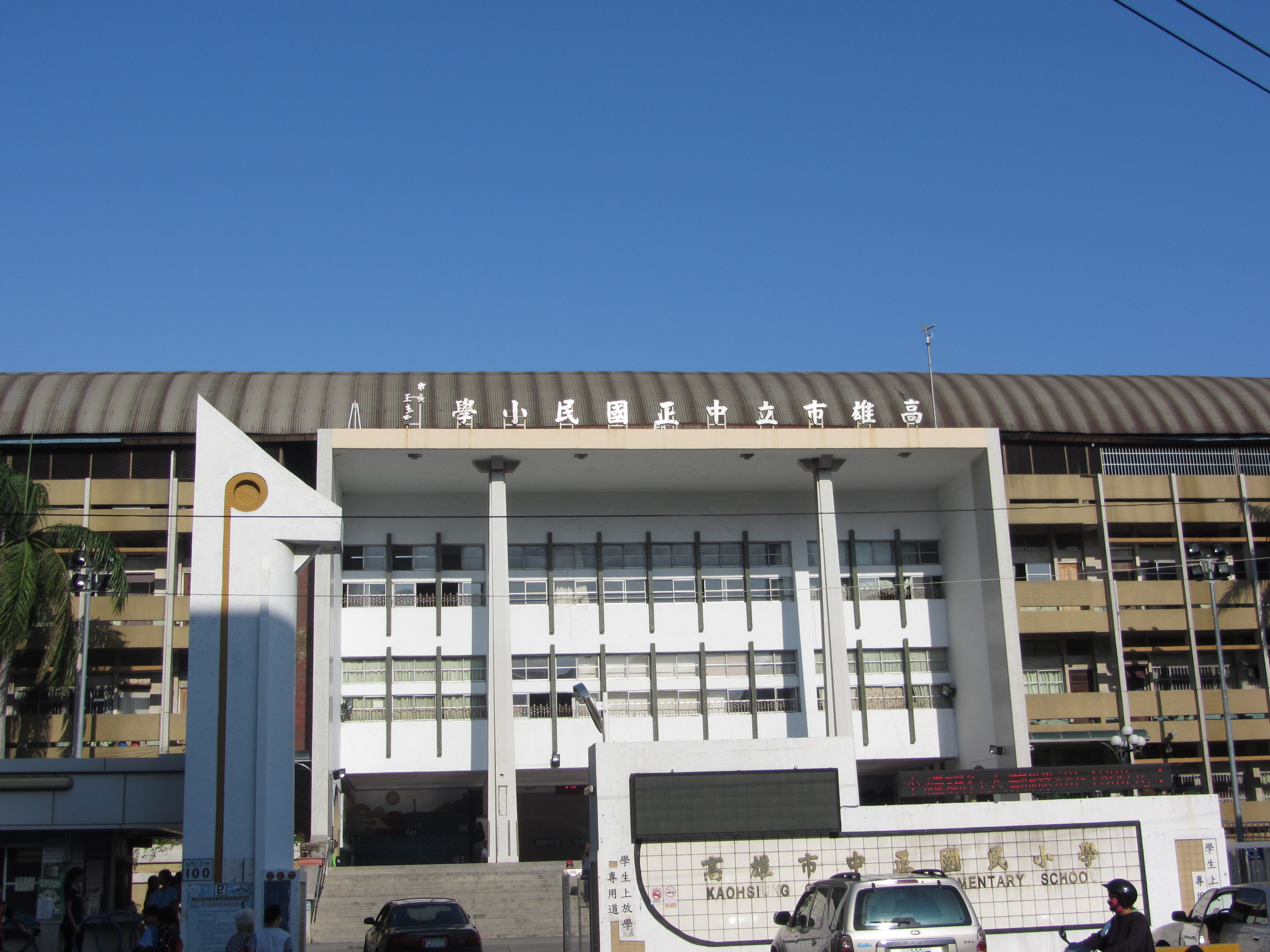
- Jhong-Jheng Elementary School (高雄市苓雅區中正國民小學), which houses the Kaohsiung Japanese School

Location
- Inside Kaohsiung Municipal Jhong-Jheng Elementary School, No. 100, Furen Rd., Lingya District, Kaohsiung City 802, Taiwan (R.O.C.) 中華民國台灣高雄市苓雅區輔仁路100號 (高雄市苓雅區中正國民小學内); Taipei; Taiwan; 22°37′47.4″N 120°20′01.9″E

Information
- Type: Japanese international school
- Website: www.kaohsiung-js.com

Kaohsiung Japanese School

Chinese name
- Traditional Chinese: 高雄市日僑學校
- Simplified Chinese: 高雄市日侨学校
Transcriptions
Standard Mandarin
- Hanyu Pinyin: Gāoxióngshì Rìqiáo Xuéxiào

Japanese name
- Kanji: 高雄日本人学校
Transcriptions
- Romanization: Kaoshun Nihonjin Gakkō

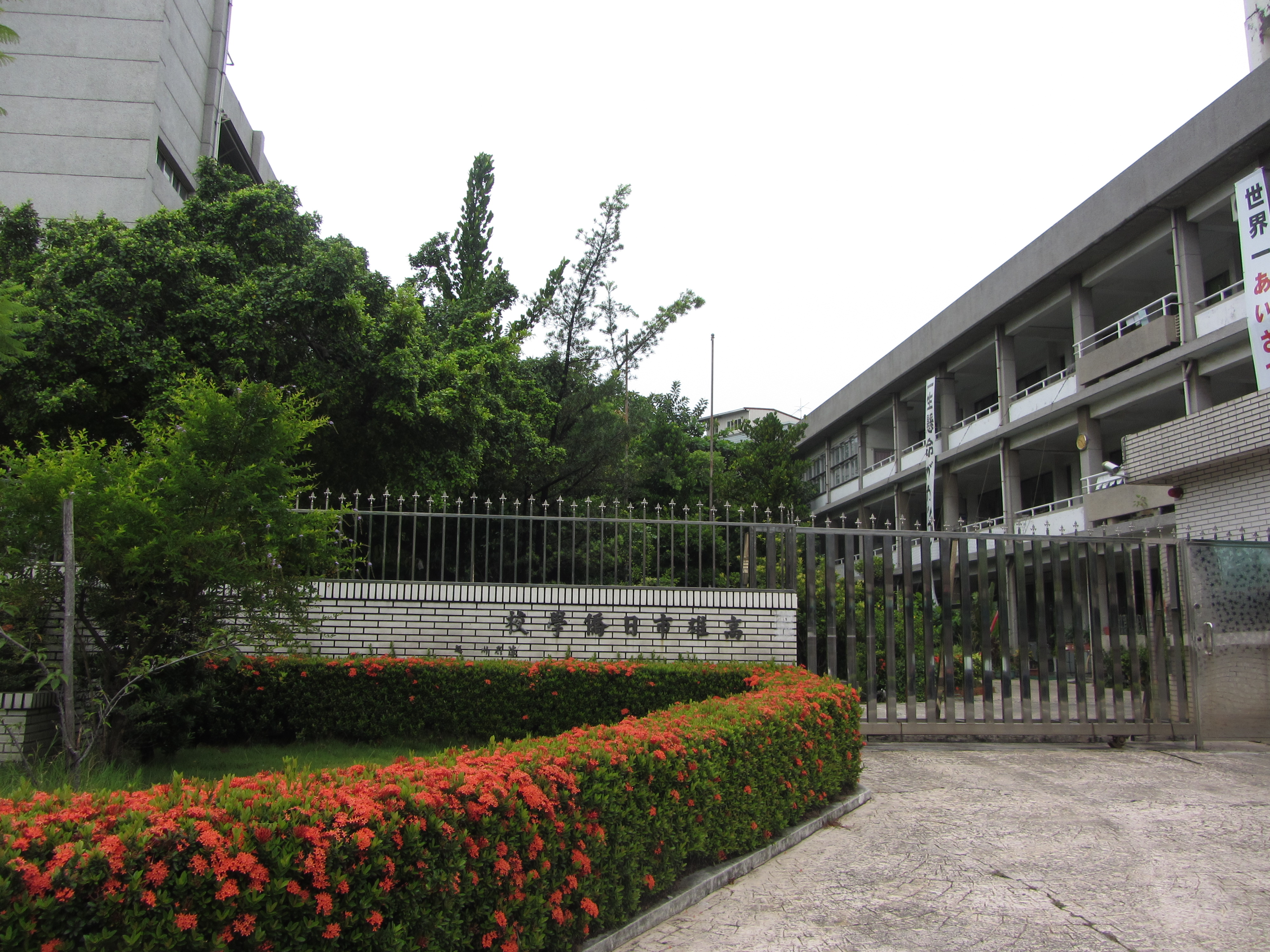
Former campus in Sanmin District

The Kaohsiung Japanese School is a Japanese international school on the campus of Kaohsiung Municipal Lingya District Jhong-Jheng Elementary School (高雄市苓雅區中正國民小學) in Lingya District, Kaohsiung, Taiwan in the Republic of China.

It was previously located in Sanmin District. The enrollment declined significantly between 1990 and 2010. The final day of class in the former Sanmin campus was on 19 July 2014.

== See also ==
- Japanese people in China

Republic of China-aligned Chinese international schools in Japan:

- Osaka Chinese School
- Tokyo Chinese School
- Yokohama Overseas Chinese School
