= Tokyo Chinese School =

Chinese language day school in Tokyo, Japan

- 東京中華學校 東京中華学校

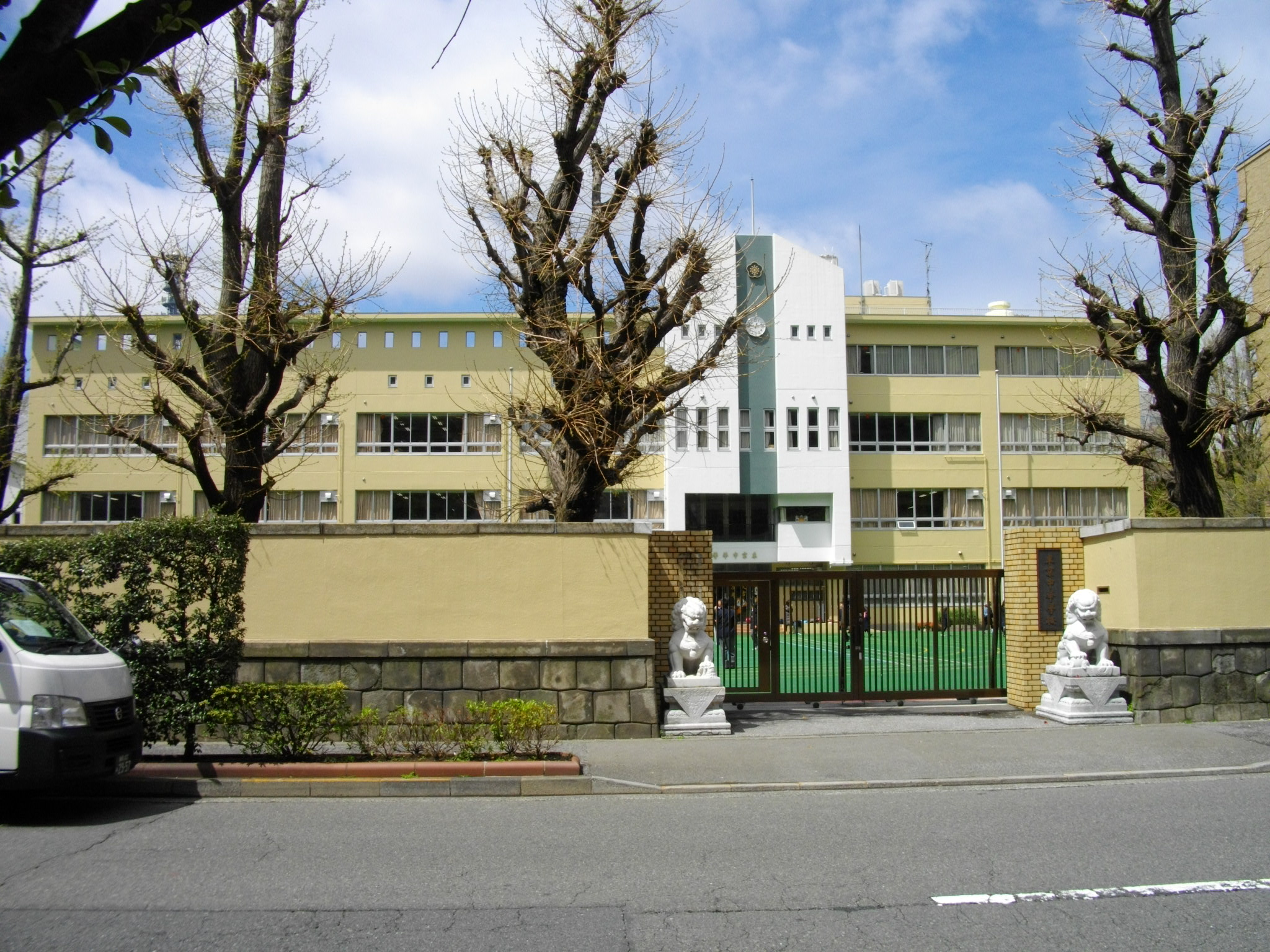

Location
- 14 Gobanchō, Chiyoda-ku, Tōkyō-to 102-0076 〒102-0076 東京都千代田区五番町14番地; 35°41′19″N 139°43′56″E

Information
- Motto: 文明礼貌
- Established: 1929
- Website: tcs.or.jp

Tokyo Chinese School

Chinese name
- Traditional Chinese: 東京中華學校
- Simplified Chinese: 东京中华学校
Transcriptions
Standard Mandarin
- Hanyu Pinyin: Dōngjīng Zhōnghuá Xuéxiào
- Wade–Giles: Tung^{1}-ching^{1} Chung^{1}-hua^{2} Hsüeh~~2~~-hsiao~~4~~

Japanese name
- Kanji: 東京中華学校
Transcriptions
- Revised Hepburn: Tōkyō Chūka Gakkō

Tokyo Chinese School (TCS) is a Chinese international school in Gobanchō (五番町), Chiyoda, Tokyo, Japan. The Ministry of Education, Culture, Sports, Science and Technology (MEXT) accredits the school.

Originally established in 1929 as an elementary school for Overseas Chinese, its operation now follows the education system of the Republic of China (Taiwan), and provides education for students ageing between 7 and 18.

== History ==
Historically the school was located in Yotsuya. Around 1984 the school built an office building that was rented to Japanese companies, generating revenue for the school.

In a 2008 The Japan Times article Liu Chien Cheng, the head of the school, said that she saw an increase in applications "over the past two or three years." She did not state specific numbers.

== Campus ==
As at 1989, the school provided audio-visual language learning, cooking, and music departments. The school underwent renovations through a loan from a Japanese bank in the year 1984. Cecilia Chang of Taiwan Today wrote in 1989 that "The newly refurbished school building has facilities far superior to most similar institutions in Taiwan."

== Curriculum ==
As of 1989 in most classes the school uses Taiwanese textbooks. In arithmetic and natural science the school does not use Taiwanese textbooks. The school has social etiquette classes. The school has Mandarin, Japanese, and English classes, and Cecilia Chang stated that the school had an emphasis on language education.

== Student body ==
As of 2003 it had 352 students. As of 2008 most students are from Taiwan or China, and about 33% of the students are from Japan. As of the same year 80% of the students who graduate from the school attend universities and colleges. Most students go to Japanese universities. Some students go to Taiwanese universities and some go to universities in other countries. As of 1989 several Taiwanese students have parents who are taking graduate courses at Japanese universities; they will return to Taiwan once the parents finish their studies.

== Teacher demographics ==
Teachers at this school have higher salaries compared to the salaries found in most Chinese schools outside of Greater China. Most teachers have Master of Arts degrees as of 1989. Some teachers have PhDs as of the same year.

== Notable alumni ==
=== Go players ===
- Cho U
- Xie Yimin
- Rin Kaiho
- Ō Rissei

=== Others ===
- Judy Ongg, singer
- Chen Kenichi, chef
- Yinling, model
- Annie Yi, singer

== See also ==
- List of high schools in Tokyo
- Chinese people in Japan

Japanese international schools in Taiwan, Republic of China:

- Taipei Japanese School
- Kaohsiung Japanese School
- Taichung Japanese School
