= Yokohama Overseas Chinese School =

International school in Japan

- 横浜中華学院 橫濱中華學院

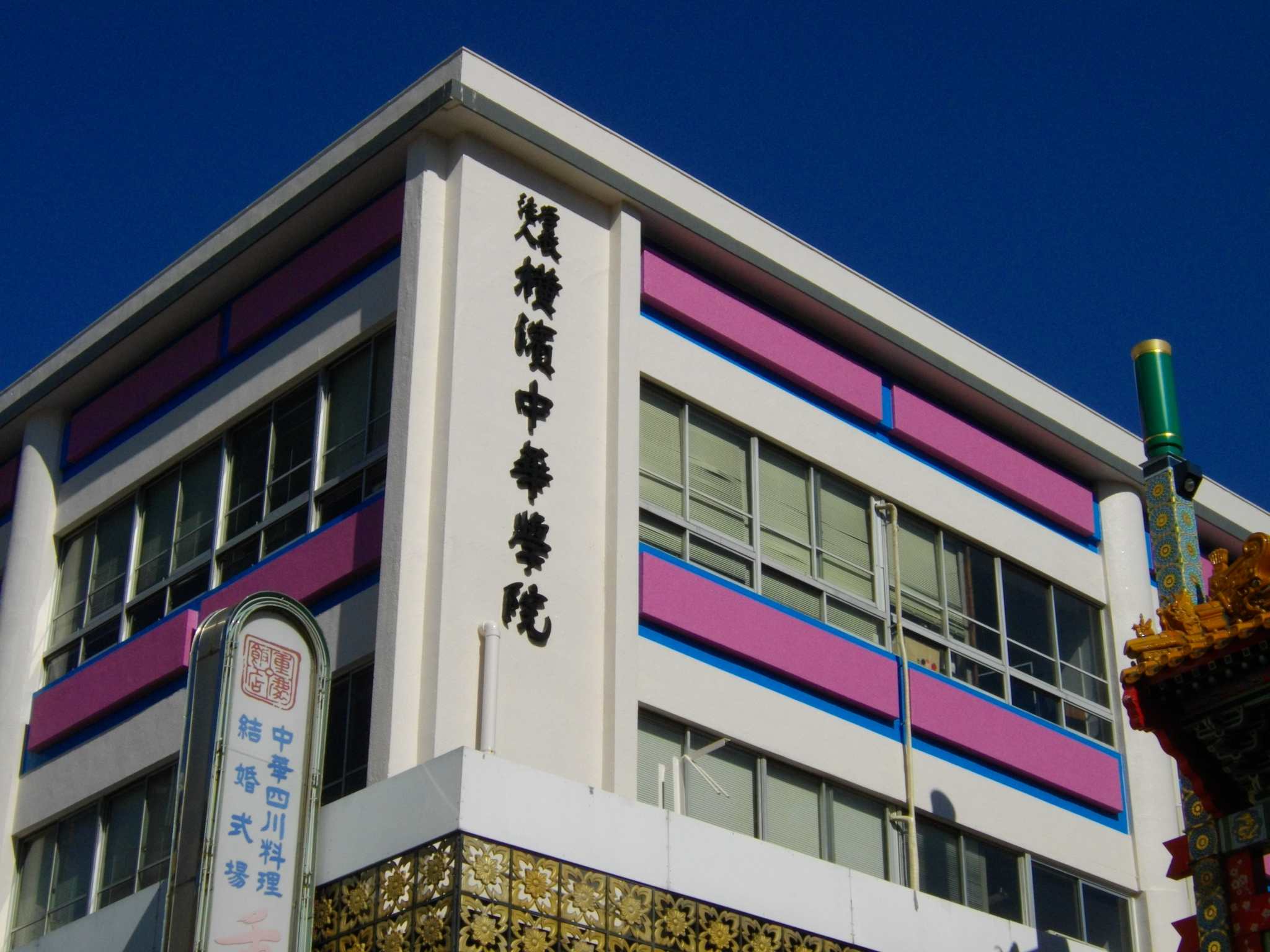

Location
- 142 Yamashitacho, Naka Ward, Yokohama, Kanagawa 〒231-0023 横浜市中区山下町142番地; 35.4422413°N 139.6445956°E

Information
- Established: 1952
- Website: www.yocs.jp/YOCS/

Yokohama Overseas Chinese School

Chinese name
- Traditional Chinese: 橫濱中華學院
- Simplified Chinese: 横滨中华学院
- Literal meaning: Yokohama Chinese/Cultural Ethnic School
Transcriptions
Standard Mandarin
- Hanyu Pinyin: Héngbīn Zhōnghuá Xuéyuán
- Wade–Giles: Heng-pin Chung-hua Hsüeh-yüen

Japanese name
- Kanji: 横浜中華学院
Transcriptions
- Revised Hepburn: Yokohama Chūka Gakuin

The Yokohama Overseas Chinese School (YOCS) is a Republic of China-oriented Chinese international school in Naka-ku, Yokohama, Japan. It serves elementary through senior high school. As of 2010 Shih Huei-chen (施惠珍 Shī Huìzhēn) is the president of the school.

== History ==
It was formed after the 1952 split of the Yokohama Chinese School, which was established by Sun Yat-sen. Yokohama Overseas was aligned with Taiwan, while the Yokohama Yamate Chinese School was aligned with the People's Republic of China.

In 2010 the school asked for assistance from Lien Fang Yu (連方瑀 Lián Fāngyǔ), the wife of Lien Chan; at that time the school had a shortage in funding. Yang Ching-huei described the buildings as "very old" and requiring "some serious renovation work." By 2011 the school established interviews and other entrance examinations due to an increase in prospective students.

== Operations ==
As of 2010 most of the school's funding originates from tuition while the Overseas-Compatriots Commission provides some assistance. As of 2010 the school charges monthly tuition rates below the Japanese private school average of ¥50,000 per student; the monthly tuition per elementary or junior high student was ¥22,000 ($268 U.S. dollars) while the per-student tuition at the high school level was ¥25,000.

== Curriculum ==
Each week first-year students have ten Chinese lessons, each lasting 45 minutes; four Japanese lessons, and one English lesson.

== Student body ==
In 1997 each class had about one or two students who were Japanese. As of 2008 about 15% of its students were Japanese nationals, including ethnic Chinese persons with Japanese citizenship. As of 2010 71% of the students were children of Taiwanese families living in Japan and/or are originating from Taiwan. Other students were ethnic Chinese from other countries and Japanese. A YOCS teacher named Chiang Pin-huei (江品輝 Jiāng Pǐnhuī) stated in the Taipei Times that the "focused" education of the YOCS resulted in the high percentage of Taiwan-origin students. By 2011, due to the increase in popularity of international schools among Japanese parents, each first-year elementary class had about 20 Japanese students, making up about 33% of each class. As of that year some new students initially enrolling in the school did not have any understanding of Chinese.

== See also ==
- Chinese people in Japan
- List of junior high schools in Kanagawa Prefecture
- List of elementary schools in Kanagawa Prefecture

Japanese international schools in Taiwan, Republic of China:

- Taipei Japanese School
- Kaohsiung Japanese School
- Taichung Japanese School
