= Miscellaneous school =

Type of school in Japan and South Korea

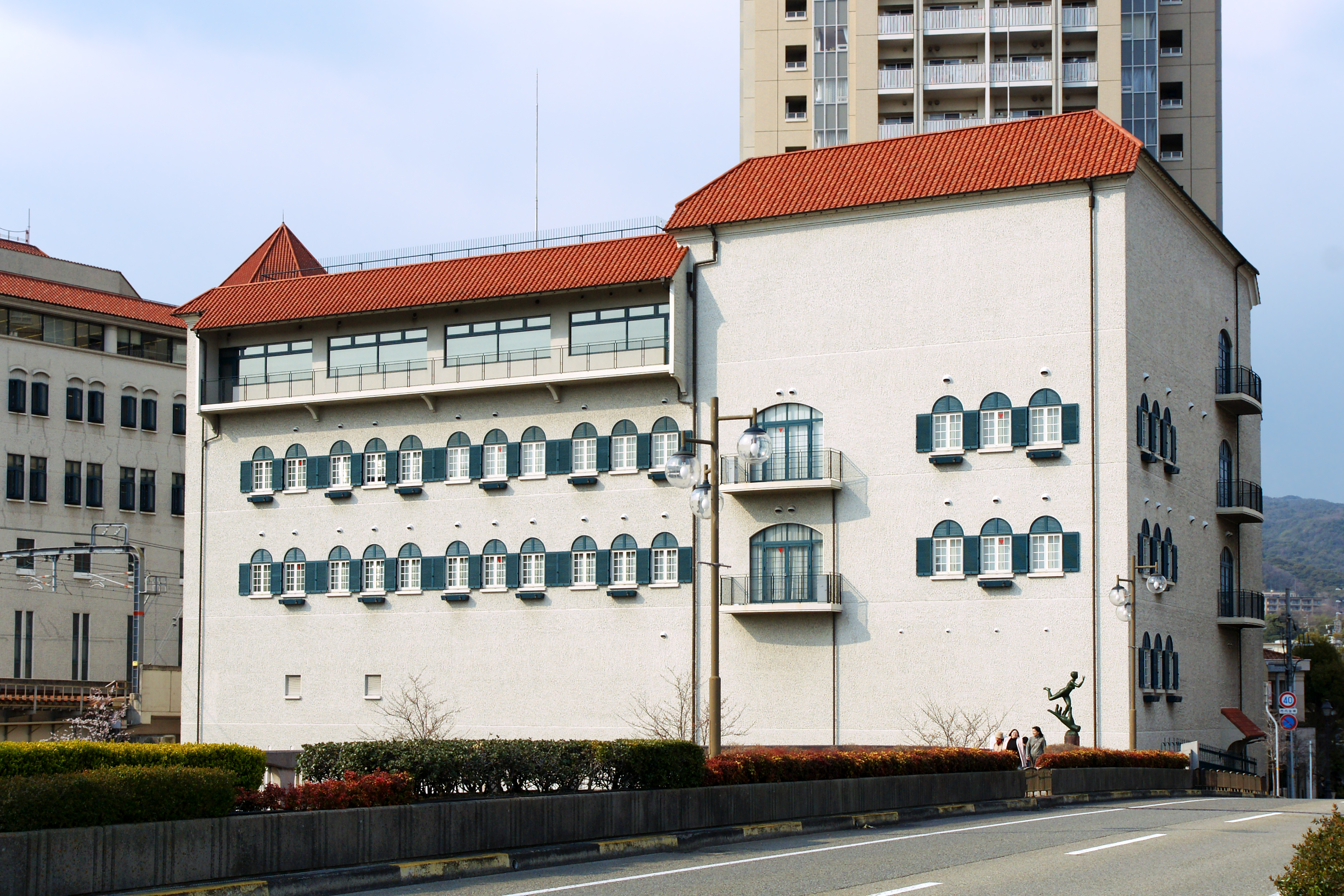
Takarazuka Music School in Takarazuka, Hyogo prefecture, Japan

A miscellaneous school is a classification of schools under the education laws of Japan and South Korea.

== Japan ==
=== Overview ===
Kakushu gakkō (Japanese: 各種学校), sometimes translated as "miscellaneous vocational school", is a classification of schools in Japan, established by Article 134 of the School Education Act. Types of schools classified as miscellaneous schools include driving schools, vocational schools, and some international schools (such as the Chōsen gakkō run by North Korea-aligned Chongryon). Due to this status they receive a smaller government subsidy than do ordinary Japanese private schools. Their graduates may also face difficulties registering to take entrance examinations for high schools and universities. For example, the Osaka Chinese School warns parents of prospective students that, while the municipal government of Osaka allows OCS graduates who are Chinese citizens and people of Chinese descent to sit for public high school examinations, the government has refused the same permission to OCS graduates who are Japanese citizens not of Chinese descent.

As of May 1, 2007, there were 120 "miscellaneous schools" that were not aimed at Japanese children; they included 79 chōsen gakkō, five Chinese schools, four schools that serve Brazilian or Peruvian students, and one school affiliated with South Korea, along with 31 other international schools.

=== Standards of recognition ===
Regulations setting out the standards for accreditation as a miscellaneous school were issued by the then-Ministry of Education in 1956. Under those regulations, the power to accredit miscellaneous schools was assigned to the prefectural governors. The accreditation standards thus differ by prefecture. For example, as of 2011, the minimum threshold for total assets as a proportion of yearly operational expense ranged from one-sixth to two-thirds, and some prefectures demand that miscellaneous schools own lands and buildings as a condition of accreditation, while others have relaxed this standard and allow schools which rent their facilities on a long-term or even short-term basis.

Some international schools have been able to convert from "miscellaneous school" to so-called "Article 1 school" (第1条校) status, making them ordinary recognised private schools under Japanese law. Chōsen gakkō have been unable to obtain this kind of official recognition as private schools, a situation which their supporters have described as discriminatory.

== South Korea ==
The classification of gakjong hakkyo (Korean: 각종학교; Hanja: 各種學校) is defined in regulations promulgated under the authority of Article 60, Paragraph 3 of the Primary and Middle Education Act, and Article 59, Paragraph 3 of the Higher Education Act. Article 12 of the regulations defines schools for foreigners following the curricula of a foreign country as one type of gakjong hakkyo.
