= Zhu Zhiyu =

Chinese scholar of Confucianism

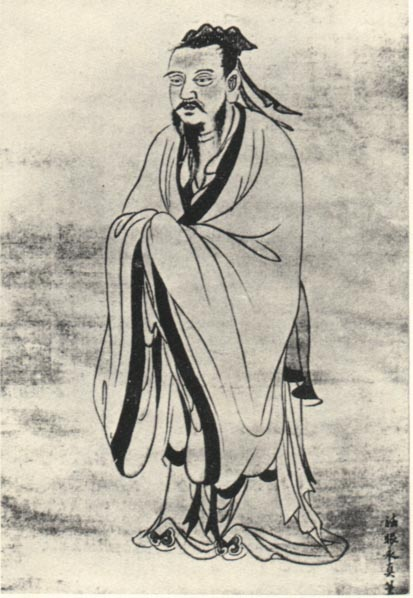

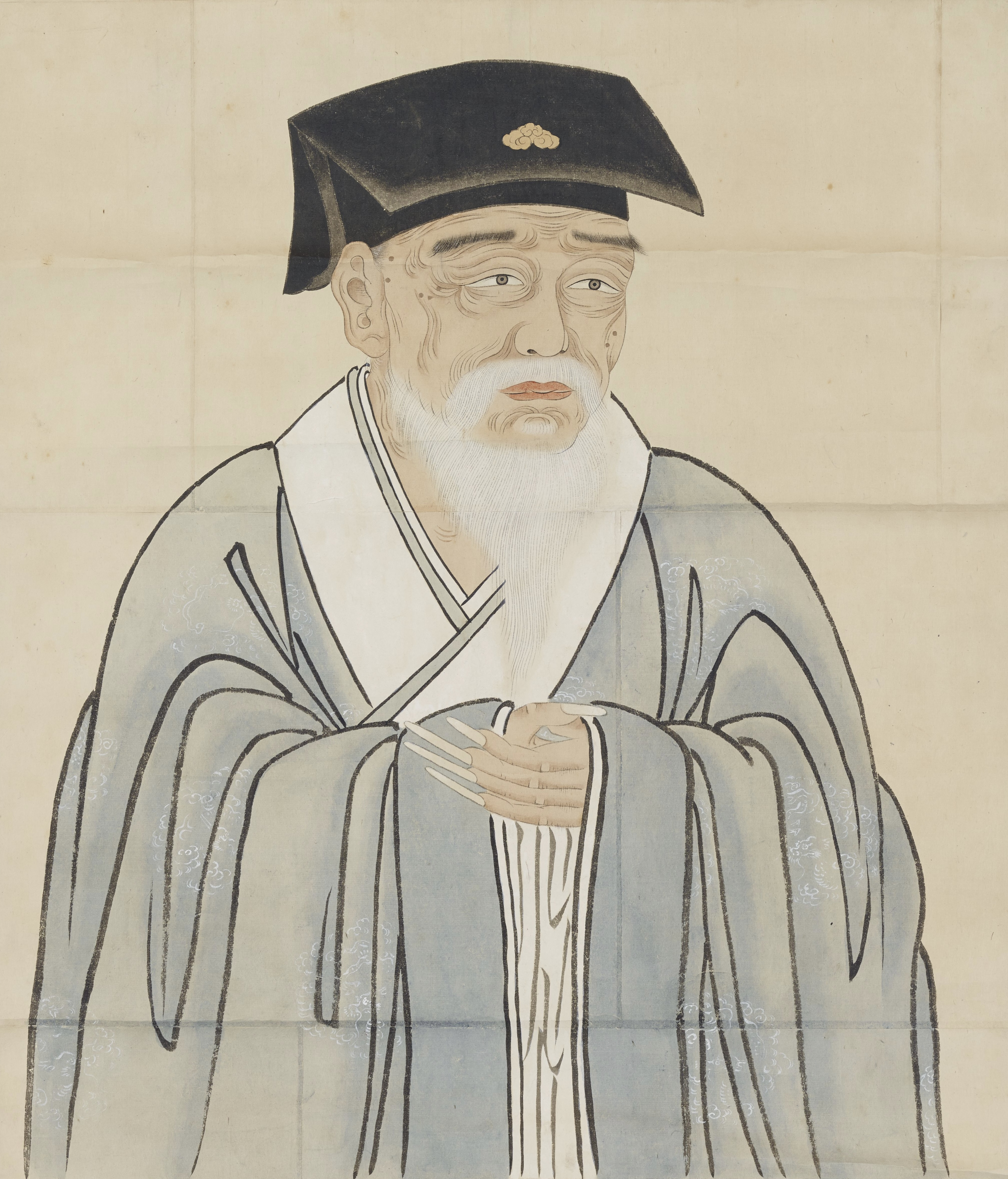
drawn in 1872

Zhu Zhiyu (Chinese: 朱之瑜; 1600–1682), courtesy name Luyu (魯璵), and commonly known as Zhu Shunshui (朱舜水; romaji: Shu Shunsui) in Japan, was one of the greatest scholars of Confucianism in the Ming dynasty and Edo Japan. Zhu remains the best remembered of the Ming political refugees in Tokugawa Japan and the one who contributed most to Japanese education and intellectual history.

== Early life ==
Born in Yuyao, Zhejiang, China, Zhu sailed to Japan for the first time in 1645 to request military and financial help for the Ming against the Manchus. The Satsuma clan offered 3,000 men, mainly criminals and money but did not follow through on their promise. The Tokugawa, after some debate, offered nothing, preferring not to get involved in potentially risky continental politics. It was less than fifty years since Japan had been forced to bring their troops home from Korea after failing to conquer Korea.

After travelling around other countries asking for help, Zhu again visited Japan in 1651. This time Zhu asked for permission to stay in Japan permanently. In his letter of application he stated:

"I hear that in your honourable country, the [Classics] of Poetry and History are honoured and [the virtues] of propriety and righteousness are valued. Thus, I have come here, without consulting my relatives.... I can no longer go back; the three men who were my teachers and friends have all died.... I therefore submit this letter ... asking Your Excellency to pass it to higher authorities... so that I may be allowed to remain for a time in Nagasaki...."

His application was refused, and he travelled instead to Annam.

== Life in Japan ==
In 1656, he attempted to sail back to China, but without success– once again ending up in Japan. This time he received letters from Andō Seian who wanted to become his disciple. Through Andō's help he got special permission to live in Nagasaki in 1659. At first, life was hard as he had little money, but in 1664, Zhu received an invitation from Tokugawa Mitsukuni, grandson of Ieyasu and daimyō of Mito to go to Edo as a senior lecturer in the Toku School.

Mitsukuni and Zhu became close friends and he remained under Mitsukuni's protection for the last seventeen years of his life, often in the daimyō's personal company. As Mitsukuni's adviser and teacher, Zhu discussed politics and philosophy, urging Mitsukuni to take special care of the old and the poor, and to be a good ruler. He came into contact with many Japanese scholars, and was also invited to deliver public lectures to large audiences. Several of his disciples later wrote the major Japanese history compilation, Dai Nihonshi (The History of Great Japan), which he also edited. He personally wrote The Collected Works of Zhu Shunshui, and directly influenced Mitogaku and helped to initiate the Confucian intellectual movement known as kogaku (古学). Other disciples were associated with the development of the Zhu Xi school in Japan. Zhu also helped to redesign the Korakuen Garden, which still exists.

== Legacy ==
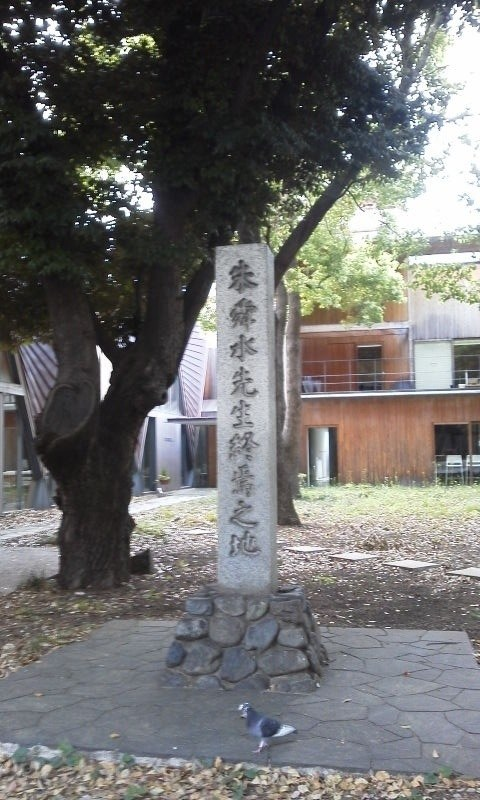
Memorial to Zhu Zhiyu at the University of Tokyo

There is a monument marking where Zhu Shunshui died inside the main gate of the College of Agriculture at the University of Tokyo, which was shifted from the road of Kototoi. His tomb, built in the Ming style, is in Hitachiōta, Ibaraki.
