= Kobe Chinese School =

Chinese international school in Japan

- 神戸中華同文学校 神戸中华同文学校

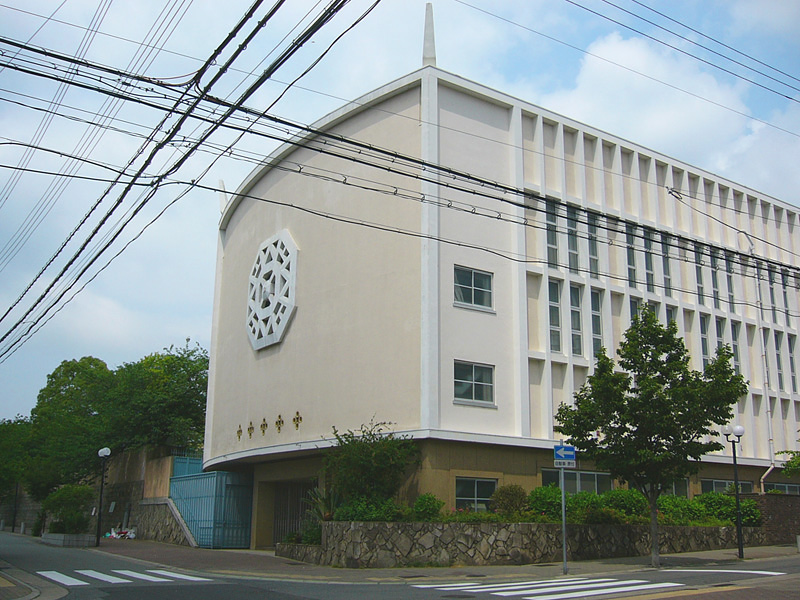

Location
- 6 Chome-9-1 Nakayamatedōri, Chūō-ku, Kōbe-shi, Hyōgo-ken 650-0004 〒650-0004 兵庫県神戸市中央区中山手通6丁目9番1号; Japan; 34.6917°N 135.1794°E

Information
- Type: Chinese international school
- Established: 1899
- Website: tongwen.ed.jp

Kobe Chinese School

Chinese name
- Simplified Chinese: 学校法人神戸中华同文学校
- Traditional Chinese: 學校法人神戸中華同文學校
Transcriptions
Standard Mandarin
- Hanyu Pinyin: Xuéxiào Fǎrén Shénhù Zhōnghuá Tóngwén Xuéxiào
- Wade–Giles: Hsüeh^{2}-hsiao^{4} Fa^{3}-jen^{2} Shen^{2}-hu^{4} Chung^{1}-hua^{2} T'ung^{2}-wen^{2} Hsüeh^{2}-hsiao^{4}

Japanese name
- Kanji: 神戸中華同文学校
Transcriptions
- Revised Hepburn: Kōbe Chūka Dōbun Gakkō

Kobe Chinese School is a Chinese international school in Chuo-ku, Kobe, Japan. It is one of two mainland China–oriented schools in Japan, the other being Yokohama Yamate Chinese School. It provides elementary and junior high school education in grades 1–9 and offers first choice in admission to children of alumni. The second choice is priority to Chinese people. The school established a policy of trying to minimize enrollment of Japanese students in 2000. In 2008 about 40% of the students were Japanese nationals who are ethnic Chinese.

== Notable people ==
- Shūhei Nomura
- Inukai Tsuyoshi, taught at the school
- Chin Shunshin, taught at the school

== See also ==
- Chinese people in Japan
- Education in Kobe
