= Yokohama Yamate Chinese School =

Chinese international school in Japan

- 横浜山手中華学校 横滨山手中华学校

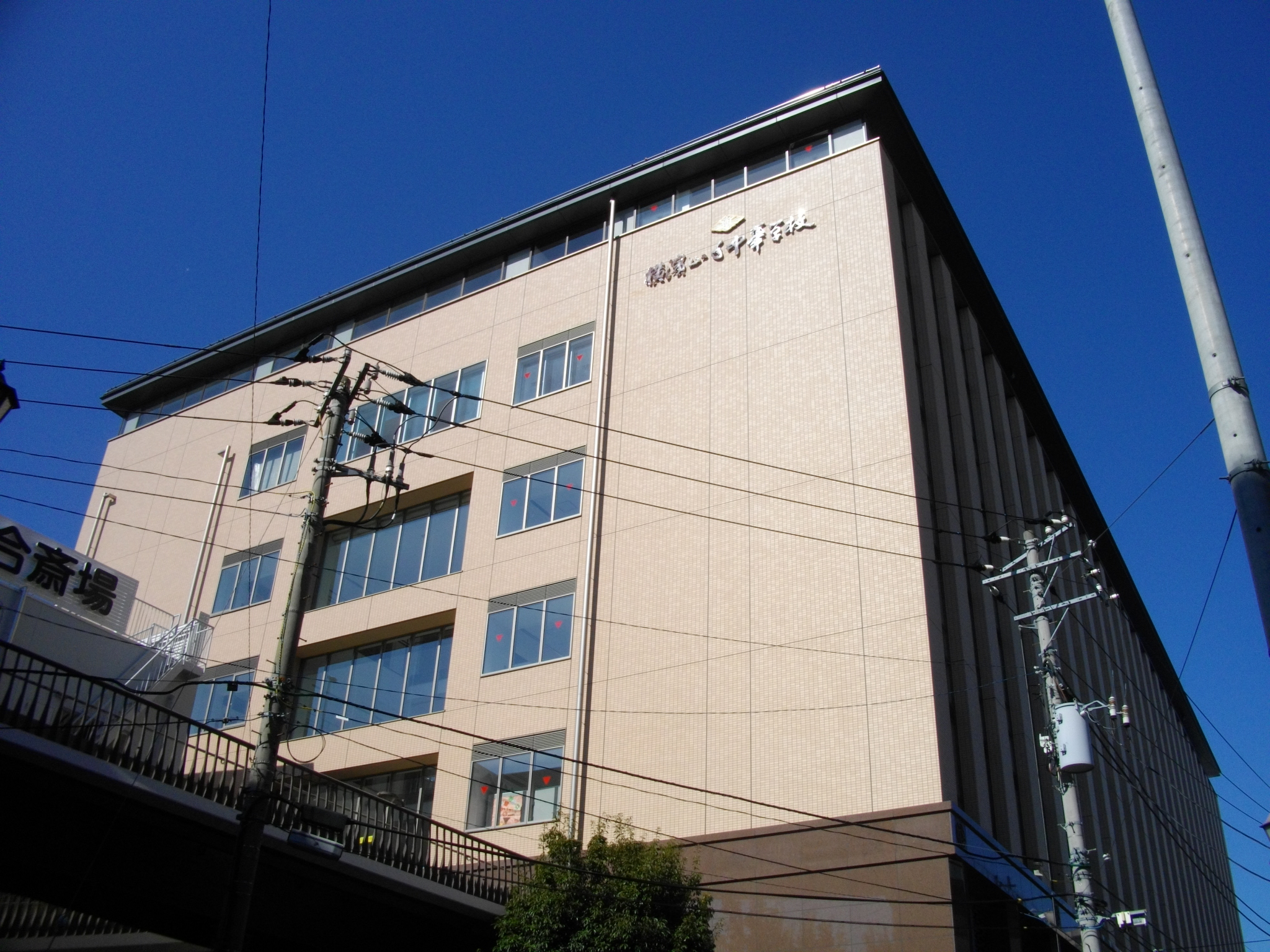

Location
- 2-66 Yoshihamacho, Naka-ku, Yokohama 〒231-0024 横滨市中区吉滨町2-66; 35.43905°N 139.64233390000004°E

Information
- Established: 1952
- Website: yycs.ed.jp

Yokohama Yamate Chinese School

Chinese name
- Simplified Chinese: 横滨山手中华学校
- Traditional Chinese: 橫濱山手中華學校
Transcriptions
Standard Mandarin
- Hanyu Pinyin: Héngbīn Shānshǒu Zhōnghuá Xuéxiào
- Wade–Giles: Heng-pin Shan-shou Chung-hua Hsüeh-hsiao

Japanese name
- Kanji: 横浜山手中華学校
Transcriptions
- Revised Hepburn: Yokohama Yamate Chūka Gakkō

The Yokohama Yamate Chinese School is a Chinese-style primary and junior high school in Naka-ku, Yokohama, Japan. Serving levels kindergarten through ninth grade, it is one of two Chinese schools in Japan oriented towards mainland China, and one of five Chinese schools total. As of 2008 Pan Minsheng is the principal.

It was formed after the 1952 split of the Yokohama Chinese School, which had been established by Sun Yat-sen. Yokohama Yamate was aligned to the People's Republic of China while the sister school Yokohama Overseas Chinese School was aligned to the Republic of China on Taiwan. In 2008 Pan stated that all of the graduating students pass entrance examinations to attend Japanese senior high schools.

== Education ==
Classes are taught in both Japanese and Chinese, with each subject being taught in one particular language. Fifth through ninth graders take English classes. Most instruction at the kindergarten level is in Japanese. The school teaches Hanyu Pinyin and Simplified Chinese.

== Student demographics ==
As of 1995 the school had 300 students, with 15% of the students being Japanese nationals who only spoke Japanese and the remainder being any of the following: Chinese-Japanese, Chinese students with mixed Japanese and Chinese parents, students with Chinese parents, and returnees from mainland China.

As of 2008 it had 413 students: 10% were ethnic Japanese; 70% of the students were Japanese citizens and 30% were Chinese citizens.

== Teacher demographics ==
As of 1995 the teaching staff consisted of four Japanese persons born in Japan, 19 Chinese persons born in Japan, and two persons born in mainland China, resulting in a total of 25.

== See also ==
- Chinese people in Japan
- Kobe Chinese School, the other PRC-oriented school in Japan
- List of junior high schools in Kanagawa Prefecture
