= Maomi Yuki =

Japanese entertainer (born 1980)

- 優木 まおみ
- Born: March 2, 1980 (age 46); Saga, Saga Prefecture, Japan
- Other name: Maomin (まおみん)
- Education: Saga Prefectural Chienkan Junior & Senior High School; Tokyo Gakugei University
- Occupation: Entertainer
- Years active: 2002–2025 (hiatus)
- Agents: Ikushima Planning Office; Harmony Promotion
- Height: 1.65 m (5 ft 5 in) (2012)
- Spouse: Unknown (m. 2013)
- Children: 2

Maomi Yuki (優木 まおみ, Yūki Maomi; born March 2, 1980, in Saga, Saga, Japan) is a Japanese entertainer represented by Ikushima Planning Office. Her business alliance is Harmony Promotion.

== Early life and education ==
Yuki was born on March 2, 1980, in Saga City, Saga Prefecture to a Japanese-Chinese father and a Japanese-Russian mother. Her parents run a Chinese restaurant in Saga.

Yuki graduated from Saga Prefectural Chienkan High School and Tokyo Gakugei University, Faculty of Education, Elementary School Teacher Training Course, majoring in Japanese Language studies.

She was an active student athlete, being a member of the basketball club for eight years, from the fourth grade of elementary school up to her third year of high school.

== Career ==
On May 24, 2025, Yuki announced that she would be taking a break from her activities and moving to Malaysia to focus more on her family.

== Personal life ==
On September 25, 1990, Yuki obtained a Class 4 amateur radio license and began broadcasting (JM6CRT).

On January 1, 2013, on New Year's Day, Yuki announced that she would be marrying a hairdresser three years her senior. The couple submitted their marriage registration on June 28 of that year. On April 4 of the following year, she gave birth to her first child, a daughter, and on January 26, 2017, she gave birth to her second daughter.

In 2019, she became a certified basi pilates instructor.

== Filmography ==
=== TV series ===
Current appearances

Year	Title	Network	Notes
2009	School Kakumei!	NTV	

Former appearances

Year	Title	Network	Notes	Ref.
2005	Music Maker	BS Asahi	Moderator	
2005	Shūkan Navi TV	NHK BS2	Moderator	
2005	Oi, Nippon	NHK BS2		
2005	Sweet Den of Premiere	Fuji TV		
2006	Doyō Studio Park	NHK G	Moderator	
2006	Shūkan! Kenkō Calendar Karada no Kimochi	TBS		
2007	Beach Angels	TBS		
2007	Quiz Presentation Variety Q-sama!!	TV Asahi		
2007	Nippon@World	Fuji TV		
2008	Eigo ga Tsutawaru! 100 Notsubo	NHK E		
2008	Nabe a Chi!	Fuji TV		
2008	Chara King	Tokyo MX	Moderator	
2009	You Knock on a Jumping Door!	Fuji TV	Guest	
2009	Cha$e	Fuji TV		
2009	Lincoln	TBS		
2009	Hikari Ota's If I Were Prime Minister... Secretary Tanaka	NTV		
2009	K-1 GrandPrix	Fuji TV	Caster	
2010	Minna no Keiba	Fuji TV	Moderator	
2010	Shin Kankaku Game Cuesta	NHK G		
2010	Gacchiri Academy	TBS		
2011	Umapuro!	Fuji TV	Saturday appearances	
2011	Kiwameru!	NHK E		
2011	1-nen 1-kumi Heisei Kyōiku Gakuin	Fuji TV		
2012	Chihara Geinō-sha	KTV	Secretary	
2013	Tsutaete Pikatchi	NHK G		
2015	Morning Bird	TV Asahi		

=== Advertisements ===
Year	Title	Notes
2002	Shirako	
2004	Zenkoku Takuchi Tatemono Torihiki-gyō Kyōkai Rengō-kai	
2004	Tōkyū Tōyoko Line	
2004	Kyōtei	
2005	Ryukakusan	
2009	Wonda	
2009	Bike O & Company	

=== Internet series ===
Year	Title	Network	Notes
2006	Shōnen Takeshi	Fuji TV	
2007	Maomi Yuki no You+Life	You+TV	
	Shūkan! Hatara King	NHK	
2009	Niconico Namahōsō	Niconico	
2009	(Yū) Nekoda Kōmuten	Bee TV	

=== Dramas ===
Year	Title	Role	Network	Notes
2002	Nari Agari	Receptionist	Fuji TV	
2009	Majo Saiban	Chiriko Ikeuchi	Fuji TV	Episode 9 to Final Episode
2011	Shimashima	Yuriko Yamamoto	TBS	Episode 1
2013	GI Dream	Horse racing reporter	BS Fuji	

=== Films ===
Year	Title	Role	Notes	Ref.
2004	Drugstore Girl	Reporter		
2004	Girly Jam - Wish			
2005	White Illumination			
2008	Blue Symphony		English narration	
