= Zheng Yongshan =

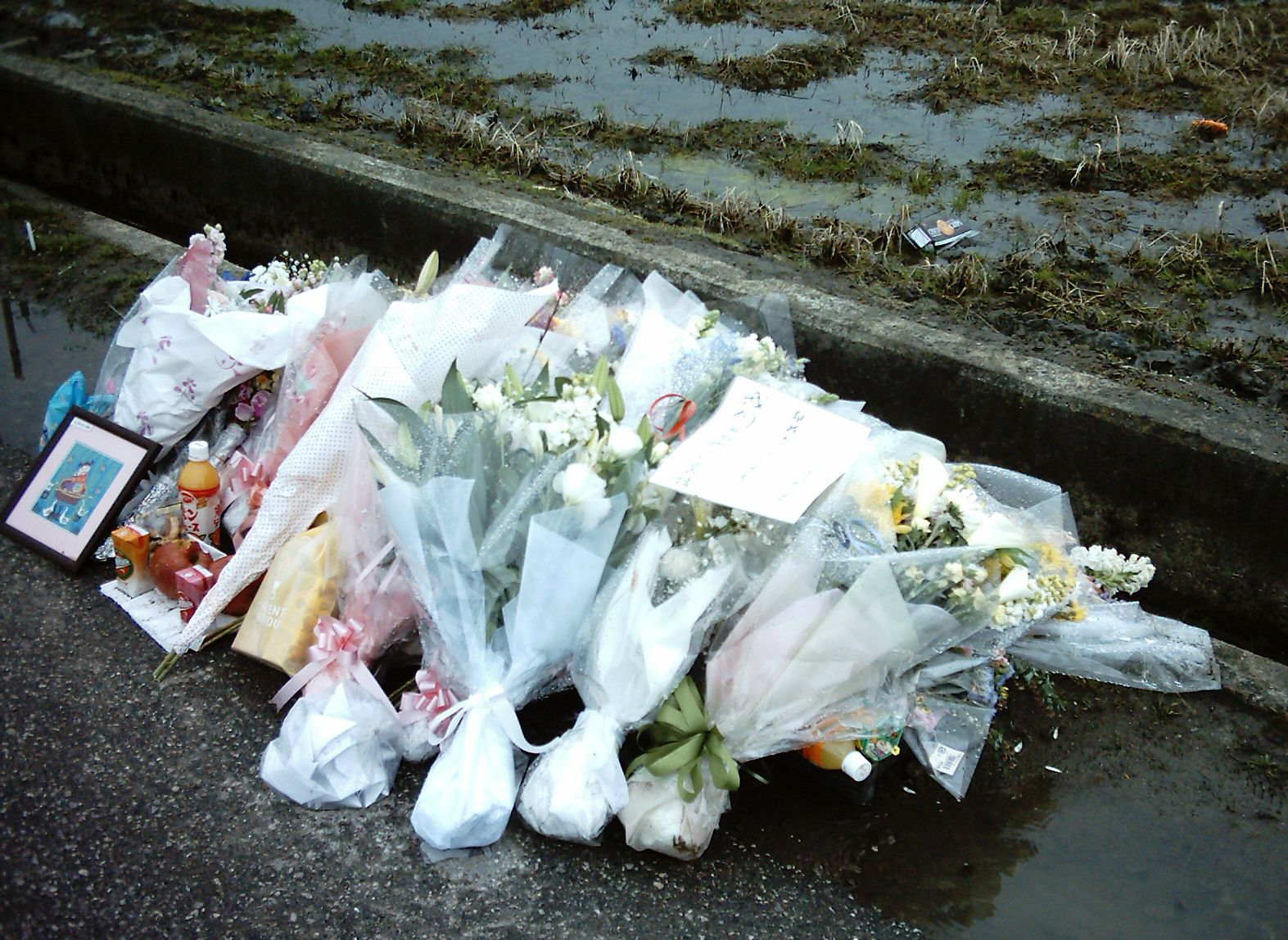
- Locality of the murders
- Born: 1972 (age 53–54)

Zheng Yongshan (鄭 永善, born 1972), who also goes by the name of Mie Taniguchi (谷口 充恵), is a mainland Chinese immigrant in Japan who was convicted of killing two children and sentenced to life imprisonment.

== Murders ==
Zheng moved to Japan in 2004 and married a Japanese man. She lived near Tokyo, Japan.

On February 17, 2006, Zheng was supposed to drive her child, and two of the child's classmates, to school as part of a carpool arrangement. She stabbed the two classmates in the stomach and back with a 20-centimeter, thin, fish-cutting blade. One child, a girl named Wakana Taketomo, was stabbed 19 times; the other, a boy named Jin Sano, was stabbed 13 times. Both children were five years old. Zheng then dumped the bodies in Nagahama, Shiga Prefecture, a small town 300 km (190 mi) southwest of Tokyo.

== Recovery of evidence and sentencing ==
A passer-by discovered the body of Taketomo on a rural road; Sano's body was recovered in an irrigation stream. After dumping the bodies, Zheng parked the car 56 km (35 mi) away from the crime scene; she still had the knife used in the killings in her possession. Taketomo was declared dead at 9:45am, shortly after she was taken to the hospital. Sano died around noon at the same hospital. Prosecutors demanded death, but Zheng was sentenced to life imprisonment without parole after she was diagnosed with schizophrenia.
