= Osaka Chinese School =

Chinese international school in Japan

- 大阪中華学校 大阪中華學校

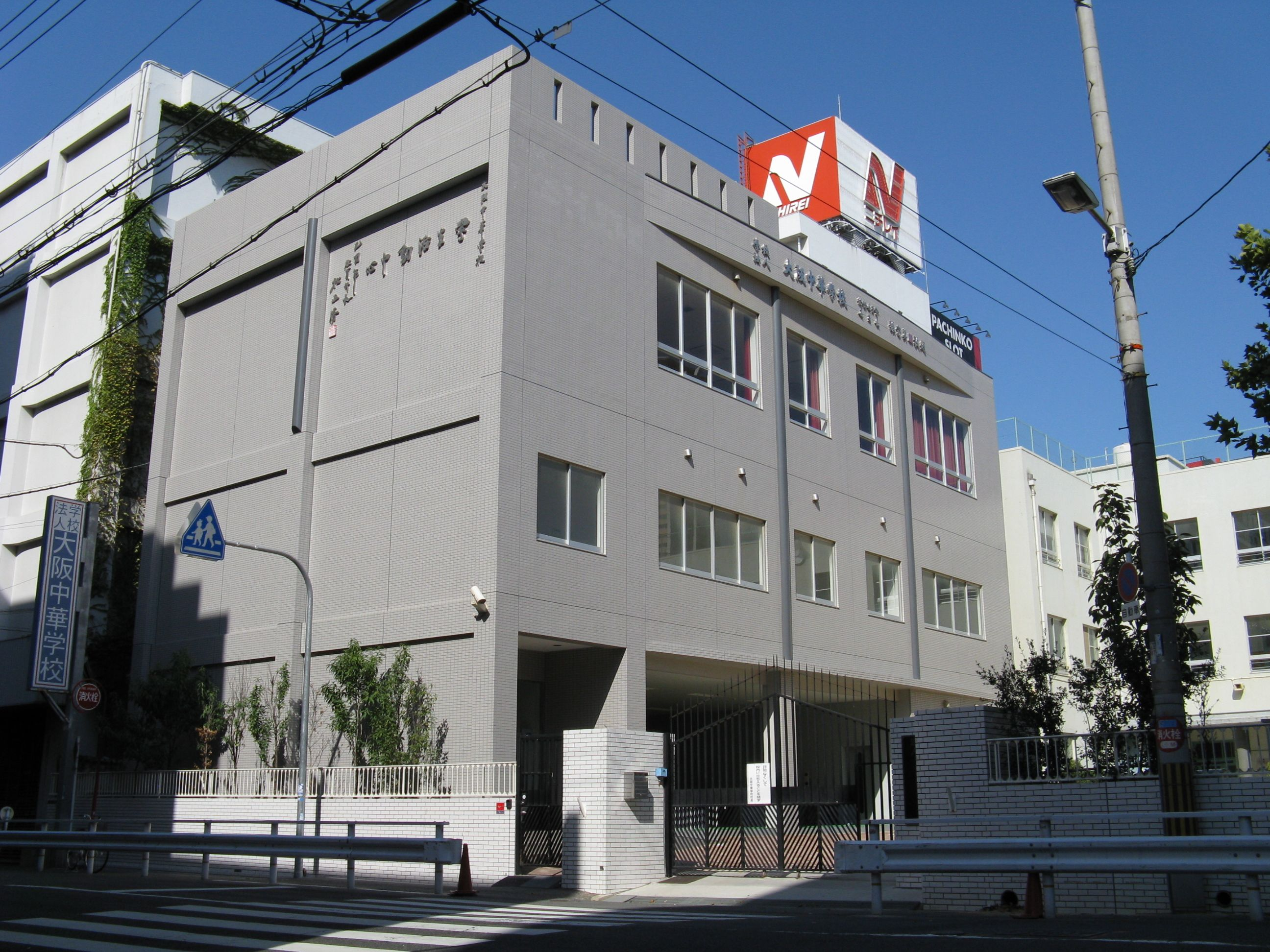

Location
- 1 Chome-8-13 Shikitsuhigashi, Naniwa-ku, Ōsaka-shi, Ōsaka-fu 556-0012 〒556-0012 大阪市浪速区敷津東1-8-13; Japan; 34.6581°N 135.4985°E

Information
- Type: Chinese international school
- Established: March 1946
- Website: ocs.ed.jp

Osaka Chinese School

Chinese name
- Traditional Chinese: 大阪中華學校
- Simplified Chinese: 大阪中华学校
Transcriptions
Standard Mandarin
- Hanyu Pinyin: Dàbǎn Zhōnghuá Xuéxiào
- Wade–Giles: Ta^{4}-pan^{3} Chung^{1}-hua^{2} Hsüeh^{2}-hsiao^{4}

Japanese name
- Kanji: 大阪中華学校
Transcriptions
- Revised Hepburn: Ōsaka Chūka Gakkō

The Osaka Chinese School is a Chinese international school in Naniwa-ku, Osaka, Japan. It serves grades 1–9.

In 1986 Chang Hwei-chin, then the school principal, stated that every year students of the Chinese school's junior high school entered Japanese senior high schools after passing entrance examinations for admission. During the 1980s the school had experienced financial difficulties and principal Chang stated that the school had a "survival problem" in 1986.

The government of Osaka Prefecture classifies the school as a "miscellaneous school". The municipal government of Osaka allows OCS graduates who are Chinese citizens and people of Chinese descent to sit for public high school examinations, but the government has refused the same permission to OCS graduates who are Japanese citizens not of Chinese descent.

== See also ==
Japanese international schools in Taiwan, Republic of China:

- Taipei Japanese School
- Kaohsiung Japanese School
- Taichung Japanese School
