= Letters to Tong Zeng =

Letters to Tong Zeng is the name given to a group of almost 10,000 letters predominantly written by civilian victims of World War II to the Chinese activist Tong Zeng in the early 1990s. Many of the writers were Chinese victims of the war as well as victims of the war in Hong Kong, South Korea, Malaysia and other places in South East Asia. The letters detail war crimes committed during the Second Sino-Japanese War, and personal testimonies of civilians during the conflicts of the war in Asia.

== Background ==
=== Historical reasons ===
After the end of World War II, on September 29, 1972, when China and Japan resumed the normalization of diplomatic relations, they signed the "Japan China joint communiqué", and the Chinese government announced that it would give up its claim for war compensation. On August 12, 1978, the two countries signed a Sino Japanese Friendship Treaty, which once again indicated that the Chinese government had abandoned Japan's claim for war compensation.

In 1990, Tong Zeng put forward a new view, that is, the Chinese government abandoned war compensation, but the victim compensation of private individuals did not give up. Individuals can directly claim compensation from Japan. Therefore, through the ages, innocent civilians in war are the most pitiful. They are displaced, and their children's childhood has become an unforgettable nightmare. The same is true of Chinese civilians in World War II. When they saw Tong Zeng's proposition, they wrote to Tong Zeng one after another. This formed the original material of Letters to Tong Zeng.

== The concept formation of Letters to Tong Zeng ==
In 2005, the two volunteers planned to gradually put the letters received by Tong Zeng from the victims of World War II on the Internet. The domain name was Tong Zeng salon. In the end, they failed. In 2012, Japanese NHK reporter interviewed Tong Zeng and found so many letters from the victims of World War II. He found a victim named Wu Jianmian as a clue and planned to make a documentary program named Letters to Tong Zeng. Finally, due to the disagreement of local authorities in China, the documentary failed. A few years later, the NHK reporter suffered from cerebrovascular disease and was unable to speak. Tong Zeng missed him very much and contacted the China Youth Daily to make a long report with the title "the unfulfilled wish of a Japanese reporter in China". In 2014, Chinese Americans David Chai, Don Tow and others established a non-profit organization in the United States to digitize the letters written by the victims of World War II to Tong Zeng online, named "10000 voices of Justice - Letters to Tong Zeng ".

== Publication ==
David Chai and Dr.Don Tow former mayors of Hender City, New Jersey, USA, called Letters to Tong Zeng a treasure trove of historical materials for victims of the Second Sino-Japanese War. China Liaoning Education Publishing House has decided to publish the book Letters to Tong Zeng (Bilingual version in Chinese and English).

== Memory of the World Register proposal ==
In 2018, members of the National Committee of the Chinese people's Political Consultative Conference proposed that the Letters to Tong Zeng be included on the Memory of the World Register for Asia and Pacific region. The committee's arguments included defences of the letters arguing for their uniqueness and authenticity.
