= Chinese government-in-exile =

The Chinese government-in-exile may refer to:

- Republic of China - governing entity of the Taiwan, Penghu, Kinmen, Matsu and other islands since 7 December 1949.
- Political status of Taiwan
- Treaty of Taipei
