= Japan–China Trade Agreement (1974) =

- Type: Bilateral Trade Agreement
- Drafted: August 16, 1973
- Signed: January 5, 1974
- Location: Beijing, China
- Expiration: January 1977
- Ratifiers: People's Republic of China; Japan
- Languages: Chinese • Japanese

The Japan–China Trade Agreement of 1974 served as a continuation of various treaties between the People's Republic of China (PRC) and Japan during the Cold War. The treaty was an important step in the normalization of relations between China and Japan, after diplomatic and economic ties had been formally re-established via the 1972 Japan–China Joint Communiqué. The talks were headed by China's Minister of External Trade and eventual Premier, Zhou Enlai (1898–1976), and Japan's Prime Minister, Tanaka Kakuei (1918–1993). The treaty was successful due to China's road to internationalism after 1972, followed by a series of diplomatic treaties, such as the Japan-China Aviation Pact (April 1974), the Maritime Agreement (November 1974), the Fisheries Agreement (August 1975), and the Trade Mark Protection Agreement (September 1977), concluding with the official Japan-China Peace and Friendship Treaty of August 1978.

== Background ==
=== 1950s ===
Sino-Japanese trade commenced from 1950 to 1958, first conducted by private business companies, which led to an escalation in trade between the two countries. However, these trade agreements were halted in 1958 due to political pressures from the United States and Taiwan. In 1955, Zhou Enlai recognized Chinese foreign policy with peaceful co-existence at the Bandung Conference, and Hatoyama Ichiro, prime minister of Japan, agreed. However, in 1958, Sino-Japanese relations were in contingency. Prime Minister Nobusuke Kishi's visit to Taiwan and other allies of the United States triggered the Chinese government's concern about Japan's expansion.

=== 1960s ===
Trade between China and Japan throughout the mid-20th century was unilaterally driven by China's 1960 Friendship Trade policy, favouring private Japanese companies opposed to anti-Chinese sentiment. In August 1960, Premier Zhou Enlai of the People's Republic of China proposed three political requirements for trade with Japan. The three proposed political principles stated that the Japanese were not to:

1. Hinder Japan–People's Republic of China diplomatic ties.
2. Contribute in the building of two Chinas.
3. Perceive the People's Republic of China as an enemy.

In 1960, Ikeda Hayato was promoted as Prime Minister of Japan; he sought to promote trade and economic cooperation with China. Sato Eisaku succeeded Prime Minister Ikeda Hayato and pledged to continue Hayato's China policy, which led to the deterioration of relations in the late 1960s. China believed Sato's government was becoming increasingly hostile, and factors outside the bilateral relationship triggered China.

Yet, after a subsequent increase in trade flows, Zhou Enlai decided to pursue further political leverage in Japan by opening the memorandum trade in 1962, setting the ground for a gradual economic and political normalization. The conclusion of the Memorandum Trade agreement between Chinese Premier Zhou Enlai and a senior Diet member of the Liberal-Democratic party (LDP) was a political breakthrough for the Chinese government as the agreement was officially accepted by the leaders of the LDP.

=== 1970s ===
In the 1970s, both governments assessed their security policies in Asia Pacific Affairs' emerging framework and entered a new peace structure. Facing the adversary political situation in 1970, Zhou proposed four political conditions for Sino-Japanese trade that would prohibit Japanese companies if it:

- Supported Taiwan's invasion of mainland China or helped South Korea invade North Korea.
- Invested a large amount of capital in Taiwan or South Korea.
- Provided weapons to the United States to support its imperial expansionism in Vietnam, Laos, and Cambodia.
- Was one of the US-Japan joint firms or US subsidiaries in Japan.

With these four conditions accepted by the Japanese government in 1971, the political situation surrounding Japan-China trade had largely evolved.

Three historical events in the 1970s supported the establishment of official bilateral Sino-Japanese relations. First, the resignation of pro-Taiwan Prime Minister Sato Eisaku and the appointment of pro-PRC Prime Minister Tanaka Kakuei in July 1972 allowed further top-down political development. Second, the end of the destructive Chinese Cultural Revolution that had been holding the central Chinese policymakers from the foreign issues. Third, the Sino-US détente in the early 1970s put the Japanese government in a vulnerable position. In 1972, with approval from the US, China and Japan signed a joint communiqué, normalizing the Sino-Japanese diplomatic relationship.

By acknowledging Beijing's one-China claim and normalizing Sino-Japanese diplomacy, the three political requirements demanded by the Chinese government were satisfied. The "friendship trade" and the memorandum trade flourished in the 60s ended after the normalization process. The normalization process also allowed the establishment of the Japan-China Economic Association in November 1972, further strengthening the economic partnerships between Japan and China.

== Negotiations ==
In addition to building diplomatic relations, the Sino-Japan normalization process manifested through economic means, with separate agreements in shipping, air transportation, and fisheries, reaching a $1.1 billion trade increase in 1972 and eventually, $3.3 billion by 1974. This significant climb in trade set the stage for Chi Yeh-Shao for his arrival in Japan on August 16, 1973, to begin talks on a formal, comprehensive bilateral trade agreement.

Signatories

- Ministry of Foreign Affairs Masayoshi Ohira
- Ministry of Foreign Affairs of the People's Republic of China, Ji Pengfei

Fundamental principles

Over several months, the governments came together to discuss the basic principles that would be integrated into their first formal bilateral trade agreement. Eventually, the two countries agreed on the following rules:

1. Most-favoured-nation status concerning customs, customs facilities, handling of merchandise for export and import, inland customs, and so forth.
2. The goods the countries are mutually interested in trading and the import and export quantity for each item.
3. Yen or yuan or other currency of payment having convertibility.
4. International market prices as the basis of trade.
5. An annual committee meeting to be held between the Japanese government and the government of the People's Republic.
6. A term of three years, renewable every year thereafter.

=== Technological exchange ===
Article 6 specifies that Japan and China should engage in and promote technological exchange. Such exchange should be administered under "the principle of equality and reciprocity." Article 6 aligns with Deng Xiaoping's, China's leader, prior visits to Japan. Deng Xiaoping visited many Japanese factories with the goal of replicating them in China to assist China's modernization. He also visited the Nissan auto plant at Zama, Kanagawa, used the high-speed railways, and negotiated with Panasonic to "help China develop low-cost consumer electronics to supply to Chinese consumers," all done to observe and predict how Japanese advanced technology would work in China.

=== Currency ===
Article 4 ensures that all payments between two signatory countries should be completed in the Japanese yen, Chinese yuan, or any exchangeable currencies by Japan and China, following the domestic laws and regulations regarding foreign currency exchange. Both signatory countries should also facilitate the related banks to make effective settlements in compliance with the domestic laws and regulations when the aforementioned currencies are used in transactions.

=== Trade: The Most-Favoured-Nation Clause ===
Article 1 ensures that the signatory countries should provide the same terms if it offers the most-favoured-nation clause to the third-party country. However, the term can be exempted from the equally most-favoured-nation clause if the benefits are provided to the neighbouring countries to facilitate border trade. Article 2 specifies that the signatory countries should exempt tariffs and taxation for the temporarily imported goods if it falls into one of the six categories:

1. Sample products
2. Goods for experiment
3. Exhibitory goods
4. Tools used for assembly purposes
5. Modified or repaired goods or materials necessary for modifications and re-pairment
6. Containers

Article 3 guarantees that the most-favoured-nation clause should also be applied to the transportation of the goods and be exempt from any custom or taxation when the goods travel across the signatory countries to be delivered to the third party country. Article 4 specifies that any payments or monetary and capital transfers between Japan and China should not be anything less than the terms of transfer between the co-signatory country and third-party countries.

Dispute Settlement Mechanisms: Joint Committee

Article 9 specifies the plan to establish a Joint Committee to implement the 1974 agreement and further trade dispute settlement (trade agreement). The Joint Committee is also responsible for recommendations on trade policies to both China and Japan. Meeting frequency and location are specified in article 9.

== Legacy ==
The aftermath of the Japanese-China 1974 Trade Agreement has resulted in the foundation of the future Negotiations for a Sino-Japanese peace and friendship. Layout for the long term cooperation between Japan and China. A three-year trade agreement was signed in January 1974. It was the first of six working agreements that covered civil aviation, shipping, fisheries, and trademarks. Also, plans for technical collaboration, cultural interaction, and consular issues were made. The treaty provided the re-establishment of trade and economic ties previously neglected, as well as became possible due to the work of diplomats who contributed to such outcome is also important, showing progressive international cooperation.

The more specific details of this trade agreement: approved the Nippon Steel contracts and exportation of large strip mills; followed the Japan-China shipping agreement; and, the Bank of China and Bank of Tokyo signed yen-yuan economic negotiations. Overall, the aspects of the Trade Agreement provided for the future financial cooperation between the two countries. The crucial aspect of the restoration of diplomatic ties was another outcome of the treaty. Through the 1974 Trade Agreement laid out the foundation for what later became known as the ten years of reconnection between China and Japan, this Trade Agreement later followed the more famously known 1978 China-Japan Treaty of Peace and Friendship.

As the two nations' diplomatic ties were restored, they reached a number of government agreements covering our bilateral links in trade, aviation, maritime transport, fisheries, culture, and science and technology.

Finally, the outcome of the 1974 Trade Agreement, allowing for the 1978 treaty of peace and friendship between the People's Republic of China and Japan, was signed in Beijing by the foreign ministers of the two nations in August 1978, following the start of discussions between the two nations in 1975. Under the Treaty, the two parties stated that they will not pursue hegemony in the Asia-Pacific area or in any other regions, and they will oppose any efforts by other nations or groups of nations to do so. The 1972 Joint Declaration between the Chinese and Japanese Governments and the normalisation of Sino-Japanese diplomatic ties are both continued and developed by the China-Japan Treaty of Peace and Friendship. It has strengthened the foundation of the friendly, "good-neighbour" relations between the two nations and opened up more opportunities for increased interactions in the domains of politics, economy, culture, science, and technology. The trade also allowed for the favourable effect on preserving stability and security in the Asia-Pacific area, demonstrating the stability of the post-war period. In conclusion, the establishment of diplomatic relations between Japan and the PRC in September 1972 provided the political basis for the expansion of commercial relations.

== See also ==
- China–Japan relations
- Treaty of Peace and Friendship between Japan and China
