= Deeming =

Deeming is a surname. Notable people with the surname include:

- Frederick Bailey Deeming (1853–1892), Australian serial killer
- Moira Deeming, Australian politician

== See also ==
- Deem (law), legal term
