= Tong Zeng =

Chinese peace activist (1956–2025)

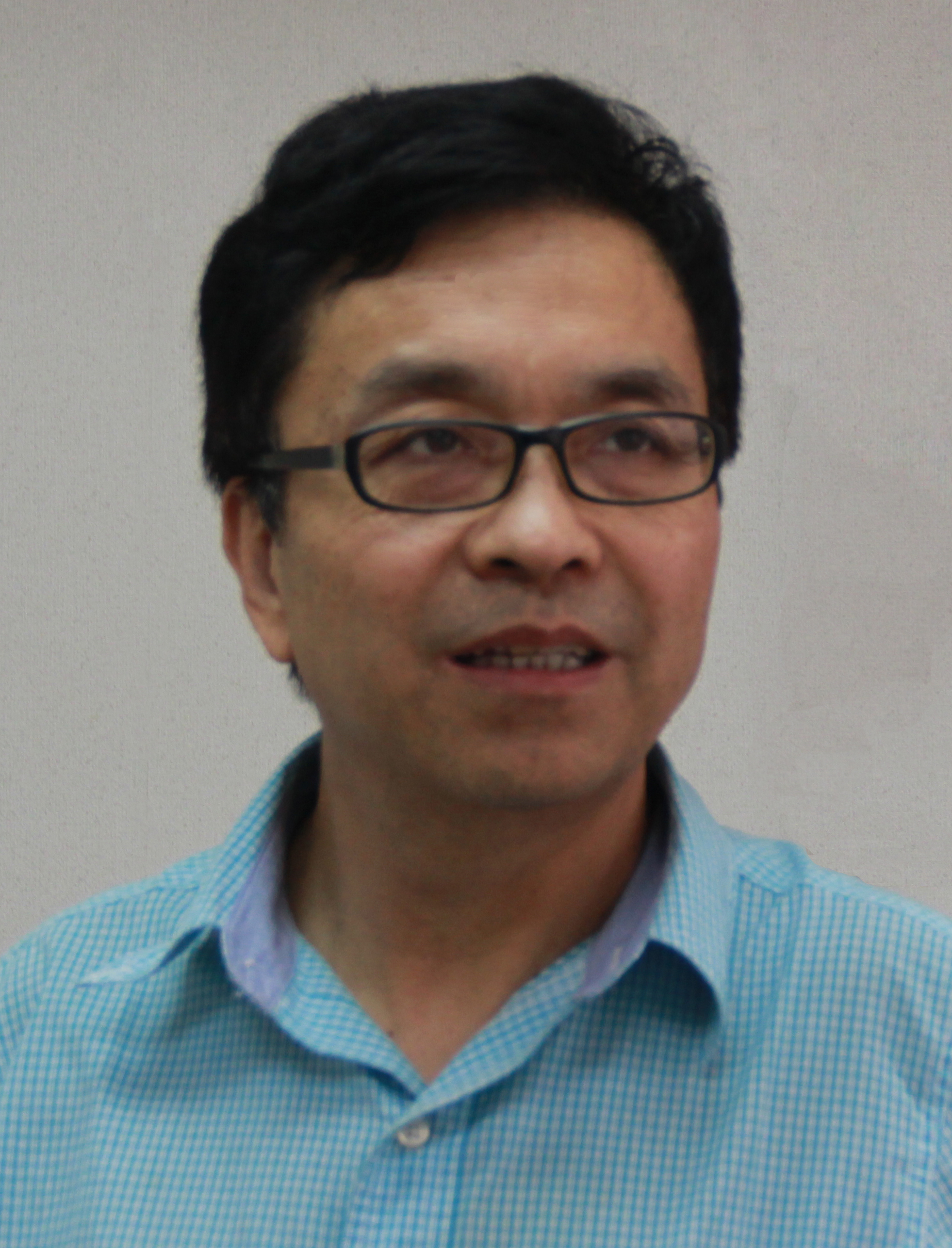
Tong in 2014

Tong Zeng (Chinese: 童增; June 3, 1956 – October 23, 2025) was a Chinese scholar, peace activist and businessman. He was chairman of the China Federation of Demanding Compensation from Japan, and chairman of Zhongxiang Investment Co., Ltd.

Tong Zeng wrote a paper in 1990, later known as Tong Zeng's "Book of Ten Thousand Words", which triggered a civil movement to safeguard the dignity and rights of victims of Japanese atrocities during World War II. Early on, Tong Zeng was restricted by the Chinese government. Reports by Human Rights Watch in 1994 and 1996, Amnesty International in 1995, and the US State Department in 1995 and 1996 mentioned that Tong Zeng was unfairly treated. He was a Nobel Peace Prize candidate in 2015 and 2017. He spoke for the voiceless and sought justice and peace in an uncertain world.

Tong was also the first to question the "Human Genome Project". In 1998, he publicly opposed the collection of blood samples of the elderly in China, and by some institutions in both China and the United States, for the so-called purpose of studying the model and analysis of the mortality of the elderly. Science magazine also participated in the interview report. In 2003, he published the book The Last Line of Defense, in which he proposed that "SARS might be produced in a laboratory or a genetic weapon aimed at the Chinese". In the preface of the book, Tong wrote: "Though the cause of the SARS virus has not been found, this book gives people a new thinking," the AP, Frankfurter Allgemeine Zeitung, China Youth Daily, and other media reported.

On July 6, 2019, Tong wrote to suggest that the United Nations should learn from the historical lessons of Albert Einstein and other scientists who failed to prevent the proliferation of nuclear weapons after the war, and must prevent the militarization and weapons of biological genetic research in some countries. At the end of 2019, when the COVID-19 pandemic broke out, he raised his concern to the Chinese government that the virus may have originated from laboratories, and sent a letter to the Secretary-General of the United Nations and the World Health Organization, asking them to conduct thorough inspections of all biological, viral, and genetic laboratories around the world.

== Early life ==
Tong Zeng's father, Tong Qiangmeng, graduated from the mechanical department of Chongqing University in 1956. His mother, Mu Huifang, graduated from accounting at a technical secondary school. Tong was born in Chongqing, China, on June 3, 1956. Chen Zongshun (pseudonym: Liu Bai), a Chinese biographer, has published four books about Tong Zeng over the past 20 years, three of which record Tong Zeng's early life. The titles of three books have also been included in bibliographies such as the National Library of Australia, the Stanford University Library of the United States, and the National Diet Library of Japan. In particular, the book Tong Zeng: the hero of our times, published in Hong Kong in 2015, is still on the sales list of the publishing house. Chinese freelance writer Guan Mingqiang wrote a long documentary report on Tong Zeng in 1998, which also detailed his early life. In these works, Tong Zeng's early life is written in detail. Tong 's childhood was greatly influenced by his grandfather. In 2016, another modern Chinese writer, Guan Jie, published another biography of Tong Zeng in China. The book also described Tong Zeng's early life in detail, and described Tong Zeng as having been born with a pair of black and bright eyes.

After graduating from high school, 19-year-old Tong Zeng went to the countryside to work in agriculture and opened up wasteland to grow tea, like many of his peers in China at the time, but he did not forget to read and study.

At the age of 20, Tong Zeng taught temporarily in local rural elementary schools and middle schools, teaching Chinese, history, geography, and other courses. At the age of 22, he was admitted to Sichuan University in China, and studied economics there. In 1982, he was assigned to teach at the Beijing Industry Management Institute. In 1985, he signed up for the international law professional examination for overseas graduate students funded by a Hong Kong foundation, but was not admitted. In 1986, he was admitted to Peking University for a master's degree in law.

Since 1987, Tong Zeng has published several articles in various Chinese newspapers. He once proposed "the theory of the new period", and put forward four major civilizations: "spiritual civilization", "material civilization", "environmental civilization", and "institutional civilization". Among them, he mentioned environmental protection to civilization construction for the first time. During his postgraduate study at Peking University, "the theory of the new period" put forward by Tong Zeng was funded by the foundation established by George Soros in China at that time. Then Tong Zeng was once again funded by the foundation and established the student social group Peking University Taiwan Research Association. Tong Zeng wrote "Where is the World Going" with his peers in 1989, in which he specifically discussed the development trends of poverty and hunger, military competitions, population crisis, lack of resources, and environmental degradation.

== Activism ==
=== The origin of Chinese folk claims against Japan ===
After the end of World War II, Germany was divided into two until 1990, when East and West Germany achieved unification. East and West Germany successfully signed the "Treaty on the Final Settlement with Respect to Germany" with the four victorious nations of Great Britain, France, the United States, and the Soviet Union. The treaty ensured the unity and sovereignty of Germany, but there was no war compensation mentioned in this document. On April 17, 1990, China's "Newspaper Digest" published a 300-word translated essay, "Europe revisited war reparations". It attracted the attention of Tong Zeng, who was 34 years old. He wrote an essay--"The Enlightenment of Europe Revisiting War Reparations for China", which was later revised to "China Demands Japan's Compensation for War Victims without Delay", which was sent to China's National People's Congress in March 1991. Media from Hong Kong and Japan reported on it. Twenty years later, Cambridge University Press published: A Case Analysis of the Chinese War Reparations Movement. In 1991, Tong Zeng, a legal scholar, submitted a "Book of Ten Thousand Words" to some representatives to the National People's Congress, petitioning to ask reparations from Japan. In particular, Timothy Webster, a professor of international law and comparative law in the United States, in the Case Western Reserve Journal of International Law, introduced in detail the views put forward by Tong Zeng in that year and the early actions to claim compensation from Japan. For the first time, Tong distinguished "war compensation" from "civil compensation", and he was the first person to propose that "Chinese civilian victims have the right to claim compensation from the Japanese government and enterprises", raising the issue of protecting the human rights of war victims to a theoretical level. It laid the legal foundation for the Chinese people to demand compensation from Japan. At the same time, a large number of volunteers gathered around Tong to start the movement of demanding compensation from Japan. At the end of 1992, according to the AP, the Chicago Tribune, and other reports, Tong had been supported by 300,000 signatures.

=== The awakening of the victims of World War II ===
On August 7, 1991, Tong Zeng and 108 Chinese citizens submitted letters to Japanese Prime Minister Toshiki Kaifu, who was visiting China, demanding that Japan apologize and compensate the Chinese for the losses caused by the invasion of China in World War II. For the first time in the post war period, the Chinese people asked the Japanese government to apologize and compensate for the war crimes of World War II. On January 8, 1992, South Korean comfort women demonstrated for the first time at the entrance of the Japanese Embassy in South Korea and filed a claim for compensation. UPI also reported that Tong Zeng led 600 senior Chinese intellectuals to petition relevant Chinese departments, saying that the Chinese government had abandoned Japan's war compensation, but the individual Chinese victims did not give up their rights. Subsequently, more and more people have demanded Japanese war compensation, and Tong is widely regarded as the leader of the war reparations movement.

Tong initiated and promoted a non-governmental compensation campaign against Japan after being disseminated by the media.

From 1991 to 1995, he received nearly 10,000 letters from victims of World War II from all over China. Those who wrote to seek Tong Zeng's help included survivors of the Nanjing Massacre, "Comfort women" in China and South Korea, family members of the victims of human tests conducted by Japanese Unit 731, Chinese people injured in Japanese germ warfare, victims of forced labour, and victims of "indiscriminate bombing". There are also letters signed by victims' organizations in support of Tong Zeng, and so on.

A reporter of China South Reviews magazine described this phenomenon as: "if the psychological activities of a society in a certain period can be counted, then from 1992 to 1994, Tong may have been the one that made the most Chinese think of day and night". Many victims of World War II came to Beijing from all over China to seek help from Tong Zeng. He called on the victims of World War II to write to the Japanese Embassy in China for an apology and compensation. In October 1992, the Emperor of Japan visited China for the first time. Tong publicly expressed his request for the Emperor of Japan to apologize for the invasion of China during World War II and compensate the Chinese victims. During the Emperor of Japan's visit to China, Tong was sent away to Chongqing by his work unit for a "business trip", AP reported. In March 1994, Tong asked the visiting Japanese Prime Minister Hosokawa to apologize and pay compensation to the Chinese victims of World War II. He also called on the victims of World War II to protest in front of the Japanese Embassy in Beijing, as UPI took the lead in reporting many times. The Chinese government stopped Tong and he was detained for three days. China has released more than 100 elderly activists after two days of questioning.

In March 1995, Tong Zeng was warned not to cooperate with national legislators and consultants and asked for individual compensation from Japan. On the other hand, the police banned protest bids by victims, and the Chinese official agencies also asked Tong Zeng to stay away from World War II elders. In August 1995, Tong Zeng organized a news conference for comfort women and World War II victims in a hotel in Beijing, which was halted by the Chinese police. Tong Zeng led the Chinese victims to Japan to file a lawsuit, United Press International reported. As a result, his passport was confiscated. The Reformatorisch Dagblad of Dutch Protestant newspaper also published the AP news. In 1995, the Fourth World Women Conference was held in Huairou, Beijing. Tong was an NGO representative approved by the United Nations and participated in the "Comfort Women Forum". He participated in many preparatory meetings for it in Beijing. The New York Times and the Tampa Bay Times also reported that police warned Tong Zeng not to hold a press conference or cause any trouble until the end of the women's conference, to be held on September 9 under the auspices of the United Nations. However, a few days before the meeting, Tong was sent to a remote area of China. The Trouw newspaper in the Netherlands and the Deseret News, a newspaper in Salt Lake City, Utah, United States, forwarded the AP news, saying that Tong Zeng was arrested and had a hunger strike. The Trouw again used Reuters news to confirm that Tong was arrested. The Christian Science Monitor in the United States also mentioned in a report that the Chinese authorities briefly detained the famous Chinese war victim compensation activist Tong Zeng.Le Monde diplomatique (France) made a summary, on August 7, 1995, when the police dissolved the press conference demanding compensation from Japan. In recent years, Tong Zeng has become the main spokesman for hundreds of thousands of Chinese victims, who were arrested by the police and prohibited from contacting the media. His passport was confiscated. In 1995, US President Clinton raised the issue of human rights before meeting with Chinese President Jiang Zemin. It also mentioned that Tong Zeng was "invited" to leave the city before the UN World Conference on women.

Subsequently, Dagens Nyheter of Sweden reported on Tong Zeng's situation. Since then, Dagens Nyheter has repeatedly reported that Tong Zeng was mentioned in Sino-Japanese relations. The Associated Press reported how Tong Zeng persisted in his beliefs and pursuits: Official China Retreats in Tone on War Against Japan: "Almost every family was affected by the war, so the government fears our work will influence all society," said Tong Zeng, a researcher on the aging who started the compensation campaign nearly six years ago. "They also fear it will affect relations with Japan, especially economic relations." Having been previously pressured to curb his efforts, Tong knew that the 50th anniversary of the war's end would not dramatically alter China's official attitude. But he remained committed to getting the Japanese government to pay for the sufferings it caused. "The government abandoned" retribution, Tong said. "But we as a people shouldn't. We cannot abandon it."

For the past six years, Mr Tong has devoted much of his time to the war reparation campaign. But he often ran into trouble with the authorities. Unexpectedly, Tong Zeng's personal passport was confiscated for six years. Twenty years later, Jessica Chen Weiss, American political scientist, the "Comparative Politics: Chinese Politics International Relations" published by Oxford University Press in 2014 recorded the 1995 Tong Zeng barred from international conference in Beijing; Police broke up foreign press conference and other encounters. Le Monde (France) commented from another angle in a report: "Tong Zeng is the leader of a pressure group" In 1997, Linda Yeung, a reporter of the South China Morning Post in Hong Kong, had a long report on the civil claim against Japan initiated by Tong Zeng. In 2001, Albert Ho, the Hong Kong legislator, mentioned in the Legislative Council that Mr. Tong Zeng's early activities were suppressed. Chinese WWII elderly wrote to President Jiang Zemin, "We old people victimised by the war all see Tong Zeng as our guide, as our benefactor."

=== Strive for the legitimate rights and interests of "comfort women" victims of sexual violence in World War II ===
Tong Zeng mentioned in his "Book of Ten Thousand Words" written in 1990 that sexual violence against women is a war crime and there should be compensation for the victims. On July 25, 1992, Tong received materials from seven comfort women in Shanxi, China, requesting claims from Japan. On August 7, 1992, he went to the Japanese Embassy in China to submit the Chinese comfort women's claim, and the Japanese embassy staff signed for his materials. UPI reported this in detail, The New York Times also reported it.

In 1992, three Korean comfort women went to Beijing to find Tong. The uteruses of the three elderly women had all been removed by the Japanese army. They also showed Tong Zeng the scars left by them. Tong sent them to the South Korean Embassy in China. One of the Korean comfort women named Hong Aizhen also wrote a letter of thanks to Tong. On August 7, 1995, Tong Zeng organized a press conference for comfort women victims in Beijing, demanding compensation from Japan. Tong Zeng, as a "NGO" representative of the fourth women's conference held in Beijing in 1995, would participate in the "comfort women" forum, but he failed to participate in it. Because of the sensitivity of Tong Zeng, Chinese semi-official organizations also avoid the issue of comfort women at the World Women's Congress. A documentary film made by Japanese volunteers also describes Tong Zeng's difficult journey in safeguarding the human rights of Chinese comfort women in his early years. In 1995, Tong Zeng organized Japanese lawyers to collect evidence from Chinese comfort women in China. In 1996, Tong Zeng appealed to the Hong Kong media that the Chinese authorities should issue passports to two Chinese comfort women. Since then, comfort women from China, the Netherlands, and others have sued Japan one after another. In October 2002, Tong Zeng wrote court testimony for Chinese "comfort women", which was submitted by Japanese lawyers to the Tokyo High Court of Japan. Since 2007, Tong Zeng has organized economic assistance activities to Chinese comfort women survivors many times. Tong felt that the issue of comfort women in 2015 has become an issue of concern to the Chinese and Japanese governments. In February 2015, Tong Zeng introduced Lucy Hornby, a senior reporter from the Financial Times, to Shanxi, China, to interview Japanese military comfort women during World War II. Folha de S. Paulo (Brazil) also reposted it in full. Zhang Shuangbing, a teacher in Shanxi, China, has followed Tong Zeng to safeguard the rights and interests of comfort women to this day. The movement of World War II comfort women in China, South Korea, the Netherlands, the Philippines and other countries to ask Japan's apology and compensation for more than 20 years has been recorded in detail from the UN report. Tong Zeng entrusted a Japanese lawyer to represent the victims of Chinese comfort women in the Japanese court to sue Japan, which is very meaningful. The doctoral thesis of Xiaoyang Hao, Kyushu University, Japan: Chinese "Comfort Women" Reparation Trials in the 1990s and 2000s.

=== Conclusion and significance ===
The proceedings of the reparation trials also carry implications for other civil litigations elsewhere adjudicating sexual violence, in a world fraught with sexual and gender-based historical injustice and ongoing sexual violence in armed conflict.

On December 29, 2015, Japan reached an agreement on apology and compensation for South Korean comfort women. Voice of America immediately interviewed Tong Zeng for comment. He said it was a good start, but he also expressed regret. Daily Star (United Kingdom) reposted the AFP report, Beijing-based activist Tong Zeng told AFP that the agreement between Seoul and Tokyo was "a really big shock" for China. "Japan to this day has not given an apology or compensation to comfort women in countries like China and the Philippines," he said. As the war's "biggest victim," he added, China "needs to continue to strive to compel Japan to apologize as soon as possible." "Otherwise, it won't be good for history or regional peace." Some mainstream media in Southeast Asia NDTV (Indian), Republika, The Straits Times (Singapore), etc. have also reprinted. Les Echos (France) specifically mentioned Tong Zeng's attitude when synthesizing AFP and Reuters news. As the "biggest victim" of the war, China "must continue to strive for Japan's apology," Financial Times said that Tong Zeng was the closest professional agitator in China, and his long-term campaign successfully put the issue of comfort women on the agenda of the Communist Party.

On April 28, 2018, the statue of comfort women in Manila, the Philippines, was demolished at night. Tong Zeng said that this behavior was an indulgence of crimes against humanity. However, the statue of comfort women is still erected in some places in South Korea, China, the United States, Germany, Australia and other countries because it symbolizes the end of wartime sexual violence.

At the end of 1995, Tong Zeng received a letter from Cheng Fei, the adopted daughter of Yuan Zhulin, a former Japanese army comfort woman in Wuhan, China. Tong sent Yuan Zhulin to Hong Kong in 1998 to make it public. Li Bihua, a famous writer in Hong Kong, wrote a book The Cloudy and Misty March with her life experience. Zhulin has repeatedly complained about the sex slavery system of Japanese comfort women in World War II in the international community. In 2007, Tong Zeng went to Wuhan to attend the memorial service of Zhulin. At this time, Tong Zeng advocated in Chinese society the care and economic assistance for the elderly victims of World War II, including "comfort women", so that the victims of World War II can enjoy their old age. European Parliament resolution of 13 December 2007 on Justice for the 'Comfort Women' . Japan must do more for WWII 'comfort women': UN. The Pope's Verdict on Japan's Comfort Women. The last Chinese comfort woman who sued the Japanese government died. Why is it so hard for Japan to say sorry?

On the 2021 International Women's Day, peace activist Tong Zeng, together with the United Nations High Commissioner for Human Rights Michelle Bachelet, the Secretary General of the United Nations António Guterres and others, congratulated on the happy Women's Day on the website of the Urban Economic Forum!

=== For countries that have committed the "holocaust" to civilians, they must apologize and compensate ===
From 1990 to 1997, Tong Zeng was a wanted man. Seven years after he vowed to pursue reparations for thousands of mainland victims of Japanese atrocities during the 1930s war in China and World War II, in October 1998, Tong Zeng, a 42-year-old associate researcher, was dismissed from his work unit. On April 29, 2002, Zhang Weiguo, a reporter from China's World Economic Herald, wrote a commentary on Tong Zeng. "China usually only has the government monopolize the voice of speech, especially in the field of foreign policy including relations with Japan. The outside world can hardly hear the voice of the people. Tong Zeng and some human rights activists have carried out compensation activities against Japan in recent years. It must be vivid and colorful, and it has opened up a new world for public opinion".

After more than 10 years of efforts, Tong Zeng has gradually expanded his space for activities, and has been reported by China's mainstream media. Since 2004, he has advocated suing Japan and Japanese enterprises in Chinese courts. On April 4, 2006, Tong Zeng planned to file a lawsuit in Chinese courts, and five Chinese law firms accepted the entrustment. In addition, Tong Zeng published a signed article in China Youth Daily. His view is that it is in line with international law and practice to regard Japanese government loans as compensation for war victims He did not expect to arouse the common dissatisfaction of Chinese and Japanese officials. Japanese ambassador to China, Keiji Inouchu, wrote a special article against Tong Zeng's point of view. In May 2004, Nikkei Asia, Japan's English-language newsweekly, said that Tong Zeng is the first Chinese activist advocating wartime compensation from Japanese companies. In 2014, Tong Zeng estimated that only 100 workers survived; He actively promoted the victims to submit claim materials to courts across the country.

In May 2014, China's World War II victims submitted claim materials to China's Shandong court and sued Japan's Mitsubishi company. Tong Zeng told Reuters at the time, dozens of wartime compensation suits had been filed in Japan against the Japanese government and companies associated with the country's wartime aggression in the first half of the 20th century, including World War II. Almost all of them have been rejected by Japanese courts. This case of suing Japan's Mitsubishi company has also attracted the attention of the media in some Southeast Asian countries.

On July 15, 2014, an area in Hebei Province of China entrusted Tong Zeng's NGO to sue the Japanese government. 1298 villagers were killed and 96 were injured during a massacre by Japanese troops on January 25, 1941, in the Panjiayu Village of North China's Hebei province.

On August 11, 2014, Tong Zeng delivered a letter to Japan's Ambassador and asked the Emperor of Japan to return Chinese cultural relics. Chinese state media also reported Chinese NGO seeks return of ancient relic from Japan. The AFP issued a news report for this purpose, especially quoting a sentence by Tong Zeng "What we try to recover is not just the relic itself, but also a symbol of international justice." Jane Perlez is the president of the Beijing branch of the New York Times, specializing in interviews with Tong Zeng and others, and providing more extensive coverage. An art website forwarded the news and got 390000 people's praise. On November 22, 2022, thanks to the cooperation and promotion between Tong Zeng and Japanese lawyers for many years, the Japanese civil society appealed to the Japanese government to return the Chinese cultural relics seized during the war to China. On June 8, 2023, Mr. Tong Zeng wrote a letter to the Japanese government requesting the return of Chinese cultural relics in front of the Yasukuni Shrine in Japan.

On December 8, 2014, Chinese NGO represented by Tong Zeng asked Japan to apologize for the 1937 Nanjing Massacre. The Associated Press reported Tong Zeng's action in detail Japan Today media also reprinted the news that the Associated Press reported that Tong Zeng sent a letter asking the Japanese government to apologize for the 1937 massacre. In an interview with a reporter from China Youth Daily, Tong Zeng said: "In the long run, solving historical problems is to promote Sino-Japanese friendship. Only when these problems are resolved Sino-Japanese relations will be able to easily face the future." Japan and South Korea have also reported on Mr. Tong's actions.

On August 15, 2015, Ms. Xia Shuqin, a survivor of the Nanjing Massacre who knew Tong Zeng since 1995, asked the Japanese government to apologize for the "Nanjing Massacre" in an interview with the Australian Broadcasting Corporation reporter.

On December 12, 2016, Tong Zeng revealed to a reporter from China News Service that he had recently sent a letter to the Japanese government and Prime Minister Shinzo Abe through the Japanese Ambassador to China, asking the Japanese government to apologize for the 300,000 deaths in Nanjing caused by the Japanese army. Tong Zeng's activity was reprinted by the most official mainstream media of China for the first time.

On December 11, 2017, Tong Zeng, on behalf of his NGO in China, once again asked the Japanese government to apologize for the Nanjing Massacre.

On December 11, 2018, Tong Zeng wrote to the Japanese government: "I hope the Japanese government can seriously reflect on the war crimes and apologize for the Nanjing Massacre." It has been reported and reprinted by many Chinese mainstream media. December 13 is the memorial day for the victims of the Nanjing Massacre. In the news reports reprinted on the website of Xinhua News Agency, Tong Zeng was specifically mentioned as a non-governmental figure, and was praised for his unremitting efforts for more than 20 years to recover justice and dignity for the victims.

On December 12, 2019, Tong Zeng sent another letter to ask the Japanese government to apologize for the Nanjing Massacre.

On December 9, 2021, The Eighth Letter from Tong Zeng to the Japanese Government Demanding Apology and Compensation for the Nanjing Massacre.

On December 12, 2022, Tong Zeng wrote to the Japanese ambassador and the Japanese government for the ninth consecutive year, requesting the Japanese government to apologize and compensate for the "Nanjing Massacre" war crime committed 85 years ago.

=== Strive to apologize and compensate wartime forced laborers ===
In the "Book of Ten Thousand Words" written by Tong Zeng in 1990, it was specifically mentioned that one of the war crimes was forcing civilians to work as laborers. In 1992, he began to receive letters from Chinese labor survivors and survivors' families who were caught by the Japanese army to perform hard labor throughout Japan during World War II, some letters were from the relatives of those who died in Japan. Some forced laborers dug mud in Hokkaido, Japan, some dug caves in Gunma County, Japan, some built reservoirs in Kagoshima, Japan, etc. There were also some Chinese who were forced to do hard labor in the areas controlled by the Japanese army in China, they all hoped to entrust Tong Zeng to claim compensation from Japan. From 1992 to 1994, Tong Zeng told forced laborer survivors and their families to write to the Japanese Embassy in China to claim their rights and interests. At the same time, Tong Zeng was also entrusted to disclose historical documents in Tianjin archives show. Tong will release Tianjin archives to the outside world through the media. THE Japanese Army forced Chinese women into prostitution and enslaved about 9.2 million laborers and their families in northern China during World War II.

In August 1994, Tong Zeng commissioned Japanese lawyers to sue the Japanese government and Japanese companies in courts across Japan. Chinese forced laborers of World War II began to sue the Japanese government and Japanese companies in Japanese courts. On May 7, 2018, China's most open mainstream media "China Youth Daily" published an entire page (which was very rare) of Tong Zeng's experience, as well as a detailed report on the records of Tong Zeng's process of entrusting a Japanese lawyer in 1994.

In August 2000, due to the strong demands of World War II forced laborers from the United States, Israel, Poland, the Czech Republic, Russia and other countries, Germany agreed to establish the Foundation Remembrance, Responsibility and Future to compensate them.

In March 2003, five Chinese forced laborers commissioned American lawyers to sue Japan's Mitsubishi and Mitsui companies in the U.S. court.

On September 18, 2003, Tong Zeng went to the Sapporo Court of Hokkaido, Japan, to testify for Chinese forced laborers of Mitsubishi, Mitsui and other companies.

In 2007, Tong Zeng initiated economic assistance campaign to support 586 Chinese laborers of World War II.

In 2014, China World War II Labor Association commissioned Tong Zeng's organization to promote the prosecution of Japanese Mitsubishi and other companies in Chinese courts. Tong contacted and assisted some lawyers, and successively filed cases against Japanese companies in Beijing, Hebei and other local courts. BBC, Financial Times and other media interviewed labor plaintiffs and their families. Tong has always believed that Chinese victims of World War II have the right to sue the Japanese government and Japanese companies in Chinese courts. In an interview with Reuters, he emphasized that "the families base their claim on the belief that Beijing did not forfeit the rights of individual war victims to seek compensation in the agreement signed between China and Japan in 1972". In May 2014, the U.S. District Court also began to file a case in which U.S. laborers sued Japan's Mitsubishi Corporation. The US "Time" magazine also participated in the report.

On October 26, 2014, Tong Zeng, in the name of the chairman of the China Federation of Demanding Compensation from Japan, wrote to Mitsubishi Corporation of Japan, asking the company to apologize and compensate Chinese laborers.

On July 19, 2015, Japan's Mitsubishi finally apologized in the United States for the atrocities against American war laborers of World War II. CBS, CNN and other mainstream media have reported it. Tong Zeng noticed that in the media reports, it was mentioned that Japanese Mitsubishi executives were very concerned about the victimized labor in China. On July 25, 2015, Tong disclosed to the outside world the manuscript of the letter of apology from Mitsubishi Japan to Chinese forced laborers. On one hand, Tong Zeng urged Mitsubishi Japan to apologize and compensate the Chinese forced laborers as soon as possible. On the other hand, Tong Zeng said Mitsubishi's apology should be given positive comments, saying that he hoped other Japanese companies can follow suit. British PR magazine PRWeek praised, Mitsubishi: A gallant apology!

After Tong published the Mitsubishi apology letter, a media commented on Mitsubishi: Too Little, Quite Late . Unexpectedly, the website of the Chinese Consulate General in New York also forwarded Tong's news.

On June 1, 2016, Mitsubishi Corporation of Japan officially reached a settlement with Chinese laborers. Mitsubishi apologized to Chinese laborers and agreed to pay 100000 yuan per person to more than 3000 people as an apology and build monuments in several places in Japan. The representative of Mitsubishi, Japan, signed a reconciliation agreement with the representatives of three Chinese victims. The BBC, The New York Times, The Wall Street Journal, The Guardian, and other mainstream media reported it. That afternoon, three representatives of the victims of Mitsubishi visited Tong Zeng, expressed their gratitude to Tong Zeng and presented him a banner "kindness as heavy as a mountain"; they also gifted Tong a banner "National Hero", but Tong Zeng did not accept them .

On June 6, 2016, The Diplomat reported on Mitsubishi's apology to Chinese forced laborers that it is particularly implicit that not everyone agrees with Tong Zeng's views.

On August 13, 2016, Tong Zeng disclosed to the media all the contents of the Mitsubishi and Chinese laborers settlement agreement. Tong said, "The process is very hard because it involves China's domestic law, Japanese law and international law." Today, 71 years after the war, it is better late than never. Compensation payments are successively distributed to the families of victims in China.

On June 13, 2016, Tong Zeng sent another letter to the Japanese government in the name of civil society, asking for an apology and compensation for 40000 Chinese forced laborers. On November 27, 2017, Tong Zeng, together with Japanese lawyers, called on the Japanese government to apologize for the labor policy of that year.

South Korean laborers are still suing Mitsubishi, waiting for an apology from Mitsubishi and other Japanese companies. There is a victim who was forced into doing hard work for Japan's Mitsubishi as a 15-year-old girl, who was 92 years old in 2016 and still sincerely hoping Mitsubishi will apologize.

Tong Zeng has been asking the Japanese government and Japanese companies to apologize and compensate the Chinese forced laborers for 30 years. The process has gone through three stages: "writing to the Japanese Embassy", "legal proceedings" and "reaching a settlement." Tong Zeng helped Liu Lianren, a Chinese laborer by commissioning a Japanese lawyer to sue the Japanese government in 1995. The second year after his death, on July 12, 2000, the Tokyo District Court of Japan ruled that the Japanese government should compensate Liu Lianren. The Japanese government filed an appeal. Tokyo High Court denied Compensation for Forced Laborer, Liu Lianren was not compensated. Chinese forced laborer Li Liangjie joined the litigation team immediately after meeting Tong Zeng in 1994. In 2007, Li Liangjie was elected president of the World War II Labor Association. On July 22, 2017, Tong Zeng and Li Liangjie introduced the history of Chinese civil claims against Japan to historians, history teachers, lawyers and community leaders in the United States and Canada. Li Liangjie died on February 12, 2019. Tong Zeng expressed deep condolences on Li Liangjie's death. Tong Zeng said: "as a labor plaintiff of World War II, Li Liangjie sued the crimes of Japanese militarism through legal means, which reflected the dignity and determination of Chinese people to resolutely oppose war and support peace!"

=== Families of the victims of the "human experiments" and survivors of the bacteriological war ===
In Article 4 of Part II of the "Book of Ten Thousand Words" written by Tong Zeng in 1990, he proposed that the manufacture and use of toxic, chemical and bacteriological weapons as means and methods of warfare are war crimes in accordance with international law. In World War II, the Japanese army took living people as test objects, manufactured and produced chemical bacteriological weapons, and carried out chemical bacteriological warfare in China. Since 1992, Tong has received letters from victims of the Japanese army's chemical and bacteriological warfare in China. The Japanese army spread cholera bacteria, resulting in the death of five people in one family. Some villagers died abnormally from live typhoid bacteria injected by the Japanese army. Some became lifelong victims of dysentery. Some Chinese forced laborers in Japan have also been used in unethical human experiment. Some were collective letters from a village accusing the Japanese army of many atrocities, including bacterial warfare. Some victims of bacteriological warfare entrusted a newspaper to send a letter to Tong Zeng. In particular, a letter from a descendant of a plague victim was transferred to the local association for aging through the newspaper, then sent to Tong Zeng.

Tong Zeng received a letter from Wang Yibing and Wang Guilan in March 1994. Their father was sent to the Japanese Unit 731 as a human experiment object. Tong Zeng introduced them to Japanese lawyers at the end of 1994 as typical representatives of the 731 case. In 1995, a lawsuit was filed in the Japanese court. Although in 1999, the Tokyo District Court of Japan rejected Wang Yibing's request for the Japanese government to apologize and compensate on the ground of "the state has no responsibility", the court recognized the fact of inhuman persecution by Unit 731. The gendarmerie who personally arrested Wang Yibing's father into Unit 731 personally apologized to Wang Yibing, "My guilt is as serious as of the leader of bacterial warfare Shiro Ishii I apologise to you all, and all family members of the victims. I will regret this for my entire life." The former Japanese gendarmerie also testified for the descendants of the victims of the human experiments of Unit 731 in a Japanese court.

Ms. Guo Jinglan, whose husband was forcibly sent to the Unit 731 of Japanese army and disappeared, disclosed her misfortune in an interview with the Associated Press in 1993. In 1994, Tong Zeng learned about Guo Jinglan's misfortune and entrusted others to find her. Guo Jinglan and her daughter immediately went from Harbin to Beijing to meet Tong Zeng and insisted on claiming compensation from Japan. Tong Zeng introduced her to a Japanese lawyer and filed a lawsuit in a Japanese court. She testified in court in 1997. In 1999, the Tokyo court of Japan ruled that the court recognized the fact of murder, but rejected her claim for an apology from the Japanese government. In 2005, Agence France Presse for the first time reported that the Japanese court rejected her claim again. This final judgment has attracted extensive media attention. Guo Jinglan said she would not give up and fight to the end.

Tong Zeng received a letter from Wang Huanbin from the Jinhua area of Zhejiang Province who had experienced the bacterial warfare by the Japanese army, telling Tong Zeng that the plague had caused many of his relatives deaths. The lawsuit was filed in a Japanese court with the support of Japanese lawyers, and scale of the action was the largest. "Yesterday, a Tokyo court for the first time acknowledged that Japan had engaged in biological warfare, slaughtering thousands of Chinese civilians in one of the worst atrocities of the second world war". On March 16, 2010, the reference part (34) of a document published by Cambridge University Press pointed out that senior Chinese diplomatic officials had a vague attitude on the issue of the victims of World War II demanding compensation from Japan.

In 2007, Tong Zeng launched assistance activities for victims of chemical and bacteriological warfare and victims harmed by chemical weapons left over by the Japanese army in China.

On January 26, 2018, Tong Zeng sent a letter to the Japanese government in the name of a non-governmental organization, asking the Japanese government to apologize and compensate for launching the bacteriological war.

April 29, 2019, was the 22nd anniversary of the formal implementation of the United Nations Convention on the prohibition of chemical weapons, an international arms control treaty. Tong Zeng sent letters to the Japanese government and the United Nations Organization for the prohibition of chemical weapons, requesting the complete destruction and removal of chemical bacterial gas bombs left in China, and an apology and compensation for the Chinese people for the manufacture and use of gas bombs by the Japanese army in China during World War II.

=== Protect the rights and interests of victims of indiscriminate bombing ===
In the fifth item of the "Book of Ten Thousand Words" by Tong Zeng, according to the provisions of international law, indiscriminate bombing is a war crime. Some letters written by victims to Tong Zeng describe horrors of carpet bombing by Japanese military planes in Chongqing, known as the "Bombing of Chongqing" in history. There are letters from the victims of the "Wuhan Indiscriminate Bombing" in China. There are letters from the victims of the "Nanjing Indiscriminate Bombing." There are also letters sent to him by victims of indiscriminate bombing in small and medium-sized cities.

In 1992, Tong Zeng began to receive several letters from Gao Xiongfei, an associate professor at Zhejiang Institute of Education in China. He was only four years old in 1943, and his right hand was blown up by a bomb dropped by a Japanese plane. At midnight one spring day in 1993, Tong Zeng and Gao Xiongfei met for the first time. In March 1994, Gao Xiongfei went directly to the Chinese Ministry of Foreign Affairs to petition for compensation against Japan. A diplomat said that Tong Zeng is a small person, and we cannot make claims against Japan based on what the small person said; Gao Xiongfei immediately retorted, " Most great truth is discovered and put forward by small people. If there are more people who insist on it, it can promote the progress of society." At the end of 1994, Tong Zeng introduced Gao Xiongfei to Japanese lawyer as a typical representative of indiscriminate bombing. In August 1995, Gao Xiong flew to the Tokyo District Court of Japan to submit the claim materials. In 1999, Tong Zeng received materials from Gao Xiongfei about their litigation in Japanese courts. In 2015, Cai Xiuling, who was studying for a master's degree in law in the United States, wrote a defense paper on Gao Xiongfei, Tong Zeng and other claims against Japan and published it at the University of Pittsburgh. In July 2017, Tong Zeng introduced the course of claims against Japan to the visiting delegations of the United States and Canada. Gao Xiongfei and several World War II survivors immediately attracted the strong attention of the participants. Gao Xiongfei was also interviewed by Hong Kong's South China Morning Post.

In 2004, Tong Zeng and the victims of the indiscriminate bombing in Chongqing discussed how to sue the Japanese government. Tong Zeng also advocated in the Chinese media that the victims of the indiscriminate bombing in Chongqing sue the Japanese government. In March 2006, 188 Chinese who were injured or lost their families in the "indiscriminate bombing of Chongqing" entrusted Japanese lawyers to formally sue the Japanese government for compensation and apology. In 2008, Tong Zeng and other groups provided economic assistance to the survivors of the " bombing". The litigation of victims of the "Chongqing bombing" in Japanese courts has aroused the attention of Chinese and foreign media. In 2017, the Japanese court recognized the facts, but rejected the claims and apologies demanded by the victims of the Chongqing bombing on the grounds that the Chinese government waived war compensation. Tong Zeng repeatedly expressed his views in many media interviews in the past, that is, the Chinese government's abandonment of war compensation does not mean that Chinese individuals should give up the right to seek individual compensation.

=== 30 years of achievements ===
On August 15, 1995, the Japanese Prime Minister apologized for invading Asian countries during World War II. Tong Zeng made a positive evaluation of this. The New York Times also made an objective evaluation of Japan's apology. Tong Zeng has been persisting in asking the Japanese Prime Minister to apologize for aggression against other countries during World War II, since he launched a campaign to demand Japan's apology and compensation in 1990. Later on, South Korean civilian groups and Japanese anti-war groups also strongly demanded the Japanese government to apologize. Further, a large number of Japanese veterans came to China and apologized in some memorable places, some even found the descendants of Chinese victims and apologized to them. CNN, AP, and other media reported on the incident.

From 1994 to 2007, Tong and Chinese war victims initiated and urged 25 lawsuits filed in Japanese courts with the help of over 300 Japanese lawyers. Japanese courts also affirmed the Nanjing Massacre, Pingdingshan Massacre, Comfort Women, facts of war crimes such as war labor, human body testing, and germ warfare. However, Japan's Top Court Poised to Kill Lawsuits by Chinese War Victim. In an interview with VOA, Tong Zeng said that during the Second World War, Japan committed crimes against humanity and war crimes. For crimes like these, the punishment of these crimes is not subject to the limitation of time. Since 2007, Tong Zeng and his team urged five Japanese companies to apologize or compensate victims in China and reached a settlement. Japanese companies compensated the Chinese victims with about 300 million yuan. In 2021, Mitsubishi Materials Corporation of Japan established a monument in a park in Nagasaki, Japan, The inscription also featured an apology from Mitsubishi Materials, saying it "sincerely acknowledges" the fact that Chinese laborers' human rights were violated. On October 2, 2022, Tong Zeng disclosed on the social platform that Mitsubishi Materials of Japan had paid the 27th instalment of compensation to the survivors of Chinese labor and their families, with a total of 1248 people receiving compensation.

In addition, China's Zhongwei Company sued Mitsui Merchants in the Shanghai Maritime Court of China. After 20 years of litigation, it finally received 240 million yuan in compensation from Mitsui Merchants in 2014. Since Tong Zeng has supported and helped the Chinese plaintiff for more than 20 years, both Chinese and international media have been learning about the situation from Tong. On December 23, 2007, Tong Zeng disclosed to the media that China had won the first instance, "It can offer valuable experience in the resolution of international disputes." On January 11, 2008, Tong disclosed to the Chinese media that both the plaintiff and the defendant had appealed. Tong Zeng posted a message on his own Weibo on April 19, 2014, stating that Chinese court seized a 280,000-ton ship from Japan's Mitsui Shipping Co., Ltd. as compensation for the property losses suffered by the original Chinese Zhongwei Shipping Company during World War II. Tong Zeng said that this was a milestone in the Chinese people's mission of demanding compensation from Japan. Hong Kong's Wen Wei Po reported about it on the following day. Reuters has interviewed Tong Zeng and published related reports twice, NRK (Norway), Sydney Morning Herald (Australia), Firstpost (Mumbai, India), etc. and Professional media in many other countries have reported as well. The Financial Times reported on Mr. Tong's Influence in this way: "Tong Zeng, a rights activist who electrified China when he first proposed individual reparations in the early 1990s and advised the Chen family in its complaint against Mitsui OSK."

According to Tong, the ultimate goal of his 30 years' continuous efforts in this cause is to promote Sino-Japanese friendship and World Peace. The most official media in China also expressed Tong Zeng's view, that is, civil claims for post-war compensation aims at peace and friendship between China and Japan. Tong Zeng is very grateful to his Japanese friends for their help, It is very touching to see that some Japanese lawyers have provided legal helps for China's WWII victims for free for more than 20 years. They did it all for justice and peace." A publication of the Harvard University Asia Center called the history of civil compensation initiated after the war "Toward a History Beyond Borders".Cambridge University Press, "Injury and injustice", Mr. Tong Zeng was called Chinese postwar compensation activist. James Reilly, a post-doctoral research fellow at the University of Oxford, in the publication of Columbia University Press, wrote: "Tong Zeng is said to be one of the most influential historical activists in China."

In 2015, Dr. Don Tow, a Chinese-American, summed up Tong Zeng's efforts and contributions for civil victims to claim compensation from Japan over the years, and determined to organize the establishment of a website based on the letters from victims of World War II that Tong Zeng received in his early years. One year later, "10000 Cries For Justice – Tong Zeng's Collection" website started operating, informing people of unknown atrocities committed by the Japanese military. China's top official media, Xinhua News Agency, also reported the opening of the website. The news also appeared on the website of the Chinese Foreign Ministry's Office in Hong Kong, and translate the news into Spanish and other languages for dissemination. July 25, 2018, At The 13th International Conference on Inter-disciplinary Social Sciences, University of Granada, Spain, discuss and promote the Letters to Tong Zeng. In April 2021, letters to Tong Zeng was published, which contains some letters written by the victims of WWII to Tong Zeng 30 years ago.

== Non-war communication and non-violent communication ==
Territorial disputes have always been the fuse of wars between countries. After the war, the Falklands War broke out, and the total number of casualties on both sides was nearly 3,000. The dispute between China and Japan is mainly because of the Diaoyu Islands in the East China Sea. In 1996, Tong Zeng responded to and supported the movement of the citizens of Taiwan and Hong Kong to defend the Diaoyu Islands. Beijing authorities tells Activists to Stop Protests, Tong Zeng told a Reuter reporter over a telephone interview that he is going to carry out the protest as planned, despite the warning. According to CNN, Tong Zeng's protests are still banned, and he might even be detained. The New York Times, The Washington Post and other media also reported that Tong was expelled from Beijing again. In the 1996 China human rights report released by the US State Department in January 1997, it was mentioned that the Chinese government forced Tong Zeng to leave Beijing for Gansu Province. Conor o'clery, a senior reporter of The Irish Times, reported twice, saying that Tong Zeng was recently forced to leave Beijing when he was threatening to hold unauthorized demonstrations at the Japanese embassy. The Independent later reported that other members of Tong Zeng's team were also sent out of Beijing. The late Nobel Peace Prize winner, Mr. Liu Xiaobo, issued a joint statement in November 1996 protesting against authorities' suppression of anti-Japanese civil demonstrations in the mainland, banning demonstrations and expelling Tong Zeng. Hong Kong democrat Albert Ho and 10 others took to the streets to protest against the suppression of Tong Zeng's activities. Tong was acting in a peaceful and rational manner and did not affect social stability.

In 2004, Tong Zeng organized people to go to Diaoyu Island in the form of scientific investigation and tourism route investigation, his actions were more rational. Agence France Presse took the lead in reporting. China's mainstream media also reported. Tong said that rational and constructive actions should be taken. On March 24, 2004, he skillfully planned the Chinese to disembark on the Diaoyu Island for scientific investigation. Unexpectedly, it caused a diplomatic storm between the two governments. In interviews with ABC, The Wall Street Journal and other media, Tong made it clear that his actions were part of a civil movement and were consistent with the position of the Chinese government. The police were also polite to the protesters in front of the Japanese Embassy in Beijing. Tong also went to the Japanese Embassy to protest. In China, the space for non-governmental activities entirely depends on itself. The Guardian also mentioned in the report that Tong admitted that he has won more space for civil activities. Therefore, Tong's behavior has triggered the latest diplomatic crisis and has been criticized and regarded as the voice of "Radicalism". But Tong Zeng is not an irrational fanatic. In published by Stanford University Press 2016 《Appendix: Opinion Leaders Interviewed》, Tong Zeng was called a citizen activist.

Since 2005, Tong Zeng has made a new attempt on solving the controversial Diaoyu Island issue between China and Japan. He proposed leasing the Diaoyu Island and transferring Diaoyu Island issue from official to civil matter. Reapplication was made in July 2012. The BBC published an article the next day saying that Tong Zeng applied to the China Oceanic Administration for renting the disputed island. The Diplomat believes that Tong Zeng has damaged the diplomatic relations between China and Japan. Tong pointed out in July 2005 that Japan's unauthorized establishment of the middle line on the high seas violated international law. On October 8, 2005, he pointed out that the Japanese Prime Minister's visit to the Yasukuni Shrine dedicated to class A war criminals of World War II clearly violated international law. The dialogue and debate between Tong Zeng and Japanese right-wing groups in 2005 were cancelled for some reasons. When other non-governmental activists were treated unfairly, Tong also defended them.

In September 2010, a Chinese fishing boat in Fujian Province was forcibly rammed by several Japanese warships near the Diaoyu Islands. It was generally believed that China will erupt the same anti-Japanese demonstrations as in the past. In an interview with Reuters, Tong Zeng said that he believes that China's street demonstrations need to go through petitions and diplomatic build up before they erupt. He emphasized that the current situation is different from the past, and there will be no large-scale anti-Japanese demonstrations. Tong has always believed that negotiation should be the major instrument in resolving territorial disputes. His views are not isolated.

Tong Zeng is the one who had the most contact with the victims of World War II. He is well aware that there is a strong anti-Japanese sentiment among the Chinese people, and the government should pay attention to it. When a Hong Kong reporter asked him whether he personally hated Japan, Tong replied that he did not hate the Japanese and admired the Japanese from the bottom of his heart. The Japanese also made some contributions to mankind. Tong is a scholar who is rational and peaceful in dealing with issues between China and Japan. As reported by the Financial Times on May 8, 2008, Tong Zeng was only concerned about strong anti-Japanese sentiment and urged the government to resolve the issue between China and Japan. In 2012, Reuters reported that Tong Zeng predicted that as Chinese public opinion grew stronger, the Chinese government would change accordingly. Tong Zeng did not simply initiate protests. He often made statements or personally wrote letters to the Japanese Embassy to express his position.

On March 30, 2005, Tong Zeng wrote a letter to UN Secretary General Kofi Annan opposing Japan's accession to the permanent membership. Chinese official media reported the content of Tong Zeng's letter. On April 10, 2005, Newsweek reported that Tong Zeng participated in and promoted more than 20 million Chinese people to sign against Japan's accession to the permanent membership of the United Nations. Tong Zeng told Joseph Kahn (journalist) of The New York Times that this petition reflects that civil actions started ahead of the government. "China must vote AGAINST and not just abstain", said Tong Zeng, a longtime organizer of efforts to force Japan to recognize and apologize for World War II atrocities. "The government may not want to take the lead, but the Chinese people have taken the lead". The New York Times quoted Mr. Tong in another report as saying that the Chinese government has recently begun to acquiesce in people organizing anti-Japanese activities, rather than suppressing these people in the name of social stability. The Associated Press reporter described Tong Zeng as a leader among China's passionate and well-organized anti-Japan activists. Insists China must veto Security Council membership for Japan. "How can a nation that has never apologized for its barbaric behavior gain the trust of the international community to be a Security Council member?" Tong said. "A country like this in the Security Council would be a huge threat to world peace." The German weekly Der Spiegel reported Tong Zeng's opinion, saying that the government should "listen more to public opinion." More than 10 years later, a graduation thesis by Naval Postgraduate School in the United States specifically cited some of the viewpoints of political activist Tong Zeng during this period.

Anti-Japanese demonstrations in various parts of China in April 2005 showed some excessive violence. Reuters claimed that Tong Zeng was the main organizer of anti-Japanese protests in 2005. Time magazine, The Sydney Morning Herald and other media also mentioned Tong Zeng, showing that Tong did not encourage any radical behavior. The Baltimore Sun claimed that Tong said it was necessary to take measures against excessive behavior. The media generally believed that the Chinese government had struggled to control anti-Japanese demonstrations. The Helsingin Sanomat (Finland) report also talked about Tong Zeng's views. Of course, there were some comments saying that the Chinese government gave Tong the green light for the anti-Japanese protests, and so on.

Tong Zeng many times participated in the anti-Japanese demonstrations in August 2012, but expressed regret for the violence that occurred during the demonstrations. In an interview with a Reuters reporter, Tong expressed regret for the extreme behaviors that occurred. Tong also hopes that the government will understand public opinion and adjust its policies accordingly. On September 17, 2012, Tong Zeng, together with 28 Chinese civil opinion leaders such as Ren Zhiqiang and Li Kaifu, condemned the violence in the Anti Japanese march through microblog. A paper by MIT Center for International Studies stated that there was no relationship between the nationalist actions led by Mr. Tong Zeng and the irrational acts such as violence in the demonstrations.

When Tong Zeng was interviewed by the Associated Press in April 2005 about the believers in the Vatican and China, he said that faith can break through the political framework. In October 2019, The New York Times interviewed Tong Zeng about the upcoming NBA game in China. He hoped that the audience would not use verbal violence and abuse when watching the game.

== Opposition to the Human Genome Project ==
=== "Blood sampling event" for genetical research in the 1990s ===
The Human Genome Project was instituted by the United States's National Institutes of Health in the 1990s. The genetic blood sampling project of "Model and Analysis of Mortality of the Elderly" was implemented in Association of Aging where Tong Zeng was an employee. Tong objected to the collection of blood samples from the elderly, he blocked a blood collection project that cooperated between Chinese and American institutions to study the genetic genes responsible for the death of the elderly, and he was subsequently expelled from the association. The Association of Aging subsequently sued three Chinese media companies that supported Tong Zeng. The lawsuits were unsuccessful. Meanwhile, In 1998, Ms. Xiong Lei, a Chinese journalist who interviewed and reported on Tong Zeng, also investigated other projects to collect Chinese genetic genes, and for this reason, published reports in multiple media that shared the views of Tong Zeng. However, Chinese officials differ from Tong Zeng and Xiong Lei in their views and attitudes. They believe that there is no problem with Sino American institutional cooperation projects. John Pomfret (journalist) of the Washington Post, wrote a long story about this.

=== The last line of defense ===
In October 2003 Tong Zeng published the book The Last Line of Defense in which he alleged that the 2002–2004 SARS outbreak was artificially manufactured in a laboratory and was a genetic weapon used against the Chinese people. Tong Zeng's book immediately sparked discussion in many Internet forums and chat rooms in China. His views were also rejected by Chinese health experts and scientists including Zhong Nanshan and Yang Huanming. The Nanjing CDC, China's official agency, was also interviewed to oppose Tong Zeng's view. In February, 2004, the New Republic, an American liberal weekly, also said Tong Zeng's book published in 2003 puts forward a conspiracy theory. A doctoral thesis by Nicolaus Copernicus University in Torun, Poland also expressed another view that the China Publishing House agreed to publish this book on Tong Zeng, which also indicates a certain degree of need for the Chinese government.

The medical position of the World Health Organization (WHO) is that SARS was transmitted to humans from the animal kingdom. SARS was effectively "controlled" without an outbreak. In May 2005, the WHO announced that SARS had been eradicated. However, shortly after the publication of Tong Zeng's book, The Lancet published an article with a similar perspective to that of Tong Zeng, "SARS coronavirus has the potential to be employed as a weapon targeted at military units."

=== Propagation of medical conspiracy theories ===
On October 15, 2003, Fang Zhouzi, a Chinese scholar with medical education background described Tong Zeng's claims about SARS as a conspiracy theory, criticizing multiple problems with the book. A few days later, he published another article on Tong, further criticizing his theory.

When the coronavirus emerged in Wuhan, China, the Beijing News, the official Chinese media, published a social review called "Don't Let Conspiracy Theories Make Waves", criticizing Tong Zeng's book published 17 years ago. As soon as some self-media published the view of Tong Zeng that SARS is a genetic weapon and came from a laboratory, it is immediately regarded as a rumor. The views of Tong's book have also been reported as one of the five conspiracy theories. The WHO and multiple other health organizations determined that the new coronavirus did not come from a laboratory, but also believed that it might come from animal nature.

Tong Zeng's views are often spread by media outside of China. His book was listed in the reference of the article published by the United States National Library of Medicine.

=== Thorough inspection of biological, viral and genetic laboratories ===
February 2013 coincided with the tenth anniversary of the outbreak of SARS. Tong Zeng visited some SARS survivors in Beijing. Canadian groups also paid attention to SARS survivors and medical personnel in 2003.

After the start of the COVID-19 pandemic Tong Zeng became a major supporter of the COVID-19 lab-leak theory. And Tong Zeng has supported figures promoting that idea the theory.

On September 3, 2020, Tong Zeng shared online publicly that he felt guilty about doing too little. He expressed his sorrow over those who lost their relatives to the COVID-19 pandemic, extending a personal apology dedicated to these individuals. To find the source of COVID-19, Tong Zeng initiated a signature on a website in mid-March 2020. In the petition, Tong Zeng demanded that the United Nations agency thoroughly inspect the biological, viral, and genetic laboratories of the council's five permanent members.

== Death ==
Tong died on October 23, 2025, at the age of 69.
