= Treaty of Taipei =

1952 peace treaty between Japan and the Republic of China

Treaty of Peace between the Republic of China and Japan
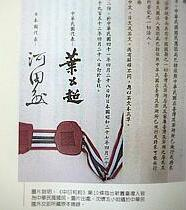
- Type: Peace treaty
- Signed: 28 April 1952
- Location: Taipei, Republic of China
- Effective: 5 August 1952
- Parties: Republic of China; Japan
- Language: Classical Chinese

The Sino-Japanese Peace Treaty (Chinese: 中日和平條約; Japanese: 日華平和条約), formally the Treaty of Peace between the Republic of China and Japan (Chinese: 中華民國與日本國間和平條約; Japanese: 日本国と中華民国との間の平和条約) and commonly known as the Treaty of Taipei (Chinese: 臺北和約), was a peace treaty between Japan and the Republic of China (ROC) signed in Taipei, Taiwan on 28 April 1952, and took effect on August 5 the same year, marking the formal end of the Second Sino-Japanese War (1937–1945).

Neither the Republic of China nor the People's Republic of China was invited to sign the San Francisco Peace Treaty due to disagreements by other countries as to which government was the legitimate government of China during and after the Chinese Civil War. Under pressure from the United States, Japan signed a separate peace treaty with the Republic of China to bring the war between the two states to a formal end with a victory for the ROC. Although the ROC itself was not a participant in the San Francisco Peace Conference due to the resumption of the Chinese Civil War after 1945, this treaty largely corresponds to that of San Francisco in respect to the issue of Taiwan. In 1972, Japan unilaterally terminated this treaty after it established diplomatic relations with the PRC government.

== Key articles of the treaty ==
Article 2

It is recognized that under Article 2 of the Treaty of Peace with Japan signed at the city of San Francisco in the United States of America on September 8, 1951 (hereinafter referred to as the San Francisco Treaty), Japan has renounced all right, title and claim to Taiwan (Formosa) and Penghu (the Pescadores) as well as the Spratly Islands and the Paracel Islands.

Article 3

The disposition of property of Japan and of its nationals in Taiwan (Formosa) and Penghu (the Pescadores), and their claims, including debts, against the authorities of the Republic of China in Taiwan (Formosa) and Penghu (the Pescadores) and the residents thereof, and the disposition in Japan of property of such authorities and residents and their claims, including debts, against Japan and its nationals, shall be the subject of special arrangements between the Government of the Republic of China and the Government of Japan. The terms nationals and residents whenever used in the present Treaty include juridical persons.

Article 4

It is recognized that all treaties, conventions and agreements concluded before December 9, 1941, between China and Japan have become null and void as a consequence of the war.

Article 9

The Republic of China and Japan will endeavor to conclude, as soon as possible, an agreement providing for the regulation or limitation of fishing and the conservation and development of fisheries on the high seas.

Article 10

For the purposes of the present Treaty, nationals of the Republic of China, shall be deemed to include all the inhabitants and former inhabitants of Taiwan (Formosa) and Penghu (the Pescadores) and their descendents who are of the Chinese nationality in accordance with the laws and regulations which have been or may hereafter be enforced by the Republic of China in Taiwan (Formosa) and Penghu (the Pescadores); and juridical persons of the Republic of China shall be deemed to include all those registered under the laws and regulations which have been or may hereafter be enforced by the Republic of China in Taiwan (Formosa) and Penghu (the Pescadores).

== Relationship with the San Francisco Peace Treaty ==
=== Direct references ===
In Articles 2 and 5, the Treaty of Taipei makes direct references to the San Francisco Peace Treaty (SFPT), also known as the Japanese Peace Treaty, which was signed and ratified by most Allies with the government of Japan respectively in 1951 and 1952. In Article 2, Japan confirms the terms of the SFPT, in which it renounced all right, title, and claim concerning the island of Taiwan, the Pescadores, the Spratly Islands, and the Paracel Islands. In Protocol 1b of the Treaty of Taipei, the ROC waived the benefit of Article 14a1 of the SFPT, namely the services of the Japanese people in production, salvaging and other work for repairing the damage done during the war. In Protocol 1c, Articles 11 and 18 of the SFPT were excluded from the operation of Article 11 of the Treaty of Taipei.

=== Dates ===
The San Francisco Peace Treaty was signed on 8 September 1951 and ratified on 28 April 1952, the same date that the Treaty of Taipei was signed. The latter treaty entered into force on 5 August 1952 with the exchange of the instruments of ratification between Tokyo and Taipei. British officials did not consider Taiwan's sovereignty to be transferred to China by the SFPT; American officials recognized no such transfer in either treaty. (Note: "Under the Japanese Peace Treaty Japan has renounced all sovereignty and title to Formosa, but the question of sovereignty remains in abeyance." -- Sir Anthony Nutting, British Minister of State) (Note: "In neither [the Japanese Peace Treaty of 1951 nor the Treaty of Peace between the Republic of China and Japan of 1952] did Japan cede this area [of Formosa and the Pescadores] to any particular entity. As Taiwan and the Pescadores are not covered by any existing international disposition, sovereignty over the area is an unsettled question subject to future international resolution. Both the Republic of China and the Chinese Communists disagree with this conclusion and consider that Taiwan and the Pescadores are part of the sovereign state of China. The United States recognizes the Government of the Republic of China as legitimately occupying and exercising jurisdiction over Taiwan and the Pescadores.")

== Political status of Taiwan with respect to the ROC ==
Article 10 of the Treaty states that "for the purposes of the present Treaty, nationals of the Republic of China shall be deemed to include all the inhabitants and former inhabitants of Taiwan (Formosa) and Penghu (the Pescadores) and their descendants who are of the Chinese nationality in accordance with the laws and regulations which have been or may hereafter be enforced by the Republic of China in Taiwan (Formosa) and Penghu (the Pescadores)."

Ng Chiautong, chairman of the organization World United Formosans for Independence (WUFI), argued that Article 10 is not an affirmative definition of the Chinese nationality of the Taiwanese people but merely an agreement for the sake of convenience on the treatment of the Taiwanese as ROC nationals, because otherwise the inhabitants of Taiwan who were formerly Japanese nationals would not be able to travel to Japan. He also argues that the Treaty of Taipei does not call the Taiwanese "Chinese nationals" but prefers the term "residents".

Independence supporters claim that the Nationality Law of the Republic of China was originally promulgated in February 1929, when Taiwan was argued to be a de jure part of Japan. The Nationality Law was revised in February 2000; however, there were no articles addressing the mass naturalization of Taiwanese persons as ROC citizens. They also point out that neither the San Francisco Treaty nor the Treaty of Taipei specifically provide for a transfer of sovereignty of Taiwan from Japan to China. Both have provisions for the renunciation of Japan's claims of sovereignty, yet neither provides for a mechanism of transfer to China.

As the ROC officially announced the abrogation of the Treaty of Shimonoseki on more than one occasion, supporters of the ROC argue that China's sovereignty over Taiwan was never in dispute. Moreover, Japan and the ROC by the Treaty of Taipei further "recognised that all treaties, conventions and agreements concluded before December 9, 1941, between Japan and China have become null and void as a consequence of the war". It was therefore argued that the ROC Nationality Law which was promulgated in February 1929 would have applied to the residents on Taiwan, and it was unnecessary to address any nationality issues in the February 2000 revision.

On the other hand, Chen Lung-chu and W. M. Reisman, writing in the Yale Law Journal in 1972, argued that the title to Taiwan territory vested in Japan at the time of, and/or because of, the Treaty of Shimonoseki, as the language of the Treaty clearly indicated. Such title, insofar as it is title, ceases to be a bilateral contractual relationship and becomes a real relationship in international law. Though contract may be a modality for transferring title, title is not a contractual relationship. Hence once it vests, it can no longer be susceptible to denunciation by a party to the treaty. Y. Frank Chiang, writing in the Fordham International Law Journal in 2004, expanded upon this argument and claimed that there are no international law principles which can serve to validate a unilateral proclamation to abrogate (or revoke) a territorial treaty, whether based on a charge of being "unequal," or due to a subsequent "aggression" of the other party to the treaty, or any other reason.

According to United Nations Treaty Series Volume 138, the Japanese plenipotentiary, Isao Kawada, acknowledged "The present Treaty (Treaty of Peace) shall, in respect of the Republic of China, be applicable to all the territories which are now, or which may hereafter be, under the control of its Government," which included Taiwan (Formosa), Penghu (the Pescadores) through the Exchange of Notes No. 1. Regarding the effect of the Exchange of Notes No. 1, in 1964, Japanese Minister for Foreign Affairs Masayoshi Ōhira explained in the House of Councillors: "This note of exchange has nothing to do with the Republic of China's territorial sovereignty... The effect of this provision is under the prerequisite of the Republic of China's actual administration over these territories and clearly does not mean its Government has the territorial sovereignty over these territories. We used the word "control" to make such a connotation obvious."

== Later Japanese perspectives ==
On Aug. 12, 1978, Japan and the People's Republic of China (PRC) signed a formal treaty of diplomatic relation, the Treaty of Peace and Friendship between Japan and China, at Beijing. In 1980, while adjudicating a case concerning nationality, the Tokyo High Court wrote in its opinion that the treaty should lose its significance and should end as a result of the joint Communiqué.

Japanese lawyers have also argued that the Treaty of Taipei, Japan–China Joint Communiqué in 1972, and the subsequent treaty between Japan and China waived the rights of Chinese nationals to seek war compensation from the Japanese government or corporations based in Japan. Nearly all such lawsuits have failed, despite support for the victims from some quarters of the Japanese society. Meanwhile, Beijing stated in 1995 that the joint communiqué waived reparations claims from the Chinese government only, but not from private citizens. It may face increased pressure to back private reparations demands as a stand against perceived Japanese nationalism, historical revisionism, and challenge of Chinese sovereignty over Taiwan.

== See also ==
- Treaty of Peace and Friendship between Japan and China
- Second Sino-Japanese War (1937–45)
- Sino-Japanese relations
- Political status of Taiwan
- Treaty of San Francisco
- Japan–Taiwan relations

== Footnotes and references ==
Footnotes
