= Deem (law) =

Deem in law means to consider, judge, or condemn. It is also used to treat something as if it were something else or has qualities that it does not have.

"Deem" has been traditionally considered to be useful when it is necessary to establish a legal fiction either positively by "deeming" something to be what it is not, or negatively by "deeming" something not to be what it is. According to Black's Law Dictionary, all other uses of the word should be avoided. In phrases such as “if he deems fit”, “as he deems necessary”, or “nothing in this Act shall be deemed to...”, "thinks" or "considers" are preferable in the first two examples, and "construed" or "interpreted" are preferable in the third example.

Although using "deem" to mean "to treat as" can be counter-factual, it is not necessarily so. When acts are "deemed" by statute to be a crime of a certain nature, they are such crime, not merely a semblance, approximation, or designation of the offense.

== Origin ==
"Deem" is derived from "domas" in Old English meaning judgment or law, as in the 7th century Law of Æthelberht. "Domas" is also the origin of words such as "kingdom" and "doomsday". In contrast, the word "law" descends from the Old Norse word "lagu", while "legislate" has its roots in the Latin words "lex" and "latio", meaning law and bringing respectively.

== Examples ==
In Article 10 of the Treaty of Taipei, the inhabitants of Taiwan and Penghu are deemed to be nationals of the Republic of China. On 27 May 1952, Wajima Eiji, who was the head of the Asian Affairs Bureau of Japan and one of the participants of the negotiation of the drafting of the treaty, explained in the House of Councillors of Japan that, the purpose of Article 10 is to facilitate the inhabitants' traveling to other countries. Wajima further explained that because the future ownership of the territorial sovereignty over Taiwan and Penghu are unclear, the inhabitants' nationalities would become unclear once they lose Japanese nationalities due to the two territories being renounced by Japan, causing their inconveniences when they are traveling to other countries. Therefore, according to Wajima, the Article makes the inhabitants of Taiwan and Penghu deemed to be nationals of the Republic of China and the purpose of the Article is not to define who the nationals of the Republic of China are.

In the California Corporations Code, "deem" is used in several ways.

In Section 1313: A conversion pursuant to Chapter 11.5 (commencing with Section 1150) shall be deemed to constitute a reorganization for purposes of applying the provisions of this chapter, in accordance with and to the extent provided in Section 1159.

In Section 1702(a): Service in this manner is deemed complete on the 10th day after delivery of the process to the Secretary of State.

In Section 1806: The making of orders for the bringing in of new parties as the court deems proper for the determination of all questions and matters.

In the first example, "deem" is used counterfactually to treat conversion as reorganization. In the second example, "deem" is used to mean "to treat as" without implying whether something is factual or not. In the third example, "deem" is used to mean "determine" or "judge".

== See also ==
- De jure
- De facto
