= Liu Lianren =

Wartime slave in WWII (b. 1913, d. 2000)

Liu Lianren (simplified Chinese: 刘连仁; traditional Chinese: 劉連仁; 1913 – September 2, 2000) was a Chinese war slave in Japan during World War II.

Born in Gaomi, Shandong, Republic of China, Liu was sent to Japan to work as a slave labourer after the Japanese invasion of China. In July 1945, Liu escaped from a Hokkaido coal mine (Meiji Mining Company) and lived in the mountains for 13 years before being found by locals in February 1958. He realized the war was over and requested to be returned to China.

In March 1996 Liu and his family sued the Japanese government for compensation as the Meiji Mining Company no longer existed. In a 2001 ruling, the Tokyo District Court upheld his suit in the first instance and ordered the Japanese government to compensate him for approximately US$160,000.

The Japanese government filed an appeal which overturned the previous ruling, citing there is no provision for compensation under international and pre-war Japanese law. The Japanese government claimed that Liu had no proof of forced transport or forced labor.
