= Treaty of Peace and Friendship between Japan and China =

1978 peace treaty

Treaty of Peace and Friendship between Japan and the People's Republic of China
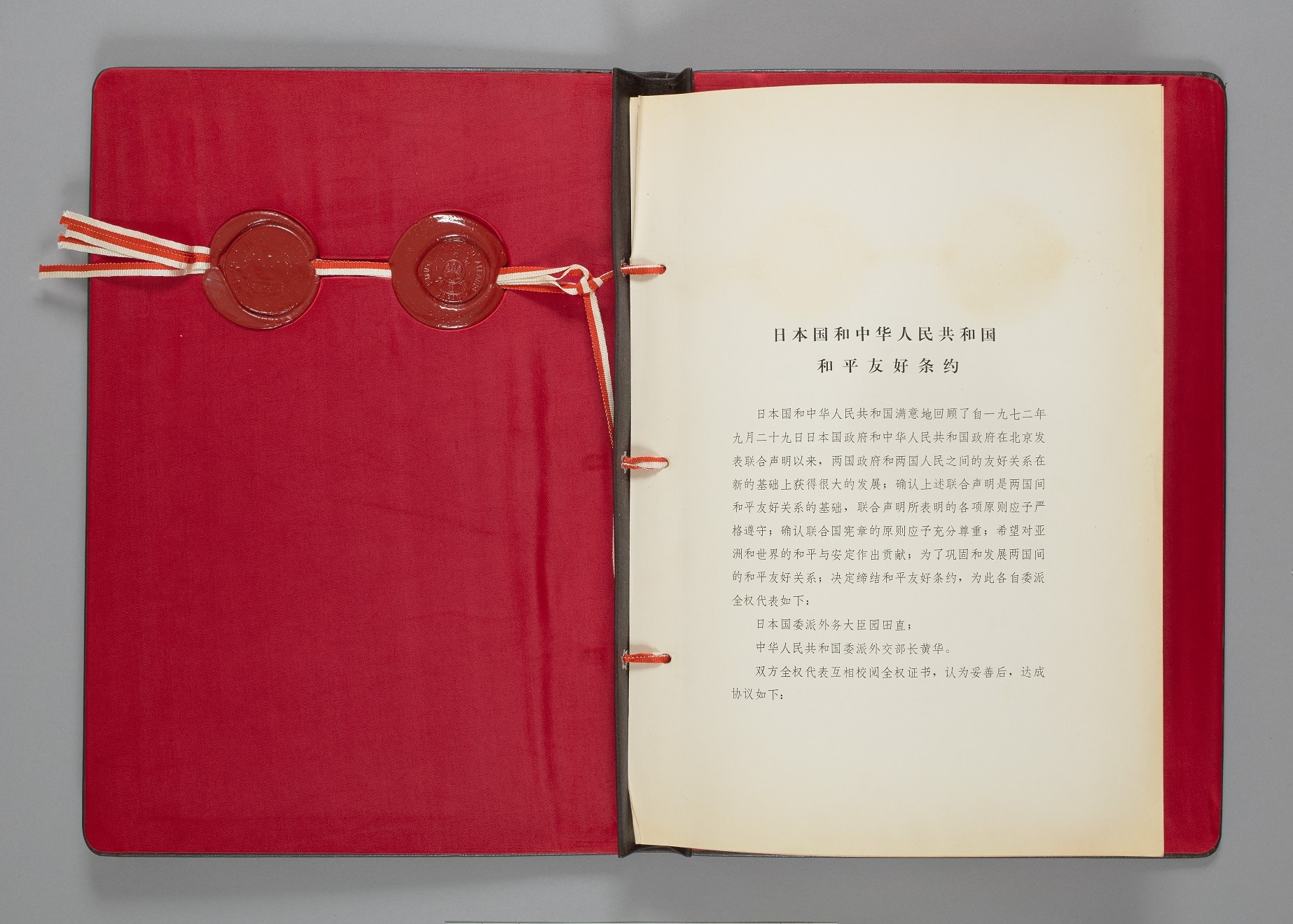
- Signed: 12 August 1978
- Effective: 23 October 1978
- Signatories: China; Japan
- Languages: Chinese; Japanese

Full text
- Treaty of Peace and Friendship between Japan and the People's Republic of China at Wikisource

The Treaty of Peace and Friendship between Japan and the People's Republic of China (Note: The treaty is commonly known in Japanese by its abbreviated name, Nitchū Heiwa Yūkō Jōyaku (日中平和友好条約).) (Japanese: 日本国と中華人民共和国との間の平和友好条約, Hepburn: Nihonkoku to Chūka Jinmin Kyōwakoku to no aida no Heiwa Yūkō Jōyaku; Chinese: 中华人民共和国和日本国和平友好条约; pinyin: Zhōnghuá Rénmín Gònghéguó hé Rìběnguó hépíng yǒuhǎo tiáoyuē) is a peace treaty concluded between the People's Republic of China and Japan on August 12, 1978. The treaty was signed in Beijing by Huang Hua (1913 – 2010), Foreign Minister of the People's Republic of China, and Sunao Sonoda (1913 – 1984), Minister for Foreign Affairs of Japan. The treaty went into effect on October 23, 1978, with the state visit of Vice Premier of the PRC Deng Xiaoping (1904 – 1997) to Japan. The treaty had its origin in the Joint Communiqué of the Government of Japan and the Government of the People's Republic of China of 1972. Negotiations on a formal peace treaty began in 1974, but were drawn out over various disputes until 1978. The treaty ultimately consisted of five articles, and was strongly opposed by the Soviet Union.

== See also ==
- Joint Communiqué of the Government of Japan and the Government of the People's Republic of China
- China–Japan relations
- Japan China Trade Agreement 1974
