= Japan–China Joint Communiqué =

1972 treaty between Japan and China

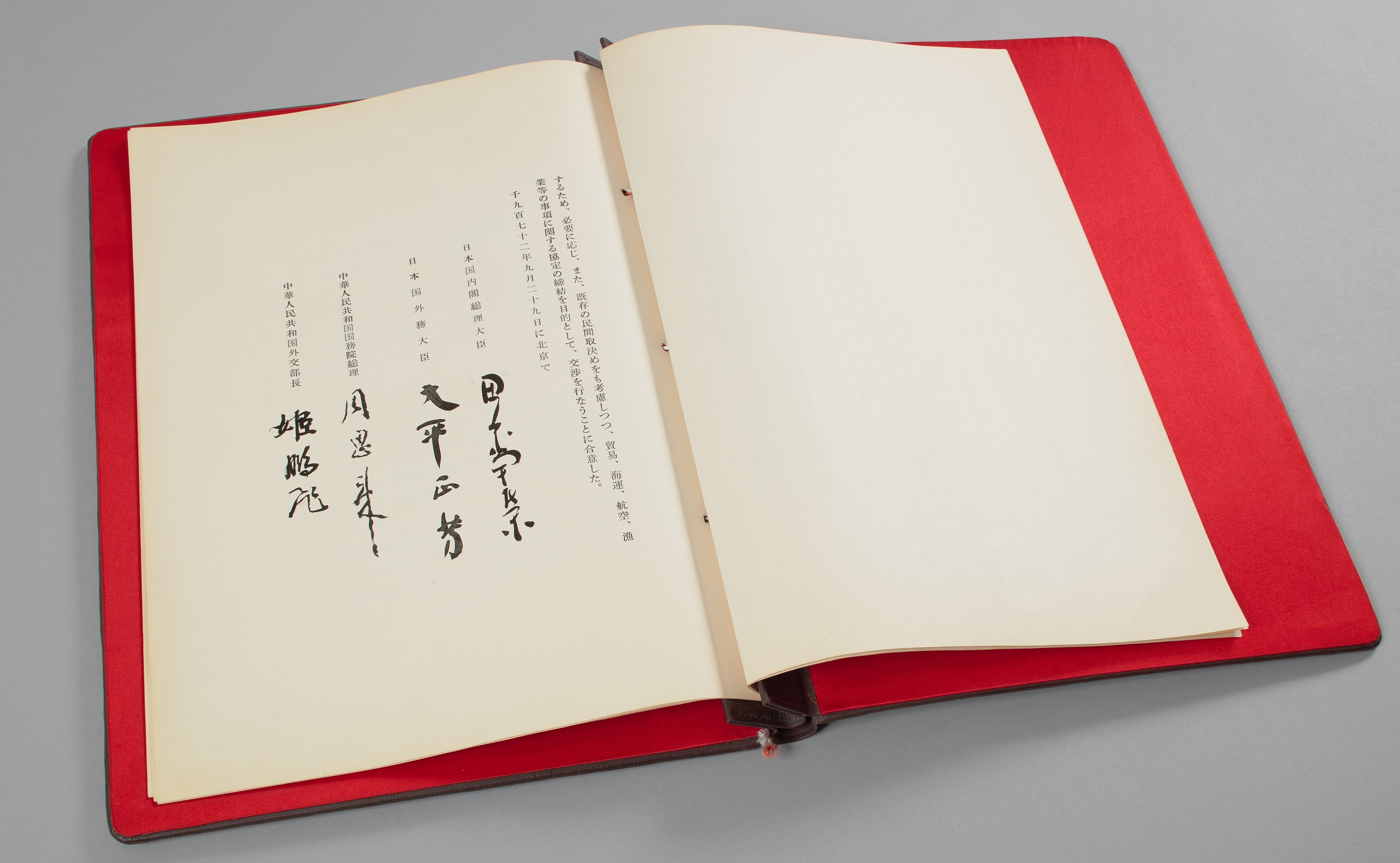

Chinese name
- Traditional Chinese: 中華人民共和國政府與日本政府的聯合聲明
- Simplified Chinese: 中华人民共和国政府与日本政府的联合声明
Transcriptions
Standard Mandarin
- Hanyu Pinyin: Zhōnghuá Rénmín Gònghéguó Zhèngfǔ yǔ Rìběn Zhèngfǔ de Liánhé Shēngmíng
Yue: Cantonese
- Jyutping: zong1 waa4 jan4 men4 gong6 wo4 gwok3 zing3 fu2 jyu3 jat6 bun2 zing3 fu2 dik1 lyun4 hap6 sing1 ming4

Japanese name
- Kanji: 日本国政府と中華人民共和国政府の共同声明
- Kana: にほんこくせいふと ちゅうかじんみんきょうわこくせいふの きょうどうせいめい
Transcriptions
- Romanization: Nippon-koku Seifu to Chūkajinmin-kyōwakoku Seifu no Kyōdō Seimei

Joint Communiqué of PRC and Japan

The Joint Communique of the Government of Japan and the Government of the People's Republic of China was signed on 29 September 1972 in Beijing. The communique established and normalized diplomatic relations between Japan and the People's Republic of China (PRC), resulted in the severing of official relations between Japan and the Republic of China (ROC) in Taiwan. The document produced nine articles in a joint statement, showing compromises on previously ambiguous principles enunciated by both sides. Of these, four points are particularly worthy of attention:

1. the desire for a peace treaty between Japan and China;
2. the statement that Japan "understands and respects [China's] stance" that Taiwan is part of the PRC;
3. an Asia-Pacific anti-hegemony clause;
4. Japan's reversal of relations with China and Taiwan.

The document ended the "abnormal relations between Japan and China", recognized the People's Republic of China as the "sole government of China", and renounced any claim for war reparations from World War II. In addition, it concluded various administrative agreements between the two countries in trade, fisheries, aviation, and navigation, amongst others. The document firmly maintains its stance under Article 8 of the Potsdam Declaration.

== Before the communique ==
=== Japan's relations with ROC ===
Taiwan was under Japanese rule from 1895 to 1945, which was relinquished thereafter to the Republic of China following Japan's defeat in World War II. After the Republic of China's retreat to Taiwan, the Japanese government during the Yoshida Cabinet lost hope of establishing substantial relations with the Chinese Communist Party in Beijing, instead considering the prospect of signing a peace treaty and establishing diplomatic normalization with the new Republic of China, which had by now lost the Chinese Civil War and retreated to Taipei, Taiwan. Japan at the time also carried the debt of gratitude to Nationalist China, as Chiang Kai-shek made the announcement of "returning virtue for malice" (uramini mukuiruni tokuwo motte suru) and repatriated all the Japanese troops. As a result, on 25 April 1952, according to the Yoshida Letter, "the Japanese government has no intention to conclude a bilateral treaty with the Communist regime in China", and later the Treaty of Taipei was signed. It was signed as Japan was under pressure by the United States to not recognize the newly established People's Republic of China due to their role in the Korean War, instead recognizing the government of ROC led by Chiang Kai-shek as the legitimate government of China with this treaty.

=== Japan's relations with PRC ===
Before normalization from 1952 to 1972, Japan only had diplomatic relations with Taiwan and not China. Although Prime Minister Eisaku Satō was in support of Taiwan, he regarded China as a threat, in keeping with the United States' policy on China.

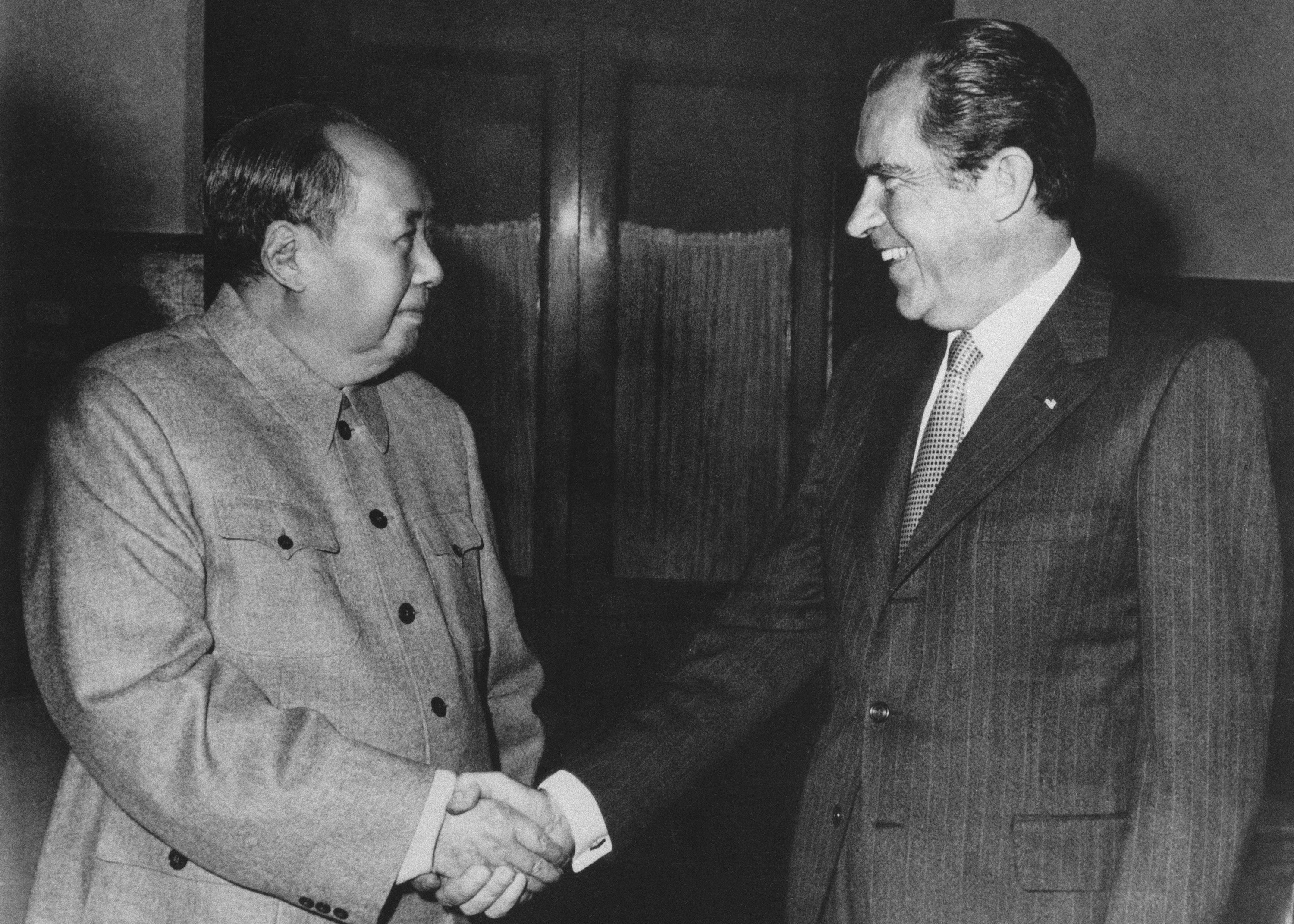
Chinese Communist Party Chairman Mao Zedong receives US President Richard Nixon (right), February 21, 1972

Despite this, Japan was interested in restoring relations with China due to cultural, security, and economic interests. Japan and China have been neighboring countries for almost two thousand years and share many cultural, historic, and religious heritages. In terms of security interests, Japan wanted to restore its relations with China in order to set the tone for a peaceful diplomatic relationship after years of war.

From 1950 to 1972, trade between Japan and China existed but was relatively limited. At first, trade was restricted due to events such as the Korean War, a Chinese embargo on Japan in 1958, and tensions regarding the recognition of Taiwan. Later, the 1960 "Japan-China Trade Principle" led to the growth in selective trade that became more regularized after diplomatic relations resumed in 1972.

After the economic "Nixon shock" in 1971, Chinese businesses became more attractive for the Japanese economy than they previously had. Eventually, Prime Minister Satō resigned, which led to the election and next cabinet of Prime Minister Kakuei Tanaka. Prime Minister Tanaka made the restoration of relations between Japan and China an issue of priority in his agenda, hence his pursuing of the Joint Communique. This was beneficial for China as well, since it could lead to a smooth entry back into the international society and economy and could end the state of war between China and Japan. The February 1972 visit by Richard Nixon to China, leading to the Shanghai Communiqué, also played a role. The surprising Sino-American rapprochement boosted the possibility of a communique between China and Japan.

=== UN's recognition of PRC ===
1971 witnessed an erosion of Taiwan's international position and a shift in Japan–ROC–PRC relations. Firstly, the Nixon administration removed travel and trading barriers, as well as proposed a more serious dialogue with Beijing due to Cold War politics and the US–Soviet situation. Secondly, in 1971, the United Nations General Assembly voted to admit the PRC into the UN.

From 1945 until 1971, the Republic of China occupied the so-called "China seat" as an original member and one of the five permanent members of the Security Council under the auspices of the US and a moratorium against thenPeople's Republic of China (PRC). However, due to decolonization and the admission of numerous Third World states to the General Assembly, Washington lost its grip on the UN and could no longer sustain the moratorium. Thus, the Chinese representation issue was considered as an "important question" which required a two-thirds vote of the General Assembly for a resolution to pass.

On October 25, 1971, the United Nations General Assembly led by Albania voted to admit the PRC and to expel the ROC. The 17 UN members during the General Assembly declared that the existence of the PRC was "a reality that could not be changed to suit the myth of a so-called Republic of China, fabricated out of a portion of Chinese territory", and that the ROC were "unlawful authorities" that remained there only because of the permanent presence of the US Armed Forces. PRC, therefore, assumed the ROC's place in the General Assembly as well as its place as one of the five permanent members of the UN Security Council.

After the UN General Assembly vote on Peking and Taipei, it was hinted that Japan no longer recognized the Chiang Kai-shek government as the sole legitimate government of China, but only as the government of Taiwan, and that Japan was ready to shift recognition to Peking. In short, Taipei's failure to remain in the UN's Security Council and the General Assembly, along with the Sino-US rapprochement, pushed the Japanese government towards achieving normalization with Peking through establishing the Joint Communique and ultimately severing diplomatic relations with the ROC.

== Terms of communique ==
=== Initial proposals ===
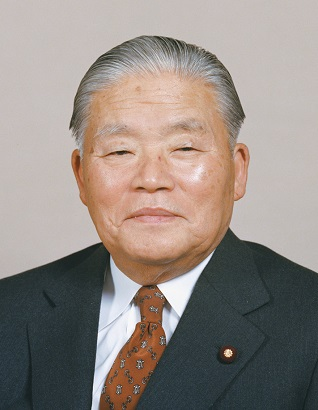
Masayoshi Ōhira, Foreign Minister and later Prime Minister of Japan

==== Japan ====
On 26–27 September 1972, Japan's Foreign Minister Masayoshi Ōhira and China's Foreign Minister Ji Pengfei met to negotiate a proposal for the declaration.

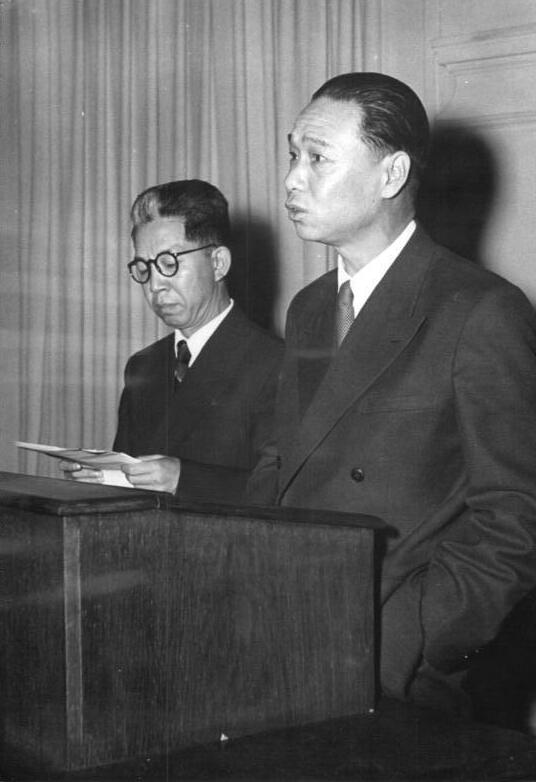
Ji Pengfei (right), former Foreign Minister of China

Japan explained that they should raise the issue of the state of war between China and Japan in Clause 1. Japan explained to China that they could not accept China's interpretation of officially ending the state of war in this joint declaration. This was because China was not bound by the Treaty of Taipei (a peace treaty between Japan and Taiwan), by which Japan and the Republic of China (ROC) government of Chiang Kai-shek had already established the end of World War II. Japan negotiated to emphasize the existence of a peaceful relationship between the two countries and leave the specific timing of the end of the state of war unspecified. Although Japan's standpoint on the Treaty of Taipei did not change, if diplomatic normalization between Japan and China were to be established, Japan was willing to terminate the Treaty of Taipei.

==== PRC ====
In 1971, a Japanese delegation of politicians from the Komeito party visited Beijing and announced in a joint statement with the China–Japan Friendship Association that there were five preconditions for relations between Japan and China:

1. there is only one China, and the government of the People's Republic is the sole legitimate government representing the Chinese people;
2. Taiwan is a province of China and an inalienable part of Chinese territory;
3. the "Japan-Chiang [Peace] Treaty " is illegal and must be abrogated;
4. the United States must withdraw all its armed forces from Taiwan and the Taiwan Straits area;
5. the legitimate rights of the People's Republic in all United Nations organizations must be restored and the representatives of Taiwan expelled.

These principles were approved by Chinese premier Zhou Enlai and did not represent anything new to what China had long been asking of Japan. In fact, these proposals date back to 1953. Dissenting members in the Liberal Democratic Party (LDP), opposition parties, and the left-wing Japan Communist Party (JCP) accepted the first three points without reservation. However, the LDP was hesitant to approve China's proposal, especially since the first two points suggested Japan would have to abolish their peace treaty with Taiwan. Furthermore, in addition, point 4 was beyond Japan's capacity, as they hold no sovereign power over US maritime activity in the region. Lastly, point 5 lost its relevance after China joined the UN in 1971.

=== Negotiations between Japan and PRC ===
==== Outline proposal ====
The outline proposal in which the Foreign Minister of Japan, Masayoshi Ōhira, and Foreign Minister of China, Ji Pengfei, agreed upon for the Japan–China Joint Declaration can be seen as follows:

1. The state of war between Japan and the People's Republic of China ends on the date of the declaration.
2. The Government of Japan fully recognizes the Three Principles for the reestablishment of diplomatic relations between Japan and China that was presented by the Government of the People's Republic of China, and also fully recognizes that the Government of the People's Republic of China is the sole and lawful government of China.
3. Both parties declare that the establishment of diplomatic relations between China and Japan conforms to the long-term wishes of their respective citizens and that it is in line with the benefit of the peoples of the world.
4. Both parties agree to treat relations between China and Japan on the basis of the Five Principles: mutual respect for sovereignty and territorial integrity; mutual nonaggression; mutual noninterference in each other's internal affairs; equality and mutual benefit; and peaceful coexistence. In accordance with the Five Principles, disputes between China and Japan will be resolved through peaceful dialogue and without the use of force or the threat of force.
5. Both parties declare that neither China nor Japan will seek hegemony in the Asia-Pacific region and will oppose any country or group of countries that seek hegemony in this manner.
6. Both parties agree to conclude a treaty of peace and friendship that is based on the Five Principles of Peaceful Coexistence after the establishment of diplomatic relations.
7. For the sake of the friendship between the peoples of China and Japan, the Government of the People's Republic of China abandons its right to demand war reparations from Japan.
8. The Government of the People's Republic of China and the Government of Japan, prior to the conclusion of a peace and friendship treaty, will conclude agreements on commerce, shipping, air traffic, weather, post, fisheries, and science and technology on the basis of need and preexistence in order to promote the human exchange the economic and cultural relations.

==== Draft of joint declaration ====
The governments of Japan and China agreed upon a draft Joint declaration as follows:

- China and Japan are only separated by a sea, and a perpetual and traditionally friendly relationship existed in the history between the two countries. The peoples of both countries long to correct the extremely anomalous state that existed between the two countries. The reestablishment of diplomatic relations between China and Japan will open a new page for the history of relations between the two countries.
- (The Government of Japan is deeply repentant over the damages that Japanese militarism has caused on the people of China in the past. At the same time, the Government of Japan fully recognizes the Three Principles for the Restoration of Relations submitted by the Government of the People's Republic of China. From this standpoint diplomatic normalization between China and Japan will be conducted.)
- The Government of the People's Republic of China welcomes this. Although the social policies of China and Japan differ, the two countries should and can have peaceful and friendly relations. The renewed establishment of diplomatic relations between China and Japan and the development of friendly neighbor relations is not only in line with the fundamental interest of the citizens of both countries, but is also useful for the relaxation of tensions in Asia and for the protection of world peace.
- The Governments of both countries have reached the following agreements through friendly discussion:
1. On the date of the announcement of the joint declaration, the state of war between the People's Republic of China and Japan will end.
2. (The Government of Japan recognizes the Government of the People's Republic of China as the solely lawful government of representing China) The Government of the People's Republic of China once more declares that Taiwan is an indivisible part of the territory of China. (The Government of Japan endorses, based on the Cairo Declaration, the Government of China's standpoint.)
3. The Government of the People's Republic of China and the Government Japan have decided to establish diplomatic relations from September (date) 1972. In line with international law and international custom, both Governments of the respective countries will establish in each other's capitals the embassies and other establishments necessary to carry out their functions. In addition, they agree to exchange ambassadors as quickly as possible.
4. For the sake of friendly relations between the peoples of China and Japan, the Government of the People's Republic of China renounces its claims for war reparations.
5. The Government of Japan and the Government of the People's Republic of China agree to establish a permanent, friendly relationships following the Five Principles of mutual respect for sovereignty and territorial integrity, mutual nonaggression, nonintervention in domestic issues, equality and mutual benefit, and peaceful coexistence.
6. The Government of the People's Republic of China and the Government of Japan declare that both countries shall not seek hegemony in the Asia-Pacific region, and that both countries will oppose any country or group of countries that seek to establish hegemony in this manner.
7. The Government of the People's Republic of China and the Government Japan have agreed to conclude a treaty of peace and friendship in order to develop the peaceful and friendly relations between the peoples of both countries.
8. The Government of the People's Republic of China and the Government of Japan will conclude individual agreements on commerce, shipping, air traffic, fisheries, weather, post, and science and technology on the basis of need and in accordance to preexisting agreements in order to develop the economic and cultural relations between the two countries and to expand the exchange of people.

The sections in parentheses are as appears in the original document.

==== Final agreement ====
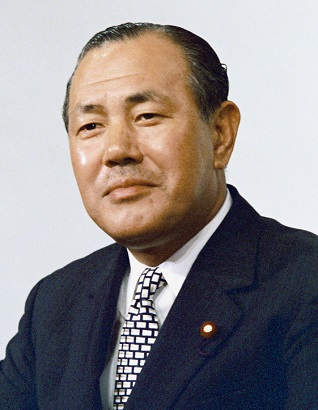
Kakuei Tanaka, former Prime Minister of Japan

From 25 to 30 September 1972, Japanese Prime Minister Kakuei Tanaka visited the PRC at the invitation of Premier of the People's Republic of China Zhou Enlai. Accompanying PM Tanaka were Minister for Foreign Affairs Masayoshi Ōhira, Chief Cabinet Secretary Susumu Nikaido, and other government officials. Chinese Communist Party chairman Mao Zedong met Prime Minister Kakuei Tanaka on 27 September.

PM Tanaka and FM Ōhira had an earnest and frank exchange of views with Premier Zhou Enlai and Chinese Minister for Foreign Affairs Ji Pengfei on the question of normalizing relations between Japan and China, as well as other problems and matters of interest between the two countries. In the end, they agreed to issue the following Joint Communique:

- Japan and China are neighboring countries, separated only by a strip of water with a long history of traditional friendship. The people of the two countries earnestly desire to put an end to the abnormal state of affairs that has hitherto existed between the two countries. The realization of the aspiration of the two peoples for the termination of the state of war and the normalization of relations between Japan and China will add a new page to the annals of relations between the two countries.
- The Japanese side is keenly conscious of the responsibility for the serious damage that Japan caused in the past to the Chinese people through war, and deeply reproaches itself. Further, the Japanese side reaffirms its position that it intends to realize the normalization of relations between the two countries from the stand of fully understanding "the three principles for the restoration of relations" put forward by the Government of the People's Republic of China. The Chinese side expresses its welcome for this.
- In spite of the differences in their social systems existing between the two countries, the two countries should, and can, establish relations of peace and friendship. The normalization of relations and development of good-neighborly and friendly relations between the two countries are in the interests of the two peoples and will contribute to the relaxation of tension in Asia and peace in the world.
1. The abnormal state of affairs that has hitherto existed between Japan and the People's Republic of China is terminated on the date on which this Joint Communique is issued.
2. The Government of Japan recognizes that Government of the People's Republic of China as the sole legal Government of China.
3. The Government of the People's Republic of China reiterates that Taiwan is an inalienable part of the territory of the People's Republic of China. The Government of Japan fully understands and respects this stance of the Government of the People's Republic of China, and it firmly maintains its stand under Article 8 of the Potsdam Proclamation.
4. The Government of Japan and the Government of the People's Republic of China have decided to establish diplomatic relations as from 29 September 1972. The two Governments have decided to take all necessary measures for the establishment and the performance of the functions of each other's embassy in their respective capitals in accordance with international law and practice, and to exchange ambassadors as speedily as possible.
5. The Government of the People's Republic of China declares that, in the interest of the friendship between the Chinese and the Japanese peoples, it renounces its demand for war reparations from Japan.
6. The Government of Japan and the Government of the People's Republic of China agree to establish relations of perpetual peace and friendship between the two countries on the basis of the principles of mutual respect for sovereignty and territorial integrity, mutual non-aggression, non-interference in each other's internal affairs, equality and mutual benefit and peaceful co-existence. The two Governments confirm that, in conformity with the foregoing principles and the principles of the Charter of the United Nations, Japan and China shall in their mutual relations settle all disputes by peaceful means and shall refrain from the use or threat of force.
7. The normalization of relations between Japan and China is not directed against any third country. Neither of the two countries should seek hegemony in the Asia-Pacific region and each is opposed to efforts by any other country or group of countries to establish such hegemony.
8. The Government of Japan and the Government of the People's Republic of China have agreed that, with a view to solidifying and developing the relations of peace and friendship between the two countries, the two Governments will enter into negotiations for the purpose of concluding a treaty of peace and friendship.
9. The Government of Japan and the Government of the People's Republic of China have agreed that, with a view to further promoting relations between the two countries and to expanding interchanges of people, the two Governments will, as necessary and taking account of the existing non-governmental arrangements, enter into negotiations for the purpose of concluding agreements concerning such matters as trade, shipping, aviation, and fisheries.

== Reactions of the public ==
=== Japan ===
A survey conducted by the Japanese Cabinet in 1978 showed that 62.1% of Japanese people who participated in the survey had "friendly feelings toward China" and 25.6% did "not have friendly feelings toward China". These survey results showed that a large proportion of the population had improved feelings toward China after the Joint Communique was agreed upon. This was mainly because of China's withdrawal of any war compensation claims made to the Japanese people in addition to their approval of the United States–Japan Security Treaty. In 1980, the same survey was conducted on the Japanese people, which showed, 78.6% had "friendly feelings toward China" and just 14.7% did "not have friendly feelings toward China".

=== People's Republic of China ===
In the 1990s, criticism and dissatisfaction over the terms of the Joint Communique started to become a topic of discussion between the Chinese people. This was mainly towards the terms agreed upon regarding war reparations and compensation by the Japanese to the Chinese. Chinese people felt that the government had made a decision without consulting with the population first. In response to this, the Chinese government clarified the terms of the Joint Communique. They emphasized that although the Chinese government cannot demand compensation, Chinese citizens as individuals still have the right to demand compensation.

=== Republic of China ===
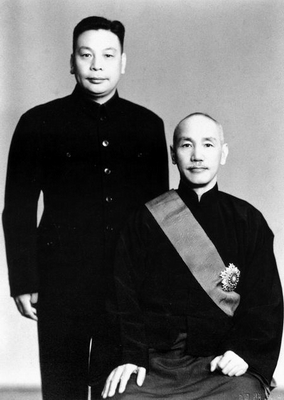
Chiang Kai-shek and his son Chiang Ching-Kuo in 1948

Before the announcement of the communique, there were signs of public anxiety toward expanded US–Sino relations. PM Tanaka's trip to Beijing (25–30 September) was greeted with anger. Taipei delayed the mission of Tanaka's special envoy, Etsusaburo Shiina, so that it coincided with the 41st anniversary of the 18 September Mukden Incident, an infamous episode in the difficult course of Sino–Japanese relations. When Shiina met with new ROC Premier Chiang Ching-kuo and Vice President Yen Chia-kan, he was greeted with rare mass demonstrations. His picture was neither on TV nor in the press, in contrast with the wide coverage of another concurrent visitor, the Mayor of Seoul.

In response to the situation, Chiang Kai-shek's son, Chiang Ching-kuo, in his inaugural speech on 13 June 1972, reassured citizens at a time of national diversity by confirming the stance of Nationalist China (ROC) that there were only "one conflict" (the struggle between the humanitarian rule of the Three Principles of the People and the tyrannical rule of Chinese communists), "one war" (the recovery of the mainland), "one responsibility" (the elimination of the communists), and "one outcome" (the victory of Nationalist China).

== Aftermath ==
=== Japan–PRC relations ===
The normalization of diplomatic relationships between China and Japan was said to have contributed greatly to the prosperity of the Asia-Pacific region and peace. Since normalization, both economic and cultural exchange started to improve. The interactions between the people of China and Japan also improved.

From 1979 onwards, Japan started offering Official Development Assistance (ODA) to China. This was done with numerous projects, such as energy development, infrastructure development, and environmental protection, using low-interest yen loans, grants, and the transfer of technological materials. This ODA helped grow and open up the Chinese economy. Normalization also allowed for Japanese companies to pursue business in the large Chinese market, which benefited the Japanese economy. These efforts led to increased dependency on both sides.

In terms of cultural exchanges, Japanese Sumo wrestlers toured China in April 1973, and in the same month China dispatched 55 members for a goodwill mission in Japan. A Chinese cultural delegation visited Japan in June 1973 to view Chinese art treasures which belonged to the Japanese Imperial Household.

In terms of economic and trade relations, many economic delegations and representatives of banks and firms of both countries subsequently visited each other. Within the first year of normalized relations, 28 Japanese Economic and Trade missions visited China. This included the Yasuhiro Nakasone mission in January 1973 and delegations representing the Promotion of International Trade (Kokubosoku). According to the Ministry of Finance, there was an 83% increase of trade between China and Japan in 1973 compared to the previous year. This can be explained by several reasons. For one, the Tanaka government of Japan made credits available for the Export-Import Bank of China. At the same time, Peking was increasing its efforts to accelerate its five-year economic plan which lasted from 1971 to 1975. It was also suggested that China felt apprehensive about Japan's potential involvement in the Soviet-proposed multi-dimensional development plan in Siberia.

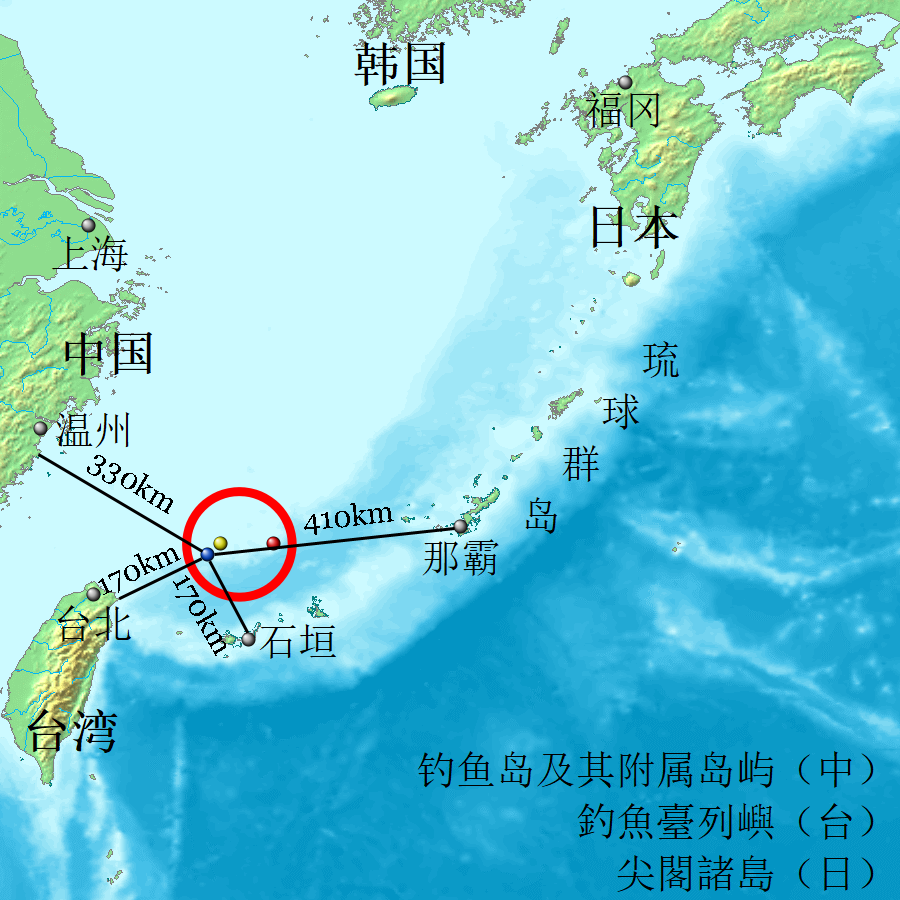
Disputed Senkaku-Diaoyu Islands

Although Japan and China's economic relationship has remained largely stable, other issues have caused friction within their relationship, such as historical problems and the Senkaku-Diaoyu Islands dispute.

=== Japan–ROC relations ===
Had Chiang Kai-shek managed to keep the UN "China seat" by abandoning his "One China policy" more clearly and timely in 1971, PM Tanaka would not have been so keen on normalizing relations with Beijing in 1972 and Taipei would have avoided severing relations with Tokyo.

After Tokyo and Peking normalized relations in 1972, there was a formal disengagement of the Japanese authorities from Taiwan. On 26 December 1972, two private associations were created to supervise bilateral exchanges between Tokyo and Taipei: the Interchange Association on Tokyo's side and the East Asian Relations Association on Taipei's side ("Japan" and "Taiwan" are avoided in the names of both associations). The two associations carried out functions that were normally handled by consular institutions. For example, Taipei's high-ranking civil servants accompanying commercial missions to Japan were introduced as simple experts with ordinary passports. In short, Tokyo–Taipei's relations were relegated to the private sector.

In terms of economic impacts of the communique, despite the deteriorated diplomatic relations with Japan, Taiwan's trade with many countries continued to flourish. However, in 1974, Taiwan had a $1.336 billion trade deficit with Japan. In the following year, the trade deficit with Japan was $1.101 billion, a drop of $235 million compared to 1974 but nearly double Taiwan's overall 1975 deficit of $611 million. Moreover, a strong sense of antagonism intensely arose and harmed Japanese businesses in Taiwan; for example, Japan Airlines soon had to take special precautions against sabotage on every flight to and from Taiwan.

In the 1980s and 1990s, Japanese supporters of Taiwan continued to advocate for the country's independence movement. Pro-Taiwan voices were down in the 1970s but were never totally gone. These supporters acted as check-and-balance mechanisms to prevent the Japanese government from going too far in improving Japan–China relations at the expense of sacrificing Taiwan's interests. After the Tiananmen Massacre in June 1989 temporarily ruptured Sino-Japanese relations, Beijing's intolerance of democratic ideas made democratized Taiwan more favorable in Japanese eyes. Japan-based pro-independence activists promoted Japanese popular awareness of Taiwan as an independent country. Additionally, during this period, the booming of tourism and mainstream media returned to Taiwan.

=== US–China–Japan relations after the communique ===
From 1972 to 1978, some have argued that the Cold War was the golden period of US–China–Japan cooperation; however, always within the context of the US–China security relationship. Sino-US relations constrained their respective policies toward third parties, especially Japan. There were suggestions that Washington might not be pleased with the Joint Communique, which reaffirmed that Sino-Japanese security cooperation could place Japan ahead of the US. Even after the establishment of the communique that represented the normalized Sino-Japanese relations, Japan's China policy was still affected by that of the US, as Japan depended on the US for security. Additionally, Sino-Japanese trade continued to boom, and Peking continued to pressure Japan to sign a peace treaty containing the anti-hegemony language of the 1972 normalization agreement. Overall, during the Carter administration, the triangular US-China-Japan relations continued to prevail. However, under the influence of the US, Peking "lacked the leverage to persuade Japan to adopt a China policy fundamentally different from that of the US".

== See also ==
- China–Japan relations
- Foreign relations of China
- Foreign relations of Japan
- Foreign relations of Taiwan
- Japan-China Joint Declaration of 1998
- Official development assistance (ODA)
- Treaty of Peace and Friendship between Japan and China
- List of war apology statements issued by Japan
