= List of villages in China =

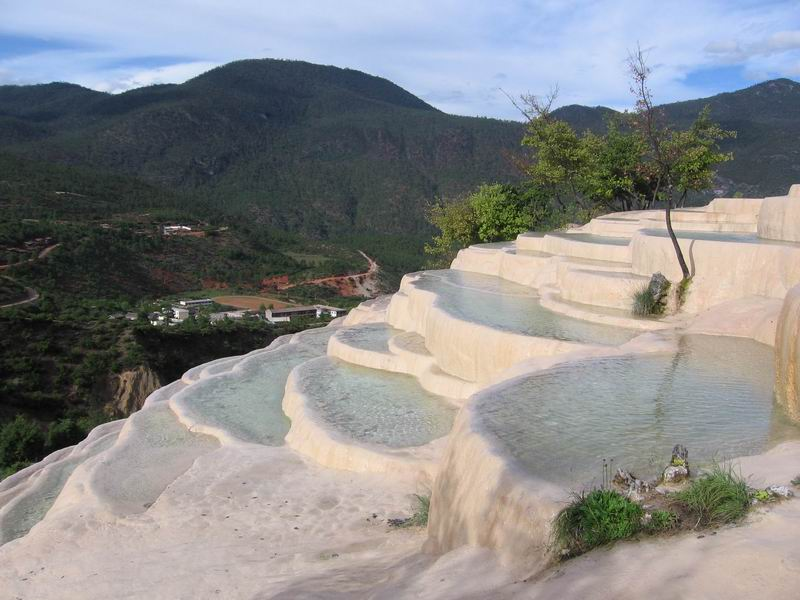
The mineral terraces of Baishuitai

The Great Wall of China at Huanghuacheng

This is a list of villages in China. A village is a clustered human settlement or community, larger than a hamlet but smaller than a town, with a population ranging from a few hundred to a few thousand. In China, an administrative village (Chinese: 村; pinyin: cūn) is a type fifth-level administrative division, underneath a township, county, city, and province. There are more than six hundred thousand administrative villages in China. Some villages are not administrative villages but natural villages, which are not administrative divisions. The below list is divided by province, and ideally lists the name of the village followed by the three higher-administrative divisions (e.g. township, county, and city) to which it belongs administratively.

== Villages in China ==
=== Beijing ===
- Cuandixia, Zhaitang, Mentougou
- Huanghuacheng, Jiuduhe, Huairou

=== Tianjin ===
- Taitou, former village in Gaocun, Wuqing (now a residential community)

=== Hebei Province ===
- Donglü, Donglü, Qingyuan, Baoding
- Shengyou, Dingzhou, Baoding
- Taizicheng, Sitaizui, Chongli, Zhangjiakou

=== Shanxi Province ===
- Daiyang village, Jinchang, Dingxiang, Xinzhou
- Dingcun, Xincheng, Xiangfen, Linfen
- Xinguangwu, Zhangjiazhuang, Shanyin, Shuozhou

=== Inner Mongolia Autonomous Region ===
In addition to villages, a gaqa (嘎查, ᠭᠠᠴᠠᠭ᠎ᠠ) is another type of fifth-level administrative division, found only in Inner Mongolia; the name is derived from the Mongolian language.

- Hanggai, Tiemao, Tumot Left Banner, Hohhot

=== Liaoning Province ===
- Former Pingdingshan (village), Dongzhou, Fushun

=== Jilin Province ===
- Fangchuan, Jingxin, Hunchun, Yanbian

=== Heilongjiang Province ===
- Sanjiazi, Youyi, Fuyu, Qiqihar

=== Jiangsu Province ===
- Huaxi, Jiangyin, Wuxi
- Wangtan, Jieji, Sihong, Suqian
- Zhufan, Shilianghe, Donghai, Lianyungang

=== Zhejiang Province ===
- Fujiang, Tonggong, Changshan, Quzhou
- Huangnitang, Zhoutang, Tianma, Changshan, Quzhou
- Shangjing, Tangxi, Wucheng, Jinhua
- Xinye Village, Daciyan, Jiande, Hangzhou
- Yuanjia'ao, Xiaowangmiao, Fenghua, Ningbo
- Zhuge, Zhuge, Lanxi, Jinhua

=== Anhui Province ===
- Hongcun, Hongcun, Yi, Huangshan
- Xidi, Xidi, Yi, Huangshan
- Xiaogang, Fengyang, Chuzhou

=== Fujian Province ===
- Qiaodou, Huangshi, Licheng, Putian
- Sanji, Chengjiao, Shaowu, Nanping
- Xiaori, Nanri, Xiuyu, Putian

=== Jiangxi Province ===
Likeng Village, Jiangxi, Wuyuan

=== Shandong Province ===
- Nanjusi, Chengguo, Laizhou, Yantai
- Shui Dong, Luohe, Ju County, Rizhao
- Xia Tun, Guozhuang, Ju County, Rizhao
- Zhuangjiashan, Ju, Rizhao
- Zhujiayu, Guanzhuang, Zhangqiu, Jinan

=== Henan Province ===
- Dingzhai, Dongsong, Luoning, Luoyang
- Nanjie, Chengguan, Linying, Luohe
- Shangfeng, Yangce, Biyang, Zhumadian

=== Hunan Province ===
- Changqi, Anjiang, Hongjiang, Huaihua
- Ganzi Village, Hanpu Subdistrict, Yuelu District, Changsha
- Guoliang Village, Tongguan, Wangcheng, Changsha
- Paibi, Paibi, Huayuan, Xiangxi Tujia and Miao Autonomous Prefecture
- Zhangguying Village, Zhangguying, Yueyang, Yueyang

=== Guangdong Province ===
- Boshe, Jiaxi, Lufeng, Shanwei
- Cuiheng, Nanlang, Zhongshan
- Dongzhou, Cheng, Shanwei
- Fengjian, Xingtan, Shunde, Foshan
- Shangba, Xinjiang, Wengyuan, Shaoguan
- Taishi, Dongchong, Nansha, Guangzhou
- Wangtang, Jianggu, Sihui, Zhaoqing
- Wukan, Donghai, Lufeng, Shanwei
- Xiqi, Shuaibu, Taishan, Jiangmen

=== Guangxi Zhuang Autonomous Region ===
- Wangtang, Chaotian, Lingchuan, Guilin

=== Hainan Province ===
Most counties in Hainan are not subordinate to a prefecture-level subdivision (see List of administrative divisions of Hainan), and so some entries below list only the town and county-level divisions to which the village belongs.

- Luokan, Hongmao, Qiongzhong
- Tianweiban, Donglu, Wenchang
- Tree Island, Yongxing Dao, Xisha, Sansha
- Yagong Island, Yongxing Dao, Xisha, Sansha

=== Guizhou Province ===
- Zhongdong, Ziyun, Anshun

=== Yunnan Province ===
- Baishuitai,
- Bamê, Foshan, Dêqên, Dêqên
- Mijiazhuang,
- Zhengying, Baoxiu, Shiping, Honghe

=== Tibet Autonomous Region ===
- Gejizhen

=== Shaanxi Province ===
- Dangjia, Xizhuang, Hancheng, Weinan
- Hongliutan, Zhenchuan, Yuyang, Yulin

=== Gansu Province ===
- Tai'an, Beiwan, Jingyuan, Baiyin
- Zhelaizhai, Yongchang, Jinchang

=== Qinghai Province ===
- Taktser, Shihuiyao, Ping'an, Haidong

=== Unclear ===
- Yanglingang

== See also ==
- Ethnic villages of China
- List of cities in China
- List of cities in China by population
- Outline of China
- Villages of China
