= Wangtang =

Wangtang (旺塘, 汪塘, 网塘) is a name of numerous villages in China. Only a few of them are listed below:

- Wangtang, the name of 3 towns in Anhui prefecture
- Wangtang, Guangdong in Jianggu, Sihui, Zhaoqing, Guangdong
- Wangtang (northwest of Guilin), Guangxi
- Wangtang, Guilin, Guangxi in Chaotian, Lingchuan, Guilin, Guangxi
- Wangtang, Hunan

== See also ==
- Wangtan (disambiguation)
