= Shangfeng =

Shangfeng may refer to the following locations in China:

- Shangfeng, Jiangxi (上奉镇), town in Xiushui County
- Shangfeng, Henan (上冯村), village in Yangce, Biyang County, Zhumadian, Henan
