= Jinshi Archway =

Archway in Guangdong, China

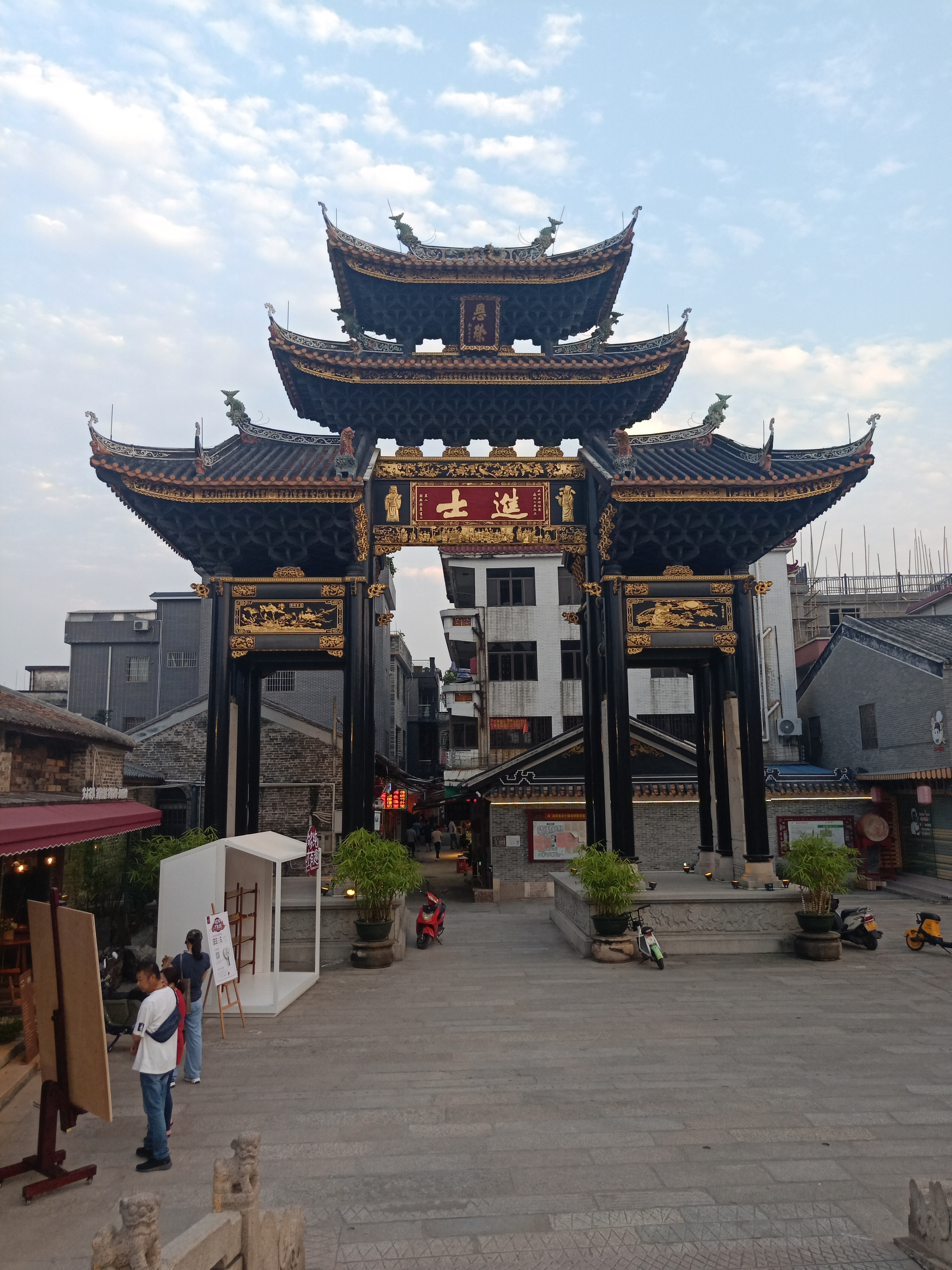
Jinshi Archway in Fengjian Village

The Jinshi archway in Fengjian Village, in Guangdong, China is a three-tier memorial archway. It commemorates the 13 Jinshi scholars from the village. The archway is in the style of the Song dynasty and was one of the four major wooden archways in Guangdong. It is located in front of the Juji bridge (Chinese: 巨济桥). The height is about 16.8 meters. The bottom is supported by 12 concrete columns. It is also called the Enrong Archway (Chinese: 恩荣牌楼). It was originally built in 1533 CE but it was demolished during the Cultural Revolution. It was rebuilt in 2015 and inaugurated on October 1, 2015, at the launching ceremony of the 2015 Shunde Water Village Folk Culture Festival.

== History ==
According to Fengjian village's Song Zhaotao Liang Gong Genealogy (Chinese: 宋招讨梁公族谱), the Jinshi Archway was built in the 11th year of the Jiajing Emperor in the Ming dynasty (1533 CE). The builder was Liang Qiaosheng (Chinese: 梁乔升), a Jinshi in the Xinsi year of Emperor Zhengde (1521 CE) and the head of the Ministry of Households, Criminal Affairs and Works (Chinese: 北京户刑工部主事) in Beijing. Because of his meritorious service in the construction of the palace in Beijing, the emperor granted him the honour of returning home to build the Enrong Archway to honor his virtue.

The Jinshi Archway was known as one of the four major wooden archways in Guangdong. It was a three-layer archway with teak as the main material, brackets and flying eaves. It was demolished during the Cultural Revolution, and only the stone base remained.

== Thirteen Jinshi ==
List of Jinshi in Fengjian Village:

- Li Shixiu (Chinese: 李仕修) (1174–1259) was a Jinshi in the Jiwei year of the Qingyuan period (1199). He served successively as the Fujian Lianfangsi (Chinese: 廉訪司) (head of investigation commissions) and a political participant in the province of Zhejiang. In the last year of Jiading (1224), he resigned and moved from Nanxiong to Fengjian.
- Li Yingzhen (Chinese: 李应珍) (1250–1283) was a Jinshi in the Jiaxu year of Xianchun (1274). He was the deputy envoy of Guangxi Province.
- Liu Yingshen (Chinese: 刘应莘) (1251–1324) became a Jinshi, passing the imperial examination in an unknown year. He served as the governor of Xiongzhou (Chinese: 雄州). He moved to Fengjian due to the incident of concubine Hu's escape from Zhuji Lane (Chinese: 珠玑巷).
- Li Huisun (Chinese: 李惠孙) (1277–1334) was a Jinshi in the Yimao year of Yan (1315). He served successively as the chief clerk of Ruyuan County, Shaozhou, the magistrate of Chongde, Zhejiang, and the assistant of the Suzheng Lianfang Shi (Chinese: 肃政廉访司) (Integrity Visit Department) in Liangjiang, province of Guangxi.
- Liang Guobao (Chinese: 梁国宝) was a Jinshi in the Gengxu year of Hongzhi (1490). He was the governor of Gantan and was promoted to the director of the Ministry of Works with the best performance.
- Liang Guoao (Chinese: 梁国鳌) was a Jinshi in the Gengxu year of Hongzhi (1490) with his brother Guobao. He was the co-magistrate of Guiyang.
- Liang Qiaosheng (Chinese: 梁乔升) was a Jinshi in the Xinsi year of the Zhengde reign (1521). He was appointed as the director of the Ministry of Households, Criminal Affairs and Works in Beijing. Because of his contribution in the construction of the palace in Beijing, he was granted the honorary memorial archway to his hometown to honour his virtue.
- Liang Zhaoyang (Chinese: 梁兆阳) was a Jinshi in the Wuchen year of the Chongzhen reign (1628). He was appointed as a Hanlin Academy Scholar, and was appointed as a Hanlin Academy Reviewer. He was promoted to the position of Zhanshi (Chinese: 詹事) in the Zhanshi Palace (Chinese: 詹事府), and Zuo Chunfang You Zhongyun (Chinese: 左春坊右中允). He was good at seal script, and in the ninth year of the Chongzhen reign (1636), he wrote the seal for the "Monument to the Love of Mr. Ni, of the Former Shunde County".
- Liu Yunhan (Chinese: 刘云汉) was a Jinshi in the Dingchou year of the Kangxi reign (1697). He was good at poetry and calligraphy, and wrote "Beiyoucao" (Chinese: 北游草). Father and son jointly compiled "Qingbaitang Collection"(Chinese: 清白堂集).
- Liu Qi (Chinese: 刘琦) was a military Jinshi in the Jiwei year of the Wanli reign (1619). He successively served as the commander of Yunnan Camp, and was granted additional titles such as the commander of the guard company, the commander of the light chariots, and the general of the imperial guards.
- Liang Shengyu (Chinese: 梁声玉) was a military Jinshi (Chinese: 武进士) in the Yichou year of the Qianlong reign (1745).
- Liang Jinguang (Chinese: 梁觐光) was a military Jinshi in the Jiachen year of the Qianlong reign (1784).
- Liang Luanzao (Chinese: 梁銮藻) was a Jinshi in the Jichou year of the Guangxu reign (1889). He was appointed as a Hanlin Academy Scholar and the Magistrate of Fuzhou.
