= Wangtan =

Wangtan may refer to the following places in China:

- Wangtan, Laoting County (王滩镇), town in Laoting County, Hebei
- Wangtan, Shaoxing County (王坛镇), town in Shaoxing County, Zhejiang
- Wangtan, Jiangsu (王滩村), village in northwestern Jiangsu

== See also ==
- Wangtang (disambiguation)
