= Taitou =

Taitou (台头镇) could refer to four towns in China:

- Taitou, Shouguang, in Shouguang City, Shandong
- Taitou, Xiangning County, in Xiangning County, Shanxi
- Taitou, Gaocun, in Wuqing District, Tianjin
- Taitou, Jinghai County, in Jinghai County, Tianjin

== See also ==
- Taitō: alternate romanization of Taitou in Japanese
