= Changshan County =

Changshan 常山县
- County
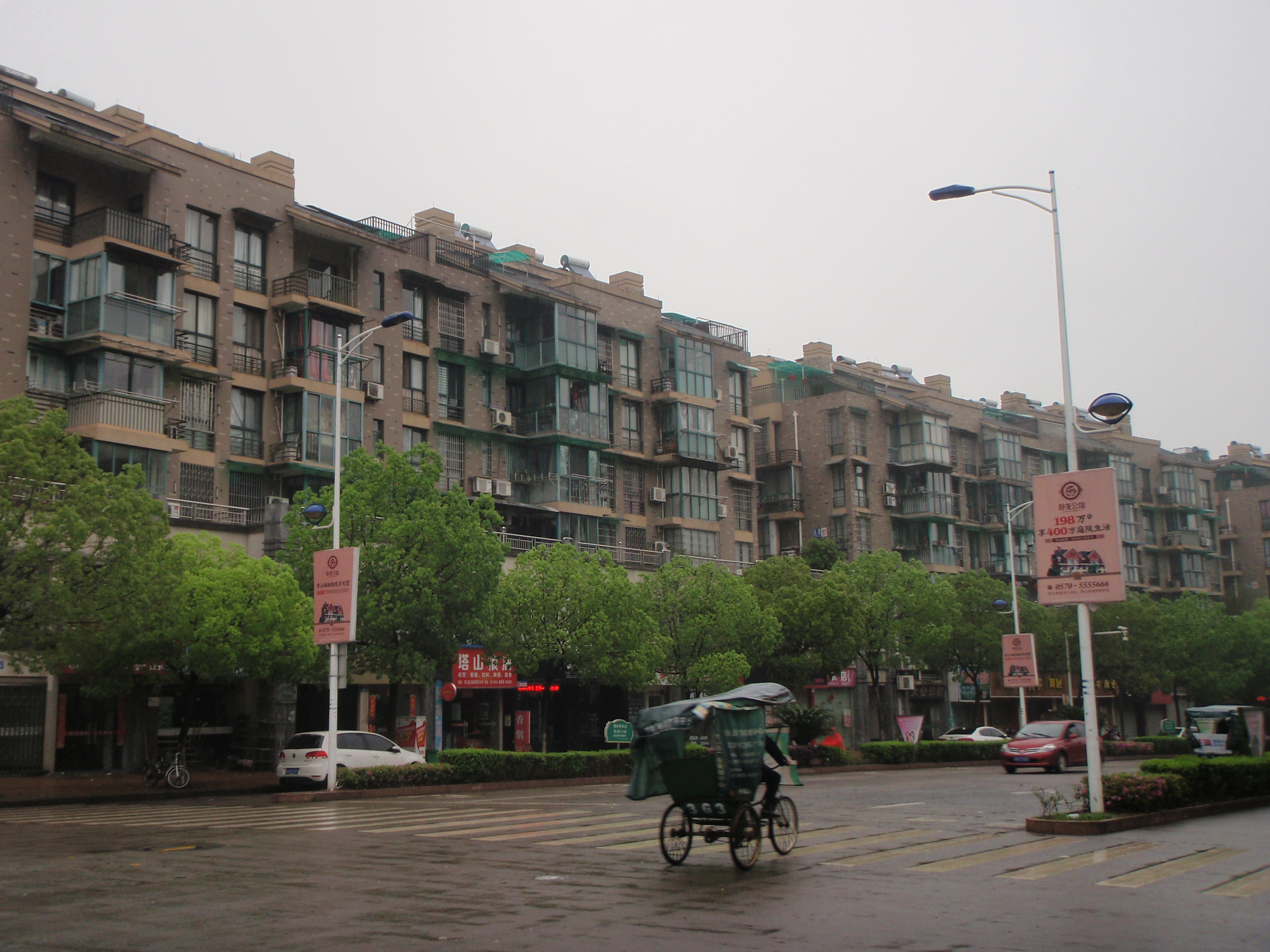
- Renmin Road (人民路) in Changshan

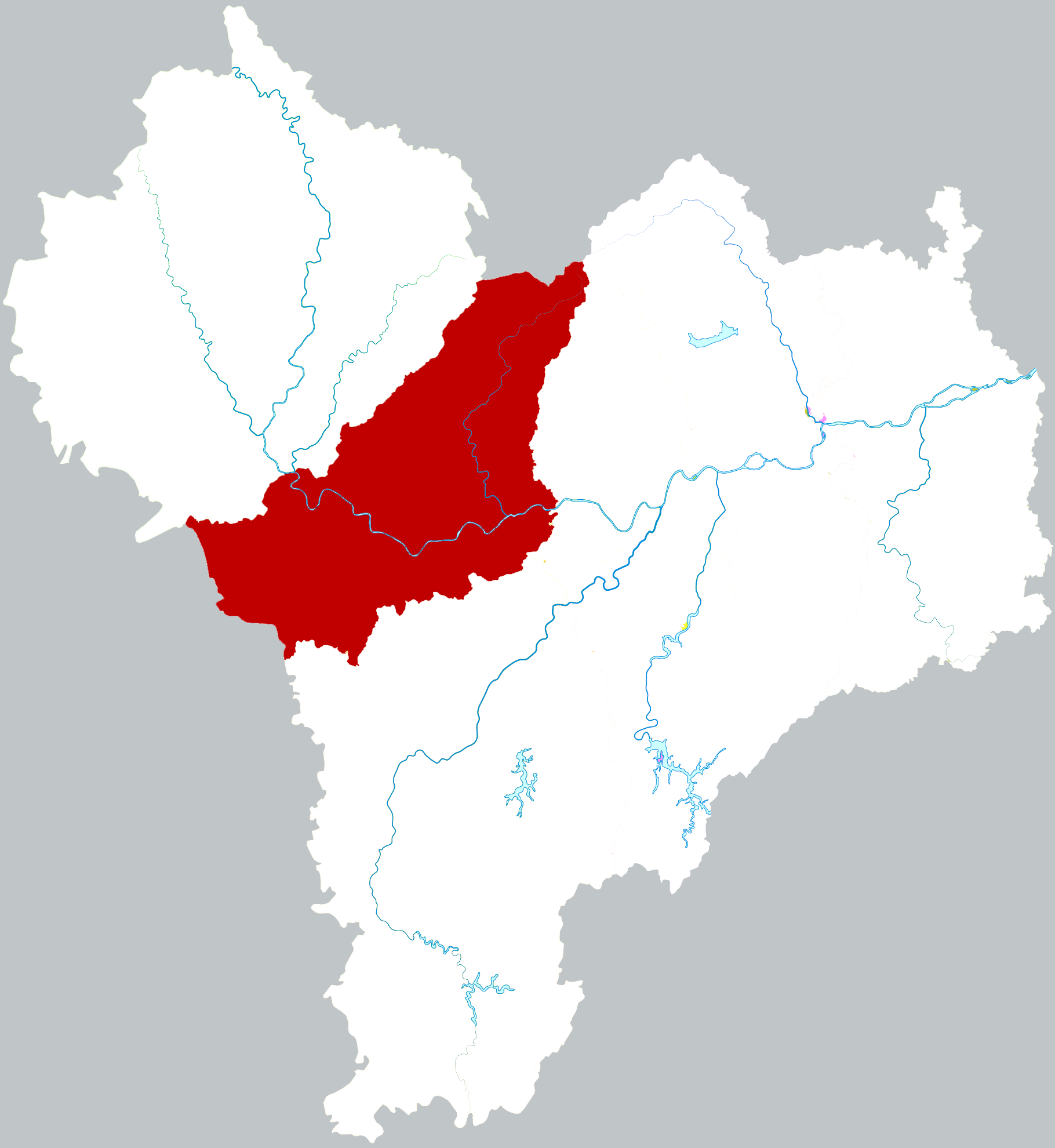
- Location of Changshan County within Quzhou

- Location of the seat in Zhejiang
- Coordinates: 28°54′04″N 118°30′40″E
- Country: People's Republic of China
- Province: Zhejiang
- Prefecture-level city: Quzhou

Area
  - Total: 1,097.32 km^{2} (423.68 sq mi)

Population (2020)
  - Total: 259,966
  - Density: 236.910/km^{2} (613.594/sq mi)
- Time zone: UTC+8 (China Standard)

Changshan County (Chinese: 常山县; pinyin: Chángshān Xiàn) is a county under the jurisdiction of the prefecture-level city of Quzhou in the west of Zhejiang Province, People's Republic of China, bordering Jiangxi Province to the southwest. The county's total area is 1099 square kilometers, and its population is 320,000 people. The county's postal code is 324200. The county government is located at 29 Shengli Road in Tianma town.

The area has a long history of loquat and bitter orange cultivation. Local farmers also grow tea and waxberries.

== Administrative divisions ==
The county administers 7 towns, 14 townships, 11 residential areas, and 341 administrative villages.

Towns (镇):

- Tianma, Zhaoxian, Huibu, Fangcun, Qiuchuan, Baishi, and Qingshi.

Townships (乡):

- Hejia, Songfan, Donglu, Xinqiao, Jiarong, Xinchang, Jinyuan, Longrao, Tonggong, Qiankou, Daqiaotou, Wuli, Dong'an, and Gedi.

== Climate ==
Climate data for Changshan, elevation 137 m (449 ft), (1991–2020 normals, extremes 1981–present)
Month	Jan	Feb	Mar	Apr	May	Jun	Jul	Aug	Sep	Oct	Nov	Dec	Year
Record high °C (°F)	25.0 (77.0)	28.8 (83.8)	34.0 (93.2)	34.8 (94.6)	36.8 (98.2)	37.9 (100.2)	41.8 (107.2)	40.8 (105.4)	40.4 (104.7)	36.5 (97.7)	31.9 (89.4)	25.4 (77.7)	41.8 (107.2)
Mean daily maximum °C (°F)	10.1 (50.2)	12.8 (55.0)	16.8 (62.2)	22.9 (73.2)	27.4 (81.3)	29.4 (84.9)	33.9 (93.0)	33.8 (92.8)	29.9 (85.8)	24.8 (76.6)	18.8 (65.8)	12.7 (54.9)	22.8 (73.0)
Daily mean °C (°F)	5.9 (42.6)	8.2 (46.8)	11.9 (53.4)	17.6 (63.7)	22.3 (72.1)	25.0 (77.0)	28.8 (83.8)	28.5 (83.3)	25.0 (77.0)	19.8 (67.6)	13.9 (57.0)	8.0 (46.4)	17.9 (64.2)
Mean daily minimum °C (°F)	2.9 (37.2)	4.8 (40.6)	8.2 (46.8)	13.5 (56.3)	18.4 (65.1)	21.8 (71.2)	24.8 (76.6)	24.6 (76.3)	21.3 (70.3)	15.9 (60.6)	10.1 (50.2)	4.5 (40.1)	14.2 (57.6)
Record low °C (°F)	−6.5 (20.3)	−4.7 (23.5)	−3.3 (26.1)	2.9 (37.2)	8.8 (47.8)	13.3 (55.9)	18.9 (66.0)	18.2 (64.8)	12.7 (54.9)	3.8 (38.8)	−1.8 (28.8)	−7.8 (18.0)	−7.8 (18.0)
Average precipitation mm (inches)	92.3 (3.63)	110.5 (4.35)	195.6 (7.70)	222.7 (8.77)	229.0 (9.02)	373.5 (14.70)	189.3 (7.45)	131.5 (5.18)	78.4 (3.09)	54.5 (2.15)	94.0 (3.70)	73.9 (2.91)	1,845.2 (72.65)
Average precipitation days (≥ 0.1 mm)	14.1	13.4	17.9	16.4	16.3	17.9	11.8	12.8	9.2	7.5	10.5	10.5	158.3
Average snowy days	2.7	1.8	0.4	0	0	0	0	0	0	0	0.1	0.9	5.9
Average relative humidity (%)	76	76	77	76	76	82	75	75	74	70	74	74	75
Mean monthly sunshine hours	87.9	88.9	100.7	122.2	141.2	120.3	213.3	208.5	174.9	163.2	127.4	119.3	1,667.8
Percentage possible sunshine	27	28	27	32	34	29	50	51	48	46	40	37	37
Source: China Meteorological Administration All-time Dec High

== See also ==
- Fujiang Village
- Huangnitang Village, Changshan
