= Huangnitang Village, Changshan =

Huangnitang 黄泥塘
- Village
- Location in Zhejiang
- Coordinates: 28°55′00″N 118°31′56″E
- Country: People's Republic of China
- Province: Zhejiang
- Prefecture-level city: Quzhou
- County: Changshan County
- Subdistrict: Tianma Subdistrict
- Village: Zhoutang

Huangnitang (simplified Chinese: 黄泥塘; traditional Chinese: 黃泥塘; pinyin: Huángnítáng) is a village of Zhoutang village (周塘村), Tianma Subdistrict (天马街道), Changshan County, Quzhou, Zhejiang Province, China. It is the location of the Global Boundary Stratotype Section and Point (GSSP), which marks the boundary between the Third and Darriwilian Stages of the Middle Ordovician. The GSSP was ratified by the International Union of Geological Sciences in 1997.

The boundary is defined as the first appearance of the graptolite Undulograptus austrodentatus. The graptolite Arienigraptus zhejiangensis appears 0.5 m below this boundary. The rock section is shale.

== See also ==
- List of villages in China
