= Fengjian Village =

Village in Foshan, China

Fengjian 逢简
- Village
- Location in Guangdong
- Coordinates: 22.8128°N 113.1549°E
- Country: People's Republic of China
- Province: Guangdong
- Prefecture-level city: Foshan
- County-level city: Shunde
- Town: Xingtan

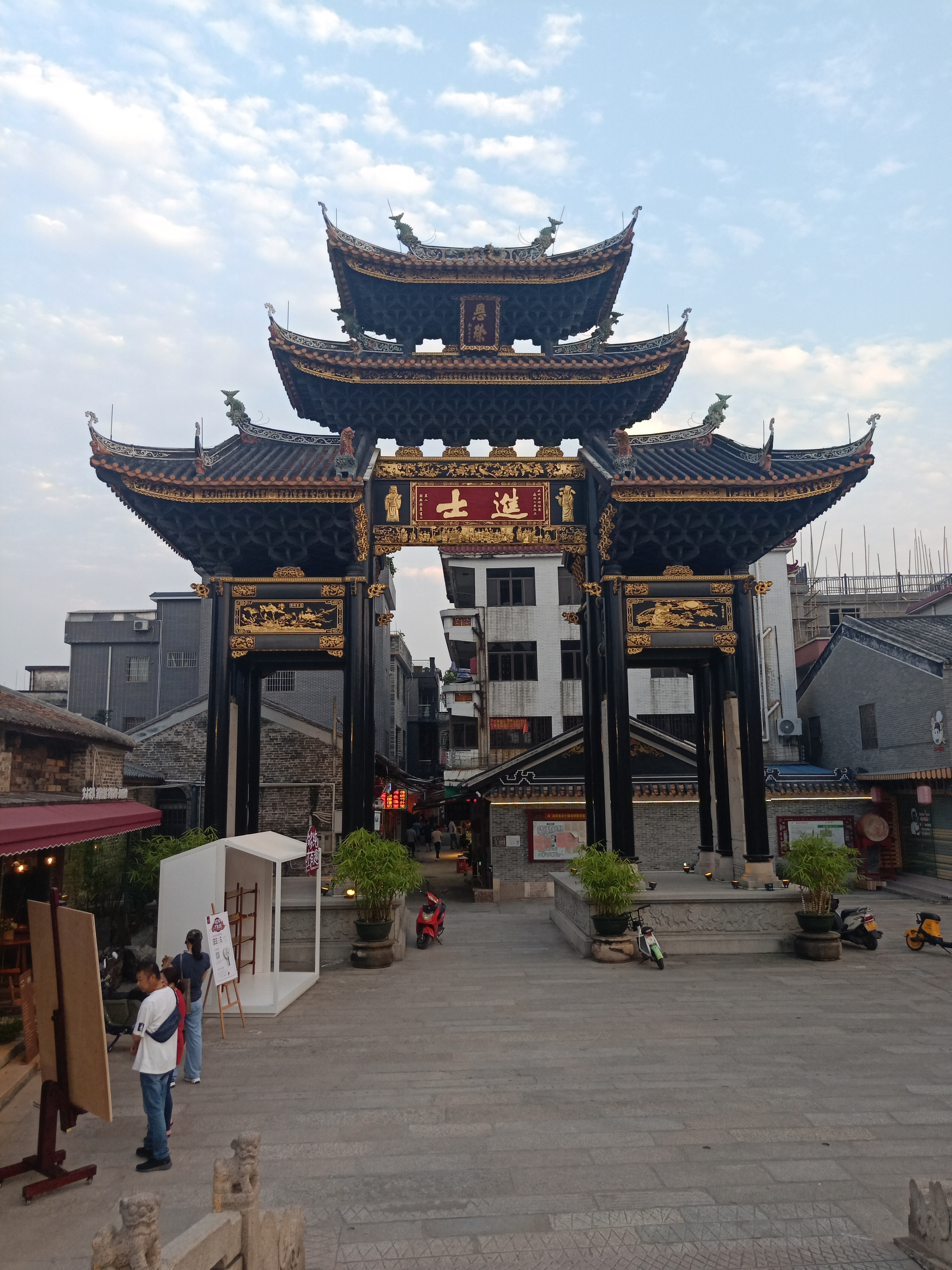
Jinshi Archway in Fengjian Village

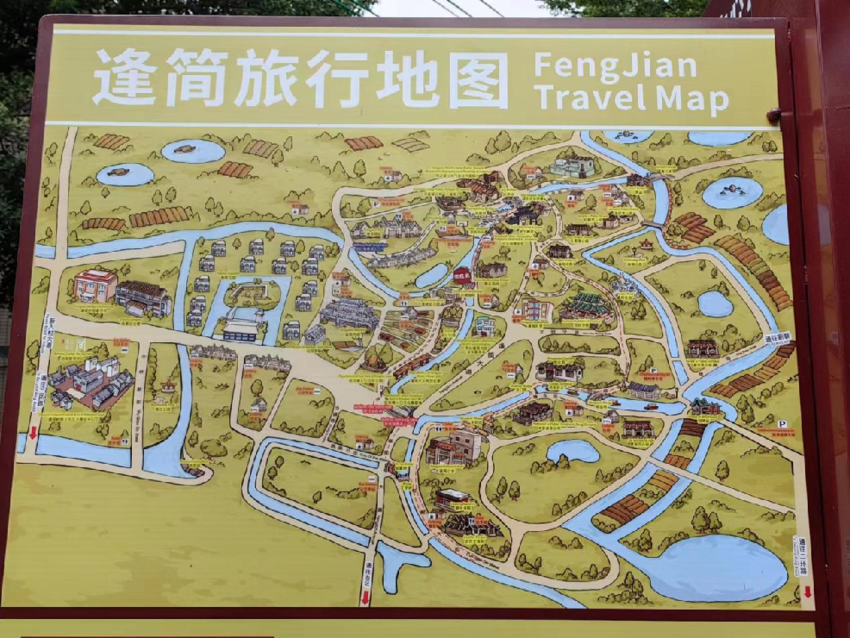
Map of Fengjian Village highlighting points of interest

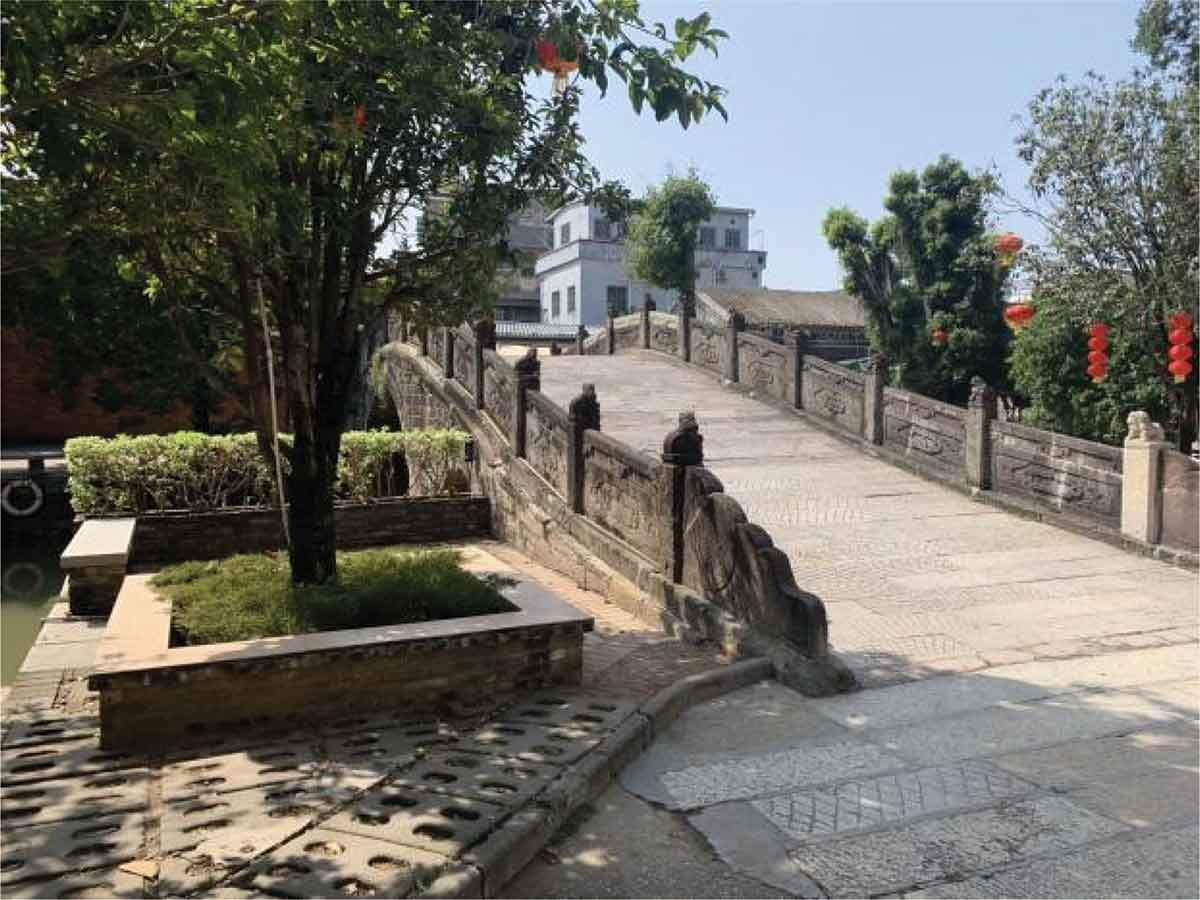
Photo of Mingyuan bridge in Fengjian Village

Fengjian Village (Chinese: 逢简村) is a village in Xingtan Town, Shunde, Foshan, Guangdong, China with a total area of 5.22 square kilometres (2.02 sq mi).

The village has a long history and features historic sites throughout. It has three stone arch bridges: the Juji (Chinese: 巨济桥) and Mingyuan Bridges (Chinese: 明远桥) built in the Song Dynasty (960–1279), and the Jin'ao Bridge (Chinese: 金鳌桥), given building permission by the Kangxi Emperor during the Qing Dynasty (1644–1911). Ancient temples, shrines and houses abound amongst a network of rivers and streams. Due to comparisons of the local scenery with the noted sights of Zhouzhuang in Jiangsu province, the village is also known as the "Zhouzhuang of Shunde" (顺德周庄).

== History ==
There has been archaeological evidence of human activity in the Fengjian area dating back to the Western Han dynasty. Artifacts from this era and the Song, Ming, and Qing dynasties have been found at the Biwu (Chinese: 碧梧) Western Han Dynasty Site.

== Features ==
- Stone arch bridges: the Juji (Chinese: 巨济桥) and Mingyuan Bridges (Chinese: 明远桥) built in the Song Dynasty (960–1279), and the Jin'ao Bridge (Chinese: 金鳌桥), given building permission by the Kangxi Emperor during the Qing Dynasty (1644–1911).
- Jinshi Archway
- Ancestral halls
  - Liu family ancestral hall (Chinese: 劉氏大宗祠)
  - Li family ancestral hall (Song Shenzheng Li's Ancestral Hall) (Chinese: 宋参政李公祠)
- Golden Osmanthus tree (Chinese: 金桂树). The tree was a gift to Li Chiangming (Chinese: 李昌明), a native of Fengjian, from the Emperor Guanxu of the Qing Dynasty.

== See also ==
- List of villages in China
