= Zhongdong, Ziyun County =

Village in a cave in Guizhou, China

Coordinates: 25°41′12″N 106°17′33″E

Zhongdong (Chinese: 中洞; lit. 'Middle Cave') is a village within Zhong Cave in Ziyun county of Anshun Prefecture, in Guizhou Province of China. The village is located within the Getu River Scenic Area (格凸河穿洞风景名胜区) in Shuitang Town.

It is thought to be the only inhabited, year-round settlement in China located inside a naturally occurring cave. The limestone Zhong Cave is the largest of three local caves, set between an upper and lower cave that are uninhabited.

== Zhong Cave ==
Zhong Cave is 230 m (750 ft) long, 115 m (377 ft) wide, and 50 m (160 ft) high, comparable in size to over one and a half soccer fields.

The cave, at 1,800 m (5,900 ft) in elevation, is only accessible on foot after over an hour's hike.

=== Village ===
Some villagers claim that the village was settled after the 1949 Communist Revolution to escape banditry, while others claim that the village has been there for countless generations before then.

Twenty families, of the Miao ethnic minority, live in the cave, growing corn on the mountain and raising chickens, pigs, and cows. Water is collected from dripping stones, with shortages during the dry season. In 2007, the villagers began building a concrete reservoir to improve water security. As of 2007, the village had a population of close to 100.

The village's houses have woven bamboo walls, and are unique for having no roofs, relying on the cave's natural shelter. The village relies on wood-fired hearths for heat and cooking, but electrical service was set up in the last decade, powering lights and a small number of appliances such as television sets and washing machines.

The Chinese government built concrete housing below the mountain for the Zhongdong villagers, but they refused to move there, citing the housing as substandard. The village has one primary school with six classes and 200 students, many of whom are boarders from other local villages, and it is possibly the only cave school in the world.

== See also ==
- List of villages in China
