= Shuibu =

Shuibu 水步镇
- Town
- Location in Guangdong
- Coordinates: 22°20′25″N 112°48′07″E
- Country: People's Republic of China
- Province: Guangdong
- Prefecture-level city: Jiangshan
- County-level city: Taishan
- Village-level divisions: 1 residential community 20 villages
- Time zone: UTC+8 (China Standard)
- Postal code: 529200
- Area code: 0750

Shuibu (Chinese: 水步; pinyin: Shuǐbù; Jyutping: seoi^{2}bou^{6}) is a town of Taishan, Guangdong province, China, near Kaiping. As of 2011, It has one residential community (社区) and 20 villages under its administration. Gary Locke, the United States Ambassador to China and the former Governor of the US State of Washington, visited the town in 1997, to visit his ancestral home of Kut Lung or Lilong (吉龍/吉龙).

== See also ==
- Xiqi Village
