= Mijiazhuang =

MiJiaZhuang is a small village in the Yunnan province of China. Its population comprises 104 families, mostly of Miao origin.

== See also ==
- List of villages in China
