= Biyang County =

Biyang County 泌阳县 Piyang
- County
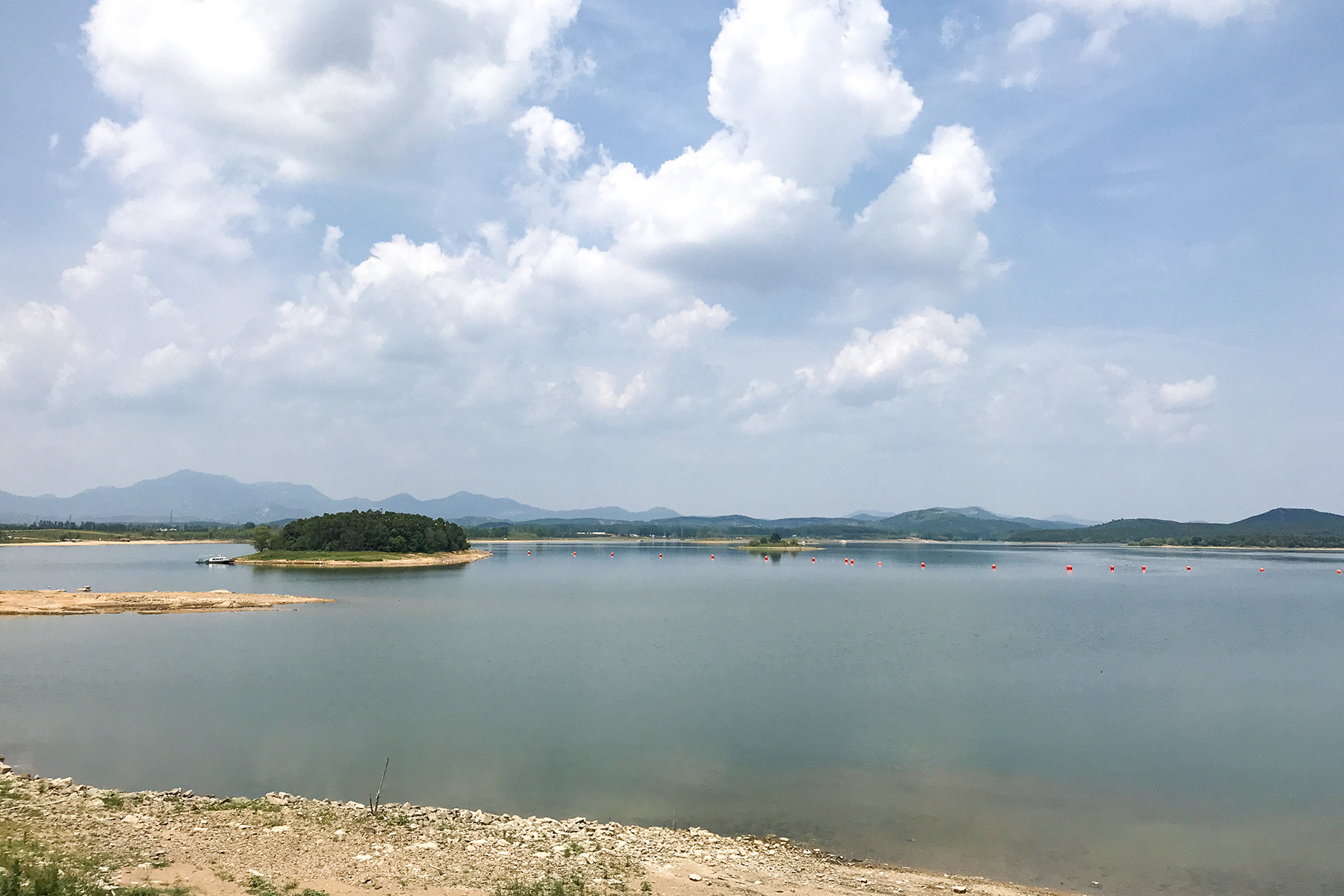

- Location of the seat in Henan
- Coordinates: 32°43′52″N 113°19′37″E
- Country: People's Republic of China
- Province: Henan
- Prefecture-level city: Zhumadian

Area
  - Total: 2,789 km^{2} (1,077 sq mi)

Population (2019)
  - Total: 675,500
  - Density: 242.2/km^{2} (627.3/sq mi)
- Time zone: UTC+8 (China Standard)
- Postal code: 463700

Biyang County (simplified Chinese: 泌阳县; traditional Chinese: 泌陽縣; pinyin: Bìyáng Xiàn) is a county of Zhumadian city in southern Henan province, People's Republic of China. It borders Queshan to the east, Tongbai to the north, Tanghe to the west, Luohe to the north, Sheqi and Nanyang to the northwest. Population was 950,000 in 2002. Area is 2,682 km^{2} (1,036 sq mi).

== Administration ==
The county has 7 towns, 18 townships and 401 villages.

Towns

- Bishui Town (泌水镇)
- Chunshui Town (春水镇)
- Shahe Town (沙河店镇)
- Magutian Town (马谷田镇)
- Banqiao Town (板桥镇) - near which the infamous Banqiao Dam is located
- Yangce Town (羊册镇) (including Shangfeng village)
- Guoji Township (郭集镇)

Townships

- Guanzhuang Township (官庄乡)
- Huayuan Township (花园乡)
- Xianghe Township (象河乡)
- Wangdian Township (王店乡)
- Fuzhuang Township (付庄乡)
- Huangshan Township (黄山口乡)
- Jialou Township (贾楼乡)
- Gaodian Township (高店乡)
- Taishanmiao Township (泰山庙乡)
- Gaoyi Township (高邑乡)
- Chenzhuang Township (陈庄乡)
- Yangjiaji Township (杨家集乡)
- Xiabeisi Township (下碑寺乡)
- Tongshan Township (铜山乡)
- Shuangmiao Township (双庙街乡)
- Shewan Township (赊湾乡)
- Laohe Township (老河乡)

== Climate ==
Climate data for Biyang, elevation 161 m (528 ft), (1991–2020 normals, extremes 1981–present)
Month	Jan	Feb	Mar	Apr	May	Jun	Jul	Aug	Sep	Oct	Nov	Dec	Year
Record high °C (°F)	18.7 (65.7)	25.3 (77.5)	33.8 (92.8)	34.1 (93.4)	37.5 (99.5)	38.8 (101.8)	41.0 (105.8)	38.0 (100.4)	39.5 (103.1)	33.0 (91.4)	27.6 (81.7)	20.7 (69.3)	41.0 (105.8)
Mean daily maximum °C (°F)	7.0 (44.6)	10.5 (50.9)	15.8 (60.4)	22.4 (72.3)	27.3 (81.1)	30.8 (87.4)	32.1 (89.8)	31.2 (88.2)	27.2 (81.0)	22.2 (72.0)	15.4 (59.7)	9.2 (48.6)	20.9 (69.7)
Daily mean °C (°F)	1.5 (34.7)	4.6 (40.3)	9.7 (49.5)	16.0 (60.8)	21.2 (70.2)	25.4 (77.7)	27.4 (81.3)	26.3 (79.3)	21.8 (71.2)	16.1 (61.0)	9.4 (48.9)	3.5 (38.3)	15.2 (59.4)
Mean daily minimum °C (°F)	−2.4 (27.7)	0.2 (32.4)	4.8 (40.6)	10.3 (50.5)	15.8 (60.4)	20.6 (69.1)	23.5 (74.3)	22.7 (72.9)	17.7 (63.9)	11.7 (53.1)	5.1 (41.2)	−0.5 (31.1)	10.8 (51.4)
Record low °C (°F)	−14.3 (6.3)	−17.6 (0.3)	−8.5 (16.7)	−1.0 (30.2)	4.0 (39.2)	11.6 (52.9)	17.1 (62.8)	14.1 (57.4)	7.6 (45.7)	−0.5 (31.1)	−5.9 (21.4)	−17.8 (0.0)	−17.8 (0.0)
Average precipitation mm (inches)	16.5 (0.65)	21.1 (0.83)	39.6 (1.56)	52.7 (2.07)	83.1 (3.27)	126.3 (4.97)	197.3 (7.77)	130.8 (5.15)	75.3 (2.96)	55.9 (2.20)	38.4 (1.51)	15.6 (0.61)	852.6 (33.55)
Average precipitation days (≥ 0.1 mm)	5.2	6.5	7.6	8.2	9.7	9.3	12.6	11.7	9.3	8.5	7.1	5.2	100.9
Average snowy days	4.5	3.4	1.3	0	0	0	0	0	0	0	0.8	2.2	12.2
Average relative humidity (%)	71	70	69	70	70	73	80	81	77	74	74	71	73
Mean monthly sunshine hours	116.0	120.1	147.8	171.8	180.3	169.1	178.2	170.2	141.3	140.1	130.8	129.4	1,795.1
Percentage possible sunshine	36	38	40	44	42	40	41	42	38	40	42	42	40
Source: China Meteorological Administration
