= Hongliutan =

Hongliutan 红柳滩村
- Village
- Interactive map of Hongliutan
- Coordinates: 37°49′47″N 110°08′33″E
- Country: People's Republic of China
- Province: Shaanxi
- Prefecture-level city: Yulin
- District: Yuyang District
- Town: Zhenchuan

Hongliutan (simplified Chinese: 红柳滩; traditional Chinese: 紅柳灘; pinyin: Hóngliǔtān) is a village near the town of Zhenchuan (镇川镇), Yuyang District, Yulin prefecture in Shaanxi province, China.

Hongliutan has a school run by the Black Dragons and is on the banks of the Wuding River. An ancient Black Dragon temple stood in the village until it was destroyed in the 1960s by followers of Mao Zedong. It was rebuilt in 1986. The chief of the village is Wang Kehua (王克华).

== See also ==
- List of villages in China
