= Baishuitai =

Village in northwestern Yun-nan province, China

Coordinates: 27°30′09″N 100°02′11″E

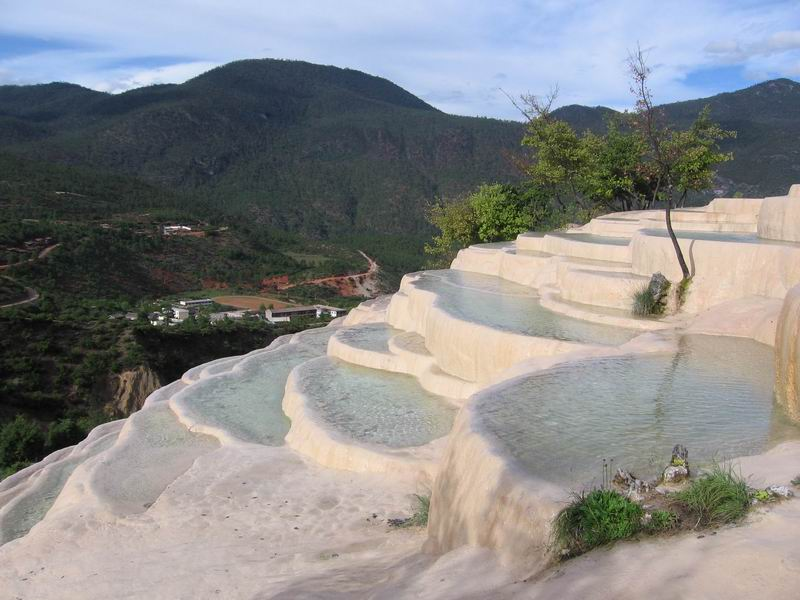
The mineral terraces of Baishuitai

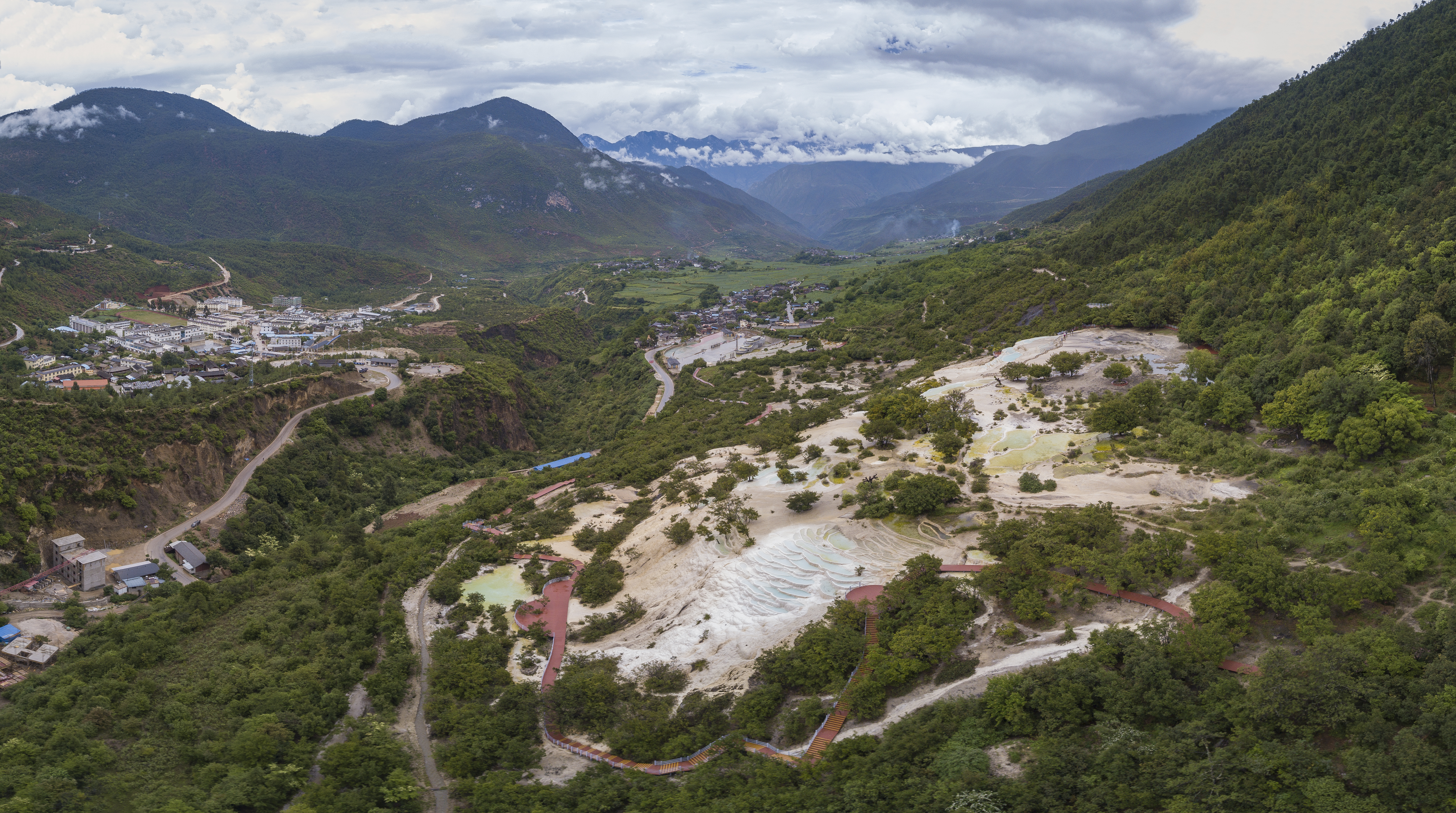
Aerial panorama of the village

Baishuitai (Chinese: 白水臺; pinyin: Báishuǐtái; Wade–Giles: Pai-shui-tʻai; lit. 'White Water Terrace') is a travertine located in Baidicun (Pai-ti-tsʻun, 白地村), a village between Li-chiang and Shangri-La County in Sanba Township (三垻鄉), Shangri-La County, Dêqên Tibetan Autonomous Prefecture, northwestern Yunnan province, China. Slightly north of Ha-pa-hsüeh-shan near the upper Yangtze river valley, it is noted for its natural mineral terraces.

== Transportation ==
=== From Tiger Leaping Gorge ===
In October 2013, a daily bus ran between Tiger Leaping Gorge and Baishuitai at a price of 55 RMB. Tickets can be purchased at Tina's Guest House or Tibet Guest House. Taxis can be arranged, at a price of around 300 RMB.

=== From Shangri-la ===
In August 2013, there were two daily buses operating between Shangri-la and Baishuitai, one leaving Shangri-la at 9 am and one at 2 pm. The ticket price was 25 RMB. The journey of about 90 km lasts around 3 hours, because of the very difficult mountain road.

== See also ==
- Huanglong Scenic and Historic Interest Area, China
- List of villages in China
