= Xingtan, Guangdong =

Town in Foshan, China

Coordinates: 22°47′N 113°09′E

Xingtan
- Simplified Chinese: 杏壇
- Postal: Hengtan
Transcriptions
Standard Mandarin
- Wade–Giles: Hsing^{4}-t'an^{2}

Xingtan (simplified Chinese: 杏坛镇; traditional Chinese: 杏壇鎮) is a town, part of Shunde district, in Foshan prefecture-level city, Guangdong Province, southern China.

It has an area of 122.07 square kilometres (47.13 sq mi). Settlements in the Xingtan area date back to the Ming Dynasty, and it was officially established as a town in 1987.

== See also ==
- Fengjian Village
