= Lingchuan County, Guangxi =

Lingchuan County 灵川县 Lingchwan
- County
- Location of the seat in Guangxi
- Coordinates: 25°25′N 110°20′E
- Country: China
- Autonomous region: Guangxi
- Prefecture-level city: Guilin
- County seat: Lingchuan Town

Area
  - Total: 2,288 km^{2} (883 sq mi)
- Elevation: 153 m (502 ft)

Population (2017)
  - Total: 385,200
  - Density: 168.4/km^{2} (436.0/sq mi)
- Time zone: UTC+8 (China Standard)
- 541200: 541200
- Area code: 0773
- Licence plate prefixes: 桂C and 桂H
- Website: www.lcxzf.gov.cn

Lingchuan County (simplified Chinese: 灵川县; traditional Chinese: 靈川縣; pinyin: Língchuān Xiàn) is a county in the northeast of Guangxi, China. It is under the administration of Guilin city.

The Yao of Lingchuan County consist of the Pan Yao 盘瑶 (Guoshan Yao 过山瑶) and Red Yao 红瑶. The Pan Yao live in Haiyangping 海洋坪 and other locations, while the Red Yao live in Jiuwu 九屋, Lantian 蓝田, Gongping 公平, and other locations.

== Administrative divisions ==
Lingchuan County is divided into 7 towns, 3 townships and 2 ethnic townships:

towns

- Lingchuan Town 灵川镇
- Daxu Town 大圩镇
- Dingjiang Town 定江镇
- Sanjie Town 三街镇
- Tanxia Town 潭下镇
- Jiuwu Town 九屋镇
- Lingtian Town 灵田镇

townships

- Chaotian Township 潮田乡
- Haiyang Township 海洋乡
- Gongping Township 公平乡

ethnic townships

- Dajing Yao Ethnic Township 大境瑶族乡
- Lantian Yao Ethnic Township 兰田瑶族乡

== Climate ==
Climate data for Lingchuan, elevation 191 m (627 ft), (1991–2020 normals, extremes 1981–present)
Month	Jan	Feb	Mar	Apr	May	Jun	Jul	Aug	Sep	Oct	Nov	Dec	Year
Record high °C (°F)	25.8 (78.4)	30.9 (87.6)	32.9 (91.2)	34.7 (94.5)	35.2 (95.4)	37.1 (98.8)	39.5 (103.1)	39.7 (103.5)	38.0 (100.4)	35.0 (95.0)	32.1 (89.8)	26.9 (80.4)	39.7 (103.5)
Mean daily maximum °C (°F)	11.7 (53.1)	14.1 (57.4)	17.4 (63.3)	23.7 (74.7)	27.9 (82.2)	30.6 (87.1)	33.0 (91.4)	33.4 (92.1)	31.0 (87.8)	26.3 (79.3)	20.8 (69.4)	14.9 (58.8)	23.7 (74.7)
Daily mean °C (°F)	8.3 (46.9)	10.5 (50.9)	13.8 (56.8)	19.4 (66.9)	23.6 (74.5)	26.4 (79.5)	28.1 (82.6)	28.2 (82.8)	25.9 (78.6)	21.5 (70.7)	16.1 (61.0)	10.7 (51.3)	19.4 (66.9)
Mean daily minimum °C (°F)	5.9 (42.6)	8.1 (46.6)	11.3 (52.3)	16.4 (61.5)	20.5 (68.9)	23.7 (74.7)	25.0 (77.0)	24.8 (76.6)	22.4 (72.3)	18.0 (64.4)	12.8 (55.0)	7.7 (45.9)	16.4 (61.5)
Record low °C (°F)	−1.7 (28.9)	−1.2 (29.8)	0.8 (33.4)	5.7 (42.3)	10.4 (50.7)	14.5 (58.1)	18.6 (65.5)	19.5 (67.1)	13.5 (56.3)	6.5 (43.7)	1.0 (33.8)	−2.8 (27.0)	−2.8 (27.0)
Average precipitation mm (inches)	73.8 (2.91)	97.2 (3.83)	160.2 (6.31)	215.9 (8.50)	351.9 (13.85)	464.0 (18.27)	277.0 (10.91)	156.0 (6.14)	73.1 (2.88)	58.7 (2.31)	88.3 (3.48)	54.5 (2.15)	2,070.6 (81.54)
Average precipitation days (≥ 0.1 mm)	13.9	13.9	19.7	19.5	18.9	19.4	17.0	12.4	8.1	7.4	9.0	10.2	169.4
Average snowy days	1.3	0.6	0.1	0	0	0	0	0	0	0	0	0.4	2.4
Average relative humidity (%)	73	75	79	80	80	83	80	77	71	67	68	66	75
Mean monthly sunshine hours	55.9	51.0	54.5	76.7	106.6	110.6	180.6	196.5	179.4	151.6	118.7	96.9	1,379
Percentage possible sunshine	17	16	15	20	26	27	43	49	49	43	37	30	31
Source: China Meteorological Administration

== Transport ==
=== Rail ===
Lingchuan has two railway stations, Guilin West Station and Lingchuan Station.

Guilin West Station is in Dingjiang Town, Lingchuan, on the Guiyang–Guangzhou High-Speed Railway and Hunan–Guangxi Railway Freight Ring Line. It's a Second-class Station and under China Railway Nanning Group's administration.

Lingchuan Station is a Forth-class station and is no longer handling passenger and freight business.

=== Bus ===
Lingchuan has a coach station. The coach line connecting all towns in Lingchuan and some other cities like Liuzhou, Hengyang. The bus service between Guilin and Lingchuan are Route 301, Route 302, Route 306. Route 301 and Route 302 is operating by Dingxiang Bus Service Co, Ltd (鼎翔巴士). Route 306 is operating by Tongda Bus Service Co, Ltd (通达公交).

=== Highways ===
G72 Quanzhou–Nanning Expressway and China National Highway 322 are the main highways in Lingchuan.

== See also ==
- Wangtang, Lingchuan County
