= Yuyang District =

Coordinates: 38°12′19″N 109°39′14″E

Yuyang 榆阳区
- District
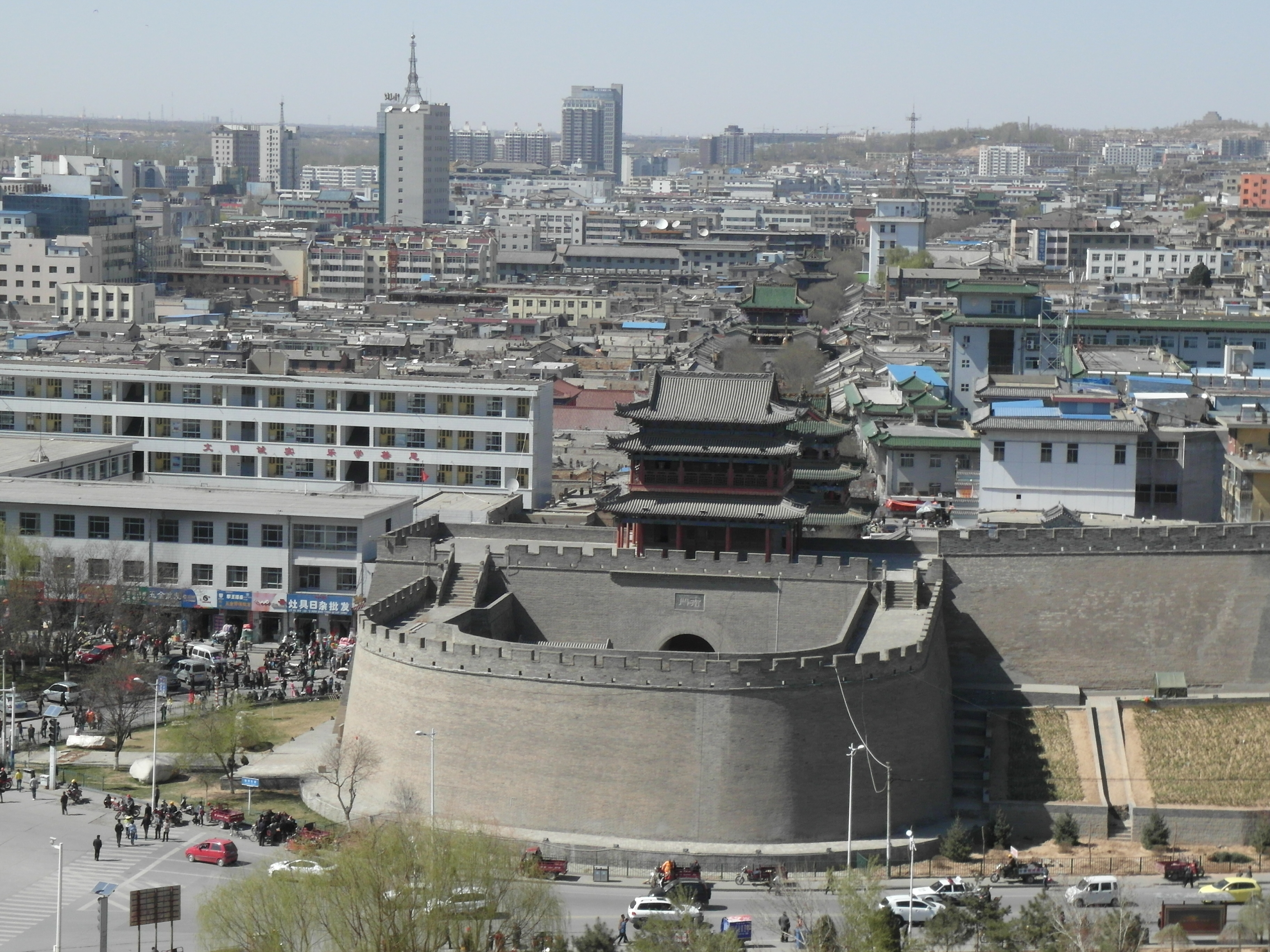

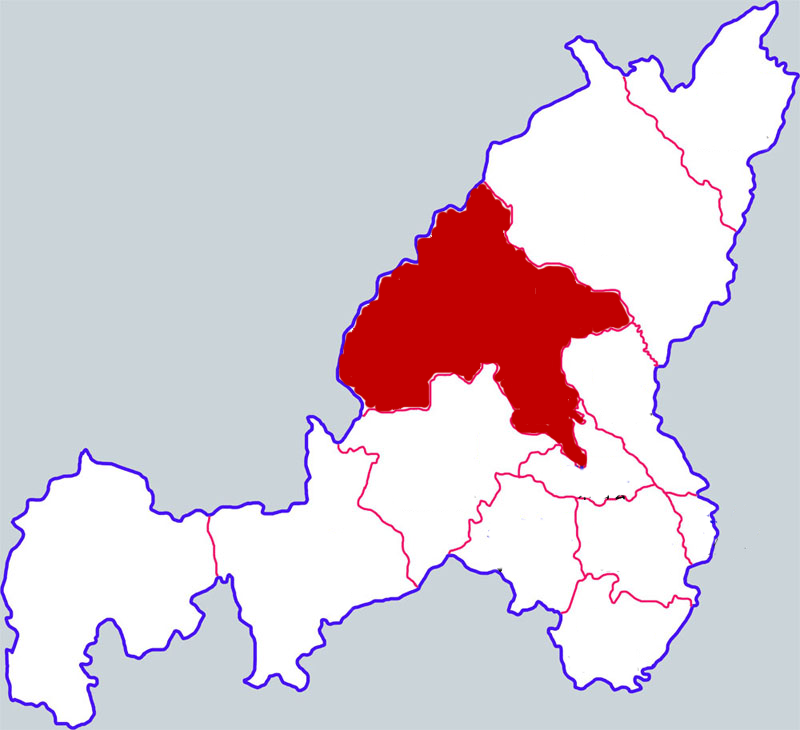
- Yuyang in Yulin

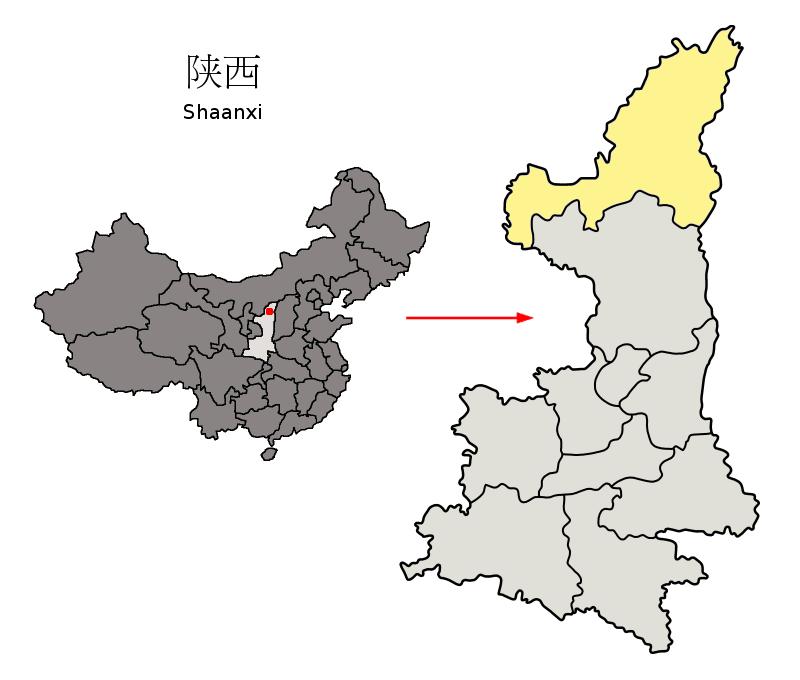
- Yulin in Shaanxi
- Country: People's Republic of China
- Province: Shaanxi
- Prefecture-level city: Yulin

Area
  - Total: 7,053 km^{2} (2,723 sq mi)

Population (2019)
  - Total: 575,100
  - Density: 81.54/km^{2} (211.2/sq mi)
- Time zone: UTC+8 (China standard time)
- Postal code: 719000
- Licence plates: 陕K

Yuyang District (simplified Chinese: 榆阳区; traditional Chinese: 榆陽區; pinyin: Yúyáng Qū), is a district of Yulin, Shaanxi, China, bordering Inner Mongolia to the west.

== Administrative divisions ==
As of 2019, Yuyang District is divided to 6 subdistricts, 14 towns and 5 townships.

Subdistricts

- Gulou Subdistrict (鼓楼街道)
- Qingshanlu Subdistrict (青山路街道)
- Shangjunlu Subdistrict (上郡路街道)
- Xinminglou Subdistrict (新明楼街道)
- Tuofenglu Subdistrict (驼峰路街道)
- Chongwenlu Subdistrict (崇文路街道)
- Hangyulu Subdistrict (航宇路街道)
- Changchenglu Subdistrict (长城路街道)
- Jinshalu Subdistrict (金沙路街道)
- Chaoyanglu Subdistrict (朝阳路街道)
- Shahelu Subdistrict (沙河路街道)
- Mingzhulu Subdistrict (明珠路街道)

Towns

- Yuhe (鱼河镇)
- Shangyanwan (上盐湾镇)
- Zhenchuan (镇川镇)
- Mahuangliang (麻黄梁镇)
- Niujialiang (牛家梁镇)
- Jinjitan (金鸡滩镇)
- Mahe (马合镇)
- Balasu (巴拉素镇)
- Yuhemao (鱼河峁镇)
- Qingyun (青云镇)
- Guta (古塔镇)
- Daheta (大河塔镇)
- Xiaojihan (小纪汗镇)
- Qinhe (芹河镇)

Townships

- Mengjiawan Township (孟家湾乡)
- Xiaohaotu Township (小壕兔乡)
- Chaheze Township (岔河则乡)
- Bulanghe Township (补浪河乡)
- Hongshiqiao Township (红石桥乡)

== See also ==
- Hongliutan, Zhenchuan, Yuyang
