= Likeng Village =

Village in Jiangxi, eastern China

- Village
- A street in the village

- Map of Jiangxi
- Coordinates: 29°19′32″N 117°55′34″E

Population
  - Total: 6,340

Likeng Village is a village in Wuyuan county, Jiangxi, eastern China. It supposedly is populated only by people with the last name "Li". With a history of more than a thousand years, it was first built in the Song dynasty.

== History ==
Likeng Village has been around since 1010. In the Song dynasty, there were 32 officials out of over 100 people who rose to fame and power after completing their duties. They decided to build their home village of Likeng. In the process, they made 17 temples, 12 ancestral halls, many bridges, and houses along streets. They also wrote 29 famous books. The former residence of a Song-era martial arts scholar, Li Zhicheng, is also situated here, containing an inner garden with an 800-year-old crape myrtle tree. Later, in the Ming dynasty, more farm- and normal houses were built in the Huizhou style of architecture, which, specifically for the village, means houses painted bright white with crystal-cyan roofs. Pottery, art and calligraphy endemic to these time periods was made. In 1109, the Zhongshu bridge, which is 9 feet (2.7 m) high and 13 feet (4.0 m) long, was built as an entrance to the village, connecting it to a river. Many relics and wood carvings were also made in the Ming and Qing dynasties.

During the Mongol conquest of China, refugees would come to villages such as this in Jiangxi province, due to its concealed location (it is surrounded by mountains on three sides).

The Wenchang temple is the home of the Ming/Qing relics and is considered a temple of happiness. Locals strongly believe that the village's growth stems and benefits from this temple.

== Tourism ==
The village is a popular tourist site. The temples and restaurants as well as the ancient architecture are also popular.

== Geography ==
Likeng Village is in eastern Wuyuan county, seven miles (11 km) from the center. The county is in Jiangxi province of east China, in the east Chinese mixed forests ecoregion at the Yellow River. A subtropical area prevails in the southeast of China (except southern Taiwan and the extreme southern fringe of China's coast, which is tropical), and Likeng Village is near the extreme northeastern end of the climatic ecoregion. It, however, is also marginally in the ecoregion of eastern Chinese mixed forests, implying a temperate environment despite the extremely hot summers. The village is in or near the Yellow Mountains, which occupy most of the periphery of Jiangxi.

=== Climate ===
The climate of Likeng Village is humid subtropical (Cfa), bordering on a hot-summer subtropical highland or monsoon influenced humid subtropical (Cwa) climate. It has hot, extremely rainy summers and cold, dry winters without significant snowfall. From mid-July to mid-August, the dew point exceeds 75 °F (24 °C) approximately half of the time, and on July 27, the most humid day of the year, the dew point is always above 65 °F (18 °C). Average daily means are at or above 72 °F (22 °C) from May to September, and at or above 50 °F (10 °C) from March through November, consistent with the climate type and even suggesting a tropical climate with extreme amplitude. The average low in the hottest month is over 30 F higher than the average high in the coldest month, again suggesting high temperature amplitude. Despite precipitation levels, which peak in summer, the highest percent of possible sunshine occurs in August at 51%. Average mean minima are barely below freezing, and mean maxima are extremely high, at 99 °F (37 °C). The city's precipitation level as a yearly whole is high, at 53.71 inches (1,364 mm).

=== Flora ===
Likeng Village as well as the area in general is known for its flora, which involves many species of flowering plants, including 124 that are only found in Jiangxi. These plants include (but are not limited to), rhododendrons, rapeseeds (endemic to Wuyuan), navel orange flowers, and other endemic plants. These mostly grow around the edges of the province, at slightly higher elevations [rhododendron grows between 500–2,700 metres (1,600–8,900 ft), for example]. Rhododendrons bloom between late April and June, while rapeseeds bloom slightly earlier, between March and April. Some of the village's camphor trees are as old as the village itself and are well-known and liked for that reason.

The flora of this area is, interestingly, more similar to that of Japan than of Manchuria or Korea, despite the fact that Japan is an archipelago and Korea and Manchuria are connected to the rest of China.

== See also ==
- Jinggang Mountains
- Yellow Mountains
- Huang He Plain mixed forests
- Huang He
- Eastern China
