= Wangtang, Hunan =

Wangtang is the name of 3 villages in Hunan.

- Wangtang Village (网塘村), in Gaoyi Township (高椅乡) of Huitong County, located at 26°56′N 110°02′E, some 35 km east of the Huitong County seat and 20 km south of Hongjiang central city
- Wangtang Village (网塘村), in Shuping Township (熟坪乡) of the county-level city of Hongjiang, located at 27°12′N 110°08′E, some 30 km east of Hongjiang central city and 40 km south-east of Huaihua central city
- Wangtang Village (汪塘村), in Shuidongjiang Town (水东江镇) of Shaodong County, located at 27°13′N 112°04′E, about 60 km northwest of Hengyang. Until the mid-90s this was an actual Wangtang Township (汪塘乡), which was then merged into Shuidongjiang Township (which later became Shuidongjiang Town).
