= Xiqi, Taishan =

Coordinates: 22.3298°N 112.7913°E

Xiqi Village 西岐村
- Xiqi Village
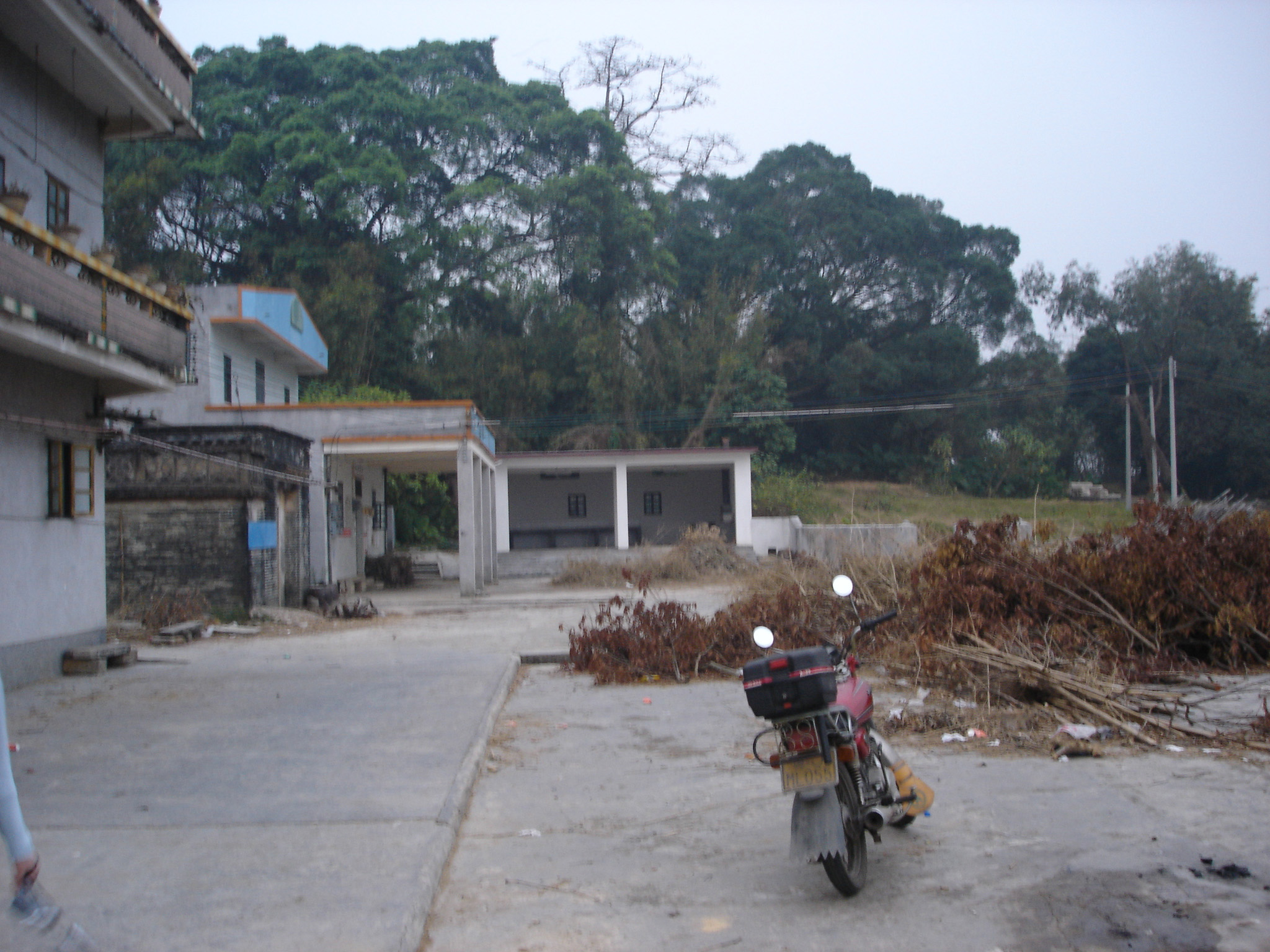
- Interactive map of Xiqi Village
- Country: China
- Province: Guangdong
- Prefecture-level city: Jiangmen
- County: Taishan
- Town: Shuibu

Population
  - Total: 50 (Still in Xiqi Village); 150 (live in the surrounding area inside Guangdong); 1,000 (moved to the United States)

Xiqi village (local name: Saikee/Saykee) (西岐村) is located in the town of Shuibu, in Taishan City, Jiangmen, Guangdong Province, southern China. Decades ago the village had 1,000 villagers but was almost completely depopulated by emigration to the United States such that fewer than 50 villagers today. It can therefore be viewed as the ancestral village of thousands of overseas Chinese throughout the Chinese diaspora, particularly in San Francisco, Chicago, Seattle, and Vancouver.

A 1958 U.S. Justice Department investigation identified the village as the source of what was, at the time, one of the largest illegal immigration operations in the United States. The smuggling operation, run by Huey Bing Dai for over 50 years, involved the illegal transplant of over 250 men, almost the entire male population of Xiqi village, to San Francisco. The incident became emblematic of countless similar Chinese human smuggling operations in the United States during the early to mid-twentieth century.

The village is also known for its typically Taishanese rectilinear layout which adheres to Feng shui principles, as well as its traditional courtyard houses. Xiqi's traditional village plan has received praise for its economical use of natural sunlight, vegetation screening, and nutrient resources, an efficient system that can still be used as a modern model.

Xiqi village's clan name is Xu (许) in Mandarin Chinese, although historically most villagers did not speak that language and instead used the Cantonese or Taishanese transliteration of the surname: Hui/Huey/Huie.

Xiqi village's name is transliterated from Mandarin, but names from other dialects used are Saikee/Saykee Village.

== Gallery ==
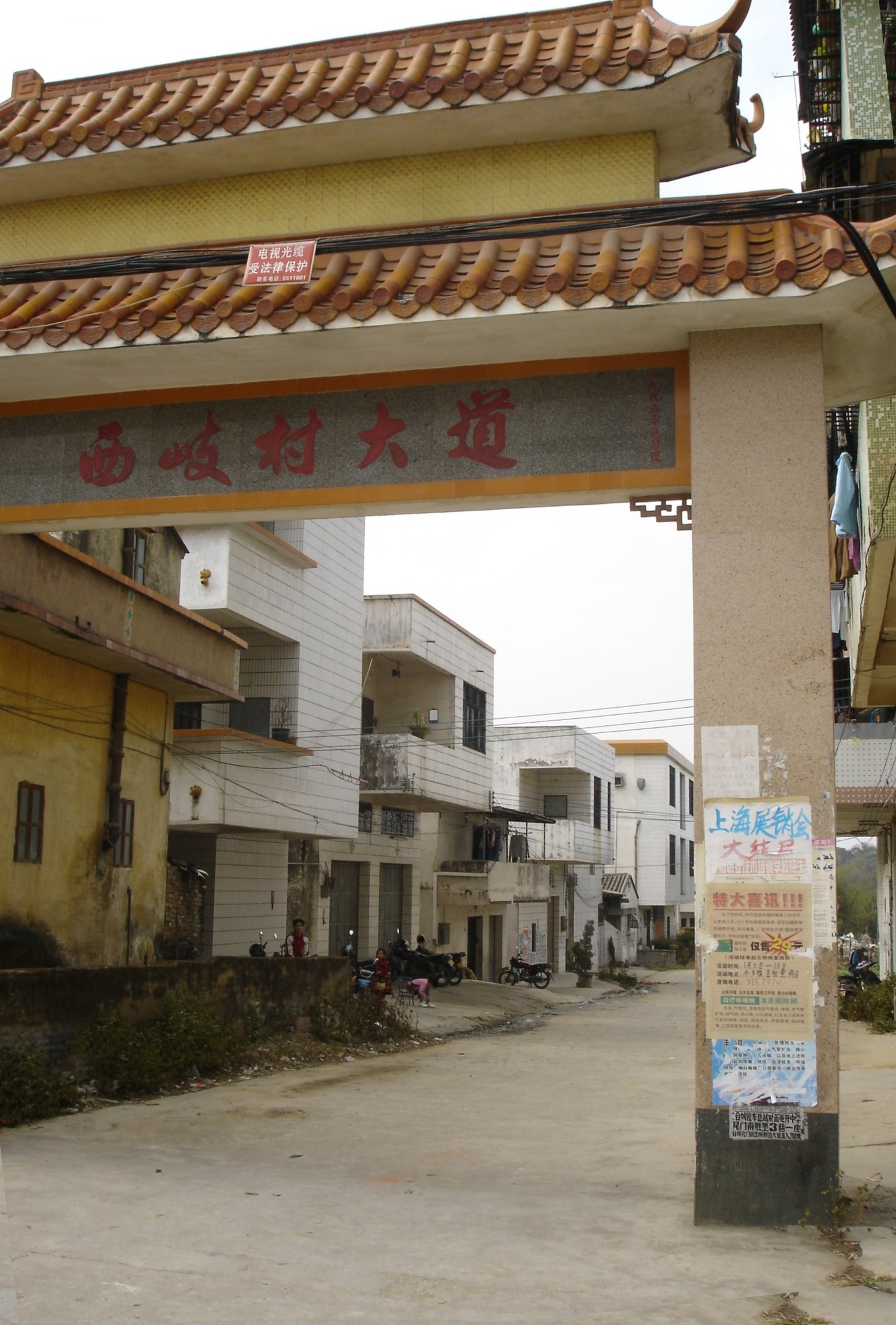
Xiqi village

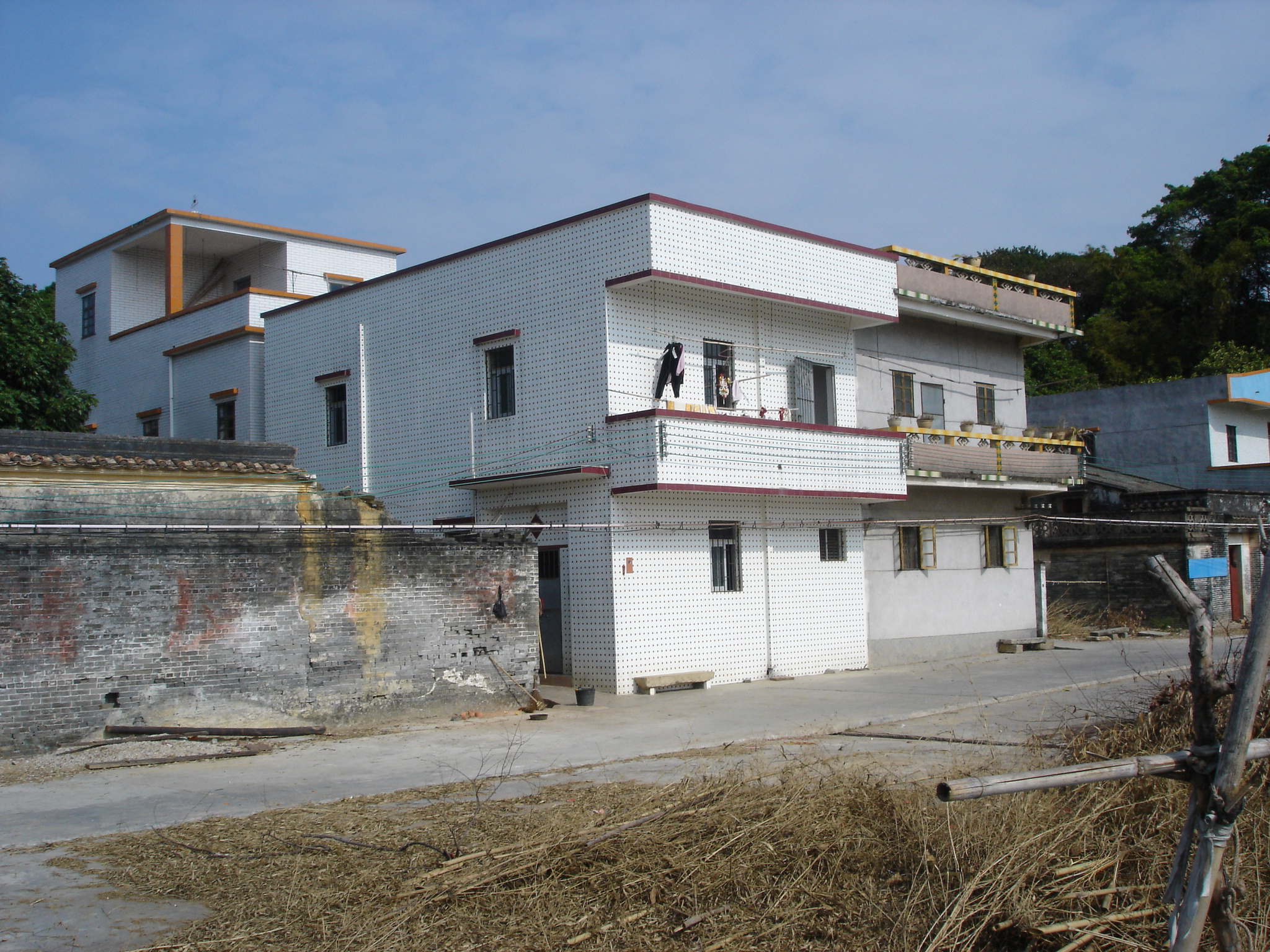
Xiqi village

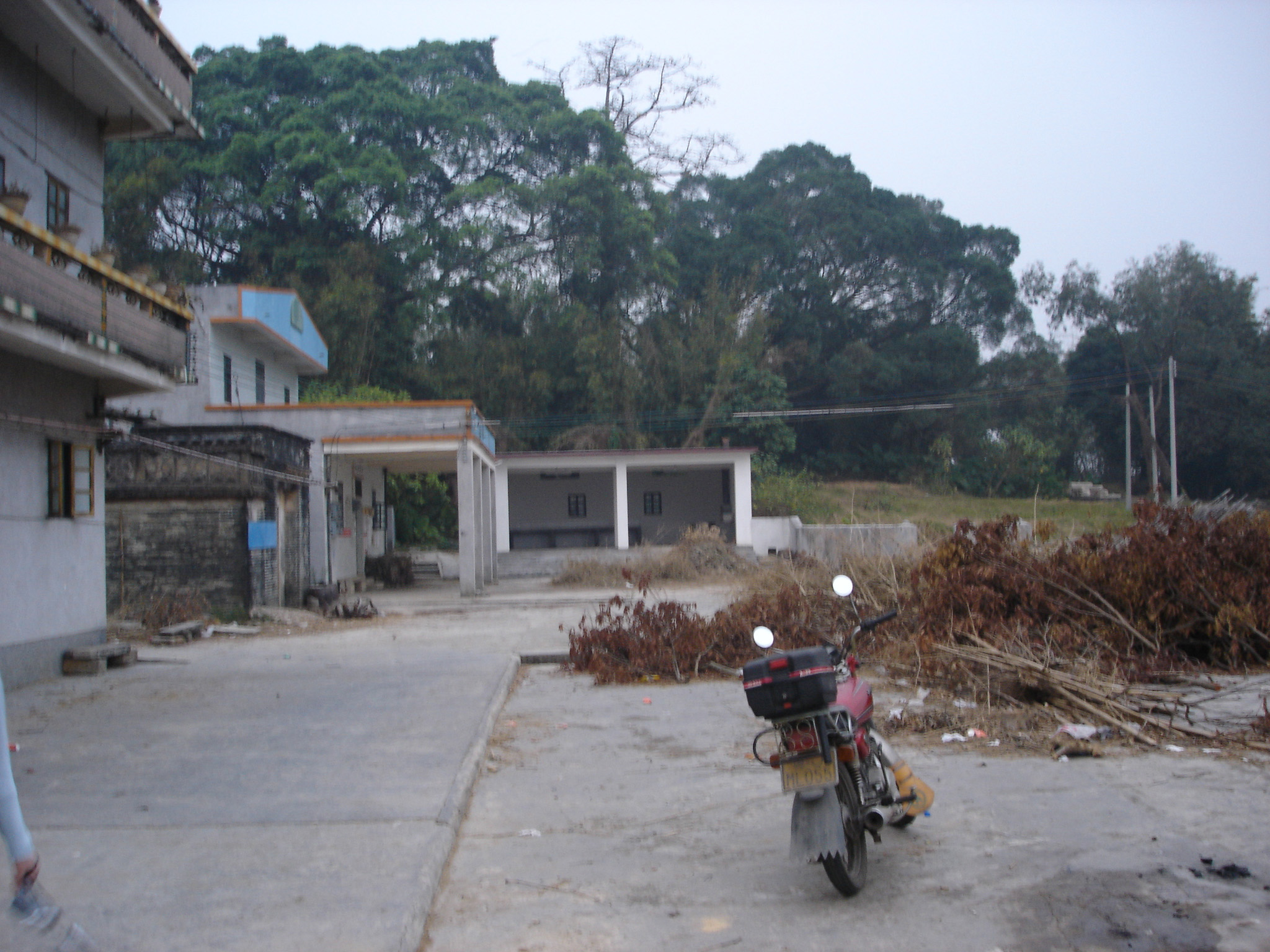
Xiqi front village

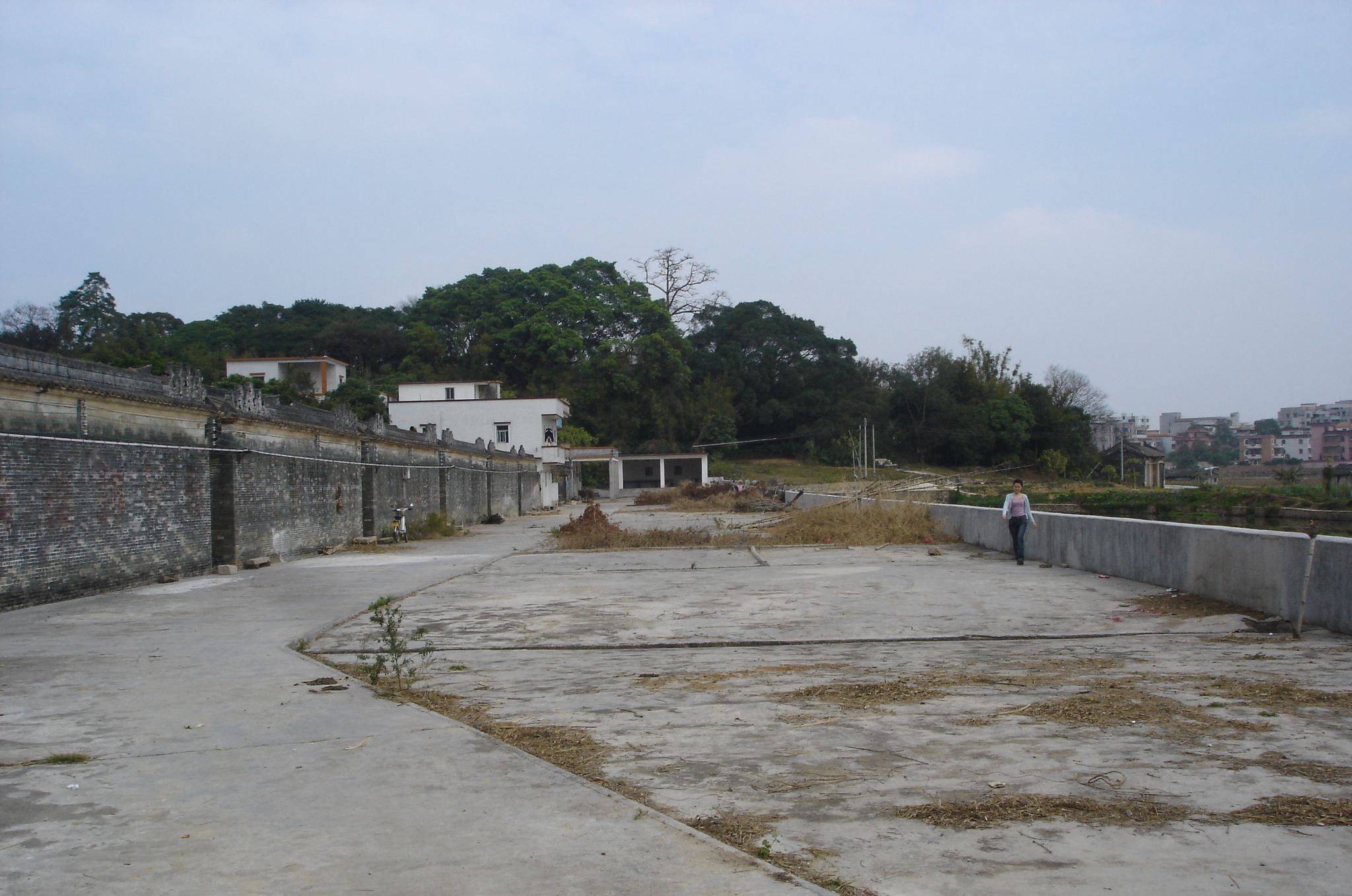
Xiqi village

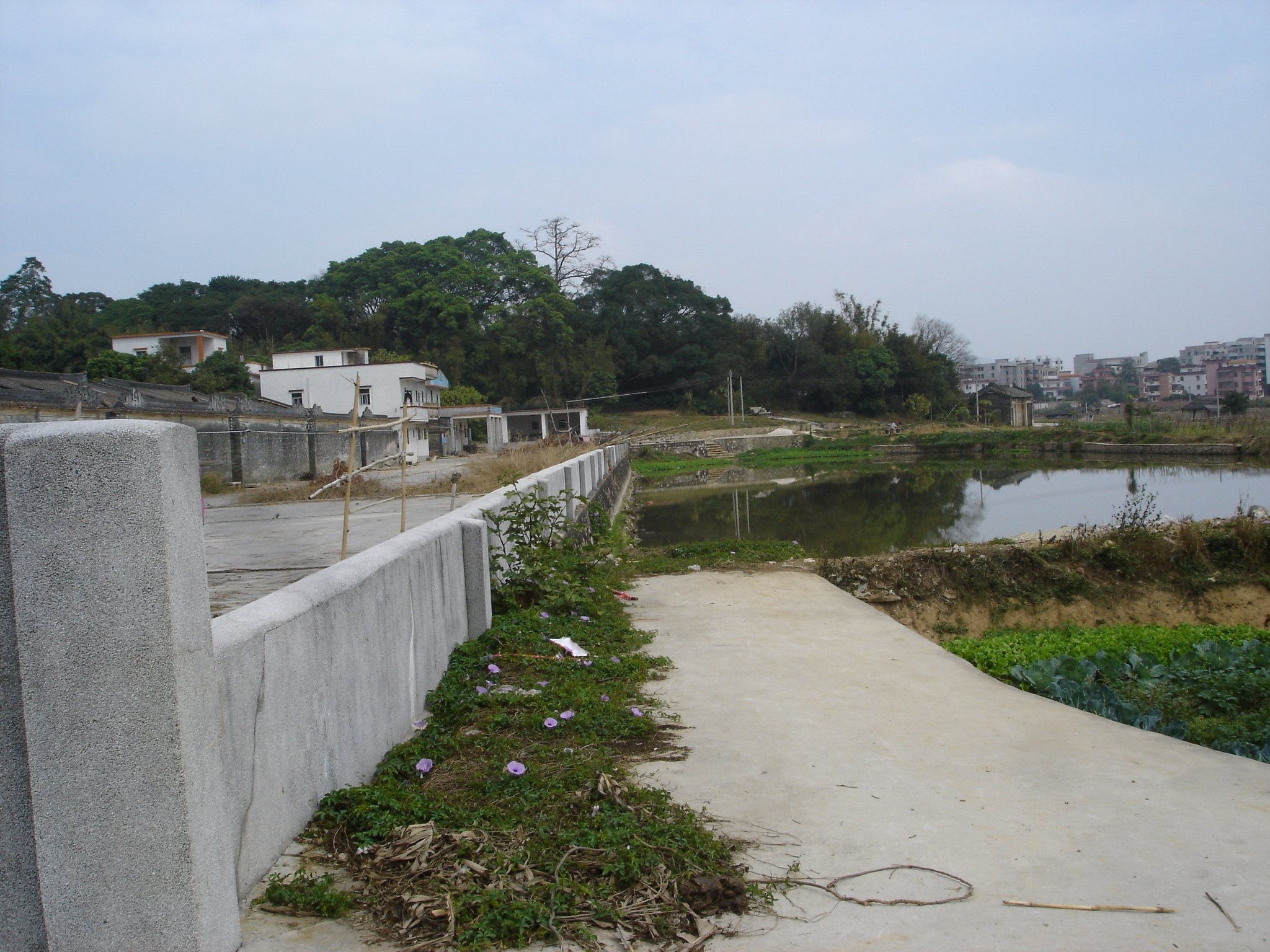
Xiqi village

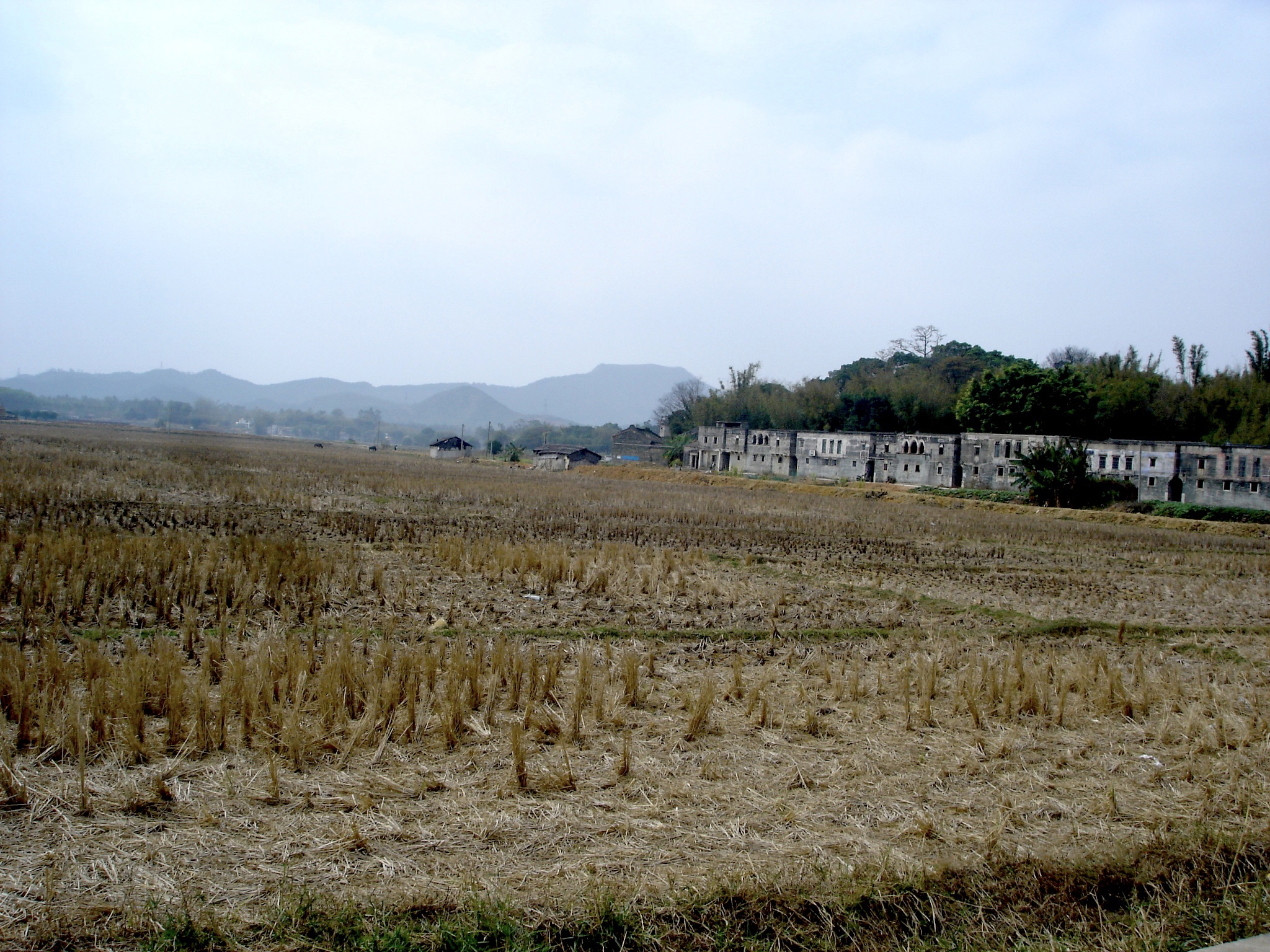
Xiqi village

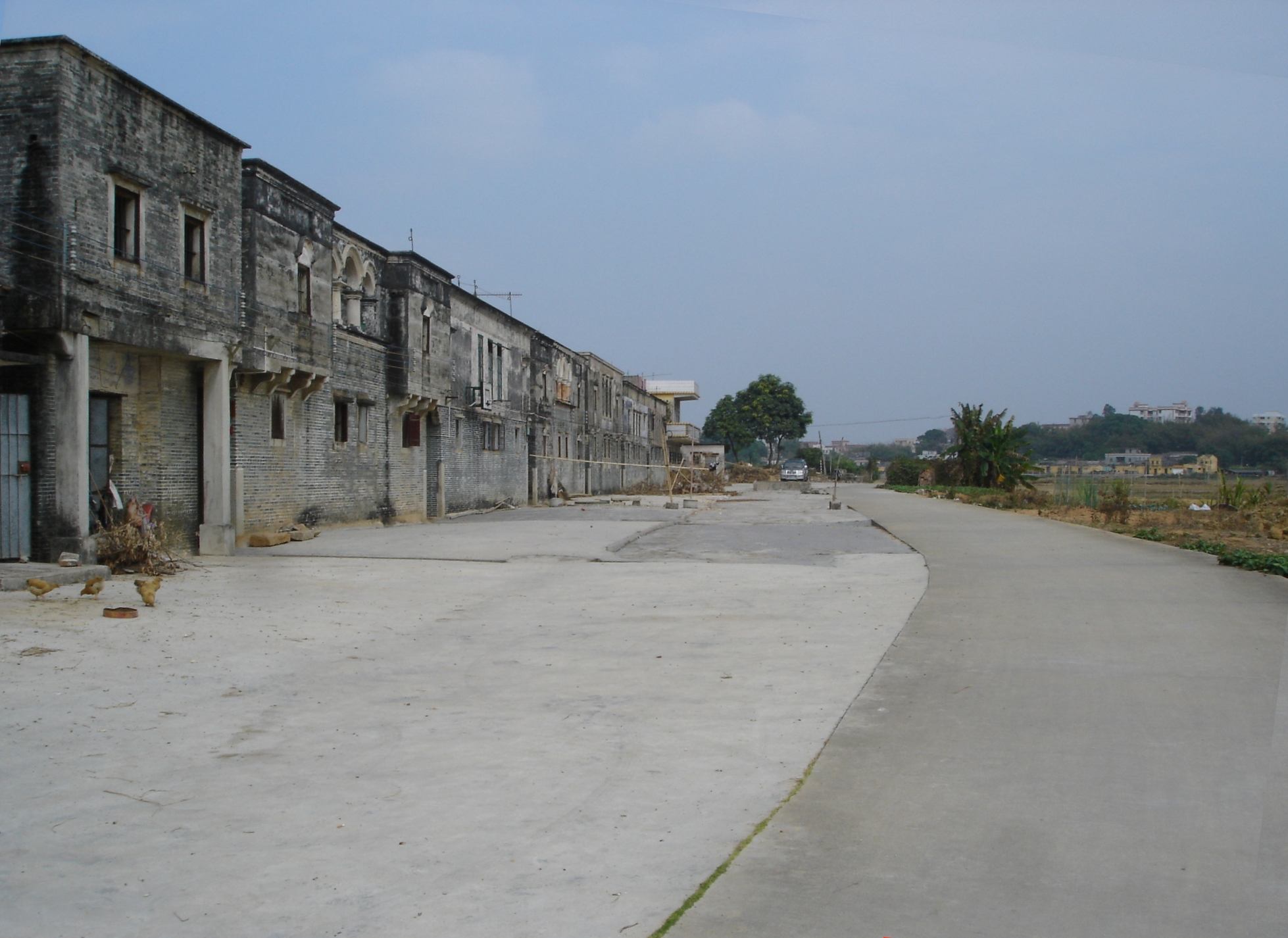
Xiqi village
