= Residential community =

Community composed mostly of residents

Chinese name
- Simplified Chinese: 社区
- Traditional Chinese: 社區
Transcriptions
Standard Mandarin
- Hanyu Pinyin: shèqū

Mongolian name
- Mongolian Cyrillic: хороолол
- Mongolian script: ᠬᠣᠷᠢᠶᠠᠯᠠᠯ
Transcriptions
- SASM/GNC: ꭓoriyalal

Uyghur name
- Uyghur: مەھەللە
Transcriptions
- Latin Yëziqi: mehelle

Kazakh name
- Kazakh: الەۋمەتتىك اۋماعى әлеуметтің аумағы äleumettıñ aumağy

Kyrgyz name
- Kyrgyz: قوومدۇق قونۇشۇ коомдук конушу qoomduq qonuşu

A residential community is a community, usually a small town or city, that is composed mostly of residents, as opposed to commercial businesses and/or industrial facilities, all three of which are considered to be the three main types of occupants of the typical community.

Residential communities are typically communities that help support more commercial or industrial communities with consumers and workers. That phenomenon is probably because some people prefer not to live in an urban or industrial area, but rather a suburban or rural setting. For that reason, they are also called dormitory towns, bedroom communities, or commuter towns.

An example of residential community would include a small town or city outside a larger city or a large town located near a smaller but more commercially- or industrially-centered town or city, for instance Taitou in Gaocun, Wuqing, and Tianjin, China.

== China ==
In the People's Republic of China, a community (社区), also called residential unit or residential quarter (小区) or neighbourhood (居民区) or residential community (居住区), is an urban residential area and its residents administrated by a subdistrict (街道办事处). Communities are generally organized around a territory consisting of 100 to 700 households.

=== History ===
The reform that created residential communities as local government in their current form was called shèqū (社区). Originally, these organizations consisted of participating citizens and chiefs, the latter ones being installed by the central governance. Shequ represented an attempt to restructure the relationship between state and urban community in China.

The social anthropologist Fei Xiaotong is considered the first to have proposed the introduction of the idea of shequ in China. The introduction of shequ started after the collapse of the previously existing social institutions (danwei) during the mid-1990s. Shequ were supposed to relieve the state of certain duties and responsibilities by transferring them to citizens participating in the shequ. They take over responsibilities which in democratic states are assumed by organisations of the civil community.

=== Local government ===
Each community has a community committee, neighborhood committee or residents' committee (社区居民委员会). The creation, adjustment or dissolution of a community committee is decided by the subdistrict government. A community committee is directly elected and consists of 5 to 9 members; it is responsible to the residents assembly, which consists of all residents in the community who are at or above the age of 18.

== See also ==
- Administrative divisions of China
- Age-restricted community
- Xiaoqu
