= Tianweiban =

Coordinates: 19.773771°N 110.681183°E

- Chinese: 田尾湴 (田梅洞)
Transcriptions
Standard Mandarin
- Hanyu Pinyin: Tiánwěibàn (Tiánméidòng)

Tianweiban, formerly known as Tianmeidong, is a village in Donglu Town, Wenchang County, Hainan, China with a population of roughly 50 people in 10 households.

== Name change ==
The inhabitants of Tianmeidong changed their village's name in 2007 on the advice of a feng shui master, in hopes that it would bring them prosperity. The villagers were not entirely clear on the meaning of the new name, only that the obscure final character was pronounced the same as "to bump (碰)" in their local dialect of Hainanese. The change began to cause inconvenience for the villagers because officials did not know how to enter the character into computers; villagers found themselves unable to obtain identity cards, marriage certificates, and other documents as a result.

The final character in the village name, which means "deep mud", is present in the Big5 standard commonly used for traditional Chinese characters, where it has the code D5E4, as well as in Unicode, where its code point is U+6E74. Although it is absent from GB 2312, an old character encoding standard used in the China, the newer character sets GBK and GB 18030, which supersede GB 2312, do contain the character, encoded as 9CB0. News reports in both China and Hong Kong referred to the character by describing its shape, rather than printing the actual character in question.
