= Fujiang Village =

Village in Quzhou, China

Coordinates: 28.54178°N 118.29288°E

Fujiang Village (Chinese: 伏江村), is a village in Tonggong Township, Changshan County, Quzhou, Zhejiang province, China.
