= Liangjiang =

Liangjiang may refer to:

- Viceroy of Liangjiang (兩江總督), regional viceroy of China during the Qing dynasty, consisting of Jiangnan and Jiangxi provinces

== Locations in China ==
- Liangjiang New Area (两江新区), Chongqing
- Guilin Liangjiang International Airport (桂林两江国际机场), the main airport serving Guilin, Guangxi
- Liangjiang Township (两江乡), Xupu County, Hunan

Towns

- Liangjiang, Laibin (良江镇), in Xingbin District, Laibin, Guangxi

Written as "两江镇":

- Liangjiang, Guangdong, subdivision of Lechang, Guangdong
- Liangjiang, Guilin, subdivision of Lingui District, Guilin, Guangxi
- Liangjiang, Nanning, subdivision of Wuming District, Guangxi
- Liangjiang, Jilin, subdivision of Antu County, Jilin

== See also ==
- Chongqing Liangjiang Athletic F.C.
