= Wangtan, Jiangsu =

Wangtan 王滩村
- Village
- Location in Jiangsu
- Coordinates: 33°28′49″N 118°24′54″E
- Country: People's Republic of China
- Province: Jiangsu
- Prefecture-level city: Suqian
- County: Sihong County
- Town: Jieji

Wangtan (simplified Chinese: 王滩; traditional Chinese: 王灘; pinyin: Wángtān) is a village in Jieji (界集镇), Sihong County, in the northwest of Jiangsu province, China approximately 57 kilometres (35 mi) west of the city of Huai'an.
