= Wangtang, Lingchuan County =

Wangtang 旺塘村
- Village
- Location in Guangxi
- Coordinates: 25°06′36″N 110°29′18″E
- Country: People's Republic of China
- Autonomous region: Guangxi
- Prefecture-level city: Guilin
- County: Lingchuan
- Township: Chaotian

Wangtang (Chinese: 旺塘村; pinyin: Wàngtáng Cūn) is a village in Chaotian Township (潮田乡), Lingchuan County, Guilin, Guangxi in the People's Republic of China, about 25 km southeast of Guilin. In 2009, the Guilin city government provided aid to the village, and described it as hilly, relatively high altitude, and prone to water shortages. The elementary school in Wangtang was lacking in funding, and more than 280 students were forced to use old, hard desks as a result.
