= Shangfeng, Henan =

Shangfeng 上冯村
- Village
- Location in Henan
- Coordinates: 32°59′13.5″N 113°20′08.1″E
- Country: People's Republic of China
- Province: Henan
- Prefecture-level city: Zhumadian
- County: Biyang
- Town: Yangce

Shangfeng (simplified Chinese: 上冯村; traditional Chinese: 上馮村; pinyin: Shàngféng Cūn) is a village in Yangce (羊册镇), Biyang County, Zhumadian, Henan province, China 7 km (4.3 mi) east of the town of Yangce, which it geographically is part of. It has over 1000 residents, and is surrounded on three sides by mountains. Locals primarily rely on agriculture, mainly growing wheat, soybean, sesame, and peanuts. Cattle and goats are also raised in the area.
