= Taitou, Gaocun =

Residential community in Tianjin, China

Taitou Xinyuan 台头新苑社区
- Residential community
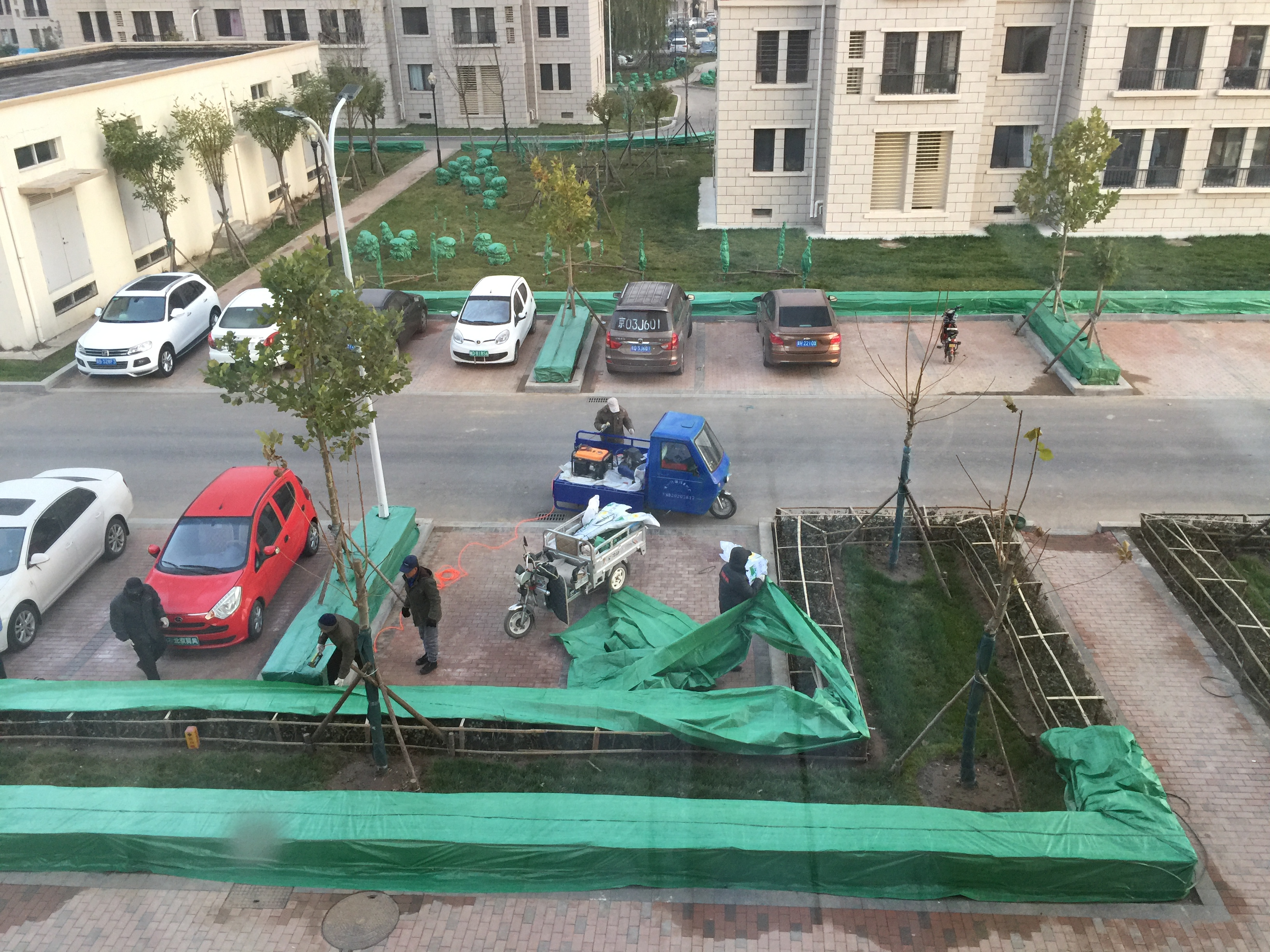
- Interactive map of Taitou Xinyuan
- Coordinates: 39°38′03″N 116°51′14″E
- Country: People's Republic of China
- Municipality: Tianjin
- District: Wuqing
- Town: Gaocun
- Elevation: 12 m (39 ft)

Population (August 2018)
  - Total: 1,000
- Includes around 30 expatriates
- Time zone: UTC+8 (China Standard)
- Postal code: 301700

Taitou (simplified Chinese: 台头新苑社区; traditional Chinese: 臺頭新苑社區; pinyin: Táitóu Xīnyuàn Shèqū, formerly simplified Chinese: 台头村; traditional Chinese: 臺頭村; pinyin: Táitóu Cūn) is a newly built village in Gaocun township, Wuqing District, Tianjin.

== Location ==
Located just two kilometres from the Gaocun exit of the Jingjintang Expressway, Taitou offers excellent transportation links to Beijing and Tianjin.

Taitou is a vibrant community of relocated farmers surrounded by agricultural land and thousands of vacant new buildings. Many of the empty buildings in the surrounding area were constructed during a speculative real estate bubble in the early 2010s. While occupancy rates in Taitou are very high, occupancy rates of housing and shopping malls in the surrounding area are still extremely low. The surrounding area could be described as a Chinese ghost city.

In late 2018, house prices dropped from 15,384 Chinese yuan per square metre to 11,771 Chinese yuan per square metre in just two months.

== Commercial activity ==
=== Within Taitou residential compound ===
- Spa, building 2
- Skincare products, building 7
- Printing and photocopying, building 10
- Sauna, spa and massage parlour, building 13
- Hairdresser, building 17

=== In Taitou building 21 (commercial space) ===
- Medical clinic (basic supplies and limited opening hours)
- China Post
- Agricultural Bank of China
- Broadband service centre

=== Outside Taitou North Gate ===
- various commercial ventures

For safety reasons, no cars are permitted to enter this gate. Pedestrians, bicycles (including electric bikes) and electric rickshaws are allowed.

=== Outside Taitou West Gate ===
- Guard sentry
- Intercity bus stop

=== Around Taitou ===
- Crematorium
- Work yard with agricultural equipment and farm animals
- Road corn

=== Wisdom Plaza ===
- Beijing Institute of Big Data Research
- other commercial ventures

== Map ==
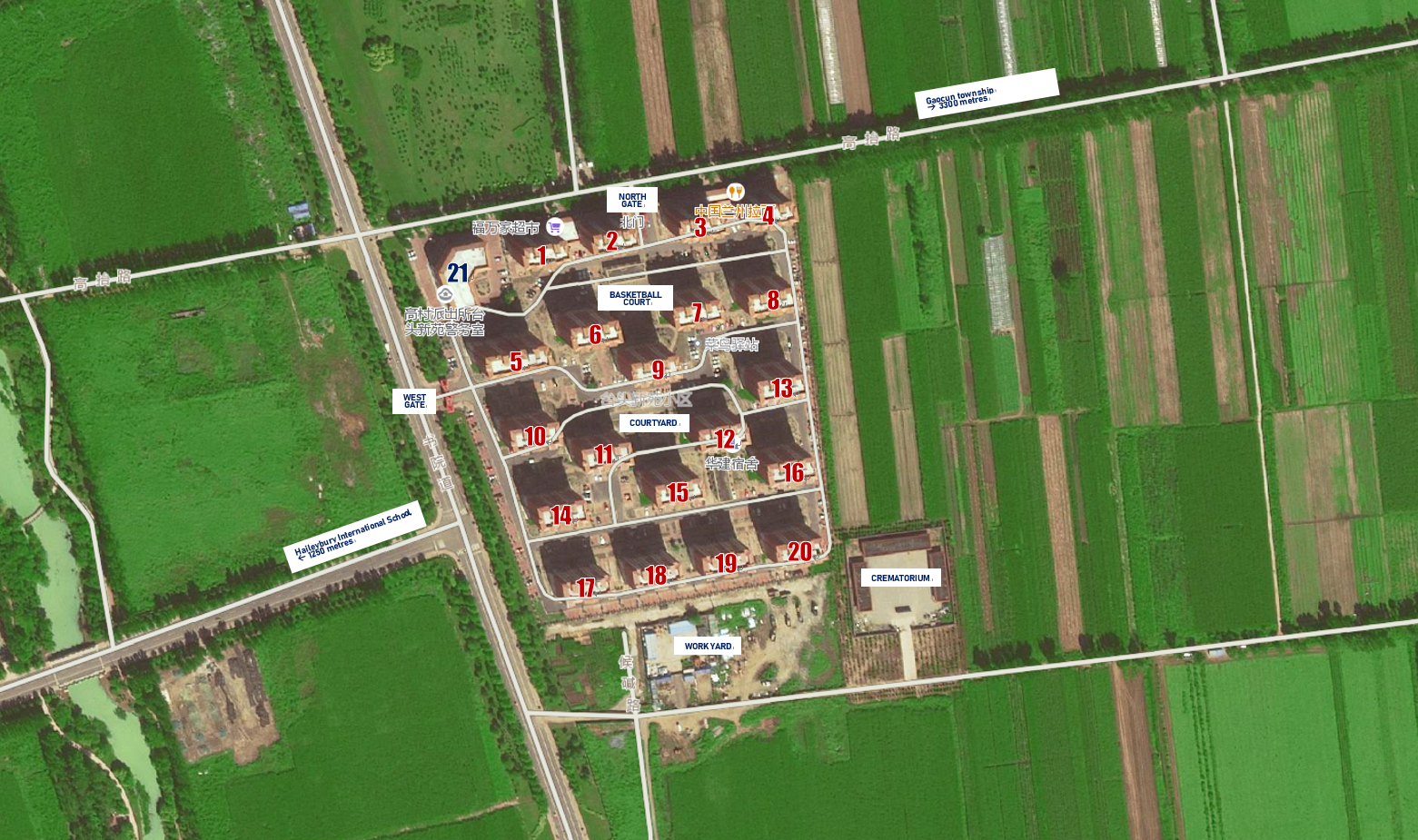
Annotated map of Taitou residential compound

== Air quality ==
The air quality as measured by the air quality index (AQI) in nearby Langfang varies from excellent to severely polluted. In summer months, the AQI is usually around 100, while in winter months, AQI of 300+ is common. In May 2017, the AQI of Langfang and other cities in the Jingjinji area exceeded an extremely hazardous 1000 points.

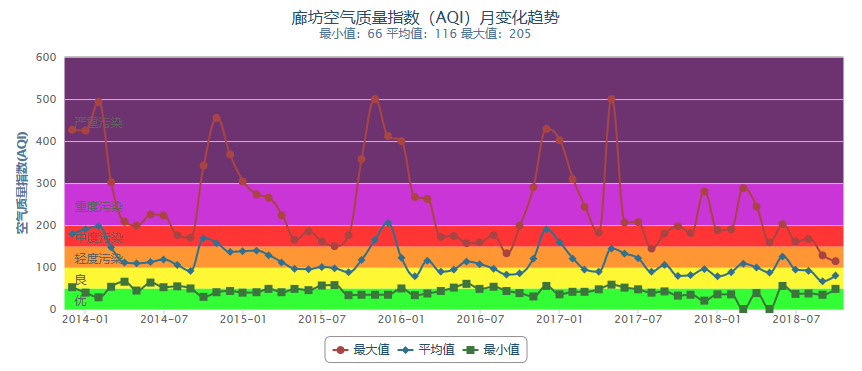
Green: lowest AQI each month; blue: average AQI each month; maroon: highest AQI each month. Higher numbers indicate more polluted air.

The lack of an extremely polluted winter in 2017/18 is owed to policies from the central Chinese government that placed severe restrictions on heavily-polluting manufacturing plants and coal furnaces used for heating.

== Renovation process of 2016-17 ==
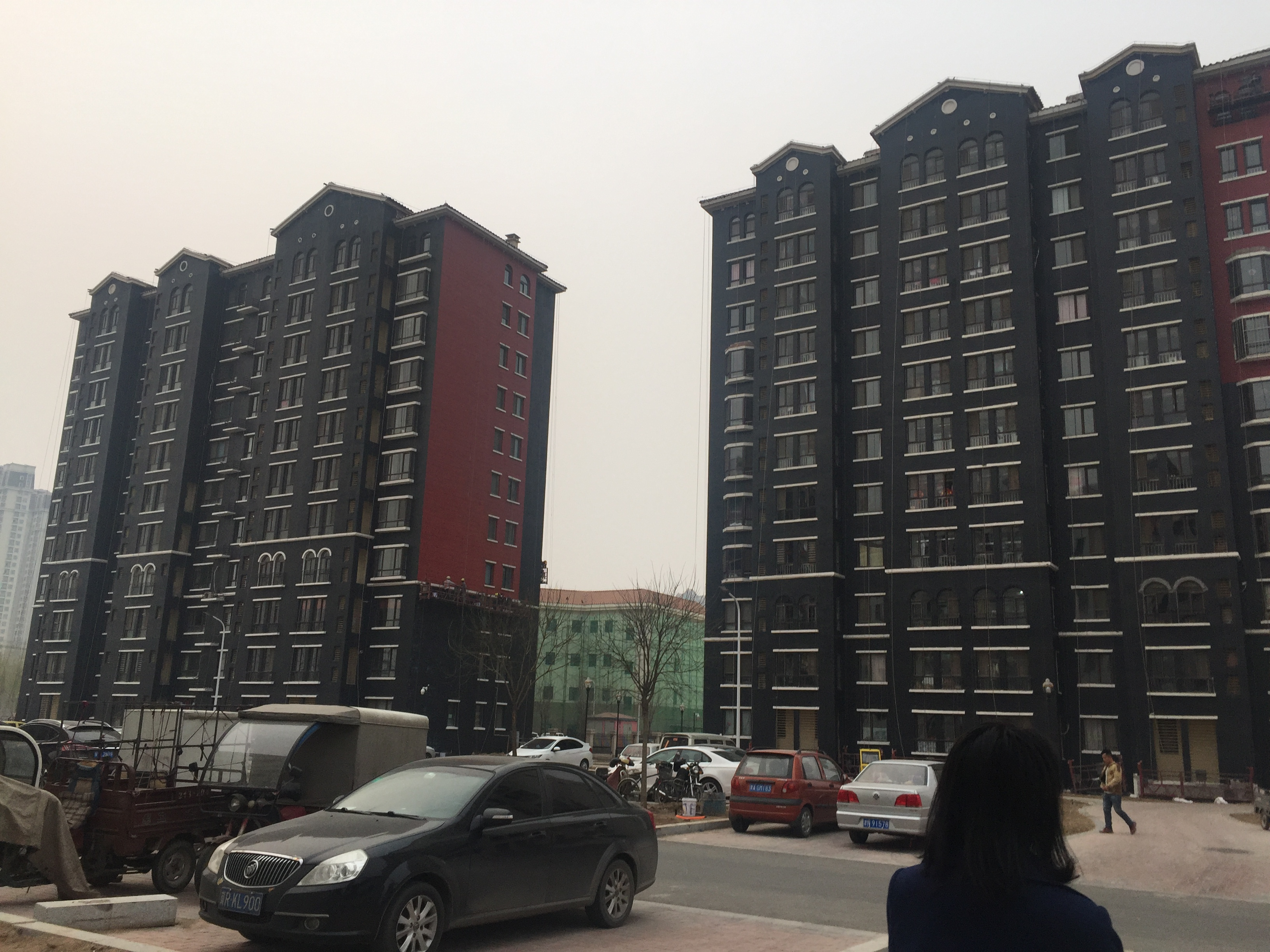
Black waterproof layer has been applied to the exterior walls of all 21 buildings at Taitou residential compound. Walls are now ready for stencilling with masking tape and beige paint.

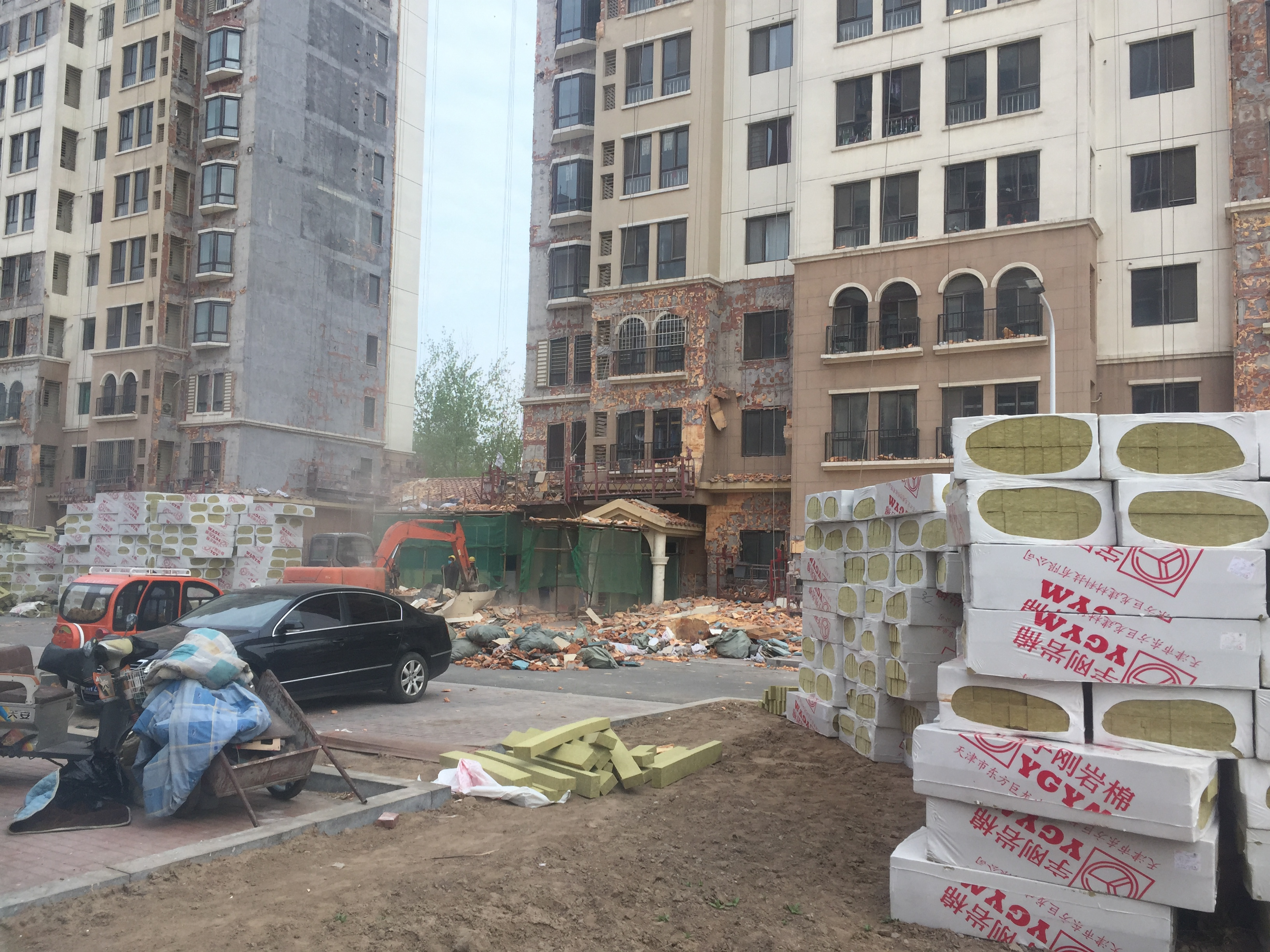
Major renovation works were carried out at Taitou residential compound from 2016-17

Shortly after construction of the Taitou residential compound was completed, and after residents had moved in, major renovation works were carried out on the exterior walls of all 21 buildings at Taitou.

The process included:

1. Chipping away the existing stone cladding
2. Removing the old Rockwool insulation material from the external walls
3. Installing new, upgraded Rockwool insulation material to the external walls
4. Painting the exterior walls white
5. Painting the exterior walls black
6. Covering every face of every building with masking tape in a brickwork pattern
7. Painting the buildings beige then peeling off the masking tape to reveal a brickwork pattern

The exterior wall renovation process took nearly 12 months to complete, during which, the compound was littered with dust, rubble and debris. After the exterior wall insulation was finished, workers planted hundreds of trees and bushes around the residential compound.

Haileybury International School used some of the Taitou debris as material for its elective handicraft activity.

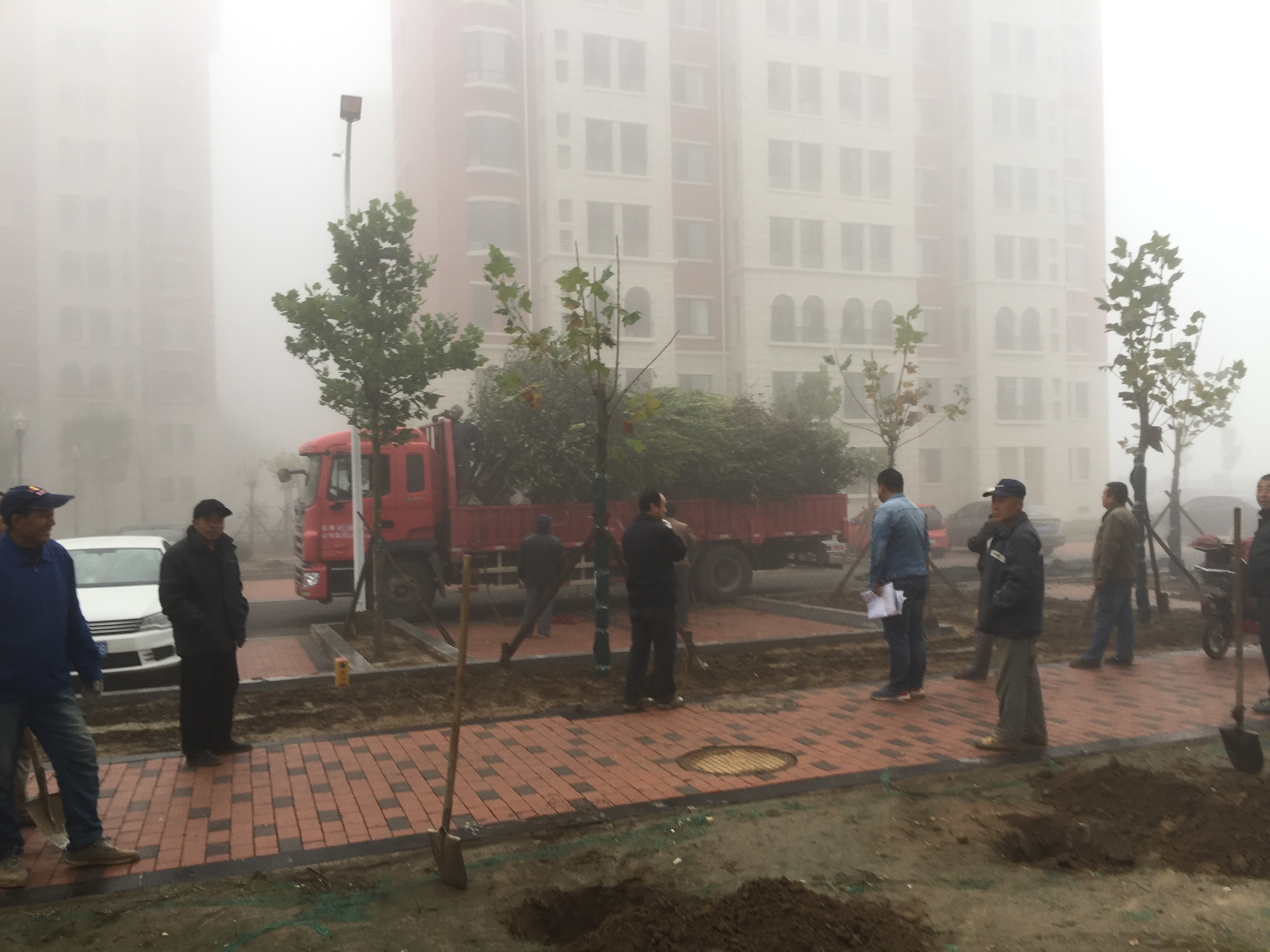
Trees being planted around Taitou residential compound after the completion of renovation works in 2017
