= Qingtian Hall =

Hall in Jinhu, Kinmen, Taiwan

- 擎天廳
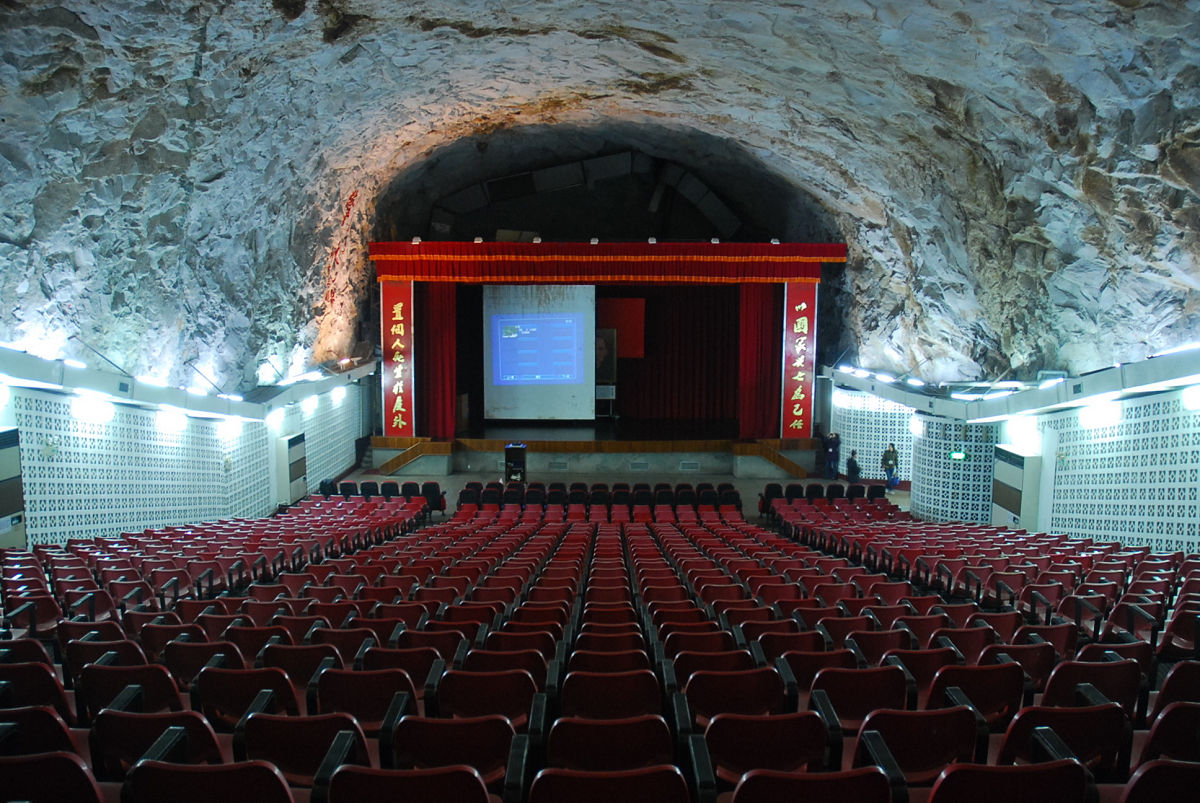
- Interactive map of the Qingtian Hall area

General information
- Type: hall
- Location: Jinhu, Kinmen, Taiwan
- Coordinates: 24°27′15.18″N 118°24′25.91″E
- Completed: 1962

Height
- Height: 11 m (36 ft)

The Qingtian Hall (traditional Chinese: 擎天廳; simplified Chinese: 擎天厅; pinyin: Qíngtiān Tīng) is a hall in Jinhu Township, Kinmen County, Taiwan.

== History ==
The hall was originally constructed in 1962 after the Second Taiwan Strait Crisis in 1958 as a place for the stations and posts of the Republic of China Armed Forces and medical shelter. The hall was created by using dynamite.

== Geology ==
The hall is located at the hillside of Mount Taiwu.

== Architecture ==
The hall spans over 50 meters long, 18 meters wide and 11 meters high. The hall is connected with other tunnels.

== See also ==
- List of tourist attractions in Taiwan
