= Yu Da Wei Xian Sheng Memorial Museum =

Museum in Jinhu, Kinmen, Taiwan

- 俞大維先生紀念館
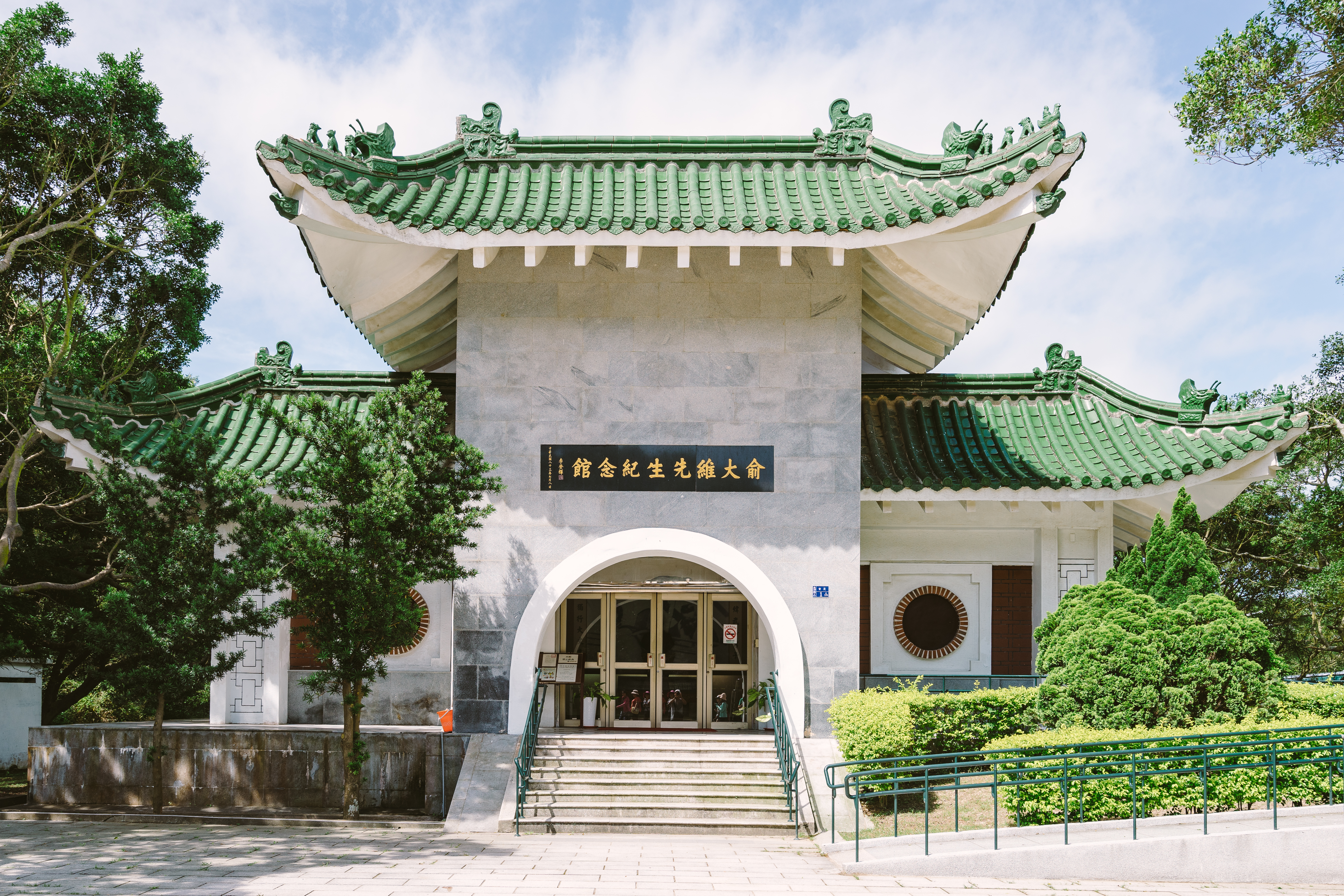
- Location: Jinhu, Kinmen, Taiwan
- Coordinates: 24°26′35″N 118°25′54″E
- Type: museum

The Yu Da Wei Xian Sheng Memorial Museum (traditional Chinese: 俞大維先生紀念館; simplified Chinese: 俞大维先生纪念馆; pinyin: Yúdàwéi Xiānshēng Jìniànguǎn) is a war memorial museum in Zhongzheng Park, Jinhu Township, Kinmen County, Taiwan.

== Architecture ==
The museum building was constructed with grey bricks and green roof tiles.

== Exhibitions ==
The museum exhibits artifacts from Yu during the Second Taiwan Strait Crisis.

== See also ==
- List of museums in Taiwan
