= Zhongzheng Park =

Zhongzheng Park may refer to:

- Zhongzheng Park (Keelung), in Keelung, Taiwan
- Zhongzheng Park (Kinmen), in Kinmen, Taiwan
- Zhongzheng Park (Daxi), in Daxi District, Taoyuan, Taiwan
