= Dongding Island =

Island west of Taiwan

Coordinates: 24°9′6″N 118°13′48″E

Native name: 東碇島 / 東椗島
- Interactive map of Dongding Island

Geography
- Location: In the Taiwan Strait, Jinhu Township, Kinmen County (Quemoy), Fujian, Republic of China (Taiwan)
- Area: 0.0160 km^{2} (0.0062 sq mi)

Administration
- Republic of China (Taiwan)
- Province: Fujian
- County: Kinmen (Quemoy)
- Urban Township: Jinhu

Additional information
- Time zone: National Standard Time (UTC+8)

Location of Dongding Island

Dongding Island (Chinese: 東碇島 / 東椗島; pinyin: Dōngdìng Dǎo; Pe̍h-ōe-jī: Tang-tiāⁿ) is a 0.0160 square kilometer island in the Taiwan Strait in Jinhu Township, Kinmen County (Quemoy), Fujian Province, Republic of China (Taiwan). The island is the southernmost point of Kinmen County. It is located near Longhai City, Zhangzhou, Fujian, China.

== Name ==
Dongding Island has been known by a variety of names including: Dongding, Tangtia, Tungting Tao, Tungting Hsu, Chapel Island, Tung Ting Island, Dong Ding, Tung-Ting, Tung-ting-seu, Tungting Island, Dongding Islet, Dongdingdao, Dongdingdao Island, and Tung-ting Tao.

== History ==
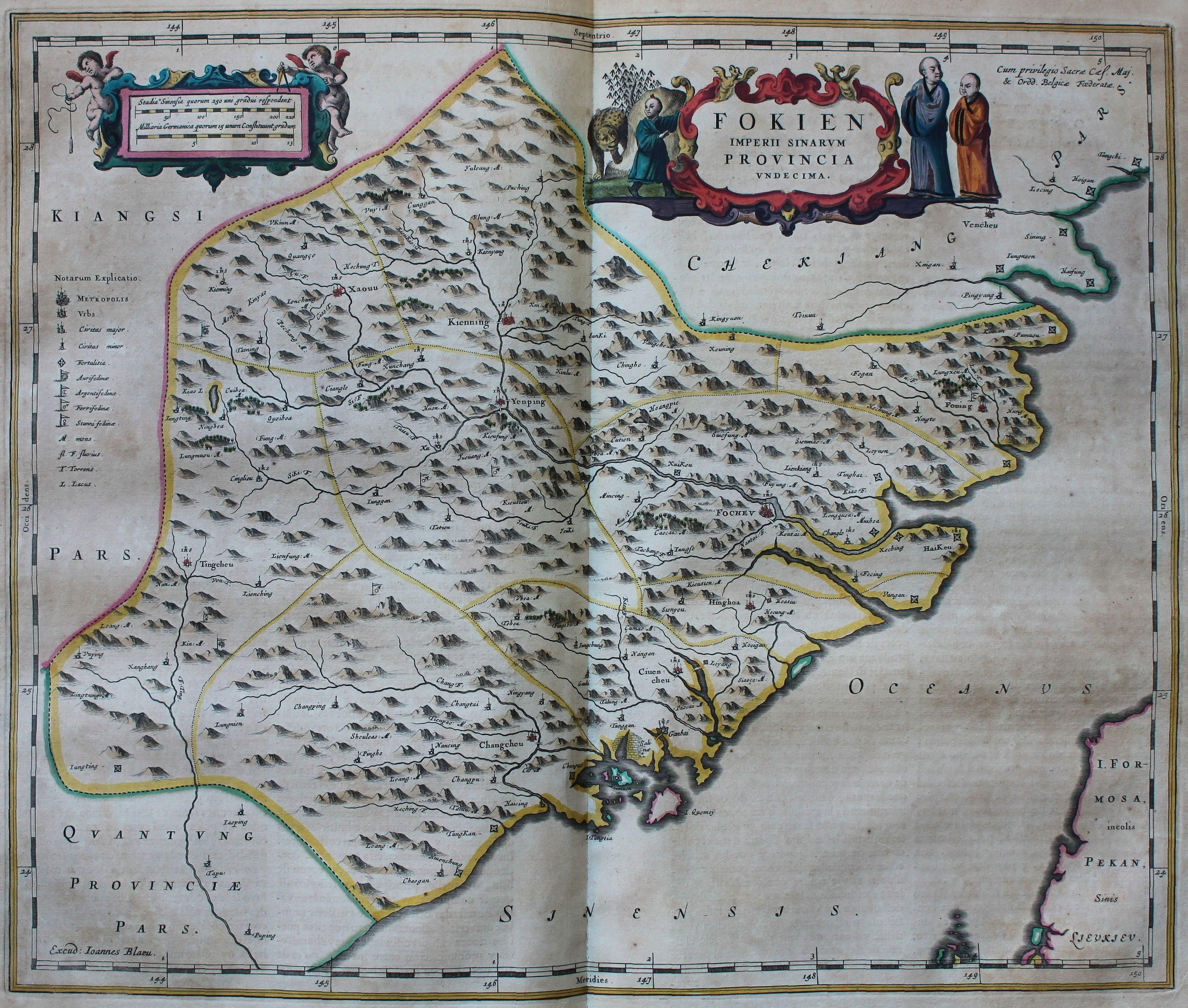
I. Tangtia (colored pink) on a map of Fujian (1600s)

The island's mountains were sighted during the Ming treasure voyages on the evening of June 26, 1433.

In January 1867, Sir Robert Hart, 1st Baronet wrote, "It is proposed to put a Light on Chapel Island, the sea mark for vessels bound to Amoy. This light will also be useful to casting vessels generally, as it will remind them of the proximity of the Meriope shoal."

According to a plaque affixed to the lighthouse, the lighthouse was designed by David Marr Henderson (韓得善) and built by A. M. Bisbee in 1871. The lighthouse is round and painted black. The lighthouse was referred to as the Chapel Island Light. In good weather, the light was expected to be visible from twenty-two miles away. The lighthouse was renovated in 1913 and 1927.

In September 1954, it was noted in top secret American intelligence documents declassified in August 2000 that Nationalist guerrillas from Quemoy had gone to Tungting Island.

When an American journalist visited the island in the early 1950s, the Nationalists kept the light dark so that it would be difficult for ships to enter enemy ports. The lighthouse's color was white at that time. During this period, officers on duty on the island were ideally supposed to be rotated out every six months and guerrillas every two months with supply ship visits once a week. These periodic visits and changes were often delayed by weather and enemy activity. Fifty men were stationed on the island at that time under the command of Captain Chang Yi Ming. According to Captain Chang, attempted landings on the island by communist forces had been fended off by throwing grenades over the cliff.

On August 24 and 25, 1958 during the Second Taiwan Strait Crisis, Chinese Communist and Chinese Nationalist forces clashed in the vicinity of the island. The action was seen as an attempt by the communists to land on the island. The action has also been seen as an attempt to draw Nationalist forces away from other areas.

(...) on the 24th two night naval engagements took place near Quemoy. The clashes resulted from a Chinese Communist attempt at landing on the small island of Tung-Ting in the Quemoy complex. The first attack involved four Chinese Communist gunboats and six small landing craft while the second involved five Chinese Communist gunboats and thirty motorized junks. According to the GRC Ministry of National Defense, several enemy ships were sunk and the attack was driven off by seven Chinese Nationalist Patrol craft. The GRC lost one LSM (landing craft, mechanized) and had one LST (landing ship, tank) damaged. Prior to September 3, when they were advised of U. S. escort plans, the Nationalists made five attempts to land an LST with troop replacements and several ships. These efforts were turned back by Chinese Communist PT boats and artillery fire.

In September 1958, the island was included in an official statement on the delineation of the territorial waters of China.

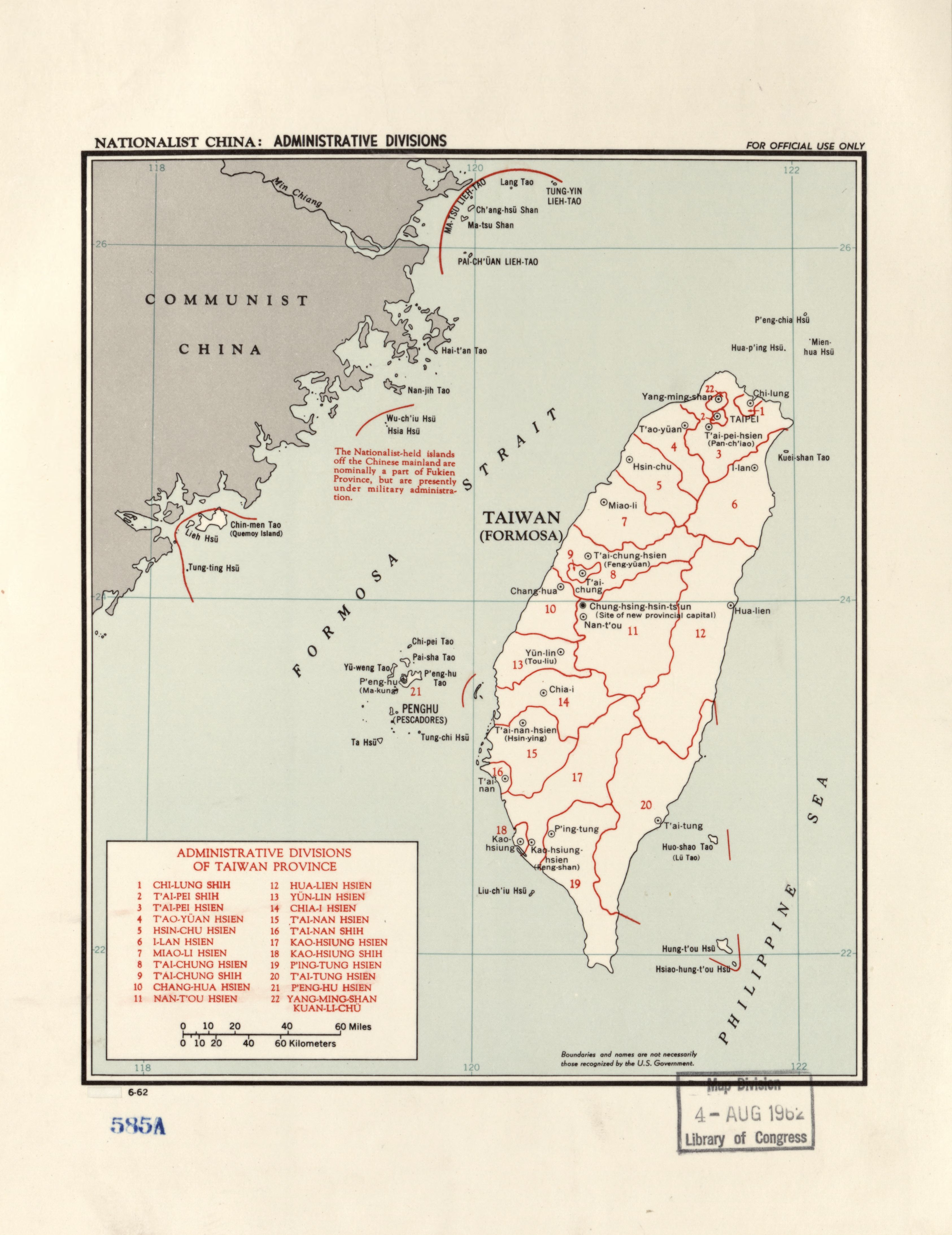
Tung-ting Hsü (Dongding Island) "The Nationalist-held islands off the Chinese mainland are nominally a part of Fukien Province, but are presently under military administration." (1962)

The lighthouse was repaired in 1964 after being damaged by artillery bombardment from the mainland.

In 1968, Chen Ching-Hu (陳慶虎), then 17, was given the job of lighthouse keeper on the island. Later, he would go back and forth between Dongding Island and Beiding Island maintaining the lighthouses at both places. He retired in 2016 at age 65 and lives on Kinmen Island.

On September 8, 1978, a butchers group from Jinhu visited Dongding Island and Beiding Island to bring gifts to the soldiers there. They wished the soldiers a happy upcoming Mid-Autumn Festival.

In March 1996, during the Third Taiwan Strait Crisis, Dongding Island was assessed as one of the targets of the CPLA's military harassment or seizure.

In May 1996, Dongding Island was included as a basepoint in the Baselines of the Chinese territorial sea.

In 2005, after being completely off-limits to civilians for five decades, the island was to be transferred from military control to the administration of Kinmen County government.

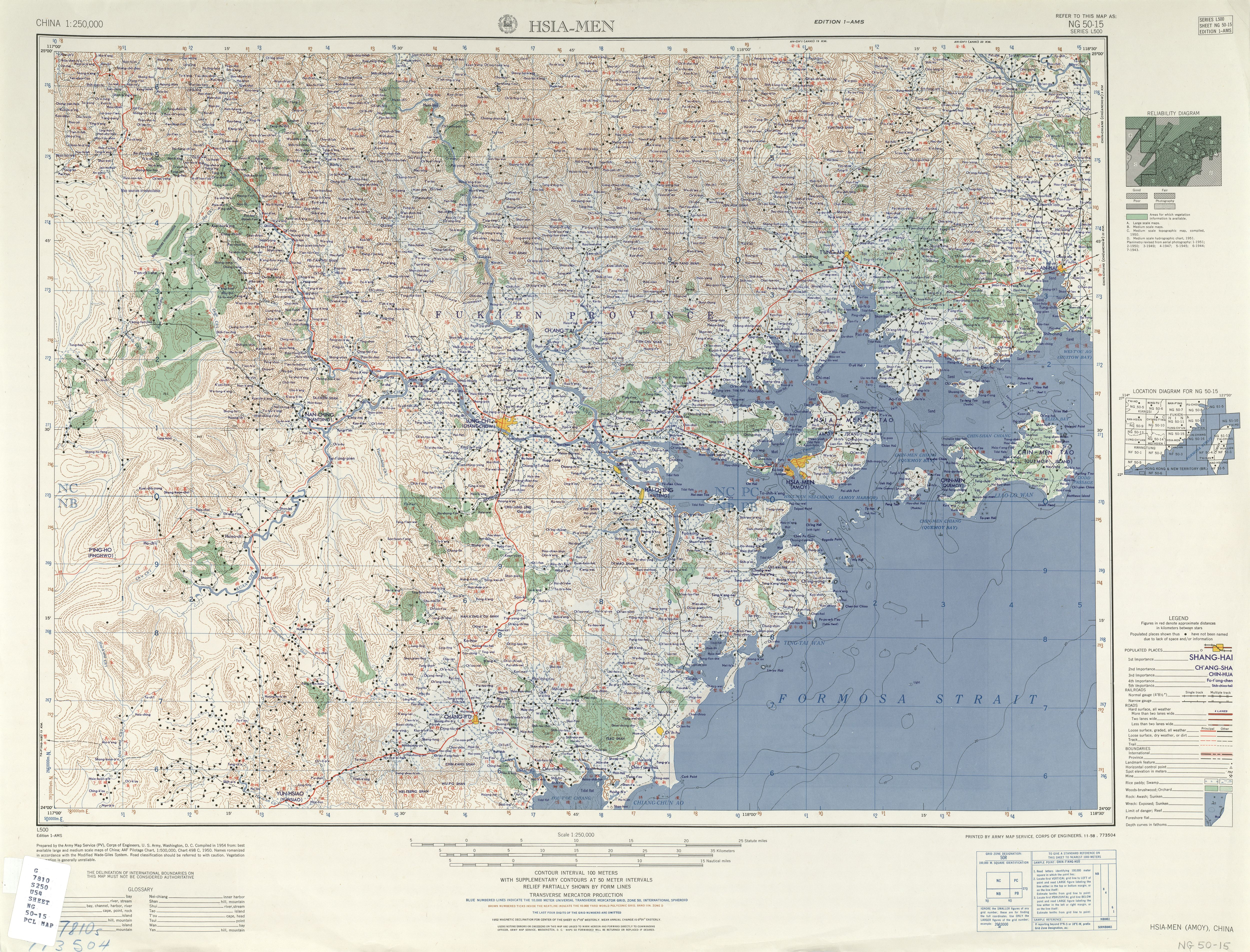
Map including the lighthouse on Dongding Island (labeled as 'Light') (AMS, 1954)

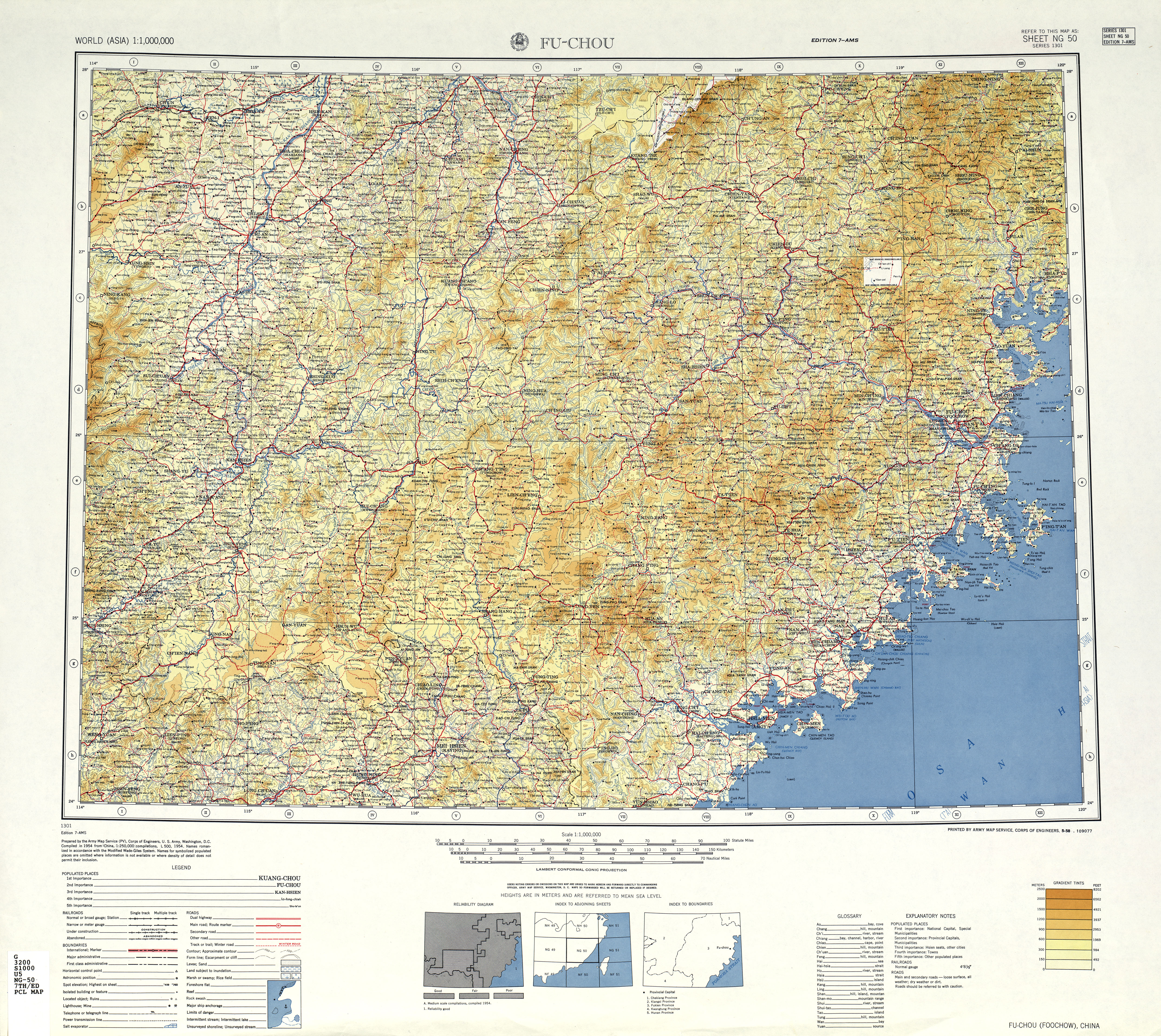
Map including the lighthouse on Dongding Island (labeled as (LIGHT)) (AMS, 1954)

On June 10, 2013, Pan Chia-Yu (潘家宇), the leader of the ROC Kinmen Defense Command, visited the soldiers on Dongding Island ahead of Dragon Boat Festival.

On July 18, 2019, Ho Cheng (賀政), the new leader of the ROC Army Kinmen Defense Command (陸軍金門防衛指揮部), visited the soldiers on Dongding Island.

On the night of May 24, 2020, Chinese sand mining ship Haishunda 069 (海順達069號) overturned and sank in or near the restricted waters south of Dongding Island.

== Geography ==
Dongding Island is about 13 km (8.1 mi) off the mainland coast and 25 km (16 mi) south-southwest of Kinmen.

The island has been described as "a bare rock, miles from any land". It is 55 meters high with steep cliffs. The top of the island is grassy. The south end of the island is linked to the rest of the island by a small strip of land. Nearby shipwrecks are unmarked and treacherous to navigation.

There are no trees, and sheer cliffs surround the island. There were rabbits on the island in the early 1950s. A zig-zagging stairway leads from a small concrete jetty to the summit area. The island has machine gun nests and rifle pits. There is a courtyard next to the lighthouse and old light-keeper's house. There is a basketball court and there are buildings that were built for the soldiers.

The Dongding Island Lighthouse is the westernmost lighthouse in Taiwan (ROC).

== See also ==
- List of islands of Taiwan
