= Ju County =

Ju County 莒县
- County
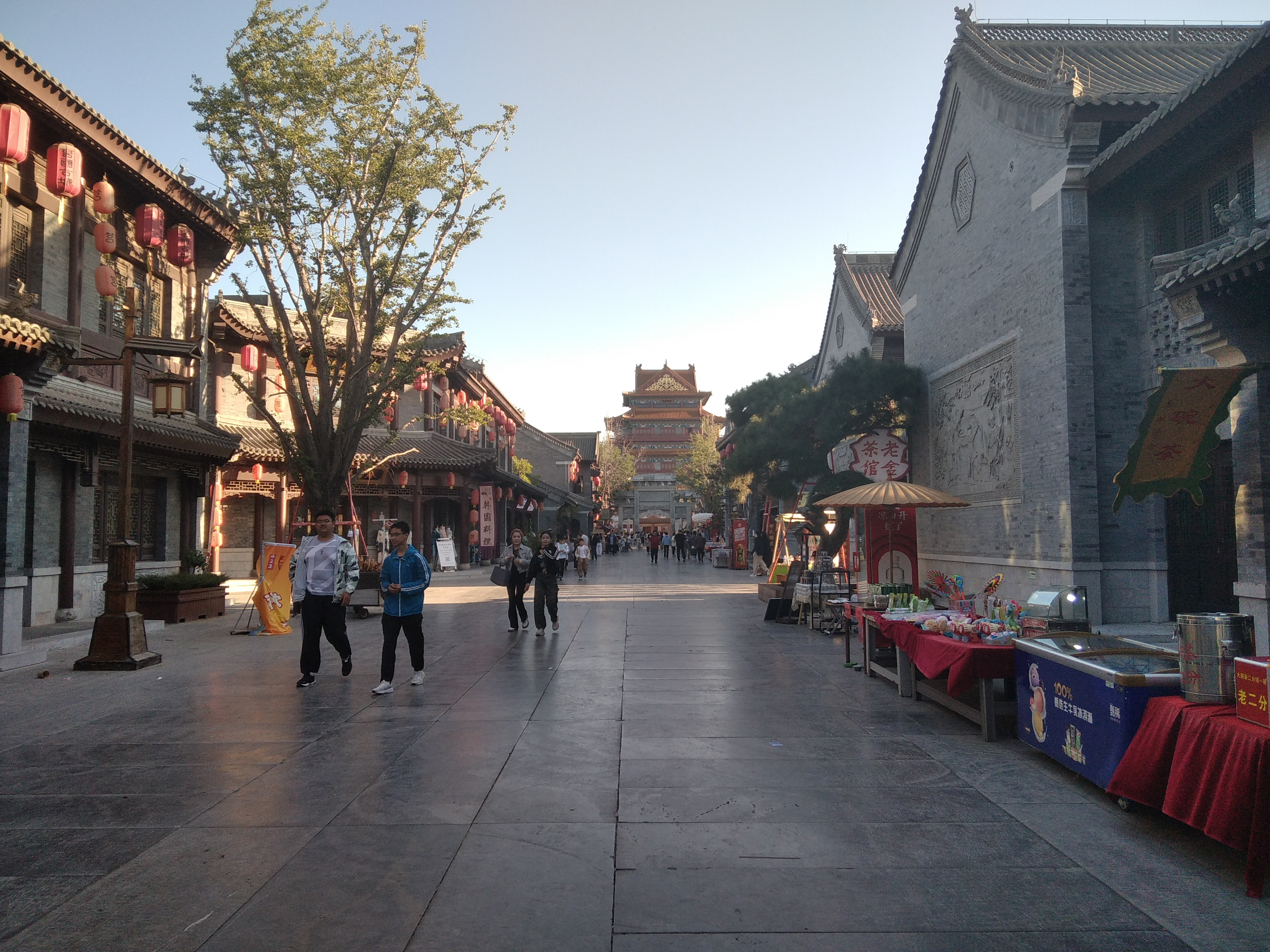
- Ju County, Rizhao City, Shandong Province, Ancient City of Ju State

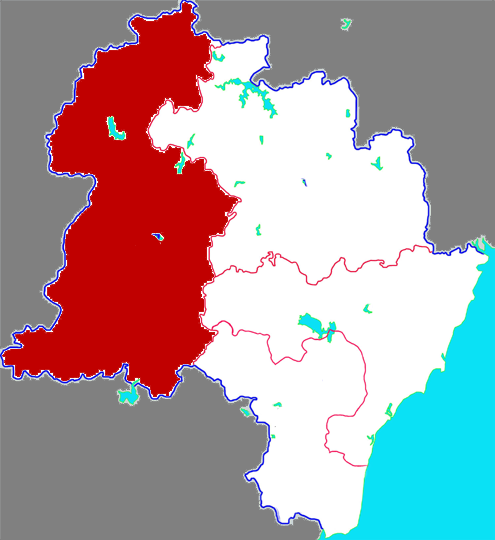
- Location in Rizhao

- Location of the seat in Shandong
- Coordinates: 35°34′36.90″N 118°50′01.02″E
- Country: People's Republic of China
- Province: Shandong
- Prefecture-level city: Rizhao

Area
  - Total: 1,950 km^{2} (750 sq mi)

Population (2019)
  - Total: 997,000
  - Density: 511/km^{2} (1,320/sq mi)
- Time zone: UTC+8 (China Standard)
- Postal code: 276599
- Website: www.juxian.gov.cn/zjjx.php

Ju County or Juxian (simplified Chinese: 莒县; traditional Chinese: 莒縣; pinyin: Jǔ Xiàn) is a county of Rizhao City, in the south of Shandong, China. As of the end of 2021, the total registered population of Ju County was 1.167 million. It covers an area of 1,821 km^{2} (703 sq mi).

The Fulaishan Scenic Area (浮来山景区; Fúláishān Jǐngqū) is located on the western border of Ju County. It is noteworthy for an ancient ginkgo tree that grows in the center of the front yard of Dinglin Temple (定林寺; Dìnglín Sì) and is believed to be nearly 4000 years old. The tree is 26.7 meters high and 15.7 meters thick, covering an area of more than 600 square meters. In 1982, UNESCO conducted a special study on this tree and broadcast its close-up to the world.

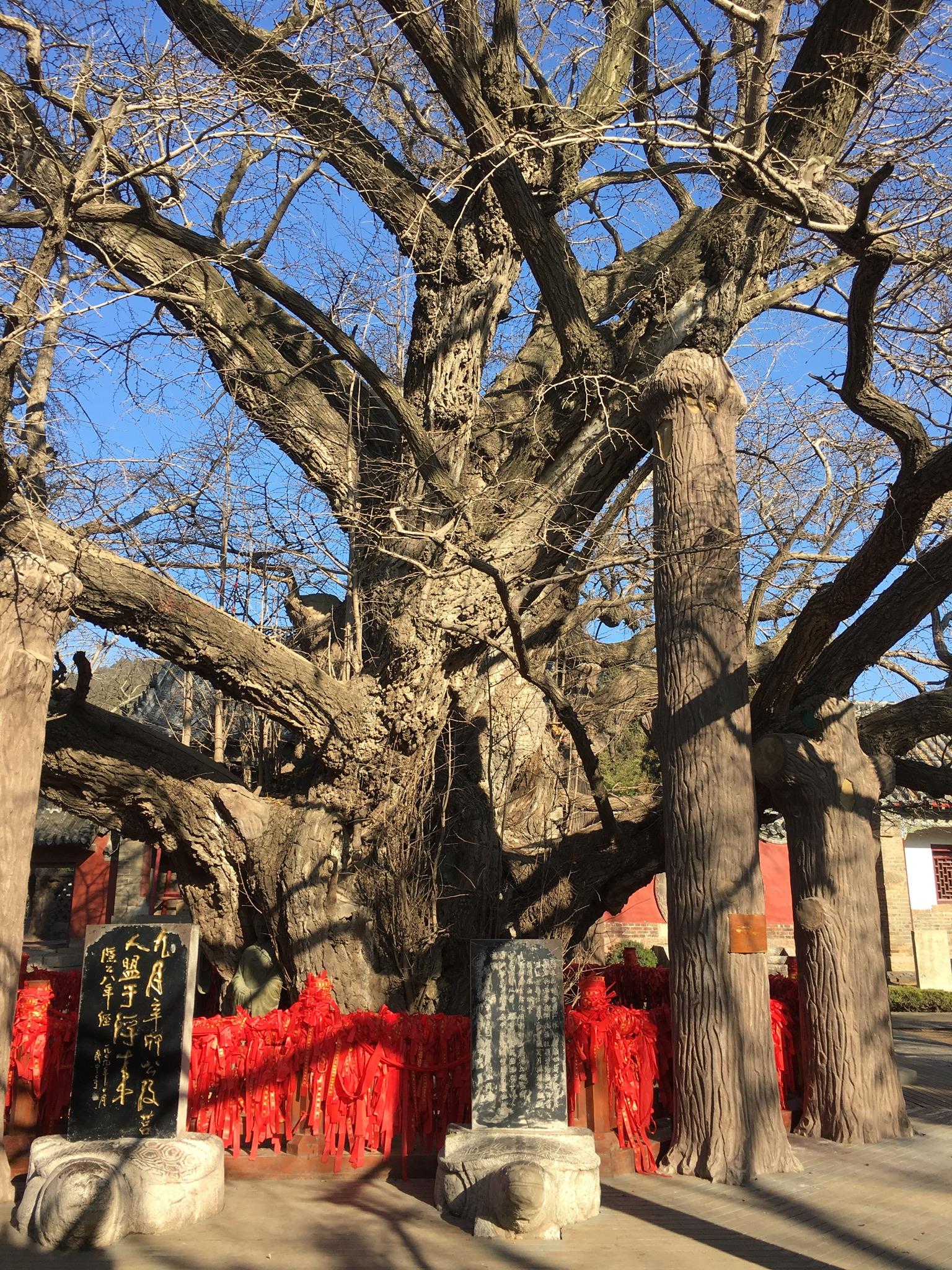
Ginkgo Tree in Dinglin Temple, Fulaishan Scenic Area (December 2016)

== Administrative divisions ==
As of 2012, this county is divided to 18 towns and 3 townships.

Towns

- Chengyang (城阳镇)
- Zhaoxian (招贤镇)
- Yanzhuang (阎庄镇)
- Xiazhuang (夏庄镇)
- Liuguanzhuang (刘官庄镇)
- Qiaoshan (峤山镇)
- Xiaodian (小店镇)
- Zhonglou (中楼镇)
- Longshan (龙山镇)
- Dongguan (东莞镇)
- Fulaishan (浮来山镇)
- Lingyang (陵阳镇)
- Dianziji (店子集镇)
- Changling (长岭镇)
- Anzhuang (安庄镇)
- Qishan (棋山镇)
- Luohe (洛河镇)
- Sangyuan (桑园镇)

Townships

- Zhailihe Township (寨里河乡)
- Guozhuang Township (果庄乡)
- Kushan Township (库山乡)

== Climate ==
Climate data for Juxian, elevation 107 m (351 ft), (1991–2020 normals, extremes 1981–present)
Month	Jan	Feb	Mar	Apr	May	Jun	Jul	Aug	Sep	Oct	Nov	Dec	Year
Record high °C (°F)	16.4 (61.5)	23.5 (74.3)	30.0 (86.0)	33.0 (91.4)	35.4 (95.7)	37.4 (99.3)	40.6 (105.1)	38.4 (101.1)	35.2 (95.4)	33.2 (91.8)	25.9 (78.6)	17.6 (63.7)	40.6 (105.1)
Mean daily maximum °C (°F)	4.1 (39.4)	7.4 (45.3)	13.5 (56.3)	20.2 (68.4)	25.6 (78.1)	29.2 (84.6)	30.6 (87.1)	29.8 (85.6)	26.5 (79.7)	20.9 (69.6)	13.0 (55.4)	6.1 (43.0)	18.9 (66.0)
Daily mean °C (°F)	−1.5 (29.3)	1.4 (34.5)	7.0 (44.6)	13.7 (56.7)	19.3 (66.7)	23.4 (74.1)	26.0 (78.8)	25.2 (77.4)	20.8 (69.4)	14.6 (58.3)	7.2 (45.0)	0.6 (33.1)	13.1 (55.7)
Mean daily minimum °C (°F)	−5.9 (21.4)	−3.2 (26.2)	1.6 (34.9)	7.7 (45.9)	13.5 (56.3)	18.5 (65.3)	22.5 (72.5)	21.7 (71.1)	16.3 (61.3)	9.5 (49.1)	2.5 (36.5)	−3.6 (25.5)	8.4 (47.2)
Record low °C (°F)	−19.9 (−3.8)	−18.3 (−0.9)	−11.6 (11.1)	−5.1 (22.8)	−0.2 (31.6)	7.2 (45.0)	15.0 (59.0)	11.8 (53.2)	4.7 (40.5)	−3.9 (25.0)	−11.7 (10.9)	−20.1 (−4.2)	−20.1 (−4.2)
Average precipitation mm (inches)	10.0 (0.39)	15.3 (0.60)	17.6 (0.69)	33.7 (1.33)	61.4 (2.42)	98.4 (3.87)	208.0 (8.19)	209.5 (8.25)	64.8 (2.55)	28.1 (1.11)	28.9 (1.14)	13.0 (0.51)	788.7 (31.05)
Average precipitation days (≥ 0.1 mm)	3.4	3.9	4.3	6.4	7.3	8.4	12.4	12.5	7.4	5.4	5.1	3.7	80.2
Average snowy days	3.6	2.9	1.5	0.2	0	0	0	0	0	0	0.7	2.2	11.1
Average relative humidity (%)	66	64	59	61	66	72	82	84	78	72	70	68	70
Mean monthly sunshine hours	149.1	154.2	201.8	215.6	235.9	199.3	174.7	179.3	183.2	181.4	151.3	152.0	2,177.8
Percentage possible sunshine	48	50	54	55	54	46	40	43	50	53	50	50	49
Source: China Meteorological Administration all-time August high

== Famous people ==
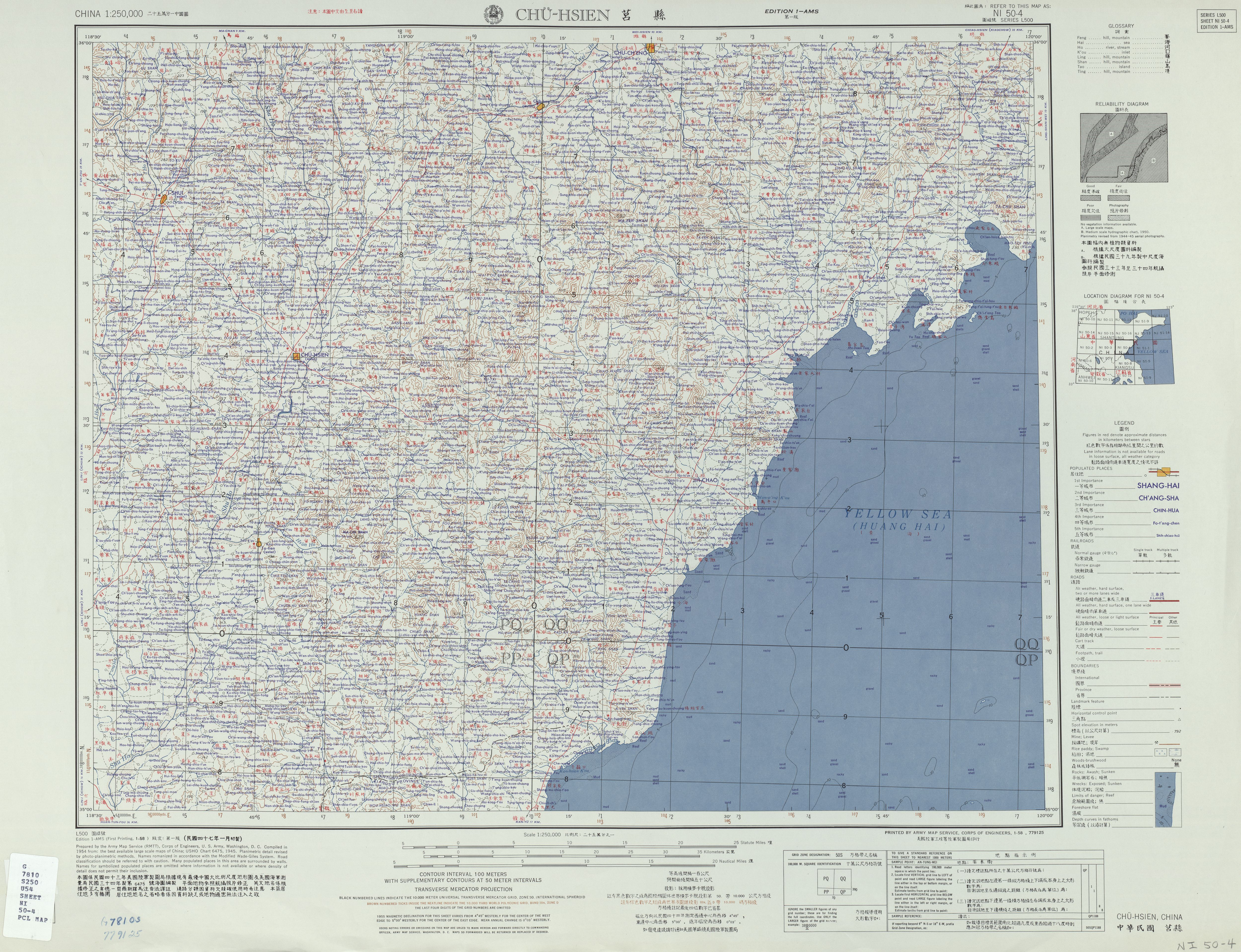
Ju County (labelled as CHÜ-HSIEN 莒縣) (1954)

=== Liu Xie ===
Liu Xie (about 467-539), Courtesy name Yan, lived in Dongguan in the Northern and Southern Dynasties, who is the writer of "Wenxindiaolong".

=== Song Ping ===
Song Ping, born in Luozhuang Zhaoxian in 1917, graduated from the College of Agriculture at Peking University, Tsinghua University study in 1936. He joined the Chinese Communist Party in 1937. In June 1989, he was elected as the Politburo Standing Committee in the CCP Fourth Plenary Session of the Thirteenth.

== Honor ==
=== National Civilized County ===
In 2011, Ju was honored as the National Civilized County.

=== China's Most Unusual Charm County ===
In 2009, Ju was honored as China's Most Unusual Charm County.

== See also ==
- Ju (city), an ancient Chinese city located within this territory
- Ju County attack, an unconfirmed onslaught in February 2024
- Shui Dong, a village in Luohe, Ju County
- Xia Tun, a village in Guozhuang, Ju County
- Zhuangjiashan, a village in Dongguan, Ju County
