= Ju (city) =

Ancient Chinese city

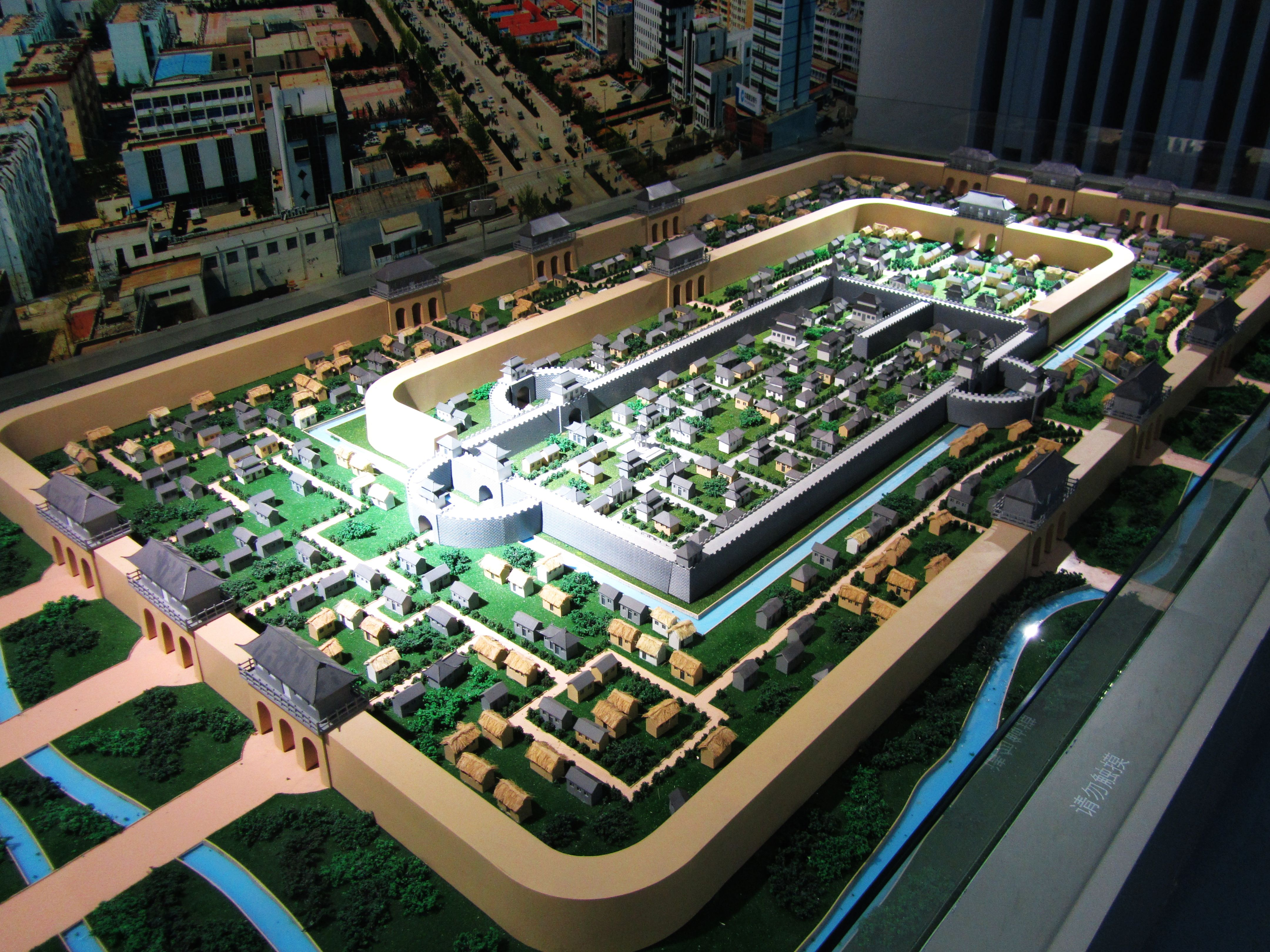
Model of the ancient city of Ju at the Rizhao Urban Planning Exhibition Hall in 2011

Ju (Chinese: 莒; pinyin: Jǔ) was an ancient Chinese city that existed during the Warring States period, and was located in what is today Ju County, Rizhao City, Shandong Province.

The State of Ju was originally a vassal state of the Zhou dynasty during the Spring and Autumn period. The state eventually fell to the State of Qi, and became a city of Qi.

In 284 BC, the State of Yan attacked the State of Qi with forces commanded by Yue Yi, and managed to corner Qi within the city of Ju, the state's final stronghold. Although Qi lost a significant portion of territory, they were able to successfully counterattack against Yan under the leadership of Tian Dan and retake its lost territory within five years.

The idiom 毋忘在莒 (do not forget what happened in Ju) has two allusions with differing meanings, one of which refers to Qi's successful counterattack against Yan from the city of Ju, and is used to represent a retaking of one's homeland. The idiom was used by the Chiang Kai-shek-led Republic of China government after relocating to Taiwan in its effort to retake mainland China.

== See also ==
- Wu-Wang-Zai-Ju Inscribed Rock
