= Mount Taiwu =

Mountain in Jinhu, Kinmen, Taiwan

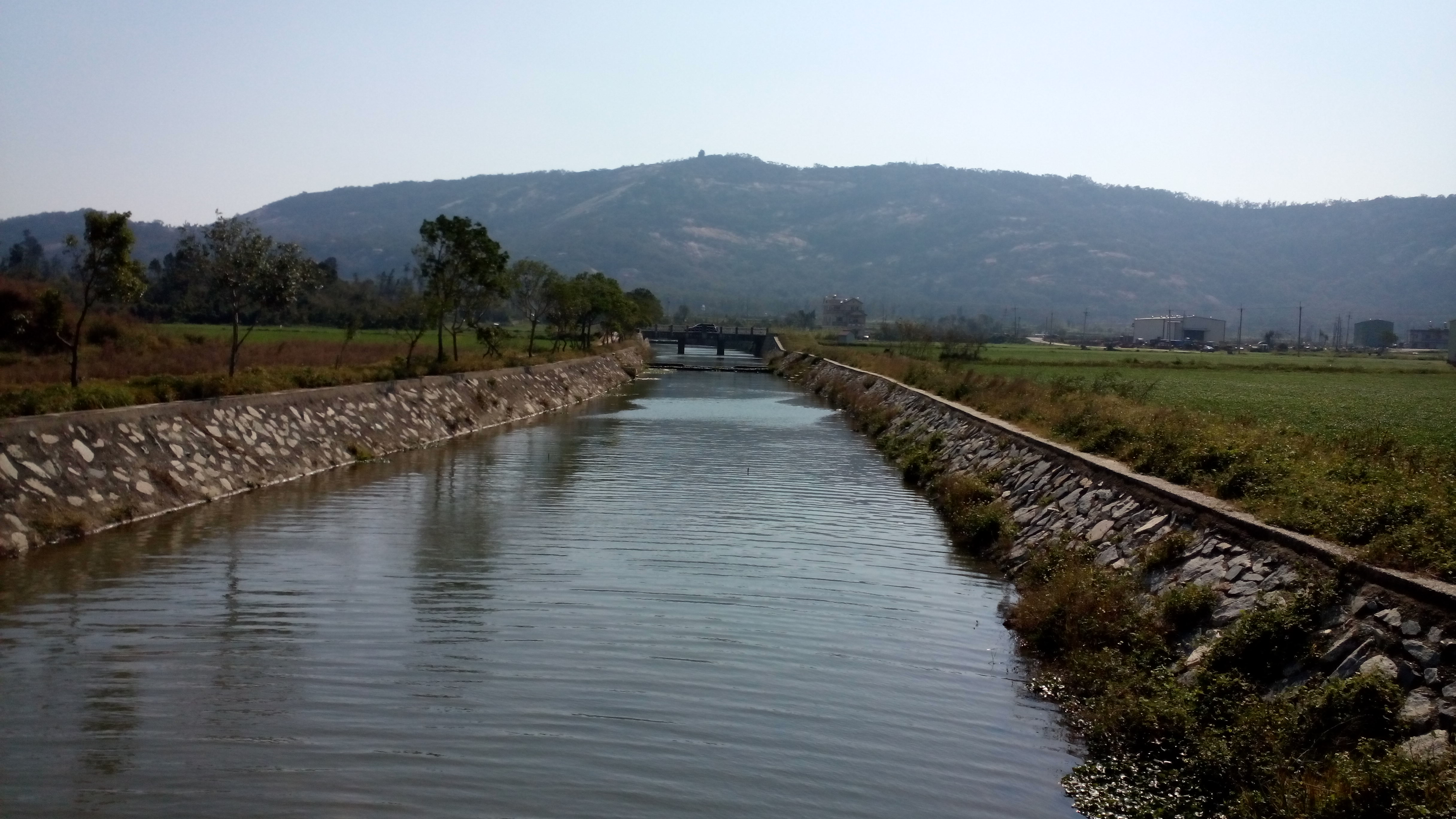

Highest point
- Elevation: 253 m (830 ft)
- Coordinates: 24°27′25.5″N 118°24′16.3″E

Naming
- Native name: 太武山 (Chinese)

Geography
- Location: Jinhu, Kinmen, Taiwan

The Mount Taiwu (Chinese: 太武山; pinyin: Tàiwǔ Shān) is a mountain in Jinhu Township, Kinmen County, Taiwan. It is the highest peak in Kinmen.

== History ==
The trails on the mountain used to be the walking path for traders carrying foods in the old days, such as tofu and vegetables, thus the trail was named Tofu Ancient Trail (Chinese: 豆腐古道). Starting 2017, the Kinmen County Government started to promote the hiking trail for tourism.

== Geology ==
The mountain stands at a height of 253 meters (830 ft). It features several hiking trails with granite steps which leads up to the mountain peak, such as the Tofu Ancient Trail and Caicuo Ancient Trail (Chinese: 蔡厝古道).

== Tourist attractions ==
- Wu-Wang-Zai-Ju Inscribed Rock

== See also ==
- List of tourist attractions in Taiwan
- List of mountains in Taiwan
