= Chen Jing-lan Western House =

Historic house in Jinhu, Kinmen, Taiwan

- 陳景蘭洋樓
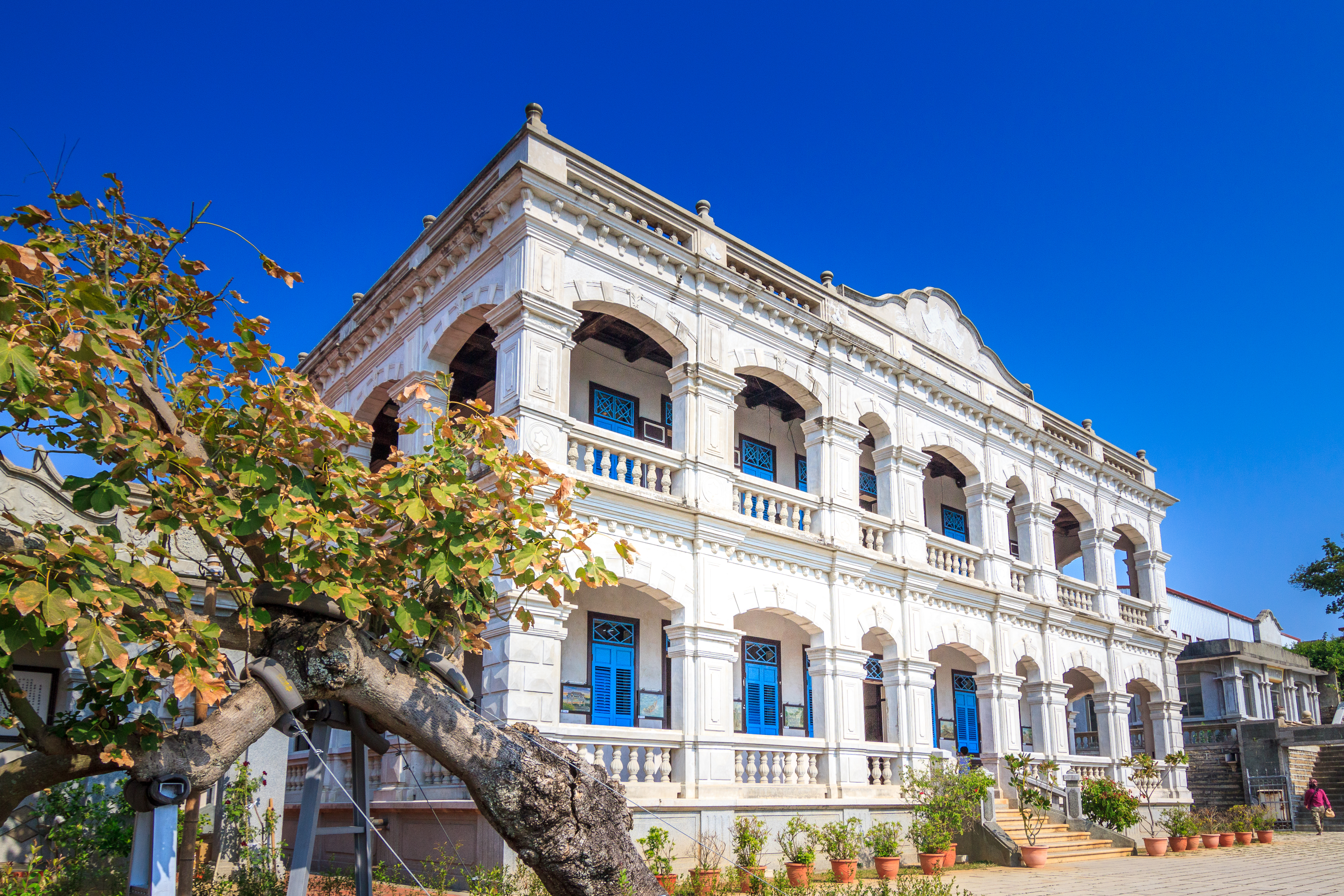
- Interactive map of the Chen Jing-lan Western House area

General information
- Type: former house
- Location: Jinhu, Kinmen Taiwan
- Coordinates: 24°26′14.2″N 118°23′24.4″E
- Completed: 1917

Technical details
- Floor count: 2
- Floor area: 1,590 m^{2}

Design and construction
- Developer: Chen Jing-lan

The Chen Jing-lan Western House (traditional Chinese: 陳景蘭洋樓; simplified Chinese: 陈景兰洋楼; pinyin: Chénjǐnglán Yáng Lóu) is a former house in Jinhu Township, Kinmen County, Taiwan. It is the largest Western-style house in Kinmen.

== History ==
The house was originally built in 1917 by Chen Jing-lan, a local businessperson who built up his success in Singapore. A small section of the building was dedicated for his house. During World War II, the house was used as a military hospital. Eventually, the house was renovated and opened to public for exhibition.

== Architecture ==
The house building as a total area of 1,590 m^{2} over two floors.

== See also ==
- List of tourist attractions in Taiwan
