= August 23 Artillery Battle Museum =

Museum in Jinhu, Kinmen, Taiwan

- 八二三戰史館
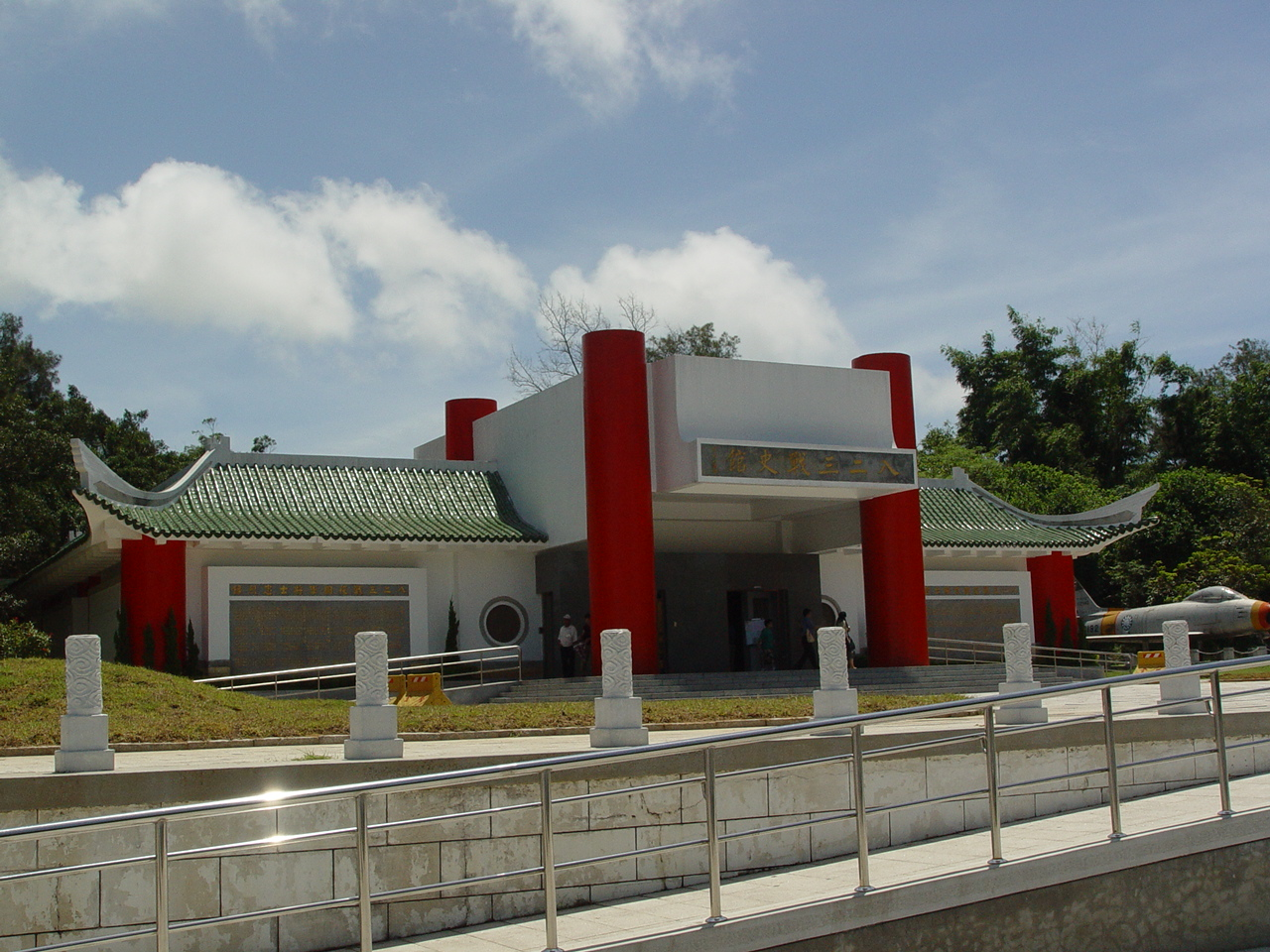
- Established: 1988
- Location: Jinhu, Kinmen, Taiwan
- Coordinates: 24°26′35″N 118°25′57″E
- Type: Museum

The August 23 Artillery Battle Museum (traditional Chinese: 八二三戰史館; simplified Chinese: 八二三战史馆; pinyin: Bā'èrsān Zhàn Shǐguǎn) is a museum in Zhongzheng Park, Jinhu Township, Kinmen, Taiwan.

== History ==
The museum was built in 1988 to commemorate the 30th anniversary of the 23 August 1958 Artillery War during the Second Taiwan Strait Crisis.

== Architecture ==
On both sides of the museum main entrance are carved the names of the 587 ROC armed forces servicemen who lost their lives in the bombardment. On the left side are displayed the main air fighter used by the forces at that time and the main artillery piece. On the right side is one of the amphibious landing craft which played a vital role in transporting troops and materials during the battle. The museum building is surrounded by banyan trees.

== Exhibitions ==
The museum exhibits historical artifacts in 12 display areas for charts, photographs, documents, relics and models.

== See also ==
- List of museums in Taiwan
