= Yanzhuang, Ju County =

Yanzhuang 阎庄镇
- Town
- Location in Shandong
- Coordinates: 35°39′45″N 118°50′03″E
- Country: People's Republic of China
- Province: Shandong
- Prefecture-level city: Rizhao
- County: Ju
- Elevation: 117 m (384 ft)
- Time zone: UTC+8 (China Standard)
- Area code: 0633

Yanzhuang (simplified Chinese: 阎庄; traditional Chinese: 閻莊; pinyin: Yánzhuāng) is a town in Ju County in southern Shandong province, China, located 9 kilometres (5.6 mi) due north of the county seat. As of 2011, it has 49 villages under its administration.

== See also ==
- List of township-level divisions of Shandong
