= Sangyuan, Shandong =

Sangyuan 桑园镇
- Town
- Location in Shandong
- Coordinates: 35.67048°N 119.03602°E
- Country: People's Republic of China
- Province: Shandong
- Prefecture-level city: Rizhao
- County: Ju County
- Time zone: UTC+8 (China Standard)

Sangyuan (simplified Chinese: 桑园; traditional Chinese: 桑園; pinyin: Sāngyuán) is a town under the administration of Ju County in Shandong, China. As of 2018, it has one residential community and six villages under its administration.
