= Wind Lion Plaza =

Shopping mall in Jinhu, Kinmen, Taiwan

- 風獅爺購物中心
- Location: No. 8-8, Zhongshan Road, Jinhu, Kinmen, Taiwan
- Coordinates: 24.44179853119593°N 118.36333390548077°E
- Opened: April 23, 2014
- Developer: Taiwan Land Development Corporation & Yoshimoto Kogyo
- Website: www.windlion.com

Wind Lion Plaza (Chinese: 風獅爺購物中心) is a shopping center in Jinhu Township, Kinmen County, Republic of China (Taiwan) that opened on April 23, 2014. Jointly developed by Taiwan Land Development Corporation and Yoshimoto Kogyo, it is the largest shopping mall in the county. The mall is located in close proximity to Kinmen Airport.

== Facilities ==
The shopping mall is divided into three areas: north, west and south. The west building with a total floor area of 12,284 m^{2} (132,220 sq ft) is for sports and leisure apparel, accessories, toys, supermarkets and Golden Lion Studios (with 4D Cinemax); the north building includes jewelry art and Kinmen specialties store, Costco, cosmetics, catering; in the south building, there is a duty-free shop LAOX.

== See also ==
- List of tourist attractions in Taiwan
