= Beiding Island =

Island west of Taiwan

Coordinates: 24°25′55″N 118°31′1″E

Native name: 北碇島 / 北椗島
- Interactive map of Beiding Island

Geography
- Location: Jinhu Township, Kinmen County, Fujian, Republic of China (Taiwan)
- Area: 0.0800 km^{2} (0.0309 sq mi)

Administration
- Republic of China (Taiwan)
- Province: Fujian
- County: Kinmen
- Urban Township: Jinhu

Additional information
- Time zone: National Standard Time (UTC+8)

Location of Beiding Island

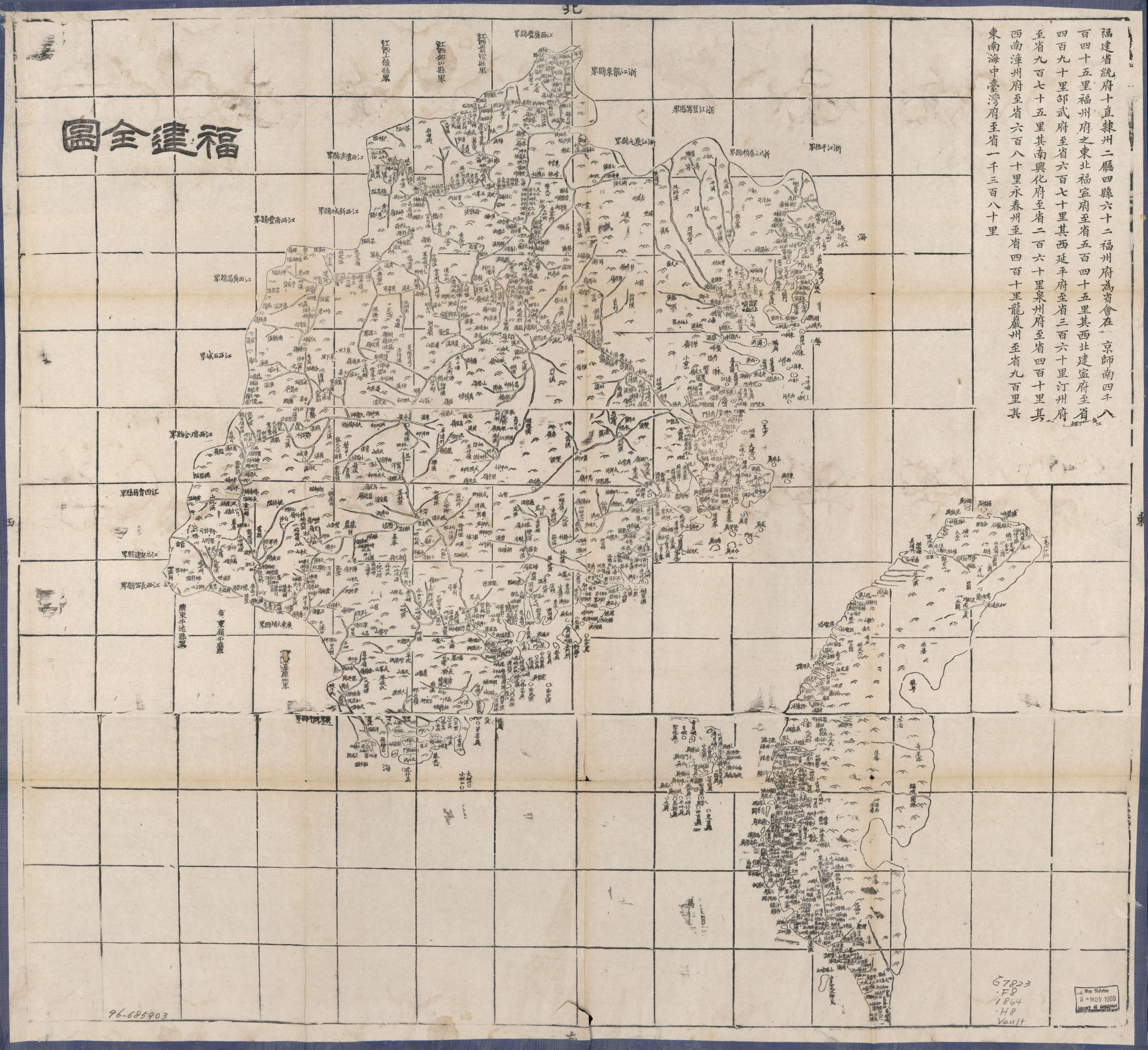
Beiding Island (shown as "比定㠘")

Beiding Island (Dodd Island, Pei-ting Tao, Beiding Dao) (北碇島, pinyin: Běidìng Dǎo) is an island located east of Greater Kinmen in Jinhu Township, Kinmen County, Fujian Province, Republic of China (Taiwan).

== History ==
The lighthouse on Beiding Island was designed and constructed by British engineer David Marr Henderson. Plans for its construction were proposed in 1875 (the first year of the Guangxu reign). Four years later, lighting equipment was ordered from European manufacturers. Construction commenced in 1882 (the eighth year of the Guangxu reign), and the light was first lit on October 18, 1883 (September 18, 9th year of the Guangxu reign). Historically, Beidingshan Lighthouse appeared under various aliases in multiple English documents, underscoring its pivotal role in international shipping.

The Beidingshan Lighthouse and its ancillary facilities include offices, dormitories, a granite water reservoir, flagpoles, and other structures. A fog cannon was originally installed but has since been removed. All buildings are situated atop the southern peak of the island, occupying an irregularly shaped base that nearly covers the entire island.

The Beidingshan Island Lighthouse is a circular brick structure with white-painted exterior walls. Three granite frames are embedded at the tower's center to reinforce structural integrity, and the tower body is clad in white granite. It is the only lighthouse utilizing granite frames. The tower stands 17.5 meters tall, with the light source positioned at 36.3 meters. The original lighting apparatus employed a first-class reflector lamp with a six-wick kerosene burner. In 1913, it was replaced with a kerosene vapor lamp manufactured by Chance Brothers and Co. Ltd. of Britain, fitted with an 85-millimeter white incandescent lampshade—the company's finest patented product. The equipment underwent three subsequent upgrades. and a post-war upgrade to the current electric lighting system, achieving a nominal range of 11.3 nautical miles.

During World War II, the tower structure and lantern room atop Beidingshan Lighthouse were destroyed by Allied bomber attacks. Subsequently, the lantern was temporarily mounted on a simple triangular iron frame to maintain operation. The bombed-off roof section was rebuilt into a memorial pedestal and installed at the base.

From the 1920s to the 1930s, Beidingshan Lighthouse served as a training site for foreign lighthouse keepers. However, as Chinese personnel gradually filled the keeper positions, the training program was discontinued.

On September 8, 1978, a butchers group from Jinhu visited Dongding Island and Beiding Island to bring gifts to the soldiers there. They wished the soldiers a happy upcoming Mid-Autumn Festival.

On March 31, 2018, the Chinese freight ship YUAN TAI（遠泰）789 struck rocks in the waters near Beiding Island. Nine crew members escaped without injury.

== See also ==
- List of islands of Taiwan
