= Qionglin Tunnel =

Tunnel in Jinhu, Kinmen, Taiwan

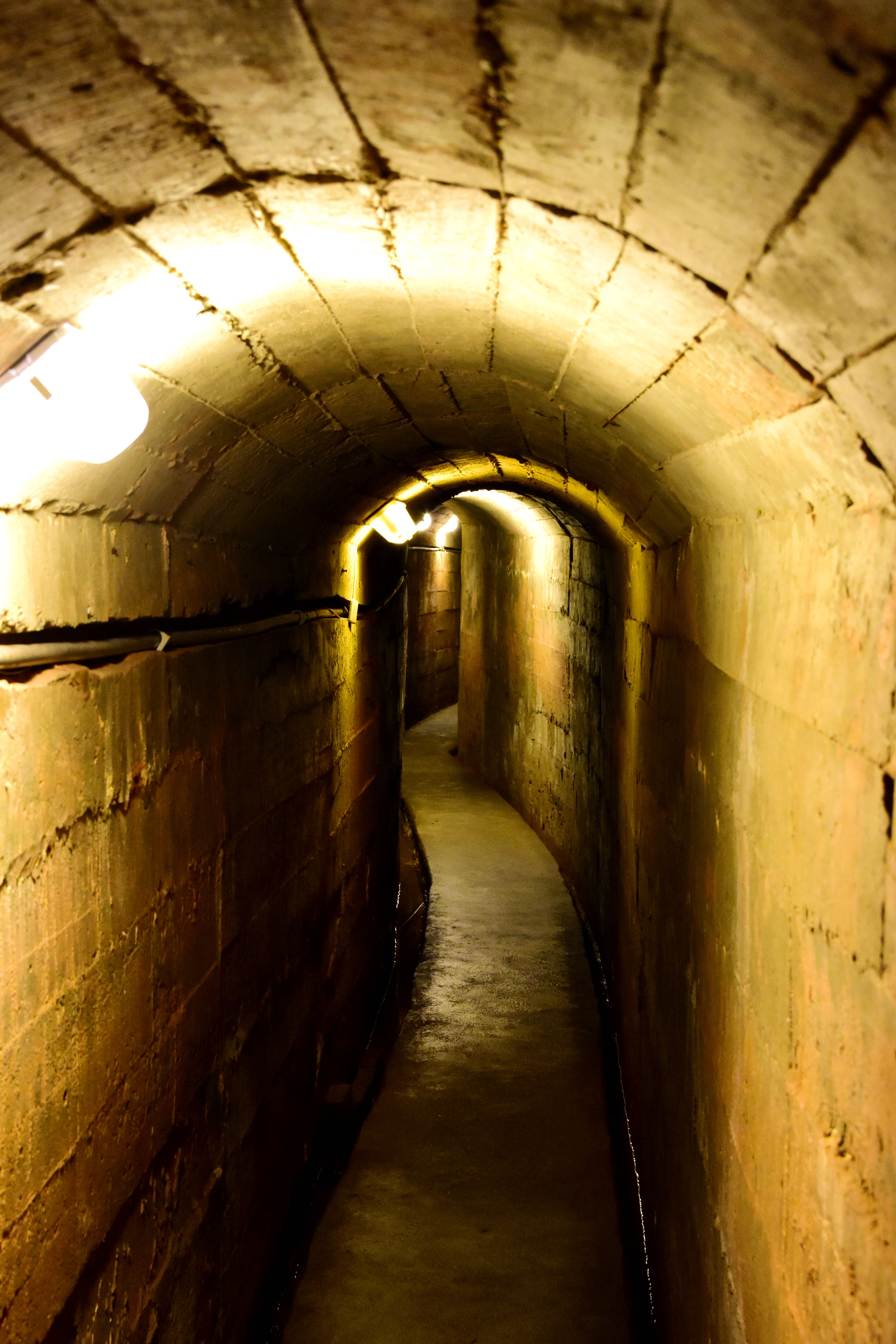
- Interactive map of Qionglin Tunnel

Overview
- Official name: 瓊林戰鬥坑道
- Location: Jinhu, Kinmen, Taiwan
- Coordinates: 24°27′18.8″N 118°22′23.0″E

Technical
- Length: 1,355 m (4,446 ft)

The Qionglin Tunnel (traditional Chinese: 瓊林戰鬥坑道; simplified Chinese: 琼林战斗坑道; pinyin: Qiónglín Zhàndòu Kēngdào) is a tunnel in Jinhu, Kinmen County, Taiwan.

== History ==
The tunnel was constructed in 1976.

== Architecture ==
The tunnel spans over a total length of 1,355 meters, making it the largest defense tunnel in Kinmen. It has a total 12 entrances and exits which are connected to critical facilities around the village.

== See also ==
- List of tourist attractions in Taiwan
