= Chenggong Coastal Defense Tunnel =

Tunnel in Jinhu, Kinmen, Taiwan

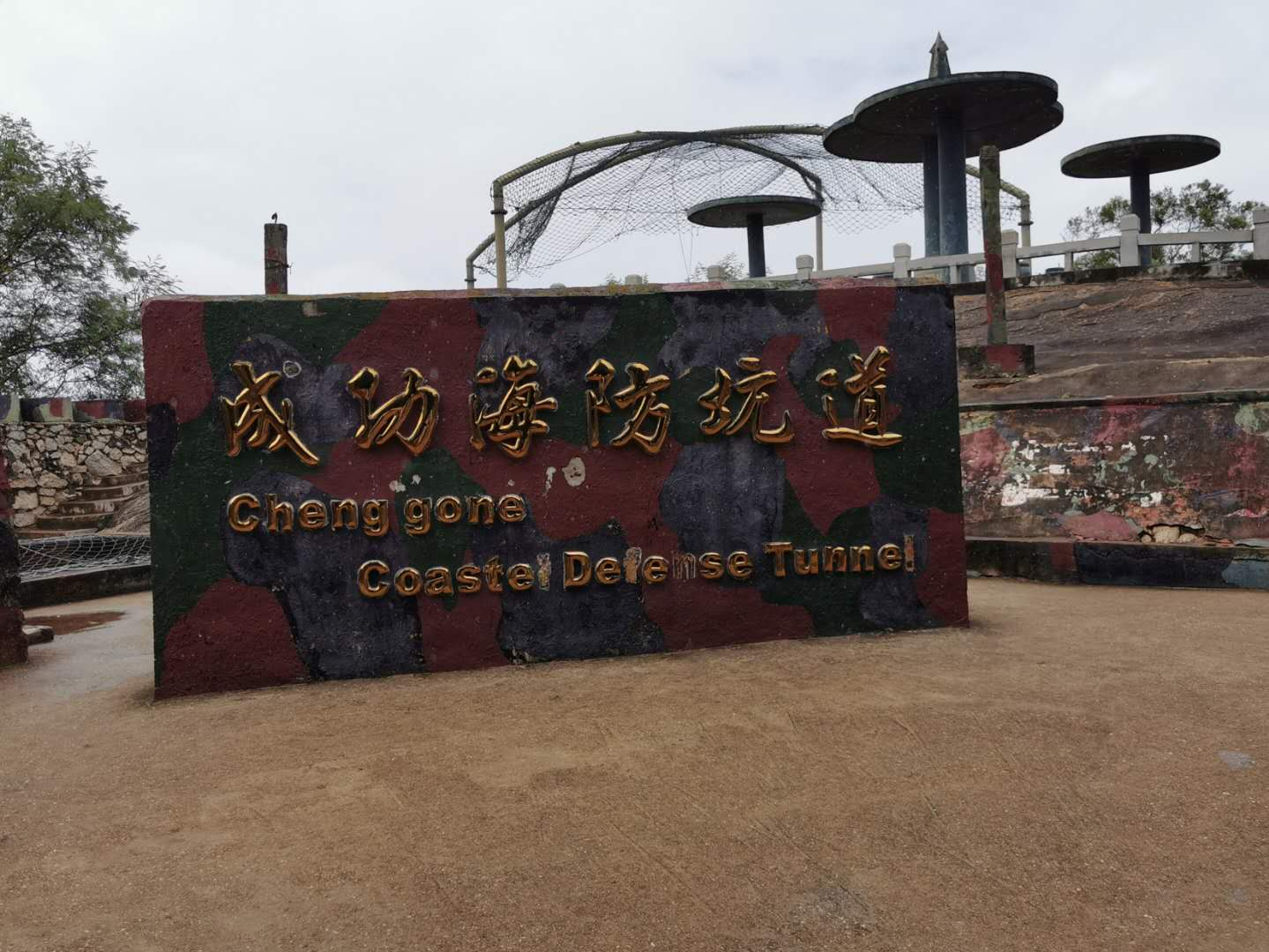
- Interactive map of Chenggong Coastal Defense Tunnel

Overview
- Official name: 成功海防坑道
- Location: Jinhu, Kinmen, Taiwan
- Coordinates: 24°26′11.2″N 118°23′18.6″E

Technical
- Length: 560 m (1,840 ft)

The Chenggong Coastal Defense Tunnel (Chinese: 成功海防坑道; pinyin: Chénggōng Hǎifáng Kēngdào) is a tunnel in Jinhu, Kinmen County, Taiwan.

== Geology ==
The tunnel was dug through granite layers of rock and concrete.

== Architecture ==
The tunnel is equipped with various military equipment, including command post, pillbox, barracks, toilets and kitchen. It spans over a length of 560 meters. It is divided into section, which are the section towards the sea and section leads to the village office.

== See also ==
- List of tourist attractions in Taiwan
