= Wu-Wang-Zai-Ju Inscribed Rock =

Rock in Jinhu, Kinmen, Taiwan

- Monument
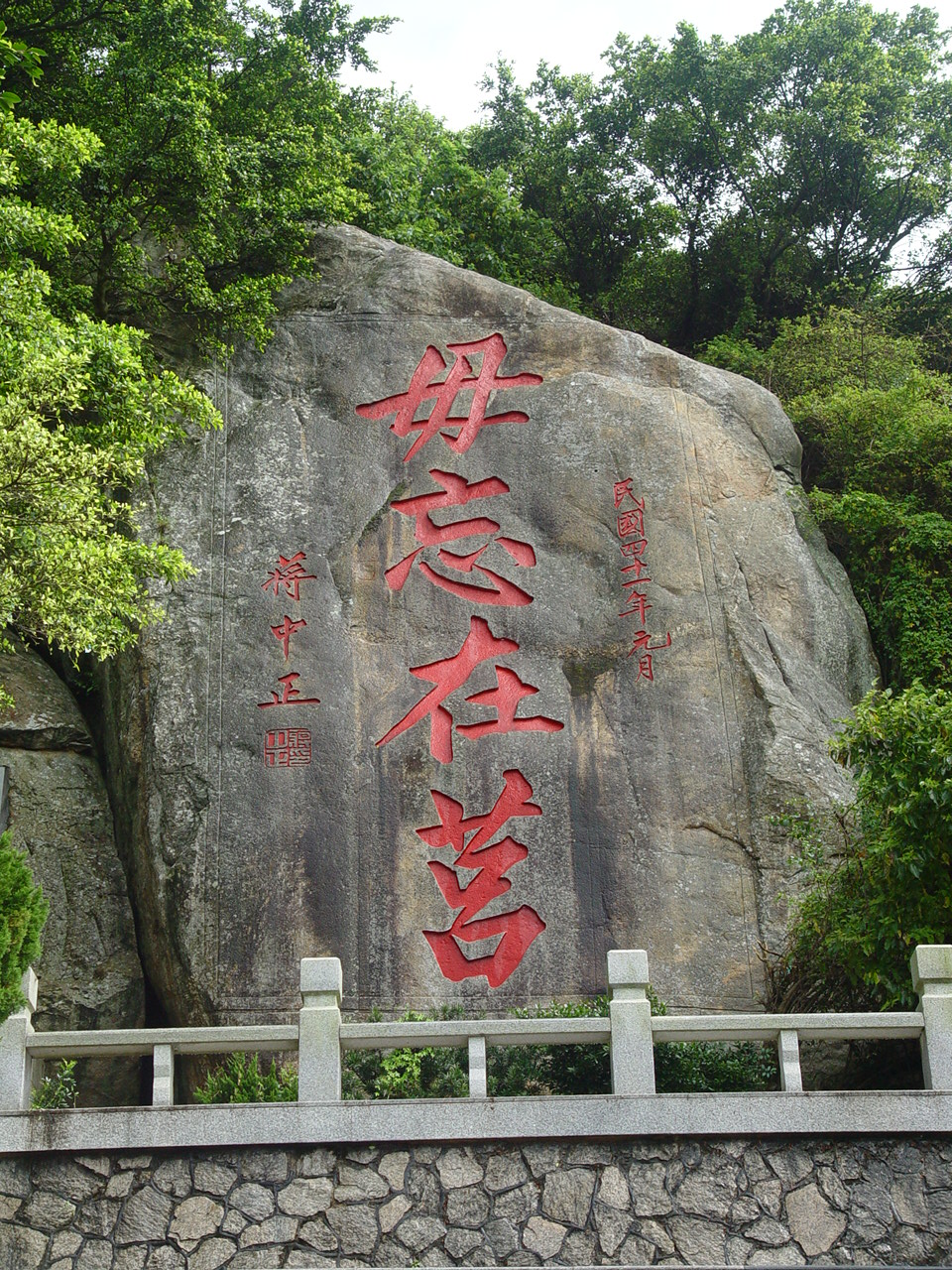

- Taiwan
- Coordinates: 24°27′49.1″N 118°24′58.2″E
- Location: Jinhu, Kinmen, Taiwan (ROC)
- Geology: rock

The Wu-Wang-Zai-Ju Inscribed Rock (Chinese: 毋忘在莒勒石; pinyin: Wú Wàng Zài Jǔ Lèshí) is a rock at Mount Taiwu in Jinhu Township, Kinmen County, Taiwan.

== History ==
After retreating to Taiwan at the end of the Chinese Civil War in 1949, Chiang Kai-shek tried to set up strategies to retake mainland China from the Chinese Communist Party. In 1952, he wished to make an inscription on a rock. General Hu Lien then tried to search for the ideal place to write such wordings. Once found, Chiang wrote four Chinese characters named 毋忘在莒 which means "Do not forget the experience in Ju" as a reminder to the Republic of China Armed Forces stationed in Kinmen. The words refer to the history of Tian Dan of the Qi State during the Warring States period.

== Geology ==
The rock is located at the top of Mount Taiwu.

== See also ==
- Geology of Taiwan
