= Taihu Reservoir =

Reservoir in Jinhu, Kinmen, Taiwan

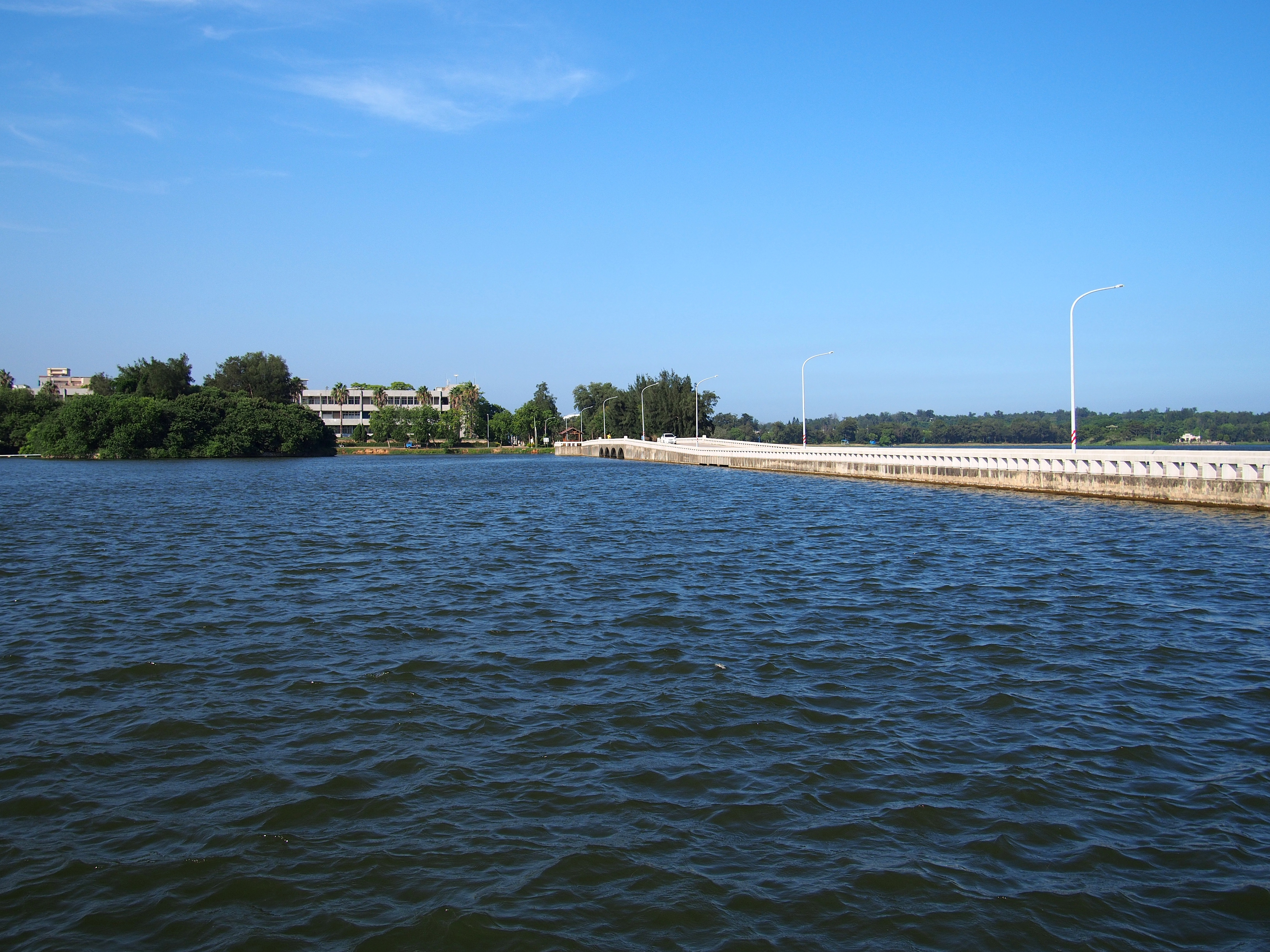

- Location within Taiwan
- Coordinates: 24°26′23.6″N 118°25′33.9″E
- Purpose: public water supply
- Construction began: October 1966

Taihu Reservoir (traditional Chinese: 太湖水庫; simplified Chinese: 太湖水库; pinyin: Tàihú shuǐkù), also spelled as Tai-Hu Reservoir, formerly known as Huanglong Reservoir, is a reservoir located in Jinhu Township, Kinmen County, Taiwan. It is one of the main water sources of Kinmen. And the "Lake Tai" formed by the Reservoir is the largest artificial freshwater lake in Kinmen.

The construction of the Taihu Reservoir started in October 1966 and was completed on April 10, 1967. The total storage capacity of the Reservoir is more than 1.14 million cubic meters, and the dam is 11.3 meters high and 600 meters long, making it the largest reservoir in the Kinmen region.
