= Kinmen Ceramics Museum =

Museum in Jinhu, Kinmen, Taiwan

- 金門陶瓷博物館
- Location: Jinhu, Kinmen, Taiwan
- Coordinates: 24°26′07.3″N 118°24′25.1″E
- Type: museum

The Kinmen Ceramics Museum (traditional Chinese: 金門陶瓷博物館; simplified Chinese: 金门陶瓷博物馆; pinyin: Jīnmén Táocí Bówùguǎn) is a museum in Jinhu Township, Kinmen County, Taiwan.

== History ==
The museum is part of Kinmen Ceramic Factory which was established in 1963.

== Exhibitions ==
The museum exhibits all kind of ceramic works and collections. In total there are around 376 works from various artists.

== See also ==
- List of museums in Taiwan
