= Zhuangjiashan =

Zhuangjiashan 庄家山村
- Village
- Location in Shandong
- Coordinates: 35°59′54.8″N 119°00′42.6″E
- Country: People's Republic of China
- Province: Shandong
- Prefecture-level city: Rizhao
- County: Ju County
- Town: Dongguan
- Elevation: 138 m (453 ft)
- Time zone: UTC+8 (China Standard)
- Postal code: 276528

Zhuangjiashan (simplified Chinese: 庄家山村; traditional Chinese: 莊家山村; pinyin: Zhuāngjiāshān Cūn) is a small village in Dongguan (东莞镇), northern Ju County, Shandong province, China. In 1988, a site containing historical relics of the Shang dynasty was discovered 50 meters to the south of the village.
