= Xiatun =

Xiatun 下屯村
- Village
- Location in Shandong
- Coordinates: 35°46′07″N 118°46′23″E
- Country: People's Republic of China
- Province: Shandong
- Prefecture-level city: Rizhao
- County: Ju
- Town: Guozhuang
- Settled: 1666 A.D.
- Time zone: UTC+8 (China Standard Time)
- Area Code: 0633
- Postal Code: 276533

Xiatun
- Chinese: 下屯
- Literal meaning: Village Down from Ridge
Transcriptions
Standard Mandarin
- Hanyu Pinyin: Xiàtún

Xiatun (下屯) is a village located in Guozhuang Town (果庄镇), Ju County, Rizhao City, Shandong Province, China. The dialect of Xiatun is Qingdao dialect.

Shuidong is on the east, with Guozhuang on the west. On the south is Wangjialing, and north is Tianguangzhuang.

== History ==
In 1666 AD, Bing settled the village named Xiatun to hide away. To avoid the strong wind, they moved down from the Ridge, renamed the village as Xiazhuang (下庄, literally "the village under the ridge"). To avoid duplicating names, they renamed again, which is Xiatun (下屯) until now.
