= Shuidong =

Shuidong 水东村
- Village
- Location in Shandong
- Coordinates: 35°46′24″N 118°47′45″E
- Country: People's Republic of China
- Province: Shandong
- Prefecture-level city: Rizhao
- County: Ju
- Town: Luohe
- Settled: Early in Ming Hongwu Dynasty
- Time zone: UTC+8 (China Standard Time)
- Area Code: 0633
- Postal Code: 276534

Shuidong
- Traditional Chinese: 水東
- Simplified Chinese: 水东
- Literal meaning: "East to the River"
Transcriptions
Standard Mandarin
- Hanyu Pinyin: ShǔiDōng

Shuidong is a village of the town of Luohe (洛河镇), Ju County, Rizhao, Shandong Province, China. The dialect of Shuidong is Qingdao dialect.

Xiatun is on its west, with Guozhuang nearby. On the south is Wangjialing, and north is the Shanjia Haipo.

== History ==
Liu settled the village, named from "the east of the river". The river is named "Shu River".
