= Zhongzheng Park (Kinmen) =

Park in Jinhu, Kinmen, Taiwan

- 中正公園
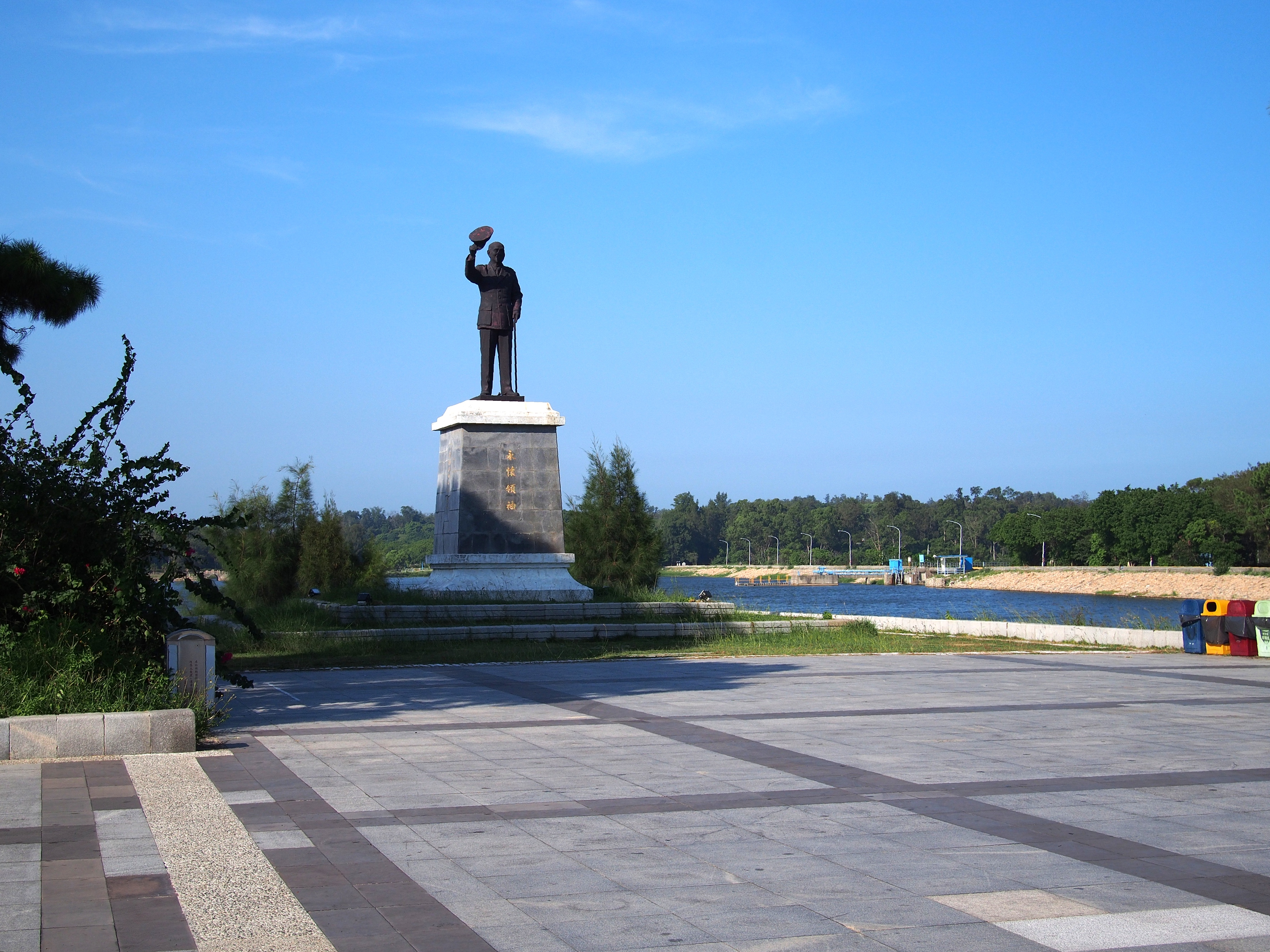
- Interactive map of Zhongzheng Park
- Type: park
- Location: Jinhu, Kinmen, Taiwan
- Coordinates: 24°26′11.6″N 118°25′36.1″E
- Opened: 1976

The Zhongzheng Park (traditional Chinese: 中正公園; simplified Chinese: 中正公园; pinyin: Zhōngzhèng Gōngyuán) is a park in Jinhu Township, Kinmen County, Taiwan.

== History ==
The park was established in 1976 by Kinmen County Government. In 1986, to celebrate the 100th birthday of President Chiang Kai-shek, military and civilians planted trees in front of the park.

== See also ==
- List of parks in Taiwan
