= Jinhu, Kinmen =

Urban township in Taiwan

Coordinates: 24.437691°N 118.427993°E

Jinhu Township 金湖鎮 Kinhu, Chin-hu
- Urban township
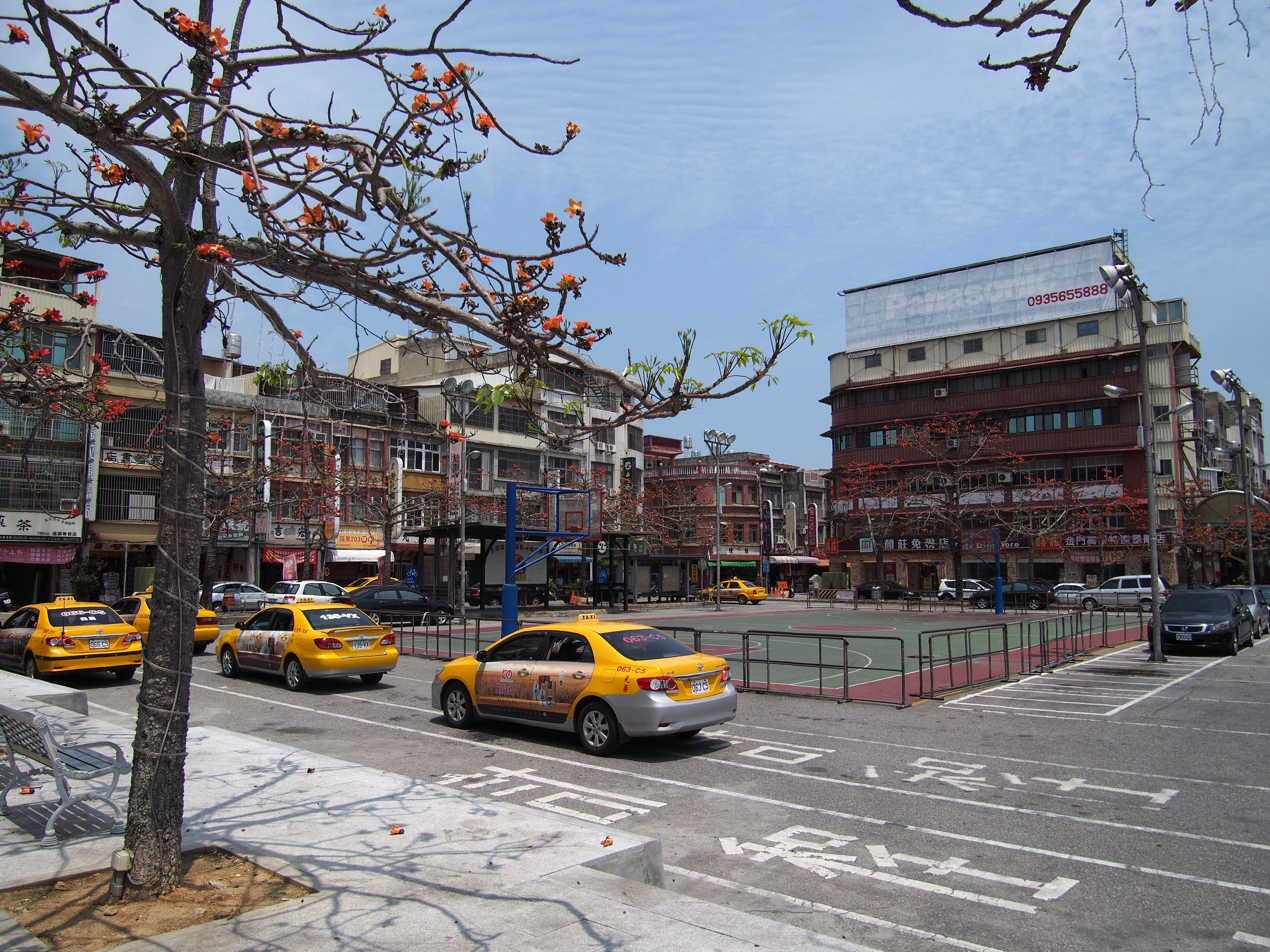

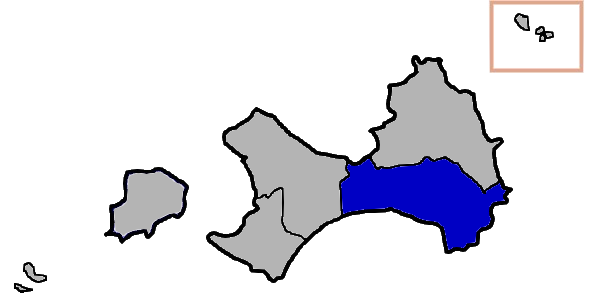
- Jinhu Township (blue) in Kinmen County (grey)
- Country: Republic of China (Taiwan)
- Province: Fuchien
- County: Kinmen
- Urban villages: 8

Government
  - Mayor: Chen Wen-Ku (陳文顧)

Area
  - Total: 41.7920 km^{2} (16.1360 sq mi)

Population (February 2023)
  - Total: 30,826
  - Density: 737.61/km^{2} (1,910.4/sq mi)
- Time zone: UTC+8 (National Standard Time)
- Postal code: 891
- Website: kinhu.kinmen.gov.tw/en

Jinhu Township (pinyin: Jīnhú Zhèn; Pe̍h-ōe-jī: Kim-ô͘-tìn; lit. 'golden lake') is an urban township of Kinmen, Fuchien, Taiwan. It is in the Taiwan Strait, on the coast of mainland China. Jinhu Township is the largest township in Kinmen County.

== History ==
On July 1, 1953, Canghu Township (滄湖鎮) was renamed Jinhu Township (金湖鄉), a rural township. In December 1957, Jinhu was changed back into an urban township.

In 1959, Jinqiong Township (金瓊鄉) was created from the two villages Zhengyi and Qionglin. On September 16, 1965, Jinqiong Township was disbanded and the major part of the two villages returned to Jinhu Township.

== Geography ==
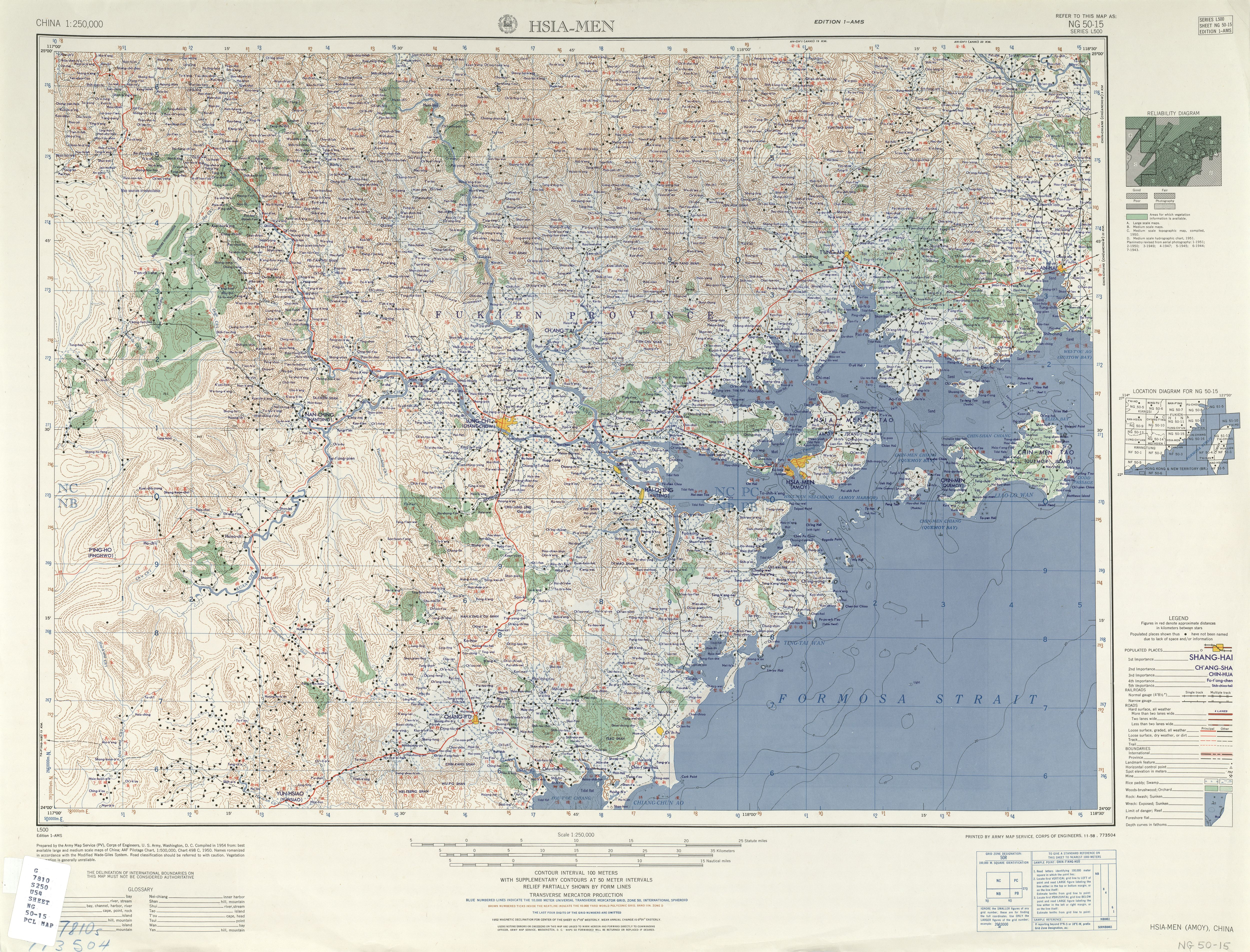
Map including the Jinhu Township area (1954)

It has a population of 30,826 (February 2023) and an area of 41.6960 km^{2} (16.0989 sq mi). The township includes Dongding Island, Beiding Island, and other small islets.

== Politics and government ==
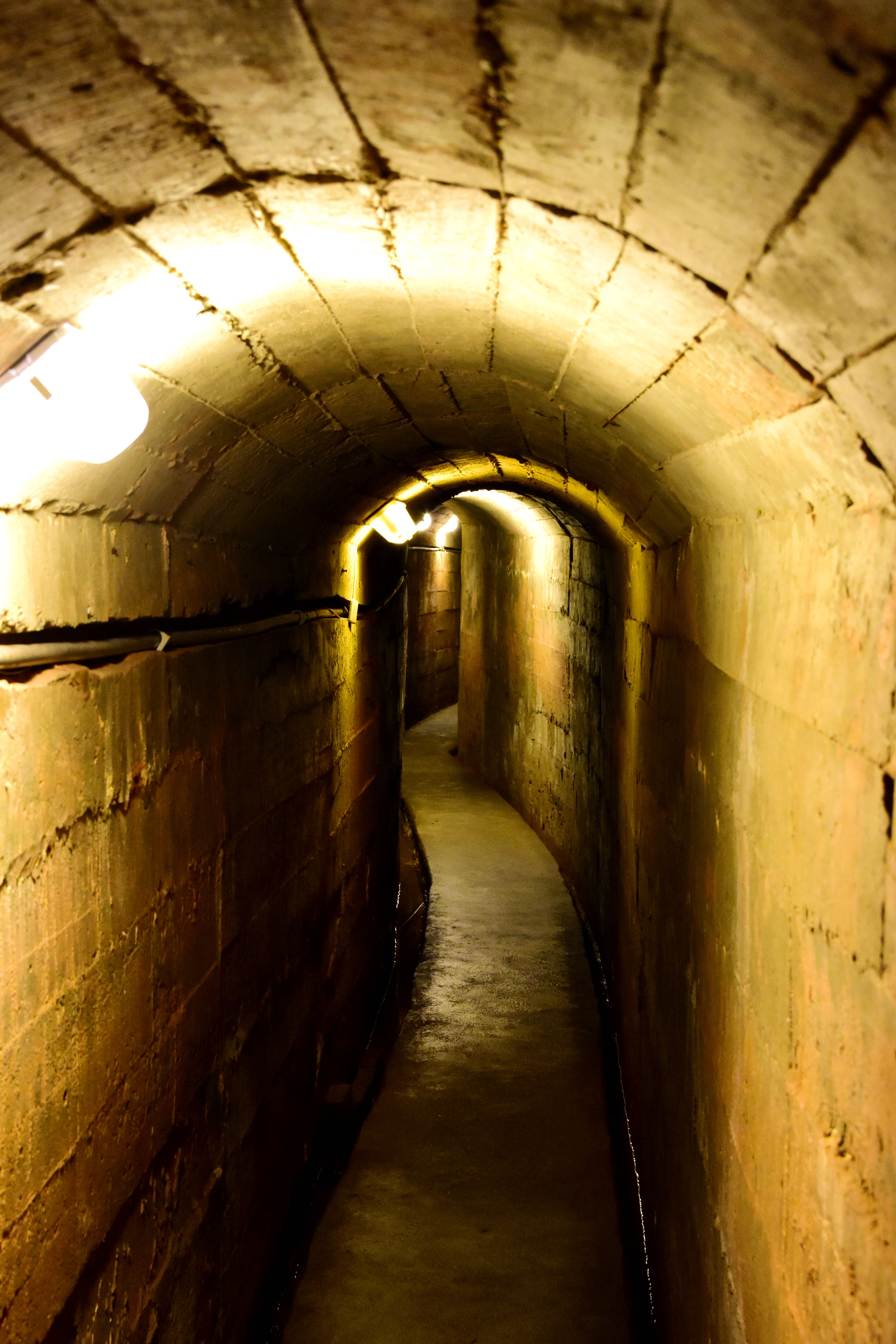
Qionglin Tunnel

=== Administrative divisions ===
Jinhu Township is made up of eight urban villages:

- Lianan / Lienan Village (蓮庵里)
- Liaoluo Village (料羅里)
- Qionglin / Cyonglin Village (Ch'iung-lin; 瓊林里)
- Shanwai Village (Shan-wai; 山外里)
- Xihu / Sihu Village (溪湖里)
- Xinhu / Sinhu Village (新湖里)
- Xinshi / Sinshi Village (新市里)
- Zhengyi / Jhengyi Village (正義里)

=== Mayors ===
- Mayor of Shawei (沙尾鎮)
1. Chang Jung-Chiang (張榮強) 1947-1951
- Appointed Mayors
1. Chen Te-hui (陳德輝)
2. Yang Cheng-Fu (楊誠福)
3. Wu Ti-Yuan (吳迪元)
4. Tsai In-Tang (蔡蔭堂) from 1954
5. Teng Chen-Kang (鄧振剛), also mayor of Jinsha, Kinmen
6. Li Tsai-Chien (黎在鍵)
7. Yang Yao-Ming (楊耀明)
8. Kai Chia-Ting (開嘉亭)
9. Chen I-Huang (陳依煌) 1971-1975
- Elected Mayors
1. Chen I-Huang (陳依煌) 1971-1975
2. Chen Yung-Tsai (陳永財) 1975-1986
3. Chen Yun-Hsuan (陳雲軒) 1986-1990
4. Chen Yung-Tsai (陳永財) 1990-1993
5. Tsai Fu-Lu (蔡福祿) 1993-1997
6. Chen Fu-hai 1997-2003
7. Li Cheng-I (李成義) 2003-2008
8. Tsai Hsien-Ching (蔡顯清) 2008-2010
9. Tsai Hsi-Hu (蔡西湖) 2010-2018
10. Chen Wen-Ku (陳文顧) 2018–present

== Infrastructures ==
- Hsiahsing Power Plant
- Taihu Reservoir

== Tourist attractions ==
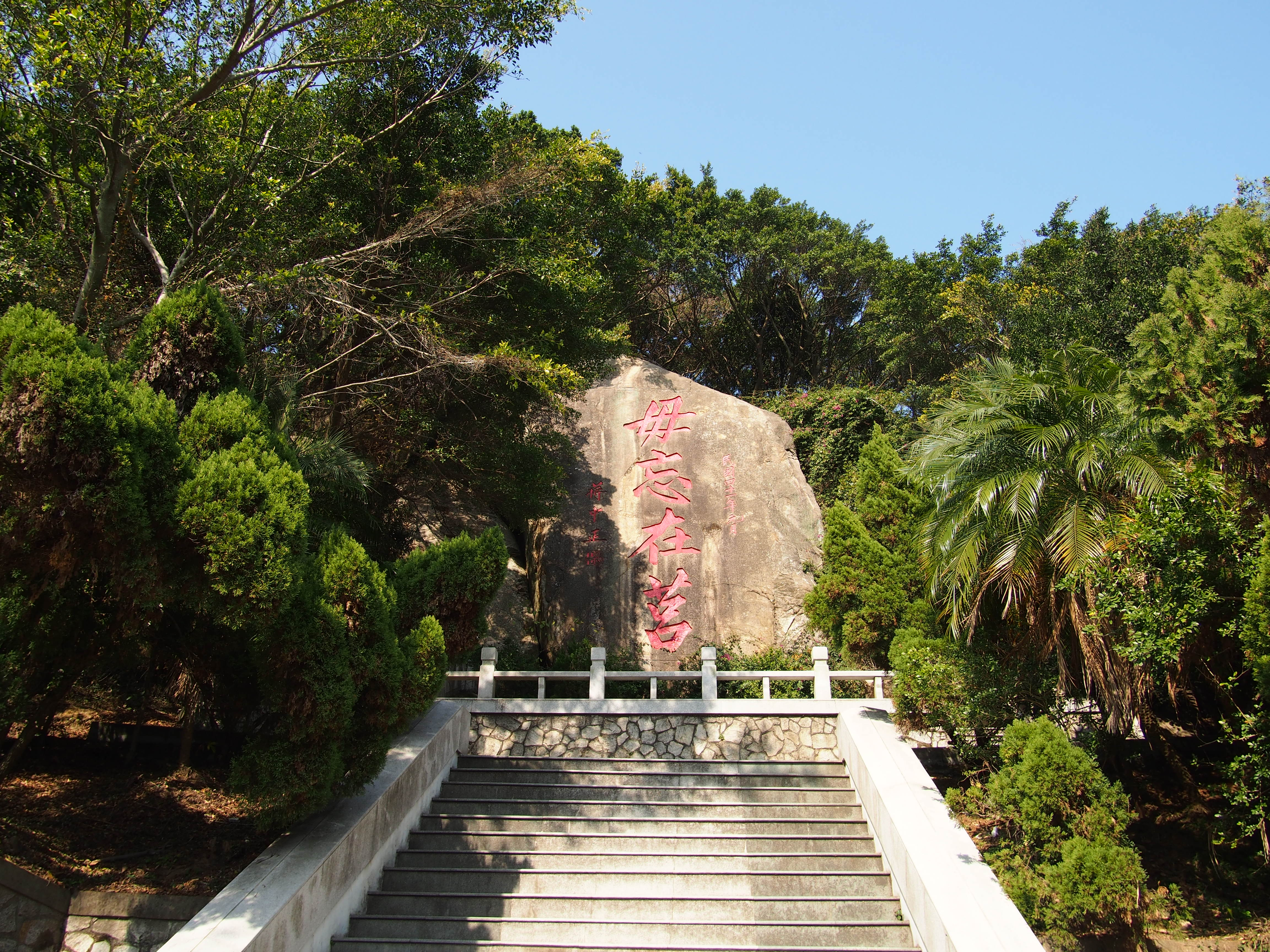
Wu-Wang-Zai-Ju Inscribed Rock at Taiwu Mountain

- August 23 Artillery Battle Museum
- Chenggong Coastal Defense Tunnel
- Chen Jing-lan Western House
- Kinmen Cultural Village
- Kinmen Ceramics Museum
- Kinmen National Park
- Qingtian Hall
- Qionglin Tunnel
- Yu Da Wei Xian Sheng Memorial Museum
- Wind Lion Plaza
- Wu-Wang-Zai-Ju Inscribed Rock
- Zhongzheng Park

== Transportation ==
- Kinmen Airport

== Notable natives ==
- Chern Jenn-chuan, Minister of Public Construction Commission (2012-2013)

== See also ==
- List of islands of Taiwan
