= Second Taiwan Strait Crisis =

1958 conflict between the PRC and the ROC

← 1st Second Taiwan Strait Crisis 3rd →
- Part of the cross-strait conflict
- Location of the territories controlled by the ROC for their Fuchien province
| Date | 23 August – 2 December 1958 (3 months, 1 week and 2 days) |
| Location | Kinmen County and the Matsu Islands |
| Result | Inconclusive: Republic of China successfully defends Kinmen; People's Republic of China continues to intermittently bombard Kinmen until establishing diplomatic relations with the United States in 1979 |

Belligerents
| Republic of China (Taiwan); Supported by: United States | People's Republic of China |

Commanders and leaders
| Chiang Kai-shek; Chiang Ching-kuo; Hu Lien; Ji Xingwen †; Zhao Jiaxiang †; Zhang Jie †; Dwight D. Eisenhower; Nathan Farragut Twining; Wallace M. Beakley; Benjamin O. Davis Jr.; Roland N. Smoot | Mao Zedong; Peng Dehuai; Ye Fei; Xu Xiangqian |

Units involved
| Republic of China Armed Forces; United States Armed Forces | People's Liberation Army |

Strength
| 92,000; Naval and air support | 215,000 |

Casualties and losses
| 514 ROC troops killed and missing, 2,200 injured (including 440 dead and missing and 1,911 injured for the Army alone); Civilians: 80 killed, 221 injured; 1 Landing Ship Medium sunk, 1 Landing Ship Tank damaged in the naval battle of Dongding Island | 460 PRC troops killed and wounded; Several ships sunk and several more damaged in the naval battle of Dongding Island; 31 fighter jets shot down |

Second Taiwan Strait Crisis
- Traditional Chinese: 八二三炮戰
- Simplified Chinese: 八二三炮战
- Literal meaning: August 23 shelling war
Transcriptions
Standard Mandarin
- Hanyu Pinyin: bā èr sān pào zhàn
- Bopomofo: ㄅㄚ ㄦˋ ㄙㄢ ㄆㄠˋ ㄓㄢˋ
- Wade–Giles: Pa^{1}-erh^{4}-san^{1} P'ao^{4}-chan^{4}

Alternative Chinese name
- Traditional Chinese: 金門炮戰
- Simplified Chinese: 金门炮战
- Literal meaning: Kinmen shelling war
Transcriptions
Standard Mandarin
- Hanyu Pinyin: jīn mén pào zhàn
- Bopomofo: ㄐㄧㄣ ㄇㄣˊ ㄆㄠˊ ㄓㄢˋ
- Wade–Giles: Chin^{1}-mên^{2} P'ao^{4}-chan^{4}

The Second Taiwan Strait Crisis, also known as the 1958 Taiwan Strait Crisis, was a conflict between the People's Republic of China (PRC) and the Republic of China (ROC). The PRC shelled the islands of Kinmen (Quemoy) and the Matsu Islands along the east coast of mainland China in an attempt to take them from the ROC, governed by the Kuomintang (KMT), and to probe the extent of American commitment to defend the Republic of China. The conflict also involved air, naval, and amphibious operations. Then U.S. secretary of state Christian Herter reportedly described it as the "first serious nuclear crisis".

== Background ==
The conflict was a continuation of the Chinese Civil War and First Taiwan Strait Crisis. The Republic of China (ROC) had begun to build military installations on the island of Kinmen (Quemoy) and the Matsu archipelago. The Chinese People's Liberation Army (PLA) began firing artillery at both Kinmen and some of the nearby Matsu islands.

== Conflict ==
On 24 and 25 August 1958 Chinese Communist forces and Nationalist forces clashed in the vicinity of Dongding Island, which the Nationalist troops controlled. The action was seen as an attempt by the communists to land on the island. This was the only naval and amphibious landing action during the crisis. The communist forces were repelled from taking the island. The action has also been seen as an attempt to draw Nationalist forces away from other areas.

... on the 24th two night naval engagements took place near Quemoy. The clashes resulted from a Chinese Communist attempt at landing on the small island of Tung-Ting in the Quemoy complex. The first attack involved four Chinese Communist gunboats and six small landing craft while the second involved five Chinese Communist gunboats and thirty motorized junks. According to the GRC Ministry of National Defense, several enemy ships were sunk and the attack was driven off by seven Chinese Nationalist Patrol craft. The GRC lost one LSM (landing craft, mechanized) and had one LST (landing ship, tank) damaged. Prior to September 3, when they were advised of U.S. escort plans, the Nationalists made five attempts to land an LST with troop replacements and several ships. These efforts were turned back by Chinese Communist PT boats and artillery fire.

In the days after shelling began, the American Joint Chiefs of Staff had determined to defend the islands even if the defense necessitated a nuclear response. Throughout the following weeks as the crisis continued to unfold, contingency plans were developed as it became clear that the critical issue was supplying Kinmen. In a meeting on 2 September, Secretary of State John Foster Dulles met with the Joint Chiefs of Staff and other top officials to formulate an ongoing American strategy. The group determined that the use of nuclear weapons would ultimately be necessary for the defense of Kinmen, but that the United States should initially limit itself to using conventional forces. Throughout the crisis, coordination between American policymakers and military commanders was hampered by communication delays of days at a time, but by September American officials had authorized naval escorts to accompany ROC convoys up to 3 miles off Kinmen and begun to supply the ROC with advanced weapons. The Chinese Communists considered the escorts a violation of the territorial waters of the People's Republic of China. On 19 September, Soviet Premier Nikita Khrushchev sent a letter warning that the American actions threatened world war, claiming that the Soviet Union would be forced to honor its commitments to the territorial integrity of Communist China. The letter was rejected by the American government.

The Eisenhower Administration responded to the request for aid from the ROC according to its obligations in the ROC-United States mutual defense treaty that had been ratified in 1954. President Dwight D. Eisenhower ordered the reinforcement of the U.S. Navy Seventh Fleet in the area, and he ordered American naval vessels to help the Nationalist Chinese government to protect the supply lines to the islands. In addition, the U.S. Air Force deployed F-100D Super Sabres, F-101C Voodoos, F-104A Starfighters, and B-57B Canberras to Taiwan to demonstrate support for Taiwan. The F-104s were disassembled and airlifted to Taiwan in C-124 Globemaster II transport aircraft, marking the first time such a method was used to move fighter aircraft over a long distance.

By 11 September, the artillery crisis was overall stabilized (even though numerous rounds of artillery would still be fired by Communist China almost daily for the next two months or so) because U.S. Navy warships started to escort ROC convoys to Kinmen, breaking the previous artillery blockade due to constant PRC artillery shells that prevented any air or naval relief for Kinmen. The PRC did not want to risk war with the United States so they refrained from firing on any convoys if they observed U.S. Navy ships. The biggest issues in the crisis after September 11 were the air battles and the success or failure of the naval convoys relieving the Kinmen garrison.

Landing units with LVTs from the ROC Marine Corps spent the next few months delivering supplies to the Kinmen Islands, starting from 10 September. Despite continued artillery fire from the PRC, the Marines were able to keep the islands supplied. For this action, the ROC Marines were later awarded a presidential banner from Chiang Kai-shek.

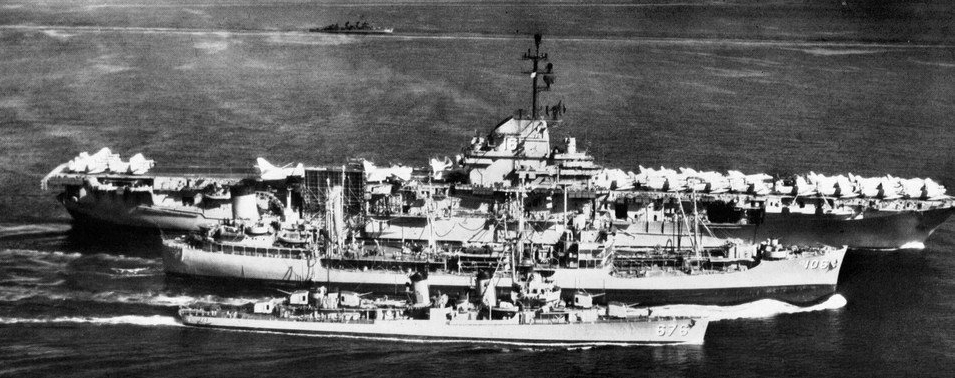
The U.S. carrier USS Lexington (top) with a supply ship and USS Marshall (bottom) off Taiwan during the crisis

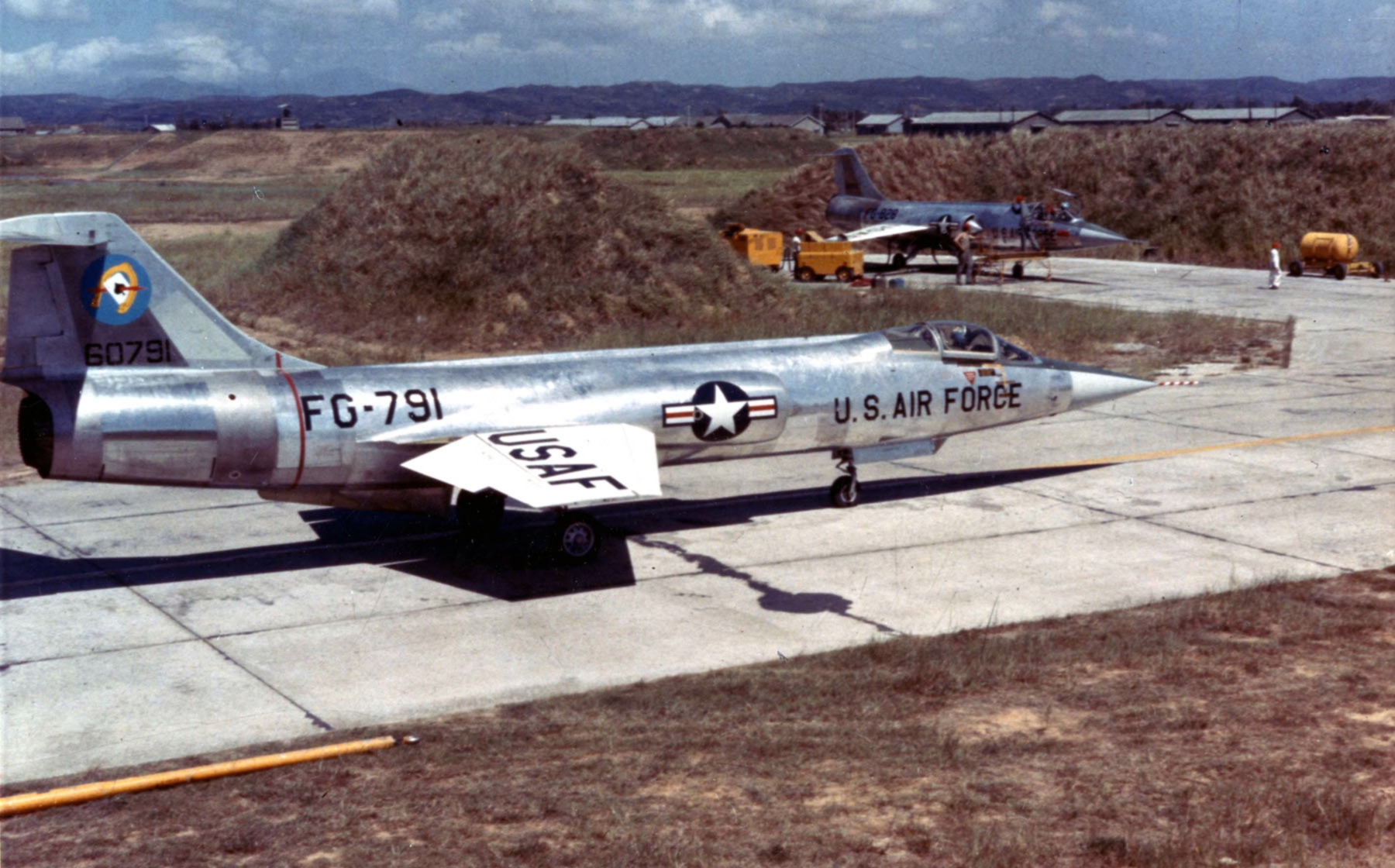
F-104As of the 83rd Fighter Interceptor Squadron at Taoyuan Air Base in September 1958.

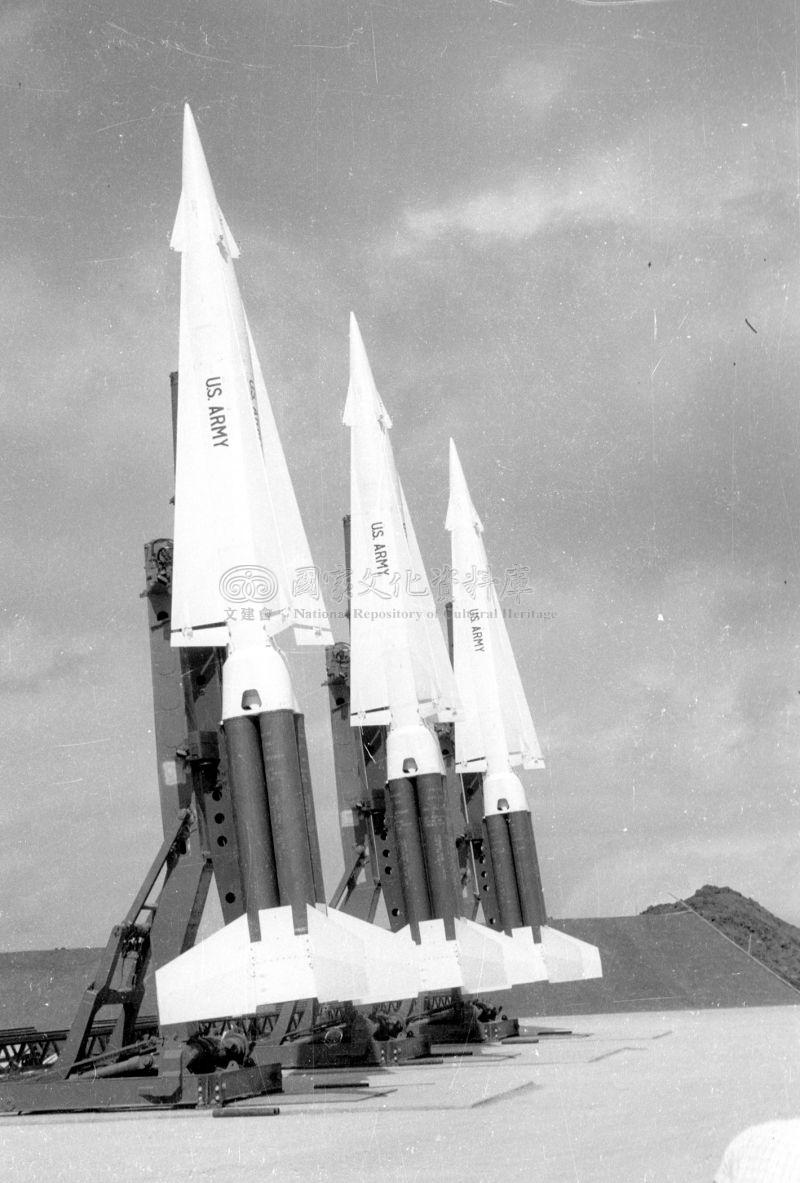
MIM-14 Nike Hercules of the 71st Air Defense Artillery Regiment, U.S Army, at Tamsui, Taipei County, on 20 October 1958

Also, under a secret effort called "Operation Black Magic", the U.S. Navy modified some of the F-86 Sabre fighters of the Nationalist Chinese Air Force with its newly developed early AIM-9 Sidewinder air-to-air missiles. These missiles gave the Nationalist Chinese pilots a decisive edge over the Chinese Communists' Soviet-made MiG-15 and MiG-17 fighters in the skies over the Matsu Islands and the Taiwan Strait. The Nationalist Chinese pilots used the Sidewinder missiles to score numerous kills on People's Liberation Army Air Force (PLAAF) MiG aircraft. The operation suffered blowback when one missile lodged in a MiG-17 without exploding, to be removed after landing and reverse-engineered into the Soviet K-13.

The US Army's contribution reinforced the strategic air defense capability of the Republic of China. A provisional Nike missile battalion was organized at Fort Bliss, TX, and sent via USMTS USS General J. C. Breckinridge to Nationalist China. The 2nd Missile Battalion was augmented with detachments of signal, ordnance and engineers, totaling some 704 personnel. In addition, American ambassador Everett Drumwright advocated for a preemptive strike against PRC positions.

Twelve long-range 203 mm (8.0 in) M115 howitzer artillery pieces and numerous 155 mm howitzers were transferred from the U.S. Marine Corps to the Republic of China Army. These were sent west to Kinmen Island to gain superiority in the artillery duel back and forth over the straits there.

Soon, the Soviet Union dispatched its foreign minister, Andrei Gromyko, to Beijing to discuss the actions of the PLA and the PLAAF, with advice of caution to the Communist Chinese.

On 24 September 1958 the Sidewinder missile was used for the first time in air-to-air combat as 32 Republic of China F-86s clashed with 100 PLAAF MiGs in a series of aerial engagements. 25 MiGs were shot down by Sidewinders, the first "kills" to be scored by air-to-air missiles in combat. In October more dogfights between ROC and PRC fighter jets occurred and the total airplane casualties during the crisis was 31 PRC MiGs shot down and 2 ROC F-86s shot down. From 30 September 1958 until 5 October 1958, the Marine Air Control Squadron No. 1 (MACS-1) was stationed at Ping Tung, Taiwan as support, rerouted from their position in the Philippines. One of the Radio Operators on board was Private Lee Harvey Oswald.

Soon, the People's Republic of China was faced with a stalemate, as the PLA's artillerymen had run out of artillery shells. The Communist Chinese government announced a unilateral ceasefire on 6 October 1958. However, on 20 October the PLA resumed artillery fire on Kinmen because a U.S. Navy warship had breached the PRC-declared 3 nautical miles exclusive zone from the coast of China that they claimed was a stipulation for their unilateral ceasefire agreement. Another more likely reason for the resumption of the PRC artillery bombardment was U.S. Secretary of State John Foster Dulles had arrived in Taipei to discuss the situation with the ROC government. The overall crisis finished by December 1958 when both the PRC and ROC troops settled into their eccentric alternating odd and even days firing period that lasted until 1979 when the United States and the PRC established diplomatic relations. Because both armies knew exactly what day, what time, and which areas would be attacked by artillery shells (military bases and artillery positions) the PRC and ROC troops were safe from harm due to hiding in bunkers thanks to this gentleman's agreement.

U.S. Marine Corps Marine Air Group 11 stationed at NAS Atsugi, Japan, was sent to Taiwan in March 1960 and landed at Kaohsiung, Taiwan, and moved via trucks to Pingtung Air Base about 40 kilometres (25 mi) north of Kaohsiung. They remained there, conducting air operations from the WWII Japanese air strip until sometime in late April 1960 when they returned to Atsugi, Japan. They were joined at Pingtung by a reinforced rifle company from the Ninth Marines based on Okinawa.

== Aftermath ==
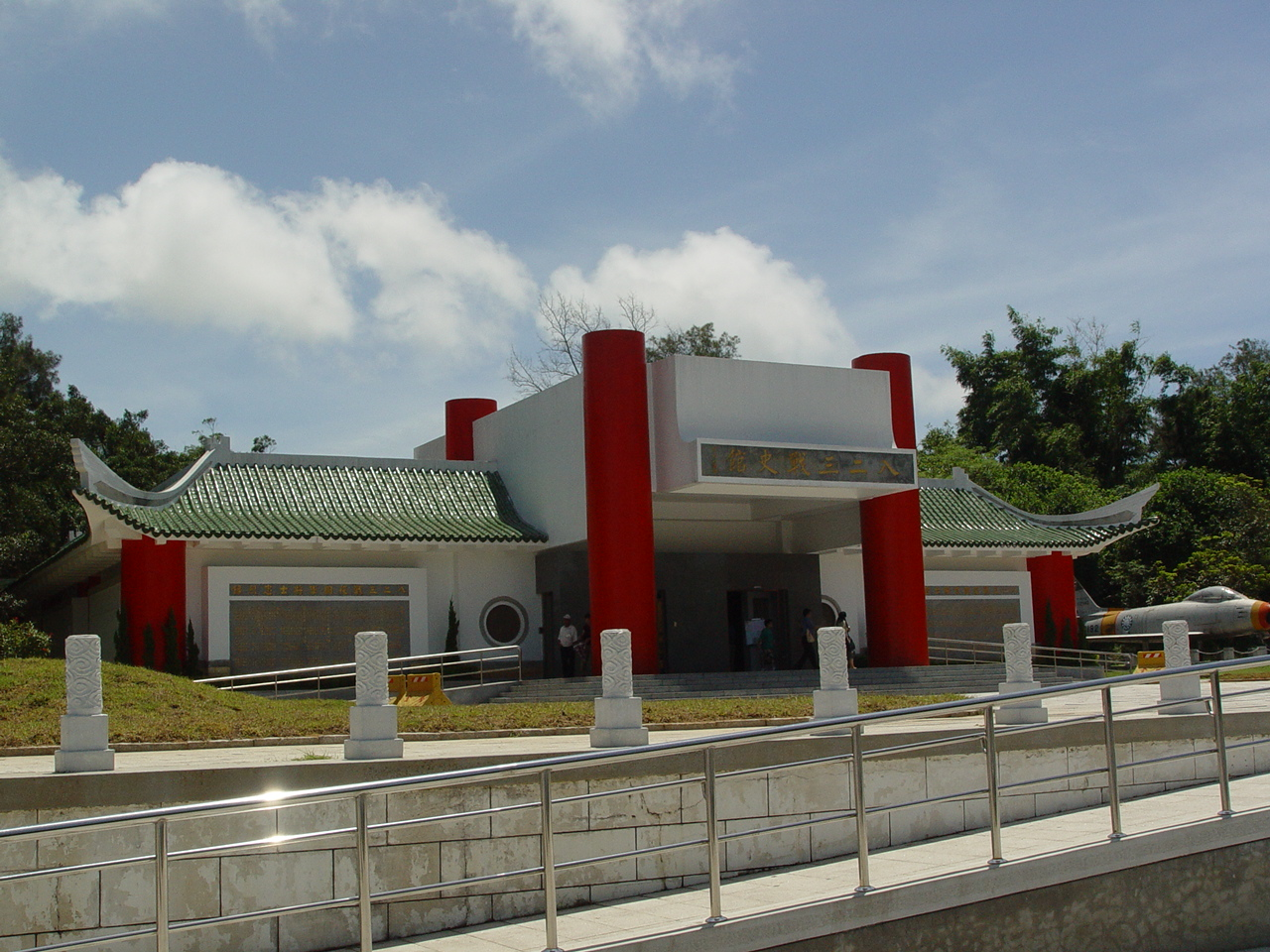
August 23 Artillery Battle Museum in Kinmen

"On 25 October [the Chinese Communists] ... declared that they would not fire on even-numbered days ... if there were no American escort." This allowed Taiwan to resupply their military units on those islands on those days. Afterwards, both sides continued to bombard each other with shells containing propaganda leaflets on alternate days of the week. This strange informal arrangement continued until the normalization of diplomatic relations between the United States and the Communist People's Republic of China in 1979. The timed shelling created little damage and casualties; it was mainly aimed at military compounds and artillery pieces. Sometimes during tense diplomatic moments PRC forces would revert to August/September 1958 levels of bombardment, temporarily breaking the normally scheduled non-lethal propaganda artillery shelling. One of these occasions happened in June 1960, when President Eisenhower visited Taipei. During Eisenhower's visit PRC forces fired over 100,000 artillery rounds onto Kinmen within a few days, killing 7 ROC soldiers and wounding 59, while 6 civilians perished and 15 were injured. ROC soldiers withheld their fire until after Eisenhower left Taipei. After his visit they retaliated by firing thousands of artillery rounds of their own onto mainland China from Kinmen. The PRC bombardment damaged 200 homes, five schools and a hospital on Kinmen, showing that during the 20-year period of mostly propaganda leaflets being fired by both sides it was still a very dangerous combat zone until 1979.

The crisis subsided and returned to status quo ante bellum on 2 December when the U.S. Navy secretly and quietly removed their extra warships from the Taiwan Strait and the ROC Navy resumed unilateral combat and escort duties. The defense of Quemoy and Matsu was a major topic of the 1960 United States presidential debates between Richard Nixon and John F. Kennedy.

On 23 August 2019, the sixty-first anniversary of the beginning of the Second Taiwan Strait Crisis, President Tsai Ing-wen visited the Taiwushan martyrs' shrine (太武山忠烈祠) where she placed flowers and offered incense.

During the crisis, American leadership risked the alienation of the American public, relations with key allies such as France and Japan, and even nuclear war. Secretary of State John Foster Dulles argued that while the status quo result was a victory, the American government could not permit such a situation to arise again.

== USAF Units deployed ==
On 28 August 1958, The U.S. Air Force launched the Composite Air Strike Force (CASF), code named X-Ray Tango.

312th Tactical Fighter Wing - Cannon Air Force Base, New Mexico

388th Tactical Fighter Squadron
477th Tactical Fighter Squadron

27th Tactical Fighter Wing - Bergstrom Air Force Base, Texas

522nd Tactical Fighter Squadron

345th Bombardment Wing - Langley Air Force Base, Virginia

499th Bombardment Squadron

314th Troop Carrier Wing - Sewart Air Force Base, Tennessee

50th Troop Carrier Squadron

463rd Troop Carrier Wing - Ardmore Air Force Base, Oklahoma

773d Troop Carrier Squadron

837th Air Division - Shaw Air Force Base, South Carolina

17th Tactical Reconnaissance Squadron
20th Tactical Reconnaissance Squadron

4505th Air Refueling Wing - Langley Air Force Base, Virginia

429th Air Refueling Squadron

507th Communications and Control Group - Shaw Air Force Base, South Carolina
2d Tactical Depot Squadron - Langley Air Force Base, Virginia

=== USAF Units Available to PACAF after Deployment ===
==== Deployed at Taiwan ====
83d Fighter-Interceptor Squadron - Taoyuan Air Base
26th Fighter-Interceptor Squadron - Hsinchu Airport
388th Tactical Fighter Squadron - Chiayi Air Base
16th Fighter-Interceptor Squadron - Tainan Air Base
868th Tactical Missile Squadron - Tainan Air Base
507th Communications and Control Group - Tainan Air Base

==== Deployed at Philippines ====
26th Fighter-Interceptor Squadron - Clark Air Base
72nd Tactical Fighter Squadron - Clark Air Base
50th Troop Carrier Squadron - Clark Air Base
17th Tactical Reconnaissance Squadron - Clark Air Base
429th Air Refueling Squadron - Clark Air Base

==== Deployed at Ryukyu Islands ====
25th Fighter-Interceptor Squadron - Naha Air Base
522nd Tactical Fighter Squadron - Kadena Air Base
477th Tactical Fighter Squadron - Kadena Air Base
499th Bombardment Squadron - Kadena Air Base
20th Tactical Reconnaissance Squadron - Kadena Air Base
429th Air Refueling Squadron - Naha Air Base

==== Deployed at Japan ====
773rd Troop Carrier Squadron - Ashiya Air Base

== See also ==
- First Taiwan Strait Crisis
- Third Taiwan Strait Crisis
- Fourth Taiwan Strait Crisis
- Chinese Civil War
- Republic of China Armed Forces
- Kinmen knife
- Dongding Island
- The Kinmen Bombs, a Taiwanese film set in the Second Taiwan Strait Crisis
