= Jinjiang–Kinmen Pipeline =

Water pipeline connecting Jinjiang and Kinmen

The Jinjiang–Kinmen Pipeline is a pipeline that supplies drinking water from Jinjiang City in Fujian, People's Republic of China (PRC), to neighboring Kinmen County in Fuchien, Republic of China (ROC, Taiwan). Established in 2018, it is notable for being a direct, essential supply of a strategic resource from China to Taiwan, especially considering the complexities of cross-strait relations.

== Background ==
Being a small island county, Kinmen had been facing water scarcity problems for years. In 2013, the county drew more than 8,000 tonnes of groundwater every day. Reservoirs were barely sufficient to supply water during dry season. The Kinmen County Government considered seawater desalination as one of several options. However, the cost of desalination was too much for the county government to bear. Therefore, purchasing water from mainland China was the most feasible solution.

== History ==
Kinmen County first expressed their intention to purchase water from mainland China in 1996 when it suffered from severe drought. In 2000, the Water Resources Bureau accessed the idea of creating such infrastructure project. In June 2013, Taiwan and mainland China agreed to cooperate to solve the water shortage in Kinmen during the Cross-Strait Service Trade Agreement in Shanghai. In late August 2013, a delegation from Kinmen County led by Kinmen County Deputy Commissioner Wu You-qin (吳友欽) held talks with their mainland counterparts in mainland China. In 2014, the Executive Yuan gave approval for the Jinjiang–Kinmen Pipeline project. On 23–24 May 2015, Head of Taiwan Affairs Office Zhang Zhijun visited Kinmen to discuss the water supply plan from Fujian to Kinmen while touring the Tianpu Reservoir. Later in July 2015, both sides signed the agreement for mainland China to supply drinking water to Kinmen by the water authorities of both sides.

=== Inauguration ceremony ===
The water started its maiden supply on 5 August 2018 in a ceremony named Cross-Strait Water Supply Ceremony in Chinese language which was attended by Kinmen County Magistrate Chen Fu-hai and Kinmen County Constituency Legislator Yang Cheng-wu.

Separately at the same day in mainland China, a separate ceremony was held at Jinjiang City which was attended by Taiwan Affairs Office Director Liu Jieyi, former Fujian Province Governor Yu Weiguo and more than 20 councilors of Kinmen County Council.

== Technical specification ==
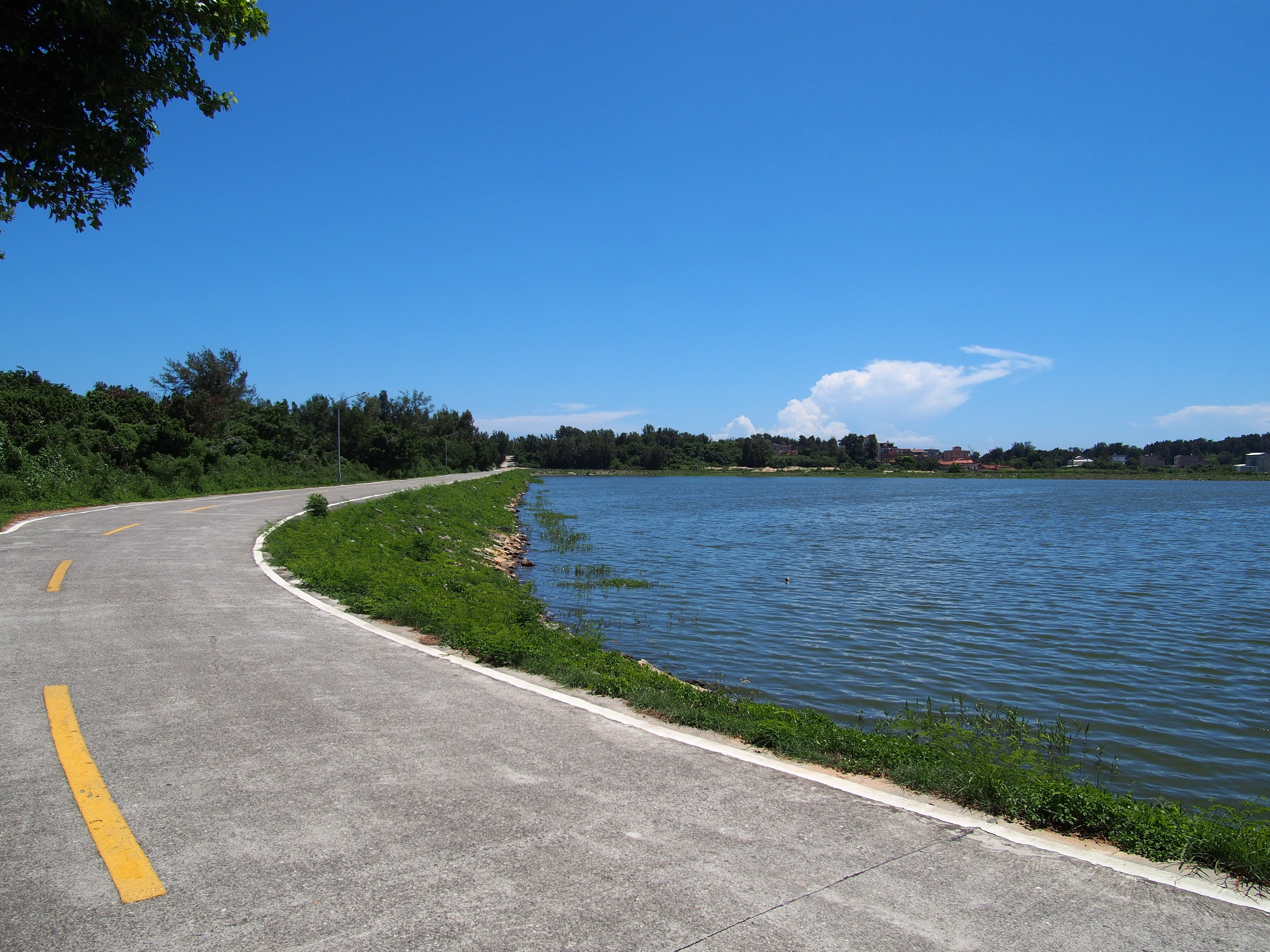
Tianpu Reservoir

From mainland China, the water is mainly sourced from the lake of Longhu (龙湖) which has a capacity of 655 million m^{3} of water. The lake is the second largest lake in Fujian. From the lake, the water goes to a water pumping station and transported inland to the coastal city of Bingzhou before being transported through an undersea pipe which spans over a length of 16.7 km through the straits separating mainland China and Kinmen. After reaching Kinmen Island, the pipeline goes for another 300 meters inland to a water treatment plant before supplying the Tianpu Reservoir. The maximum capacity of the pipe can reach up to 55,000 tonnes per day.

== Finance ==
Both sides signed an agreement on a 30-year water purchase agreement. Under the agreement, Kinmen imports at an average of 34,000 tonnes of water per day at a cost of NT$9.86 per cubic meter of water. The total cost for the pipeline construction was NT$1.35 billion.

== See also ==
- Water supply and sanitation in Taiwan
- Cross-Strait relations
