= Kinmen County Constituency =

Constituency of the Legislative Yuan of Taiwan

- Single-member constituency for the Legislative Yuan
- District(s): Kinmen
- Electorate: 124,669 (2024 election)

Current constituency
- Created: 1992
- Party: KMT
- Member: Chen Yu-jen

Kinmen County Constituency (Chinese: 金門縣選舉區; pinyin: Jīnmén Xiàn Xuǎnjǔ Qū) is one of the 73 regional constituencies represented in the Legislative Yuan, the national legislature of Taiwan. It was created in 1992 following a series of constitutional reforms, and elects one legislator, through first-past-the-post voting, to the Legislative Yuan. It has been represented by Chen Yu-jen of the Kuomintang since 2019.

== Legislators ==
Election	Legislator	Party
1992 - 1995	Chen Ching-pao	Independent
1995 - 2001	Chen Ching-pao	Kuomintang
2001 - 2008	Wu Cherng-dean	New Party
2008 - 2011	Chen Fu-hai	Independent
2011 - 2012	Chen Fu-hai	People First Party
2012 - 2016	Yang Ying-hsiung	Kuomintang
2016 - 2019	Yang Cheng-wu (Note: Yang Cheng-wu resigned in 2018 after elected Kinmen County magistrate.)	Kuomintang
2019 - 2020	Chen Yu-jen	Independent
2020	Chen Yu-jen	Kuomintang

== Election results ==

=== 1995 ===
* denotes the incumbent legislator

1995 Taiwanese legislative election: Kinmen
Candidate	Party	Votes	%
Chen Ching-pao*	Kuomintang	11,041	52.74
Wu Cherng-dean	New Party	6,996	33.42
Chen Yun-huo	Independent	1,854	8.86
Chang Tien-chin	Democratic Progressive Party	578	2.76
Hsu Shui-tseng	Independent	465	2.22
Total		20,934	100.00
Valid votes		20,934	98.86
Invalid/blank votes		242	1.14
Total votes		21,176	100.00
Registered voters/turnout		29,852	70.94
Majority		4,045	19.32
Kuomintang gain from Independent			

=== 1998 ===
* denotes the incumbent legislator

1998 Taiwanese legislative election: Kinmen
Candidate	Party	Votes	%	+/–
Chen Ching-pao*	Kuomintang	9,097	44.76	▼7.98
Li Cheng-I	Independent	7,931	39.02	NEW
Hsu Chin-tu	Independent	1,786	8.79	NEW
Chen Yao-hui	New Party	1,146	5.64	▼27.78
Chen Kuo-yao	Independent	364	1.79	NEW
Total		20,324	100.00	–
Valid votes		20,324	98.35	
Invalid/blank votes		341	1.65	
Total votes		20,665	100.00	
Registered voters/turnout		34,316	60.22	
Majority		1,166	5.74	
Kuomintang hold				

=== 2001 ===
* denotes the incumbent legislator

2001 Taiwanese legislative election: Kinmen
Candidate	Party	Votes	%	+/–
Wu Cherng-dean	New Party	10,292	41.13	▲35.49
Yang Su-yuan	People First Party	5,874	23.47	NEW
Chen Ching-pao*	Kuomintang	3,923	15.68	▼29.08
Chen Shui-tsai	Independent	3,523	14.08	NEW
Chen Tsang-chiang	Democratic Progressive Party	1,413	5.65	NEW
Total		25,025	100.00	–
Valid votes		25,025	97.44	
Invalid/blank votes		657	2.56	
Total votes		25,682	100.00	
Registered voters/turnout		39,922	64.33	
Majority		4,418	17.66	
New Party gain from Kuomintang				

=== 2004 ===
* denotes the incumbent legislator

2004 Taiwanese legislative election: Kinmen
Candidate	Party	Votes	%	+/–
Wu Cherng-dean*	New Party	12,137	54.07	▲12.94
Li Cheng-I	Non-Partisan Solidarity Union	5,544	24.70	NEW
Chen Ching-pao	Independent	3,436	15.31	NEW
Weng Ming-chih	Democratic Progressive Party	1,329	5.92	▲0.27
Total		22,446	100.00	–
Valid votes		22,446	98.81	
Invalid/blank votes		270	1.19	
Total votes		22,716	100.00	
Registered voters/turnout		46,449	48.91	
Majority		6,593	29.37	
New Party hold				

=== 2008 ===
* denotes the incumbent legislator

2008 Taiwanese legislative election: Kinmen
Candidate	Party	Votes	%	+/–
Chen Fu-hai	Independent	9,912	37.31	NEW
Wu Cherng-dean*	Kuomintang	9,838	37.04	NEW
Lee Wo-shih	Independent	5,274	19.85	NEW
Hu Wei-sheng	Independent	1,070	4.03	NEW
Tang Hui-pei	Democratic Progressive Party	431	1.62	▼4.30
Kao Hsien-teng	Civil Party	39	0.15	NEW
Total		26,564	100.00	–
Valid votes		26,564	98.36	
Invalid/blank votes		443	1.64	
Total votes		27,007	100.00	
Registered voters/turnout		63,451	42.56	
Majority		74	0.27	
Independent gain from New Party				

=== 2012 ===
* denotes the incumbent legislator

2012 Taiwanese legislative election: Kinmen
Candidate	Party	Votes	%	+/–
Yang Ying-hsiung	Kuomintang	12,435	32.96	▼4.08
Chen Fu-hai*	People First Party	12,128	32.15	NEW
Wu Cherng-dean	New Party	10,678	28.30	NEW
Hsu Nai-chuan	Independent	2,260	5.99	NEW
Kao Hsien-teng	National Health Service Alliance	228	0.60	NEW
Total		37,729	100.00	–
Valid votes		37,729	97.35	
Invalid/blank votes		1,027	2.65	
Total votes		38,756	100.00	
Registered voters/turnout		81,783	47.39	
Majority		307	0.81	
Kuomintang gain from Independent				

=== 2016 ===
2016 Taiwanese legislative election: Kinmen
Candidate	Party	Votes	%	+/–
Yang Cheng-wu	Kuomintang	16,350	45.08	▲12.12
Wu Cherng-dean	New Party	9,405	25.93	▼2.37
Chen Tsang-chiang	Democratic Progressive Party	8,367	23.07	NEW
Chang Chung-fa	Independent	670	1.85	NEW
Kao Tan-hua	Military, Civil and Faculty Alliance Party	666	1.84	NEW
Hung Chih-heng	Independent	647	1.78	NEW
Chen Te-hui	Taiwan Labor Party (Note: Not affiliated with Labor Party)	113	0.31	NEW
Chen Chung-li	Independent	49	0.14	NEW
Total		36,267	100.00	–
Valid votes		36,267	97.98	
Invalid/blank votes		747	2.02	
Total votes		37,014	100.00	
Registered voters/turnout		109,478	33.81	
Majority		6,945	19.15	
Kuomintang hold				

=== 2019 by-election ===
Called due to incumbent legislator Yang Cheng-wu being elected as Magistrate of Kinmen.

2019 Taiwanese legislative by-elections: Kinmen
Candidate	Party	Votes	%	+/–
Chen Yu-jen	Independent (Note: Membership revoked by the Kuomintang for competing in the by-election)	7,117	28.69	NEW
Chen Tsang-chiang	Independent (Note: Pan-Green independent)	6,020	24.27	NEW
Hung Li-ping	Kuomintang	5,681	22.90	▼22.18
Tsai Hsi-hu	Independent (Note: Membership revoked by the Kuomintang for competing in the by-election)	5,175	20.86	NEW
Lu Kuan-yu	Independent	570	2.30	NEW
Hung Chih-heng	Kinmen Kao-liang Party	240	0.97	NEW
Total		24,803	100.00	–
Valid votes		24,803	99.34	
Invalid/blank votes		165	0.66	
Total votes		24,968	100.00	
Registered voters/turnout		117,730	21.21	
Majority		1,097	4.42	
Independent gain from Kuomintang				

=== 2020 ===
* denotes the incumbent legislator

2020 Taiwanese legislative election: Kinmen
Candidate	Party	Votes	%	+/–
Chen Yu-jen*	Kuomintang	21,875	46.64	▲23.74
Chen Fu-hai	Independent (Note: Pan-Blue independent]])	13,801	29.42	NEW
Chen Tsang-chiang	Independent (Note: Pan-Green independent]])	7,303	15.57	▼8.70
Hung Chen	Taiwan Statebuilding Party	1,627	3.47	NEW
Hung Chih-heng	Kinmen Kao-liang Party	899	1.92	▲0.95
Hsu Pi-ken	Chinese New Inhabitant Party	428	0.91	NEW
Cheng Yao-te	Chinese Unification Promotion Party	311	0.66	NEW
Hung Ho-chen	Independent	283	0.60	NEW
Lin Chih-chin	Independent	264	0.56	NEW
Lu Yueh-hsiang	Chinese Production Party	112	0.24	NEW
Total		46,903	100.00	–
Valid votes		46,903	96.31	
Invalid/blank votes		1,798	3.69	
Total votes		48,701	100.00	
Registered voters/turnout		119,092	40.89	
Majority		8,074	17.22	
Kuomintang gain from Independent				

=== 2024 ===
* denotes the incumbent legislator

2024 Taiwanese legislative election: Kinmen
Candidate	Party	Votes	%	+/–
Chen Yu-jen*	Kuomintang	28,846	65.28	▲18.64
Shang Wen-kai	Taiwan People's Party	13,177	29.82	NEW
Hung Ho-cheng	Independent	2,168	4.91	▲4.31
Total		44,191	100.00	–
Valid votes		44,191	97.22	
Invalid/blank votes		1,263	2.78	
Total votes		45,454	100.00	
Registered voters/turnout		124,669	36.46	
Majority		15,669	35.46	
Kuomintang hold				
