= Chen Yu-jen =

Taiwanese politician

- 陳玉珍
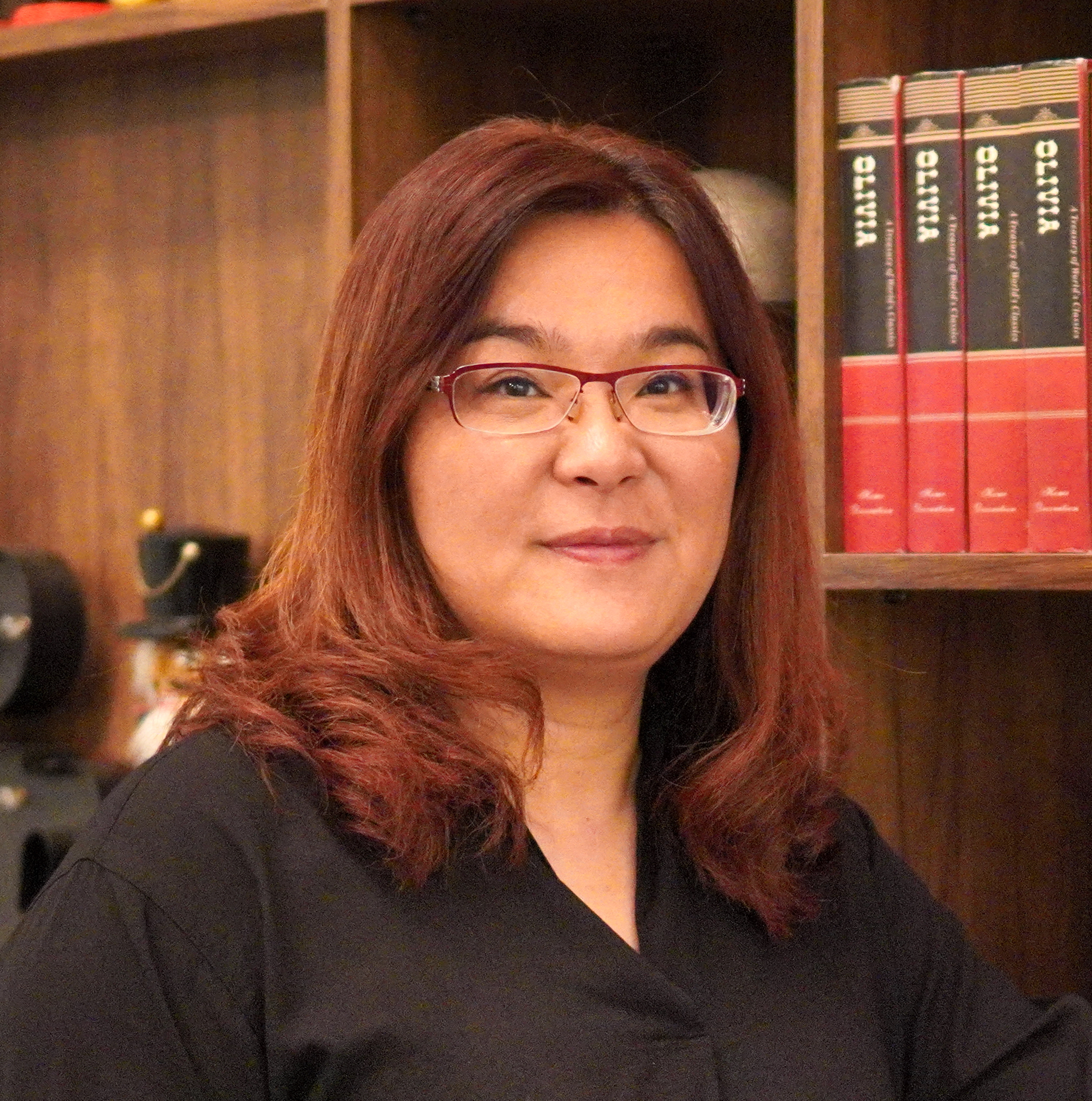
- Chen in 2020

Member of the Legislative Yuan
- Incumbent
- Assumed office 21 March 2019
- Preceded by: Yang Cheng-wu
- Constituency: Kinmen County

Kinmen County Councillor
- In office 25 December 2014 – 25 December 2018
- Constituency: Jinhu Township

Personal details
- Born: October 29, 1973 (age 53) Kinmen County, Taiwan
- Party: Kuomintang
- Education: National Taiwan University (BA); Peking University (LLM); Kyushu University (LLM); Harvard University (MPP)

Chen Yu-jen (Chinese: 陳玉珍; pinyin: Chén Yùzhēn; born 29 October 1973), also known as Jessica Chen, is a Taiwanese politician and lawyer who has served as a member of the Legislative Yuan representing Kinmen County since 2019. She was previously a member of the Kinmen County Council from 2014 to 2018.

== Early life and education ==
Chen was born on 29 October 1973 in Kinmen, Taiwan. Her father, Chen Shui-mu (陳水木), served as speaker of the Kinmen County Council. Chen has an older sister, Chen Yu-ling (陳玉玲), and a younger brother, Chen Chi-lung (陳志龍), who also served on the Kinmen County Council. After attending a gifted children's program in junior high school, she graduated from Kinmen High School in 1991 as the top female student of her class.

After high school, Chen graduated from National Taiwan University with a Bachelor of Arts in Chinese literature with a minor in law in 1995, and spent a summer studying English at Harvard University. During her time in the U.S., Chen traveled to New York, Washington, and Florida. She left the U.S. in February 1996 to enroll at Peking University and earned a Master of Laws (LL.M.) from the Peking University Law School, where she had studied international law, public international law, international economic law, and the World Trade Organization. Her master's thesis, completed under jurist Wang Tieya, was titled, "A study of the Chinese telecommunications market based on foreign investment regulations in China, the U.S., and Japan".

After graduating from Peking University, Chen received a scholarship to study law in Japan and earned a second LL.M. in international economic law from Kyushu University in 1998. In October 2017, Chen began studying at the Harvard Kennedy School, where she earned a degree in government and public policy.

== Legislative Yuan ==
=== 2019 by-election ===
On 18 January 2019, the final day of registration, Chen registered as a candidate in the by-election for the Kinmen County seat in the 9th Legislative Yuan. The Kuomintang (KMT) nominated Hung Li-ping for the seat, and Chen was expelled from the party after she insisted on running. In the 2018 Kinmen County magistrate election, Chen had stepped aside in favor of the KMT candidate Yang Cheng-wu. During the by-election campaign, Chen ran on the rights of labourers, teachers and civil servants. Running as an independent, Chen won the six-candidate race on 16 March 2019 with 7,117 votes, ahead of Chen Tsang-chiang with 6,020 votes and Hung with 5,681 votes. She was a dark horse candidate and became the first woman to be elected legislator for Kinmen.

On 14 August 2019, the KMT Central Standing Committee reduced her penalty to a three-month suspension of party rights counted from the date her membership was revoked, which restored her KMT membership.

=== 10th Legislative Yuan (2020–2024) ===
In the 2020 legislative election, Chen ran for re-election as the KMT candidate in a ten-candidate race in Kinmen and declared victory at around 5 p.m. on election day. Former Kinmen County magistrate Chen Fu-hai contested the seat in 2020 but lost to Chen. Her term in the 10th Legislative Yuan began on 1 February 2020. During the 10th Legislative Yuan, Chen sat on committees including the Internal Administration Committee, the Social Welfare and Environmental Hygiene Committee, and the Judiciary and Organic Laws and Statutes Committee.

=== 11th Legislative Yuan (2024–present) ===
Chen won re-election in the Kinmen County constituency in the 2024 legislative election. Her term in the 11th Legislative Yuan began on 1 February 2024. On 1 August 2024, Chen became chair of the KMT's Kinmen County chapter. In February 2025, a campaign to recall Chen, organized by a group called "Chen Obstructs Kinmen", ended after organizers said they could not gather the required support before amendments to the recall law took effect.

== 2026 Kinmen County magistrate campaign ==
Chen was the only person to register during the KMT's 25–27 February 2026 registration period for its Kinmen County magistrate nomination, and so no primary was held. The KMT Central Standing Committee then nominated Chen for Kinmen County magistrate. In September 2026, former Kinmen County magistrate Yang Cheng-wu withdrew from the race, leaving Chen as the primary KMT candidate. In October 2026, Chen resigned as chair of the KMT's Kinmen County chapter to focus on the race.
