= Wang Chin-cheng's Western House =

Former residence in Jinsha, Kinmen, Taiwan

Beishan Old Western-style House
- 王金城洋樓
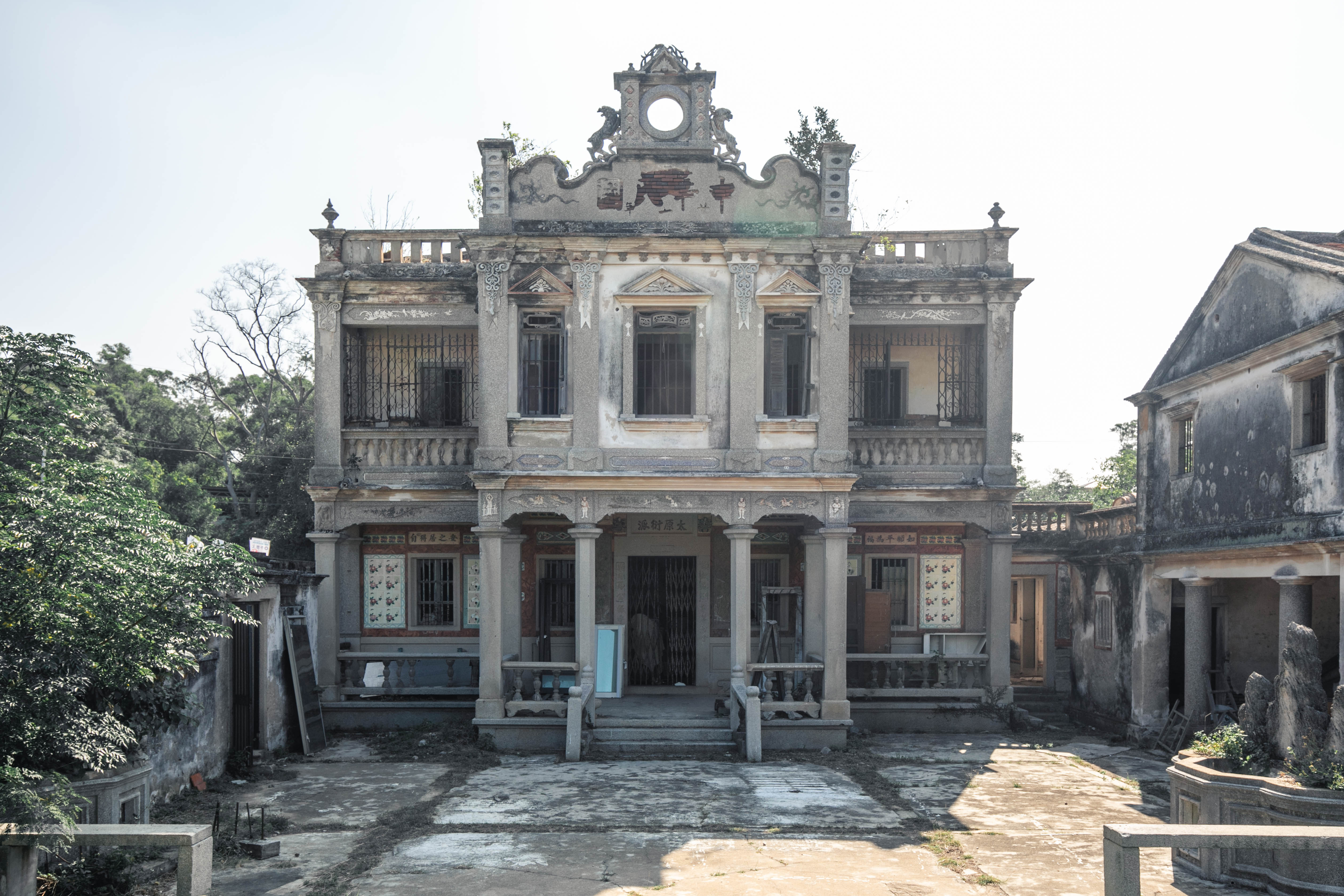
- Interactive map of the Beishan Old Western-style House area

General information
- Type: house
- Location: Jinsha, Kinmen, Taiwan
- Coordinates: 24°28′53.3″N 118°23′40.9″E
- Completed: 1932

The Beishan Old Western-style House (traditional Chinese: 王金城洋樓; simplified Chinese: 王金城洋楼; pinyin: Wáng Jīnchéng Yáng Lóu) is a historical house in Jinsha Township, Kinmen County, Taiwan.

== History ==
Construction of the house began around 1918 or 1919 for the Wang family and was completed in 1932. The house was seized by the Imperial Japanese Army in 1937 and returned to the family in 1946. In 1954, the house was taken by the Republic of China Army. From 1956 to 1965, it was used as a storage depot for engineering materials. In 2015, the house was declared a historical building. On 29 September 2021, restoration work on the house began in a ceremony attended by Magistrate Yang Cheng-wu and descendants of the original owners. The restoration work was expected to cost around NT$40 million.

== Architecture ==
The house was constructed with Western and Hokkien architectural elements. Its exterior walls feature relief sculptures and the front of the house features totems.

== See also ==
- List of tourist attractions in Taiwan
