= Wang Jin Cheng =

Wang Jin Cheng may refer to following individuals or places of which Hanzi name can be transliterated to Hanyu Pinyin:

- Ong Kim Seng (王金成 Wáng Jīnchéng; born 1945), Singapore artist
- Pura Kencana (旺金城 Wàng Jīn Chéng), also usually known as Pura Kencana, a township in Malaysia

== See also ==
- Wang Chin-cheng's Western House in Jinsha Township, Kinmen County, Taiwan
