= Yang Ying-hsiung =

Taiwanese politician

- 楊應雄
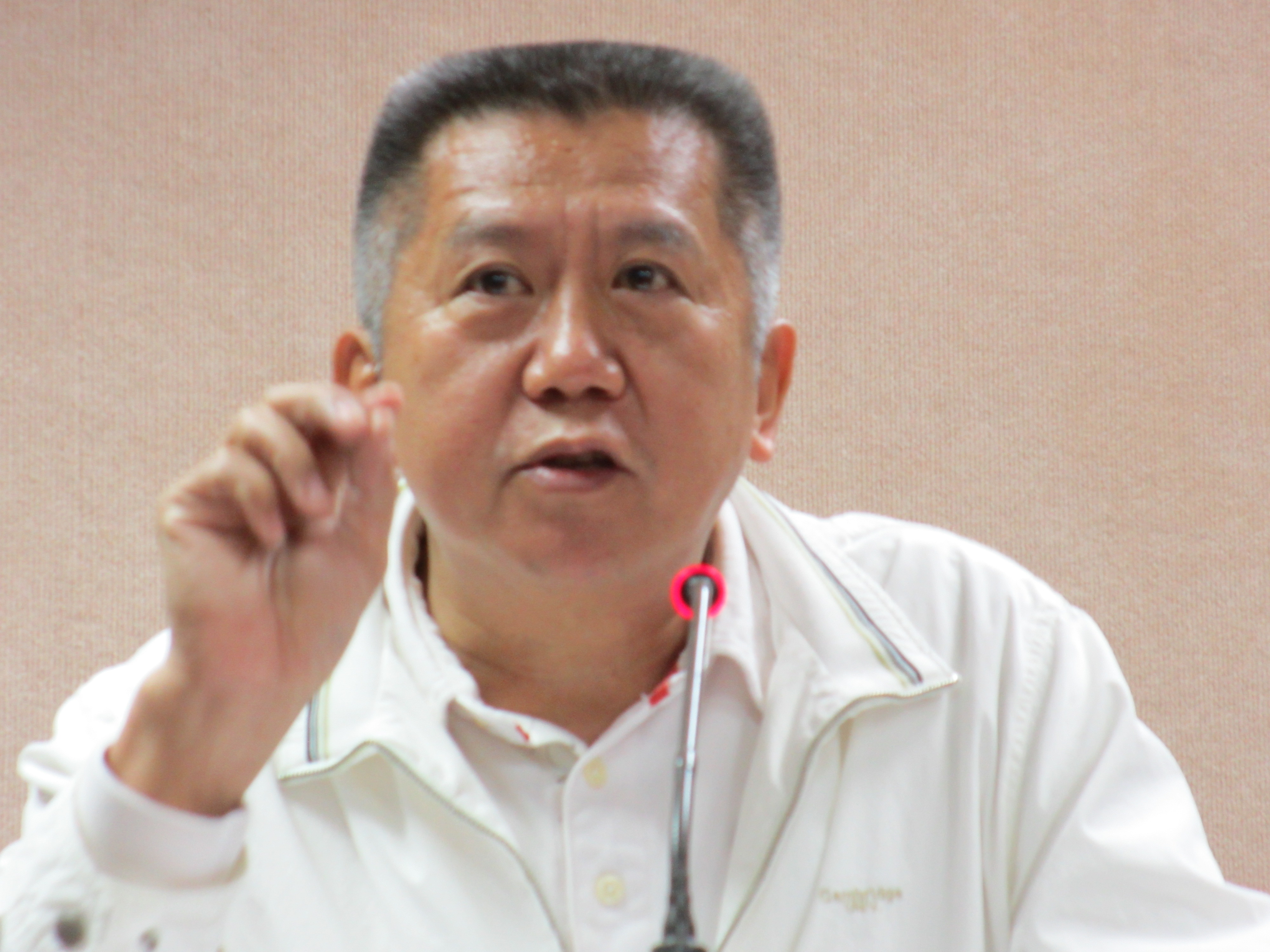
- Yang in March 2013

Member of the Legislative Yuan
- In office 1 February 2012 – 31 January 2016
- Preceded by: Chen Fu-hai
- Succeeded by: Yang Cheng-wu
- Constituency: Kinmen County

Personal details
- Born: 8 June 1957 (age 69) Kinmen, Fujian
- Party: Kuomintang
- Other political affiliations: New Party
- Education: Fu Jen Catholic University (BA); Xiamen University (MBA)

Yang Ying-hsiung (Chinese: 楊應雄; pinyin: Yáng Yīngxióng; born 8 June 1957) is a Taiwanese politician.

== Education ==
Yang attended Kinmen County Jin-sha Elementary School, Kinmen County Jin-Sha Junior High School and National Kinmen Senior High School. He completed a bachelor's degree in economics at Fu Jen Catholic University and a master's of business administration at Xiamen University.

== Political career ==
Yang won election to the Kinmen County Council in 2002 and 2005 while affiliated with the New Party. Yang won a third term as county councilor in 2009, representing the Kuomintang. He was elected to the Legislative Yuan in 2012, again under the Kuomintang banner.

In April 2012, Yang abstained from the first round of voting on a resolution banning the import and sale of beef from the United States. Although he voted against the resolution in the second round, the Kuomintang fined him and several other affiliated legislators. The total value of fines assessed was over NT$3 million, setting a record for the largest total fine in the Legislative Yuan's history. In 2013, Yang drew attention to rising airfares. During his legislative term, Yang commented often on foreign relations, specifically regarding Japan, and aid distributed to the Philippines after Typhoon Haiyan in 2013. Regarding the military, Yang opposed a withdrawal of forces from Dadan and Erdan Islands in 2013. Following unauthorized visits by private citizens to a military base housing Boeing AH-64 Apache helicopters in 2015, Yang questioned the status of military cooperation between Taiwan and the United States. While serving on the Legislative Yuan, Yang expressed support for the Kinmen County Government to pursue a deal on the supply of utilities from China.
