= Wu Cherng-dean =

Taiwanese politician and chemist

- 吳成典
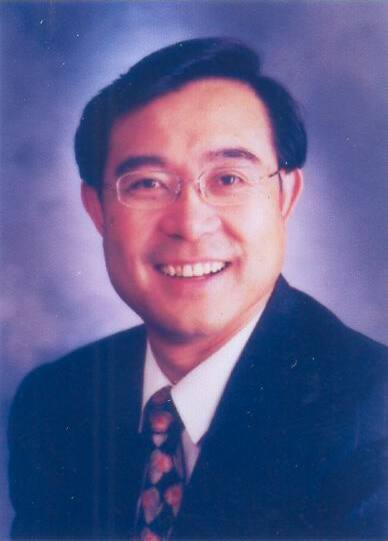

Chairman of the New Party
- Incumbent
- Assumed office 21 February 2020
- Preceded by: Yok Mu-ming

Deputy Magistrate of Kinmen County
- In office 16 June 2016 – 25 December 2018
- Magistrate: Chen Fu-hai
- In office 20 December 2001 – 31 January 2002
- Magistrate: Lee Chu-feng

Member of the Legislative Yuan
- In office 1 February 2002 – 31 January 2008
- Preceded by: Chen Ching-pao
- Succeeded by: Chen Fu-hai
- Constituency: Kinmen County

Personal details
- Born: 10 May 1957 (age 68) Lieyu, Kinmen County, Republic of China
- Party: New Party
- Education: Fu Jen Catholic University (BS); Case Western Reserve University (PhD)

Wu Cherng-dean (Chinese: 吳成典; pinyin: Wú Chéngdiǎn; Wade–Giles: Wu Ch'eng-tian; born 10 May 1957) is a Taiwanese politician and chemist who is currently the chairman of the New Party.

== Education ==
Wu graduated from Fu Jen Catholic University with a bachelor's degree in chemistry, then completed doctoral studies in the United States at Case Western Reserve University, where he earned his Ph.D. in chemistry. His doctoral dissertation was titled, "Electrochemical studies of redox systems for energy storage".

== Political career ==
Between 2003 and 2006, he was a member of the New Party and served as a legislator. In 2003 he and Sisy Chen joined the People First Party (PFP) legislative caucus. By 2007 he joined the Kuomintang.

=== 2014 Kinmen magistracy election ===
On 12 January 2008, he joined the 2008 legislative election as a Kuomintang candidate from Kinmen constituency. However, he narrowly lost the election.

No.	Candidate	Party	Votes	Ratio	Elected
1	Chen Fu-hai	Independent	9,912	37.31%	Yes
2	Lee Wo-shih	Independent	5,274	19.85%	
3	Gao Sian Teng (高絃騰)	Civil Party	39	0.15%	
4	Hu Wei Sheng (胡偉生)	Independent	1,070	4.03%	
5	Tang Huei Pei (唐惠霈)	Democratic Progressive Party	431	1.62%	
6	Wu Cherng-dean	Kuomintang (New Party Endorsement)	9,838	37.04%	

=== Kinmen County Deputy Magistrate ===
==== 2016 Mainland China visit ====
In September 2016, Wu with another seven magistrates and mayors from Taiwan visited Beijing, which were Hsu Yao-chang (Magistrate of Miaoli County), Chiu Ching-chun (Magistrate of Hsinchu County), Liu Cheng-ying (Magistrate of Lienchiang County), Yeh Hui-ching (Deputy Mayor of New Taipei City), Chen Chin-hu (Deputy Magistrate of Taitung County), Fu Kun-chi (Magistrate of Hualien County) and Lin Ming-chen (Magistrate of Nantou County). Their visit was aimed to reset and restart cross-strait relations after President Tsai Ing-wen took office on 20 May 2016. The eight local leaders reiterated their support of One-China policy under the 1992 Consensus. They met with Taiwan Affairs Office Head Zhang Zhijun and chairman of the Chinese People's Political Consultative Conference (CPPCC) Yu Zhengsheng.

=== Chairman of the New Party ===
On 21 February 2020, he was elected as the chairman of the New Party.

==== 2023 Mainland China visit ====
On 6 June 2023, Wu visited Beijing, where he met CPPCC chairman Wang Huning. Chinese state-media quoted Wu as saying "only through reunification can Taiwan have a way out".

== Family ==
His cousin is actor-singer Wu Chun.

== See also ==
- United front in Taiwan

Party political offices
Preceded by Yok Mu-ming	Chairman of the New Party; 2020–present	Incumbent
