= Stephen Chung =

Taiwanese politician

Stephen Chung Chung Chin-kiang MLY
- 鍾金江

Member of the Legislative Yuan
- In office 2 June 2004 – 31 January 2005
- Preceded by: Parris Chang
- Constituency: Overseas Chinese
- In office 1 February 1999 – 31 January 2002
- Constituency: Overseas Chinese

Personal details
- Party: Democratic Progressive Party
- Education: Chinese Culture University
- Occupation: Politician

Stephen Chung (Chinese: 鍾金江; pinyin: Zhōng Jīnjiāng) is a Taiwanese politician who served on the Legislative Yuan from 1999 to 2002 and again from 2004 to 2005.

He earned a degree from Chinese Culture University before moving to the United States to study at Boston University.

In October 1999, Chung, Chen Ching-pao, and Lin Chung-mo visited the Lungmen Nuclear Power Plant. The inspection, undertaken shortly after the 1999 Jiji earthquake, found rusty reinforcing bars and potential for seawater seepage into the plant's foundation. He was supportive of a March 2000 agreement signed between the Aviation Safety Council and the Ministry of National Defense codifying inter-agency cooperation while investigating incidents involving military and civilian aircraft. In 2001, he spoke out against the placement of the Port of Kaohsiung under jurisdiction of Kaohsiung City Government via administrative decree from the Ministry of Transportation and Communications, stating that such a move should require legislative consent. Later that year, he stood by MOTC minister Yeh Chu-lan arguing that taxi drivers should not be exempted from paying a fuel tax, because the government would lose revenue designated for improvement of infrastructure.
