= HNU =

HNU may refer to:

== In China ==
- Harbin Normal University, in Heilongjiang, China
- Hangzhou Normal University, in Zhejiang, China
- Hefei Normal University, in Anhui, China
- Huanggang Normal University, in Hubei, China
- Hu'nan University, in Hu'nan, China
- Hainan University, in Haikou, Hainan, China

== In other countries ==
- Holy Name University, in Tagbilaran, Bohol, Philippines
- Holy Names University, in Oakland, California, United States

== Other uses ==
- Phong language, spoken in Vietnam and Laos
