= Jinsha, Kinmen =

Coordinates: 24.481109°N 118.427993°E

Jinsha Township 金沙鎮 Kinsha, Chinsha
- Urban township
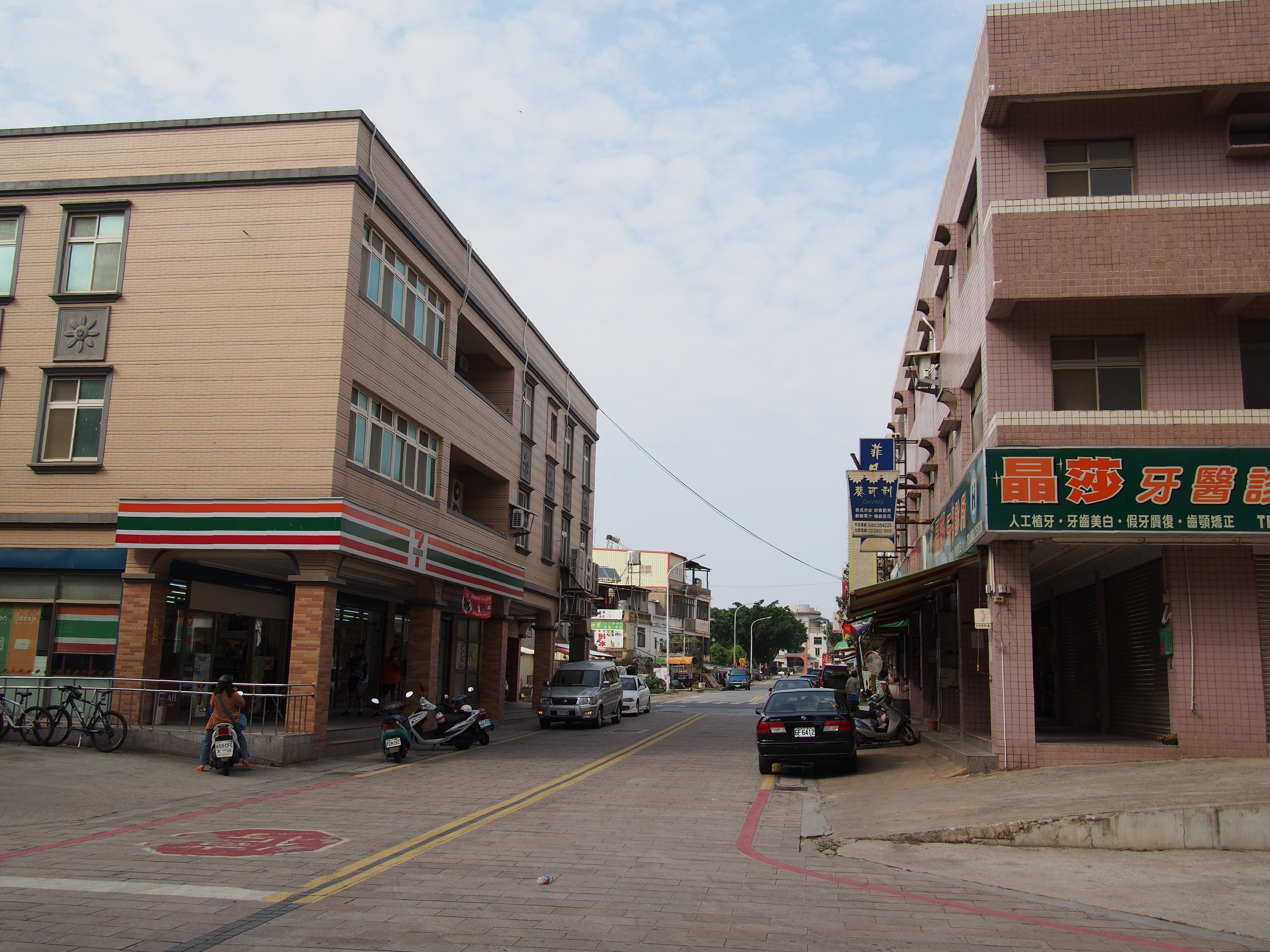

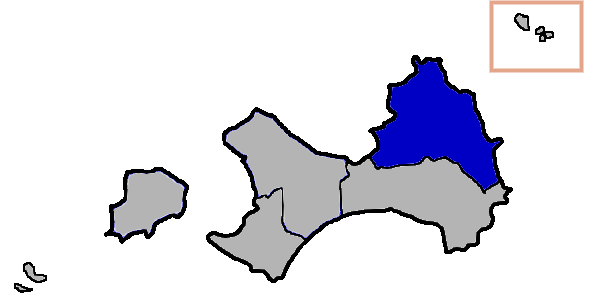
- Jinsha Township (blue) in Kinmen County (grey)
- Country: Republic of China (Taiwan)
- Province: Fuchien
- County: Kinmen
- Urban villages: 8

Government
  - Mayor: Wu Yu-Chia (吳有家)

Area
  - Total: 41.2920 km^{2} (15.9429 sq mi)

Population (February 2023)
  - Total: 20,689
  - Density: 501.04/km^{2} (1,297.7/sq mi)
- Time zone: UTC+8 (National Standard Time)
- Postal code: 890
- Website: kinsha.kinmen.gov.tw/en

Jinsha Township (Kinsha) (Chinese: 金沙鎮; pinyin: Jīnshā Zhèn; Pe̍h-ōe-jī: Kim-soa-tìn; lit. 'gold dust') is an urban township in the north-eastern corner of Greater Kinmen Island, Kinmen County, Fuchien, Taiwan. It is in the Taiwan Strait, on the coast of mainland China.

== Geography ==
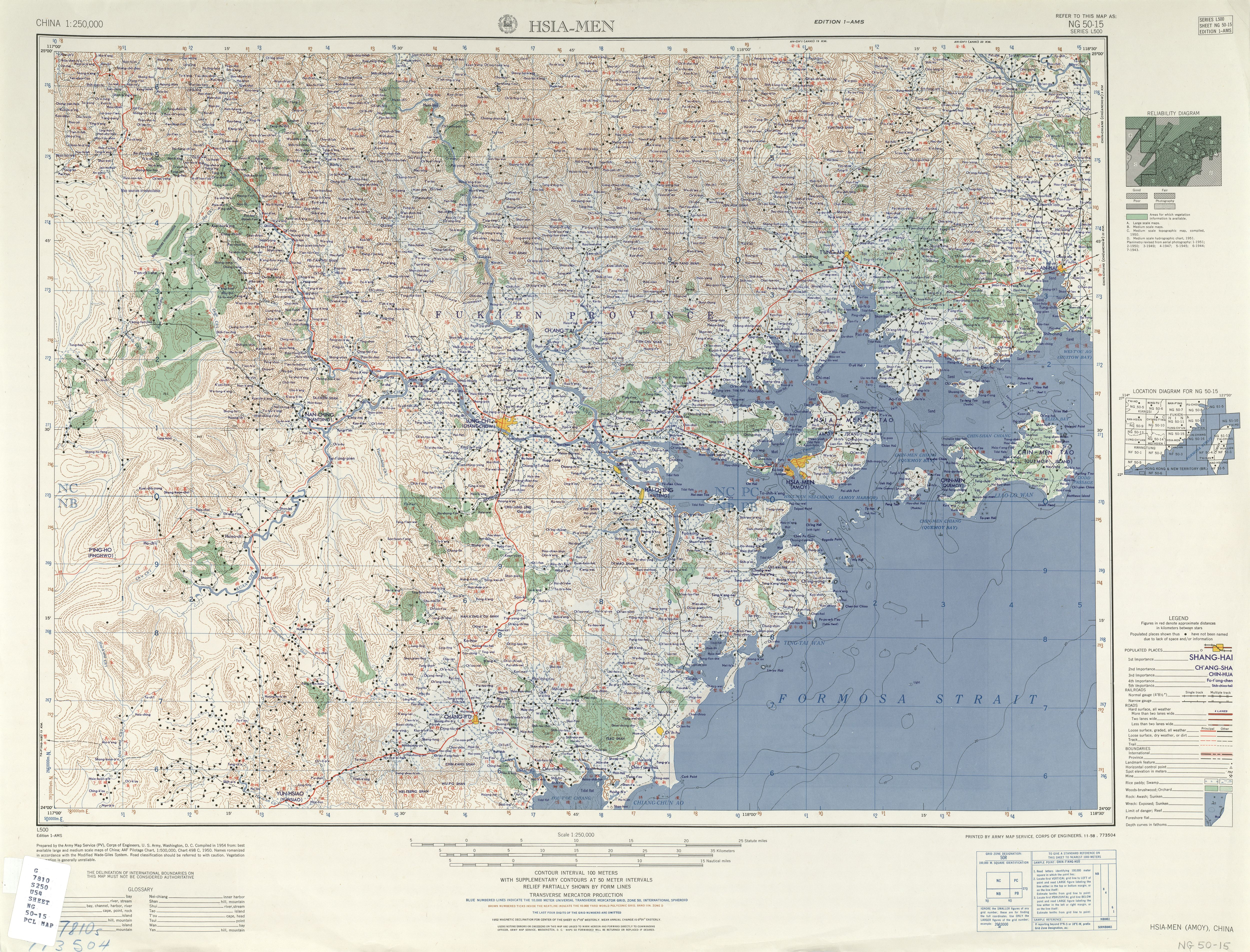
Map including the Jinsha Township area (1954)

Jinsha has a population of 20,689 (February 2023) and an area of 41.2920 km^{2} (15.9429 sq mi). The township is the second largest by area of the six townships of Kinmen County. The township includes Cao Islet (草嶼), Hou Islet (后嶼), and other small islets.

At low tide, the coast near Mashan (馬山) in northern Jinsha is 1.8 kilometres (1.1 mi) from Jiaoyu (角嶼), an island originally part of Kinmen County in Dadeng Subdistrict, Xiamen. Rock-filled waters make passage between the two areas difficult.

== Politics and government ==
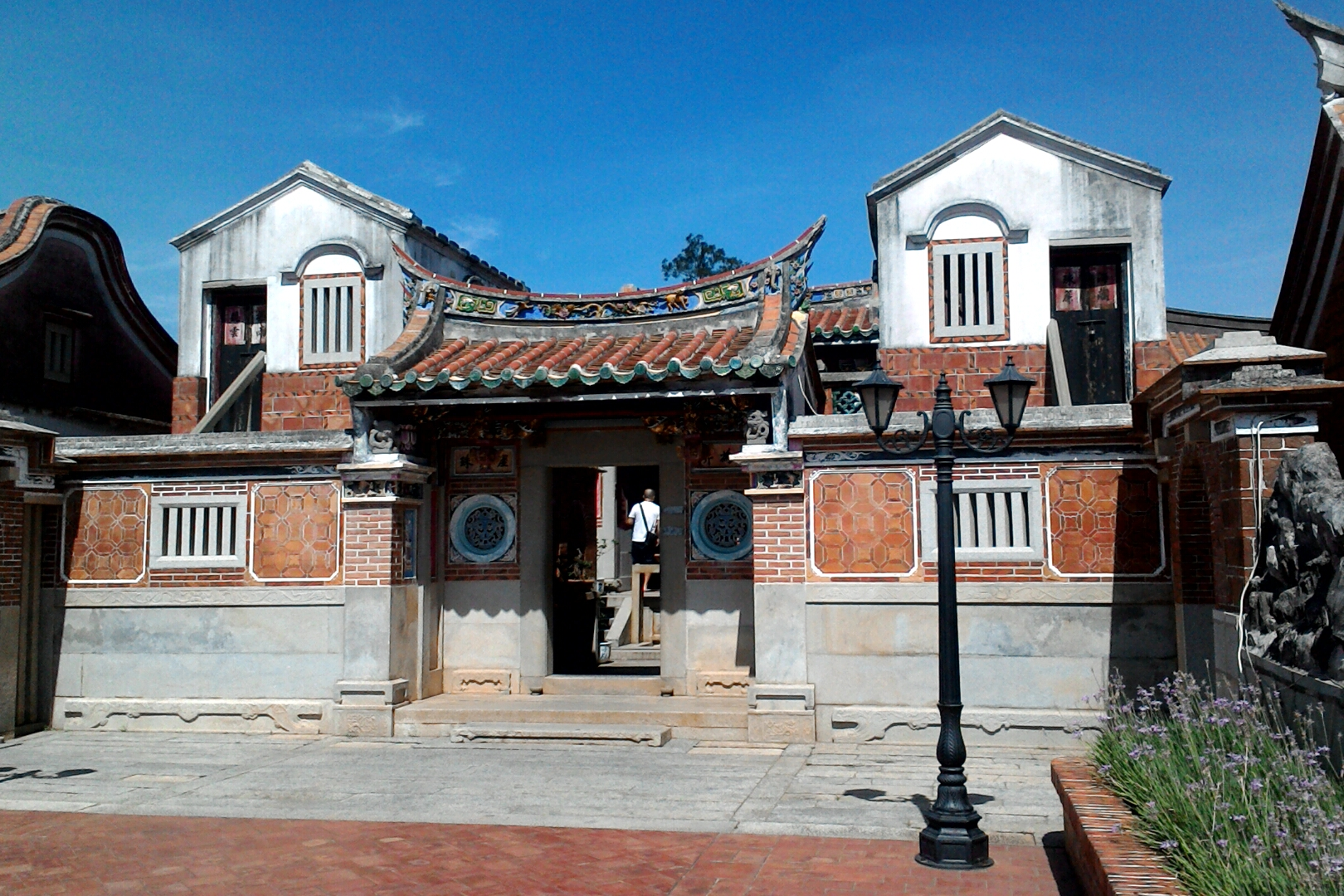
Sanshan Village architecture

=== Administrative divisions ===
Jinsha Township is divided into eight urban villages:

- Dayang Village (大洋里)
- Hodo / Hedou Village (何斗里)
- Kuanchien / Guangqian Village (光前里)
- Guanyu Village (官嶼里), northernmost village; includes Cao Islet (Ts'ao Hsü; 草嶼), Hou Islet (后嶼), and other small islets
- Pushan Village (浦山里)
- Sanshan Village (三山里)
- Wensha Village (汶沙里)
- Siyuan / Xiyuan Village (Hsi-yüan; 西園里)

=== Mayors ===
After World War II, mayors of the Jinsha Township were:

- Mayors (鎮長) (urban township)
1. Chang Hsi-Hu (張西湖) (1945)
2. Huang Ko-Tsun (黃國存) (1946)
3. Lin Yen-Chueh (林延爵) (1946–1947)
4. Chang Jung-Chiang (張榮強) (1947–1949)
- Mayors (鄉長) (rural township)
1. Chang Jung-Chiang (張榮強) (1949)
2. Chang Hsi-Hu (張西湖) (1949)
- Mayors (區長) (districts)
  - District 1: Chang Jung-Chiang (張榮強) (1949–1950)
  - District 2: Wang Tien-Chu (王天祝) (1949), Chang Hsi-Hu (張西湖) (1949–1950)
  - Unified district: Chang Jung-Chiang (張榮強) (1950–1953)

Since 1953, the Jinsha Township has been led by a mayor (鎮長) (urban township).

1. Chang Jung-Chiang (張榮強) (1953–1954)
2. Wu Shui-Chih (吳水池) (1954–1955)
3. Teng Chen-Kang (鄧振剛) (1955–1958), also mayor of Jinhu, Kinmen
4. Hsieh Shui-I (謝水義) (1958–1960)
5. Yeh Te-Hui (葉德輝) (1960–1963)
6. Chang Ying (張英) (1963–1965)
7. Chang Li-Min (張立民) (1965–1966)
8. Fu Wen-Min (符文敏) (1967–1971)
9. Huang Sheng-Chien (黃聖堅) (1971–1975)
10. Chang Chun-Chuan (張春傳) (1975–1986)
11. Chen Chia-Chieh (陳佳結) (1986–1994)
12. Huang Ching-Lan (黃清壈) (1994–2002)
13. Huang I-Hsin (黃奕焮) (2002–2006)
14. Chen Kun-Ti (陳昆第) (2006–2014)
15. Chen Chi-Te (陳其德) (2014–2016)
16. Wang Teng-Wei (王登緯) (2016)
17. Chen Chi-Te (陳其德) (2016)
18. Wang Teng-Wei (王登緯) (2016–2017)
19. Yang Chih-Pin (楊志斌) (2017)
20. Tsai Chi-Chao (蔡其朝) (2017–2018)
21. Wu Yu-Chia (吳有家) (2018–present)

== Education ==
- Kinmen Campus of Ming Chuan University

== Infrastructure ==
- Shanxi Reservoir
- Tianpu Reservoir

== Tourist attractions ==
- Jindong Movie Theater
- Longfeng Temple
- Kinmen Folk Culture Village
- Mashan Broadcasting and Observation Station
- Wang Chin-cheng's Western House

== See also ==
- List of islands of Taiwan
