= Lee Chu-feng =

Taiwanese politician (born 1953)

- 李炷烽
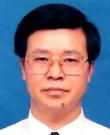

Magistrate of Kinmen County
- In office 20 December 2001 – 20 December 2009
- Preceded by: Chen Shui-tsai
- Succeeded by: Li Wo-shi

Member of the Legislative Yuan
- In office 1 February 1999 – 20 December 2001
- Succeeded by: Chung Hsin-tsai
- Constituency: Republic of China (New Party party list)

Personal details
- Born: 6 May 1953 (age 72) Kinmen, Fujian
- Party: New Party
- Education: National Taiwan Normal University (BEd)

Lee Chu-feng (Chinese: 李炷烽; pinyin: Li Zhùfēng; born 6 May 1953) is a Taiwanese politician. He was the Magistrate of Kinmen County from 2001 to 2009.

== Teaching career ==
Lee graduated from National Taiwan Normal University and became a teacher and principal in Jincheng and Jinsha.

== Legislative career ==
Lee won election to the National Assembly in 1996, then the Legislative Yuan in 1998, via the New Party list. His election as Kinmen County magistrate necessitated his resignation from the Legislative Yuan, where he was succeeded by Chung Hsin-tsai.

== Kinmen County Magistracy ==
=== Kinmen County Magistracy elections ===
Lee was elected as the Magistrate of Kinmen County after winning the 2001 magisterial election as a New Party candidate and took office on 20 December 2001. He was reelected for a second term in the 2005 magisterial election and served through 20 December 2009.

=== 2008 visit to mainland China ===
In June 2008, Lee visited Beijing to attend the fund raising telethon by China Central Television for the victims relief of the 2008 Sichuan earthquake which occurred a month before in Sichuan. Lee first sailed from Kinmen to Xiamen in Fujian through the Three Links followed by a flight to Beijing. He took the opportunity of this visit to better understand issues concerning the conversion between New Taiwan dollar and Renminbi and the water supply to Kinmen from mainland China.
