= Tianpu Reservoir =

Reservoir in Jinsha, Kinmen, Taiwan

- 田埔水库 (Chinese)
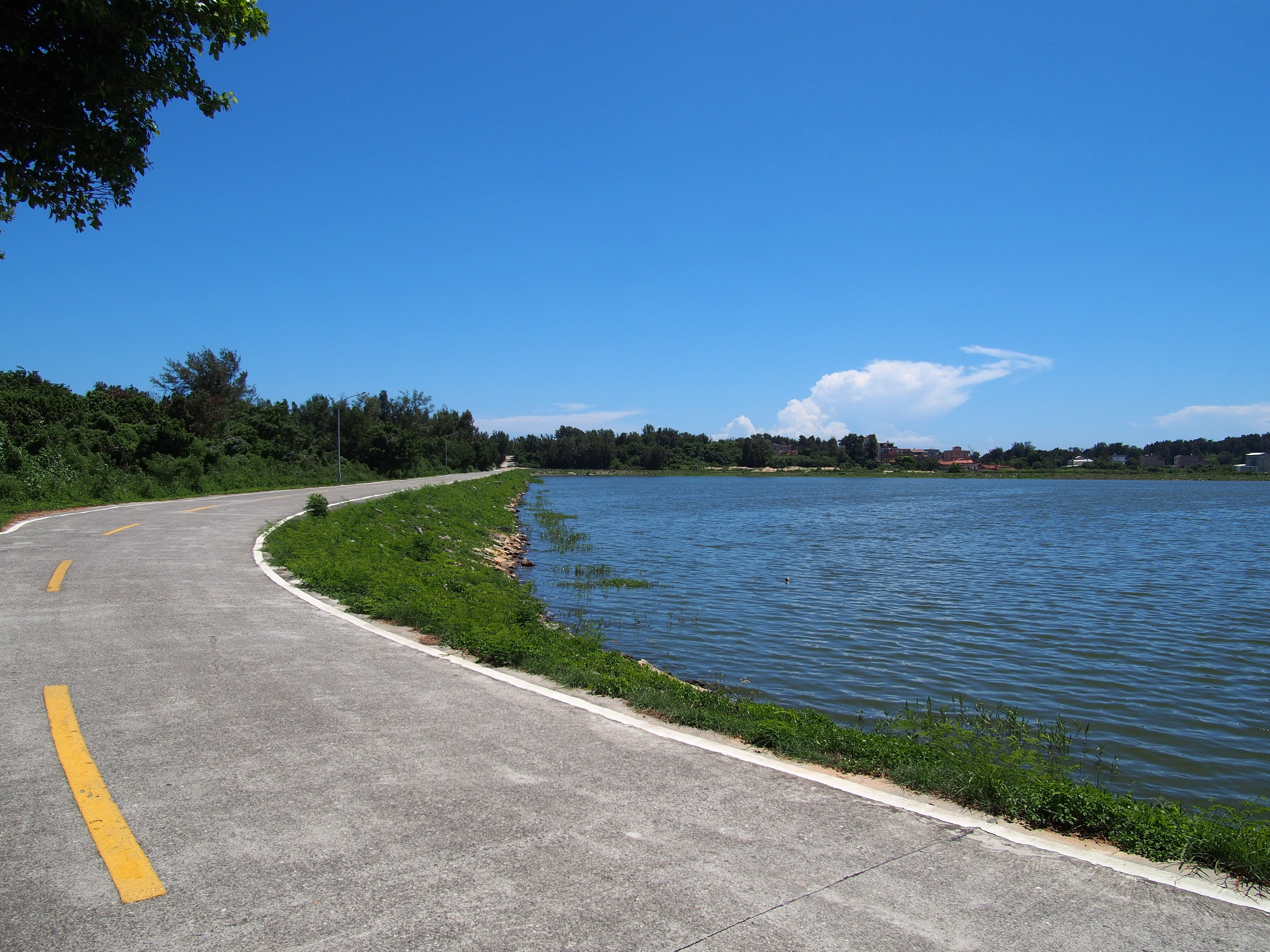

- Location of Tianpu Reservoir (red)
- Location: Jinsha, Kinmen, Taiwan.
- Coordinates: 24°28′36.1″N 118°27′22.9″E
- Type: reservoir
- Primary inflows: Longhu Lake
- River sources: Qianpu River
- Water volume: 599,000 cubic metres (21,200,000 cu ft)

The Tianpu Reservoir (traditional Chinese: 田埔水庫; simplified Chinese: 田埔水库; pinyin: Tiánbù Shuǐkù) is a reservoir in Jinsha Township, Kinmen County, Taiwan. It is the catchment area of water supplied from China through the Jinjiang–Kinmen Pipeline.

== Geology ==
The reservoir has an effective capacity of 599,000 m^{3} (21,200,000 cu ft). The main local source for the reservoir comes from Qianpu River in Kinmen and supply from Mainland China originated from Longhu Lake in Fujian.

== See also ==
- Jinjiang–Kinmen Pipeline
