= Jindong Movie Theater =

Theater in Jinsha, Kinmen, Fuchien, Republic of China

- 金東電影院
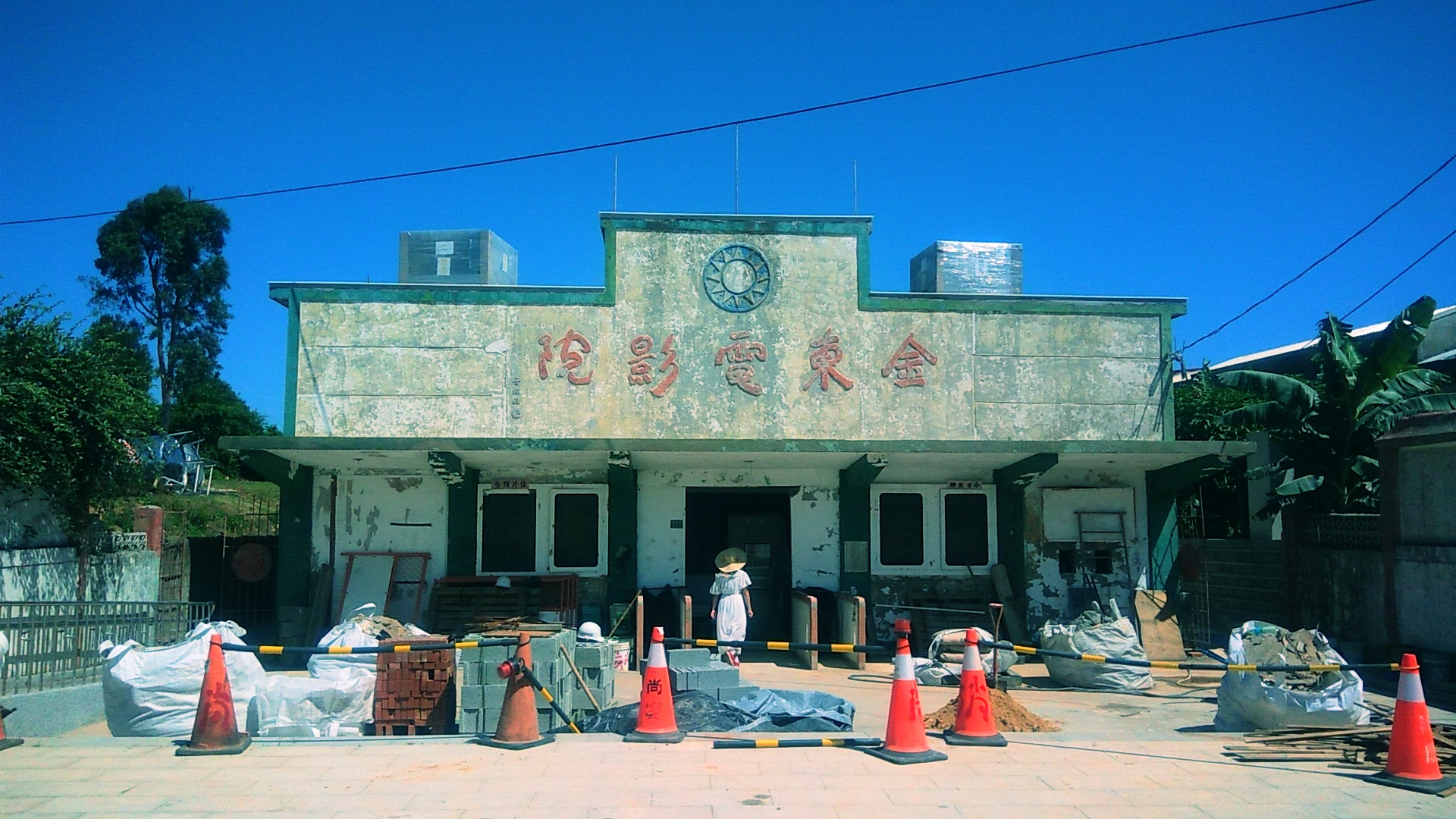
- Interactive map of Jindong Movie Theater
- Location: Jinsha, Kinmen, Fuchien, Republic of China
- Coordinates: 24°28′43.4″N 118°25′38.3″E
- Type: movie theater

Construction
- Built: 1960

The Jindong Movie Theater (traditional Chinese: 金東電影院; simplified Chinese: 金东电影院; pinyin: Jīndōng Diànyǐngyuàn) is a movie theater in Jinsha Township, Kinmen County, Fuchien, Republic of China.

== History ==
The theater was built in 1960, funded by donations from Taipei City Council speaker Chang Hsiang-chuan to award the officers and soldiers in the county. The theater became popular with local people in which it turned the surrounding area into a bustling economic activities. Around the year 2000, the theater was closed but was reopened again in 2020.

== Architecture ==
The theater building was constructed with bricks and cements. It also displays a white writing What are We Fighting for on its red wall.

== See also ==
- Cinema of Taiwan
