= Chung Hsin-tsai =

Taiwanese politician

Chung Hsin-tsai (Chinese: 鍾新財; 1955–2007) is a Taiwanese politician.

In April 2001, Chung was indicted on charges of corruption as part of an investigation into waste dumping and incineration practices that had taken place in Meinong, Kaohsiung during his tenure as leader. Later that year, he was appointed to the Legislative Yuan, taking office on 28 December 2001 to replace Lee Chu-feng, who had been elected to the Kinmen County magistracy.
