= Shanxi Reservoir =

Dam in Jinsha, Kinmen, Taiwan

- Interactive map of Shanxi Reservoir
- Location: Jinsha, Kinmen County
- Coordinates: 24°30′22″N 118°25′43″E
- Purpose: public water supply
- Construction began: March 1996

Shanxi Reservoir (traditional Chinese: 山西水庫; simplified Chinese: 山西水库; pinyin: Shānxī Shuǐkù), also known as Shansi Reservoir, is a reservoir located in Shanxi Village, Jinsha Township, Kinmen County, Taiwan. Its water source is natural rainfall.

The construction of the Shanxi Reservoir started in March 1996 and was completed in September 1997. It has a catchment area of 0.88 square kilometers and a designed effective water storage capacity of about 220,000 cubic meters.
