= Kinmen Folk Culture Village =

Cultural center in Jinsha, Kinmen, Taiwan

- 金門民俗文化村
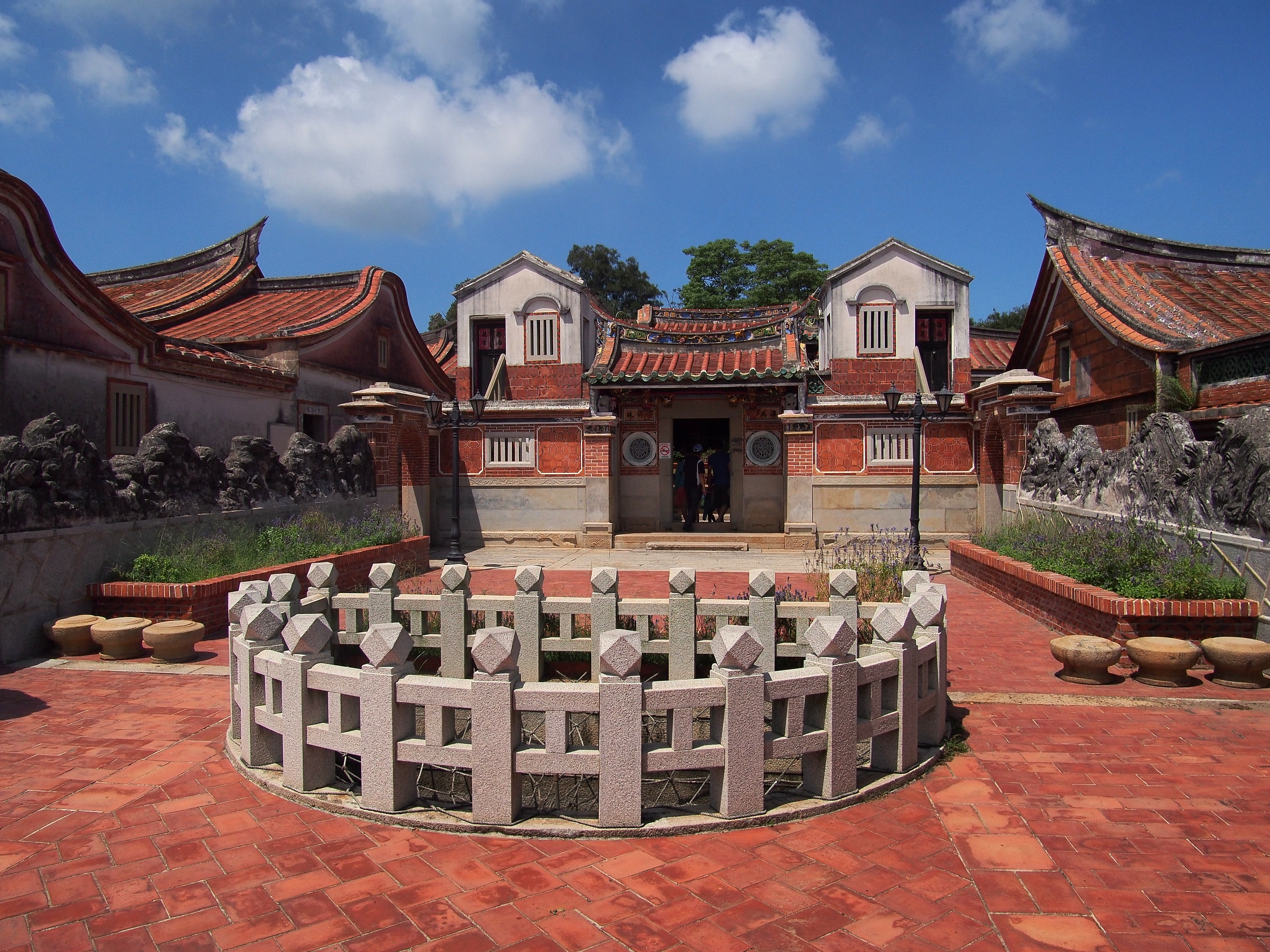
- Interactive map of the Kinmen Folk Culture Village area
- Alternative names: Shanhou Folk Culture Village

General information
- Type: cultural center
- Architectural style: Fujian
- Location: Jinsha, Kinmen, Taiwan
- Coordinates: 24°30′12.3″N 118°26′27.8″E
- Construction started: 1876
- Completed: 1900

Design and construction
- Developer: Wang Kuo-chen

The Kinmen Folk Culture Village (traditional Chinese: 金門民俗文化村; simplified Chinese: 金门民俗文化村; pinyin: Jīnmén Mínsú Wénhuà Cūn) is a cultural center in Jinsha Township, Kinmen County, Taiwan.

== History ==
The culture village was designed by an architect from Jiangxi and built by Wang Kuo-chen, a successful businessman who created his wealth while he was in Japan. The construction started in 1876 and it took 25 years to complete all buildings in this area in the year 1900. During the martial law period, the village was renovated to become a folk culture village and later in 1995 was included into the Kinmen National Park. It was the first village in Kinmen which was turned into a tourist destination.

== Architecture ==
The culture village has the most complete range Hokkien architecture on the island, consisting of 18 house buildings, including 16 symmetrical two-courtyard historic houses, an ancestral shrine and a village private school (村塾) named Haizhutang (海珠堂). All of the buildings were built on the hillside of Mount Wuhu (五虎山) facing the sea in three orderly rows on a solid granite rock bed. It consists of three settlements, Shangbao (上堡), Zhongbao (中堡) and Xiabao (下堡). Shanghao and Zhongbao belonged to the Wang clan while the Xiabao settlement belonged to the Liang clan.

== See also ==
- Kinmen
