= Kinmen County Government =

Government of Kinmen County, Taiwan

- 金門縣政府; Jīnmén Xiàn Zhèngfǔ
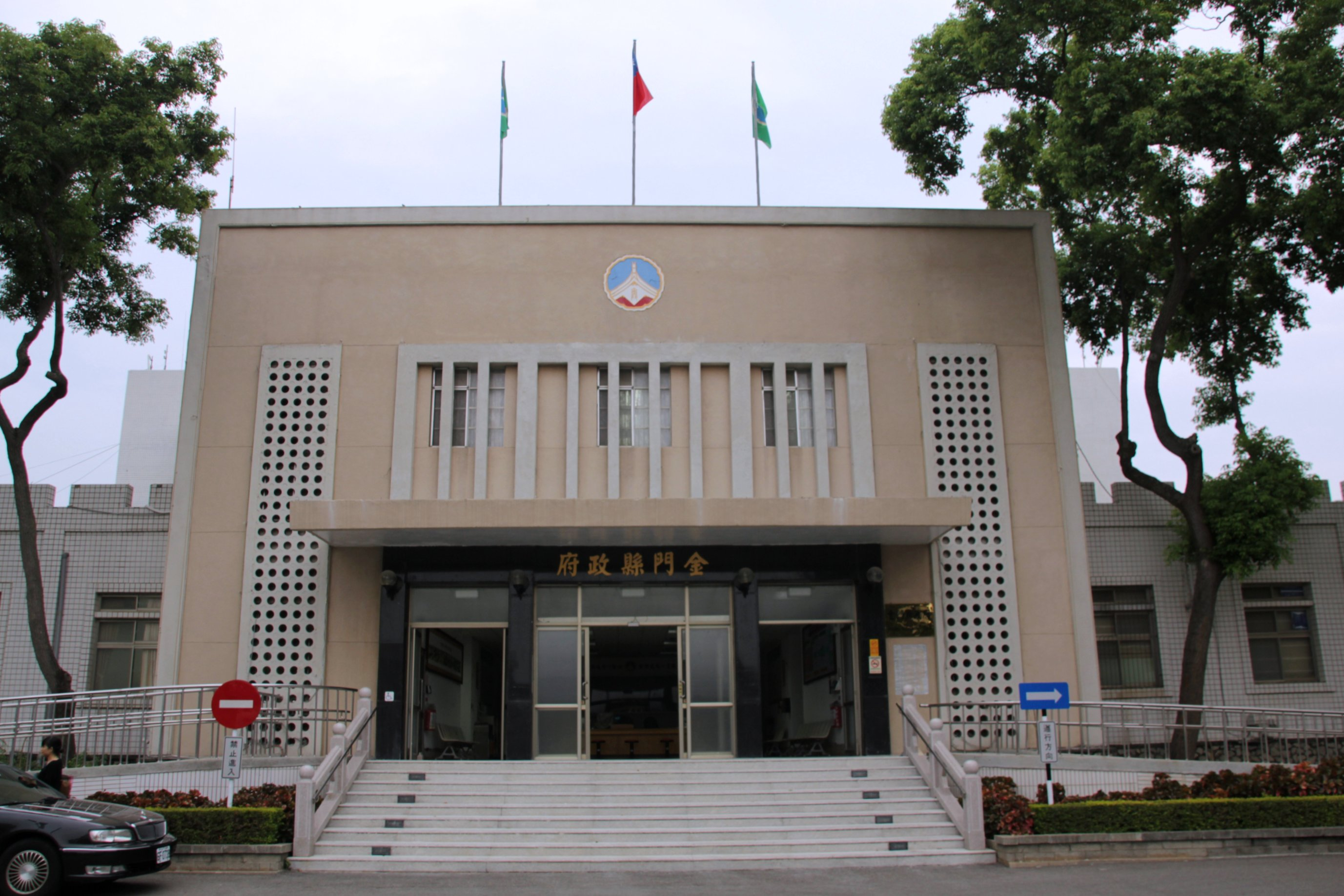
- Kinmen County Hall

Agency overview
- Jurisdiction: Kinmen County
- Headquarters: Jincheng Township; 24.4368°N 118.3186°E
- Agency executive: Chen Fu-hai, Magistrate
- Parent agency: Government of the Republic of China
- Website: Official website

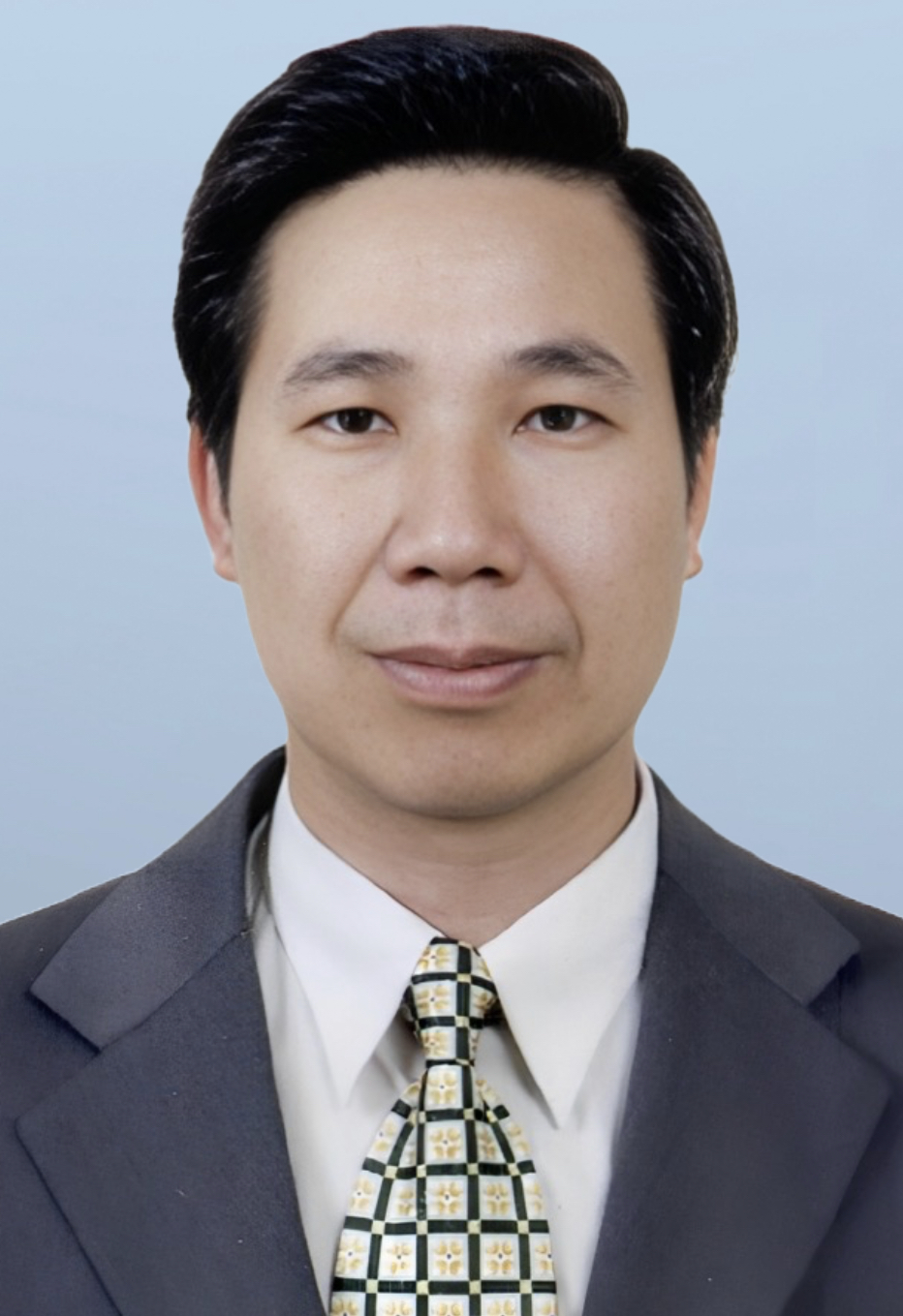
Chen Fu-hai, the incumbent Magistrate of Kinmen County

The Kinmen County Government (traditional Chinese: 金門縣政府; simplified Chinese: 金门县政府; pinyin: Jīnmén Xiàn Zhèngfǔ) is the local government of the Republic of China that governs Kinmen County.

== Organizational structures ==
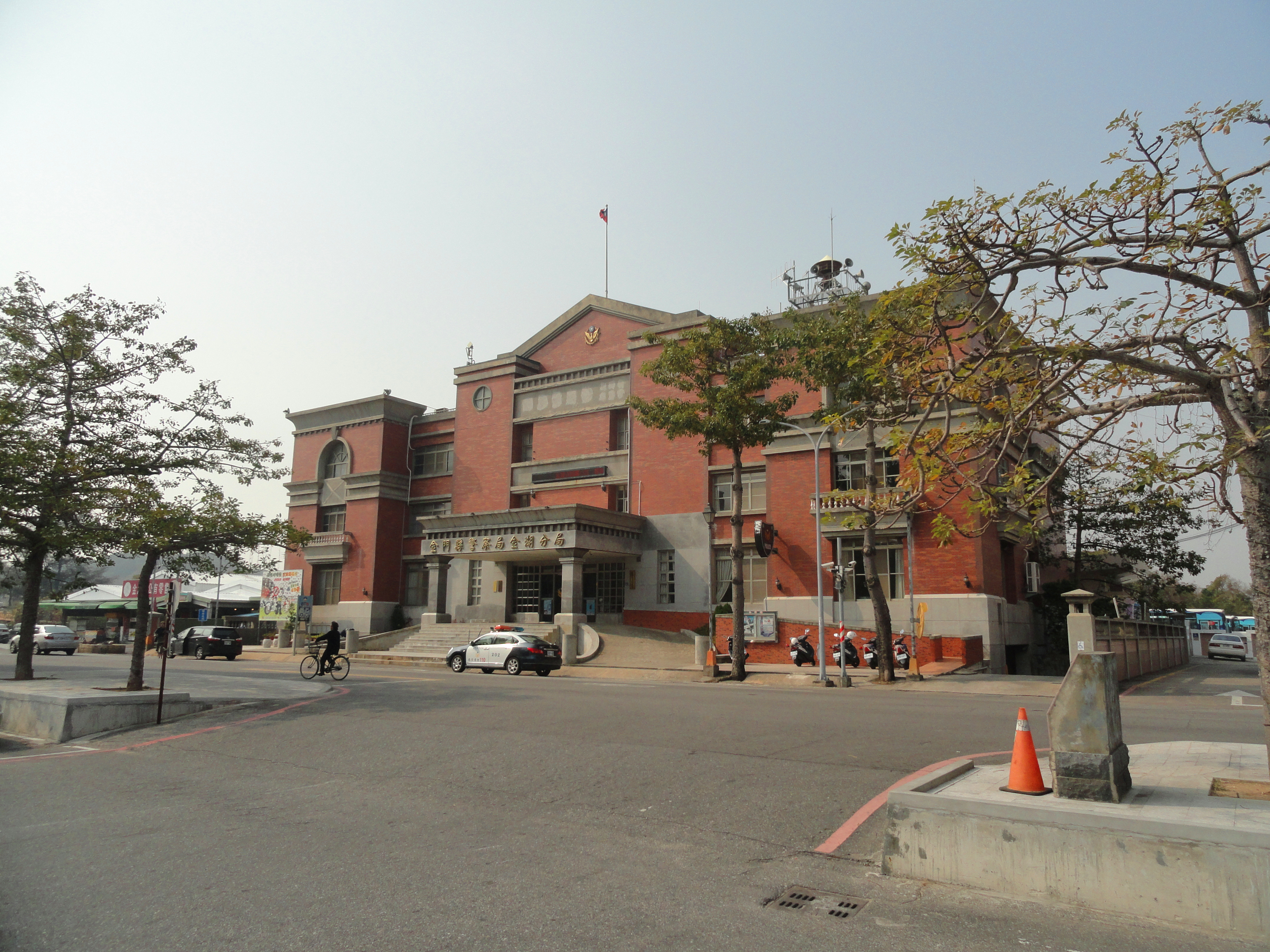
Police Bureau Jinhu Branch

=== Bureau ===
- Civil Affairs Bureau
- Finance Bureau
- Education Bureau
- Economic Development Bureau
- Public Works Bureau
- Social Affairs Bureau
- Transportation and Tourism Bureau

=== Office ===
- Research and Evaluation Office
- General Affairs Office
- Accounting and Statistics Office
- Civil Service Ethics Office
- Personnel Office

=== First Level Agency ===
- Police Bureau
- Health Bureau
- Land Administration Bureau
- Environmental Protection Bureau
- Fire Bureau
- Cultural Affairs Bureau
- Revenue Service Office

== See also ==
- Kinmen County Council
