= Journal of International Cooperation =

- Discipline: Multidisciplinary
- Language: English
- Edited by: Pai-Po Lee

Publication details
- History: 2006–present
- Publisher: Taiwan International Cooperation Alliance (Taiwan)
- Frequency: biannual
- Open access: Yes, free registration

Standard abbreviations
- ISO 4: J. Int. Coop.

Indexing
- ISSN: 1992-1497 (print); 1992-1497 (web)
- OCLC no.: 858451958

Links
- Journal homepage; Online archive; Online free registraation

The Journal of International Cooperation (JIC), is an open access peer-reviewed scientific journal published biannually by the Taiwan International Cooperation Alliance (TICA), and sponsored by the International Cooperation and Development Fund (Taiwan ICDF).

== Scope ==
The journal is focused on research areas with relevance on international cooperation such as agriculture and fishery, business and management, engineering and science, public health and medicine.

== History ==
The journal started in 2006, and since then have continuously published two issue every year. In 2011, Ming Chuan University and Taiwan ICDF started an annual International Student Paper Competition in which finalist papers are submitted to the JIC journal.

== Affiliations ==
Published by the Taiwan International Cooperation Alliance (TICA), which integrates eighteen leading Taiwanese universities holding English-taught international programs including National Taiwan University, National Central University, National Chung-Hsing University, National Tsing-Hua University, and others, the JIC is based in the Department of Tropical Agriculture and International Cooperation of the National Pingtung University of Science and Technology, Taiwan.
