= Lee Wo-shih =

Taiwanese political scientist

- 李沃士
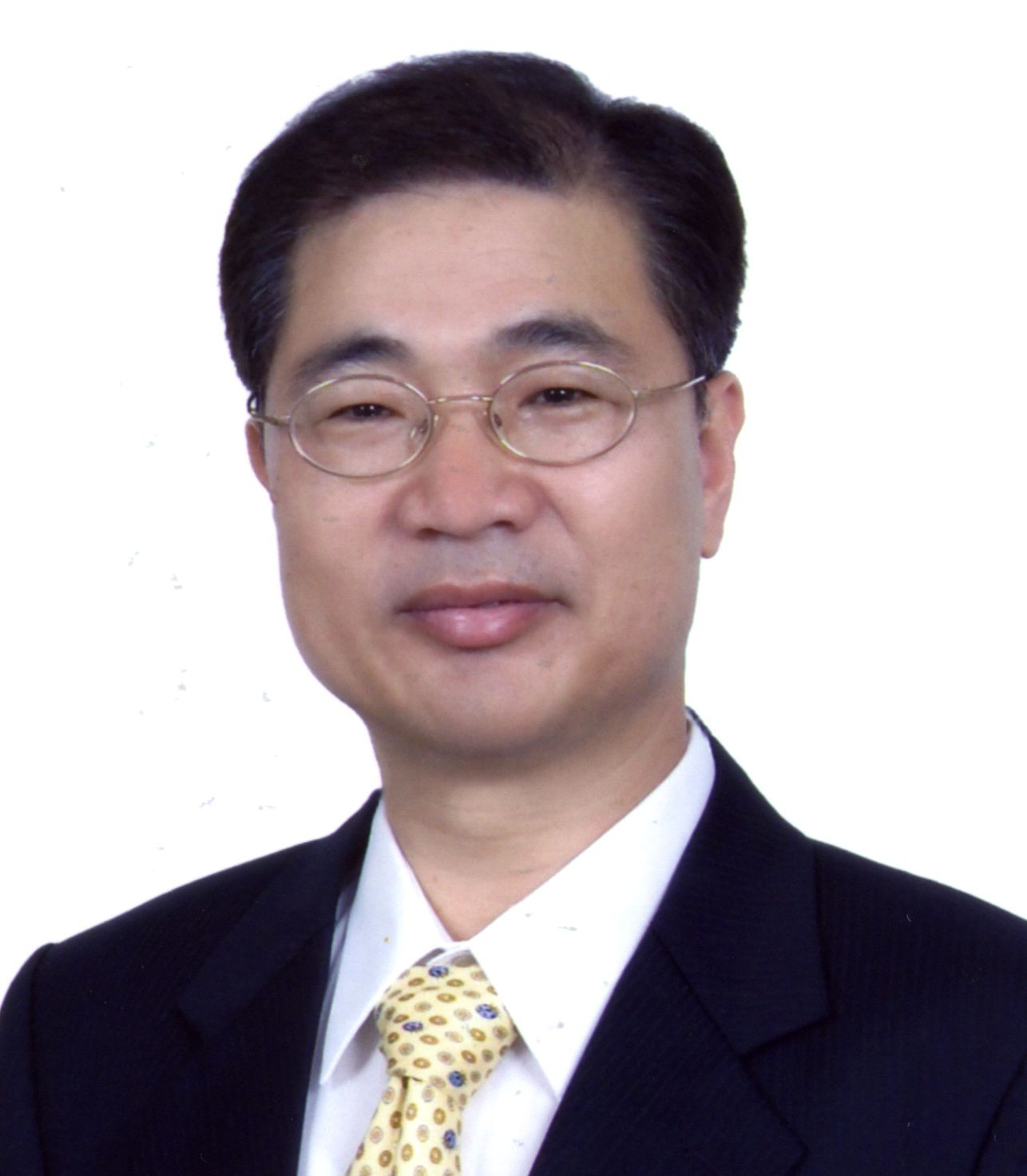
- Lee in 2009

Magistrate of Kinmen County
- In office 20 December 2009 – 25 December 2014
- Deputy: Wu You-qin
- Preceded by: Lee Chu-feng
- Succeeded by: Chen Fu-hai

Personal details
- Born: 1 April 1960 (age 66) Kinmen, Fujian
- Party: Kuomintang
- Education: Xiamen University (PhD); Ming Chuan University (MS); National Cheng Kung University (BS)

Lee Wo-shih (Chinese: 李沃士; pinyin: Li Wòshì; born 1 April 1960) is a Taiwanese political scientist and politician. He was the Magistrate of Kinmen County from 20 December 2009 until 25 December 2014.

== Education ==
Lee graduated from National Cheng Kung University with a bachelor's degree in naval architecture and earned a master's degree in political science from Ming Chuan University. He then earned his Ph.D. in political science and international relations from Xiamen University.

== Political career ==
On 12 January 2008, he joined the 2008 Republic of China legislative election as an independent candidate from Kinmen constituency. However, he lost the election.

No.	Candidate	Party	Votes	Ratio	Result
1	Chen Fu-hai	Independent	9,912	37.31%	
2	Lee Wo-shih	Independent	5,274	19.85%	
3	Gao Sian Teng (高絃騰)	Civil Party	39	0.15%	
4	Hu Wei Sheng (胡偉生)	Independent	1,070	4.03%	
5	Tang Huei Pei (唐惠霈)	Democratic Progressive Party	431	1.62%	
6	Wu Cherng-dean	Kuomintang (New Party Endorsement)	9,838	37.04%	

== Kinmen County Magistrate ==
=== 2009 Kinmen County Magistrate election ===
Lee was elected as the Magistrate of Kinmen County after winning the 2009 Republic of China local election under the Kuomintang on 5 December 2009 and took office on 20 December 2009.

=== Cross-strait marriages ===
On 10 October 2010, Li presided over a group of cross-strait marriages featuring several couples between Taiwanese and mainland Chinese people. The marriage was done to celebrate the national day of the Republic of China. The wedding ceremony featured traditional rites, such as parade floats and the couple sitting in palanquins and on horses.

=== Duty-free island Kinmen ===
In mid June 2013 speaking at an economic forum organized by Taiwan Competitiveness Forum and attended by people from Taiwan, Hong Kong and mainland China, Li proposed Kinmen to be developed as duty-free island to boost tourism and the local economy. Kinmen can attract some of the 41.24 million tourists visiting the nearby Xiamen city last year to the island. Li had also asked the central ROC government to grant mainland Chinese tourists multiple-entry visas for Kinmen, and also asked Beijing to ease the current Kinmen one-day tour restrictions to two or three days.

=== Deminers memorial park opening ceremony ===
Speaking during the opening ceremony of a memorial park to commemorate the mine-laying activities in end of March 2014, Li said that Kinmen is no longer a place with full of buried mines, but it is a tourist spot featuring beautiful coastlines and historical relics from wartime.

=== Water supply from mainland China ===
Speaking during the official visit of Fujian Communist Party Chief You Quan to Kinmen in mid-July 2014, Li asked You for a drop in price of the water supply from mainland China to Kinmen, in which it will connect Longhu Reservoir in Xiamen to Tienpu Reservoir in Kinmen. The current water price set by mainland China is CNY 2 per 1,000 liters.

=== 2014 Kinmen County Magistrate election ===
Lee lost to independent Chen Fu-hai in the 2014 Kinmen County magistrate election held on 29 November 2014.

2014 Kinmen County Magistrate Election Result
No.	Candidate	Party	Votes	Percentage
1	Su Long-ke (蘇龍科)	Independent	470	1.03%
2	Lei You-jing (雷由靖)	Independent	132	0.29%
3	Chen Fu-hai	Independent	23,965	52.77%
4	Lee Wo-shih	Kuomintang	15,146	33.35%
5	Wang Cheng-hua (汪成華)	The Guarantee of Educational, Scientific and Cultural Budget e-Union	403	0.89%
6	Hong Zhi-heng (洪志恒)	Independent	636	1.40%
7	Zhuang Yu-min (莊育民)	Independent	236	0.52%
8	Lin Suei-Chuan (林水泉)	Independent	240	0.53%
9	Shiu Nai-chiuan (許乃權)	Independent	3,834	8.44%
10	Yang Rong-xiang (楊榮祥)	Independent	354	0.78%

== Legal judgments ==
In 2017, the Kinmen branch of the Fuchien High Court found that Lee had violated the Anti-Corruption Act. An appellate ruling by the same court in 2021 reversed the decision. Following an appeal to the Supreme Court, the Kinmen Fuchien High Court ruled in 2024 that Lee was guilty, and sentenced him to 90 months imprisonment.
