= Ming Chuan University =

Private university in Taiwan

Coordinates: 25.0882°N 121.5279°E

- 銘傳大學
- Motto: 誠樸敬毅
- Motto in English: Honesty, Modesty, Respect, Fortitude
- Type: Private
- Established: 1957; 69 years ago
- Affiliations: U12 Consortium
- President: Hsuan-Shih Lee (李選士)
- Undergraduates: 17,628 (2018)
- Postgraduates: 1,414
- Location: Taiwan, United States
- Campus: Taipei, Taoyuan, Kinmen, Michigan, U.S.
- Website: http://www.mcu.edu.tw/

Chinese name
- Traditional Chinese: 銘傳大學
Transcriptions
Standard Mandarin
- Hanyu Pinyin: Míngchuán Dàxué
Southern Min
- Hokkien POJ: Bêng-thoân Tāi-ha̍k

Ming Chuan University (MCU; Chinese: 銘傳大學; pinyin: Míngchuán Dàxué) is a private university in Taiwan. It has three domestic campuses—in Taipei, Taoyuan and Kinmen—and an international campus in Michigan, U.S. The university also has education centers in Japan, Korea, Vietnam, and Thailand.

MCU is a member of the Excellent Long-Established University Consortium of Taiwan (ELECT). The consortium includes 13 universities, such as Fu Jen Catholic University, Soochow University, Chung Yuan Christian University, Taipei Medical University, among others.

MCU is the first university in Asia to receive accreditation from the United States of America by the MSCHE (Middle States Commission on Higher Education), and it is also the only university in Taiwan with such accreditation. The university has also obtained accreditation from CHEA (Council for Higher Education Accreditation) and AACSB.

== History ==
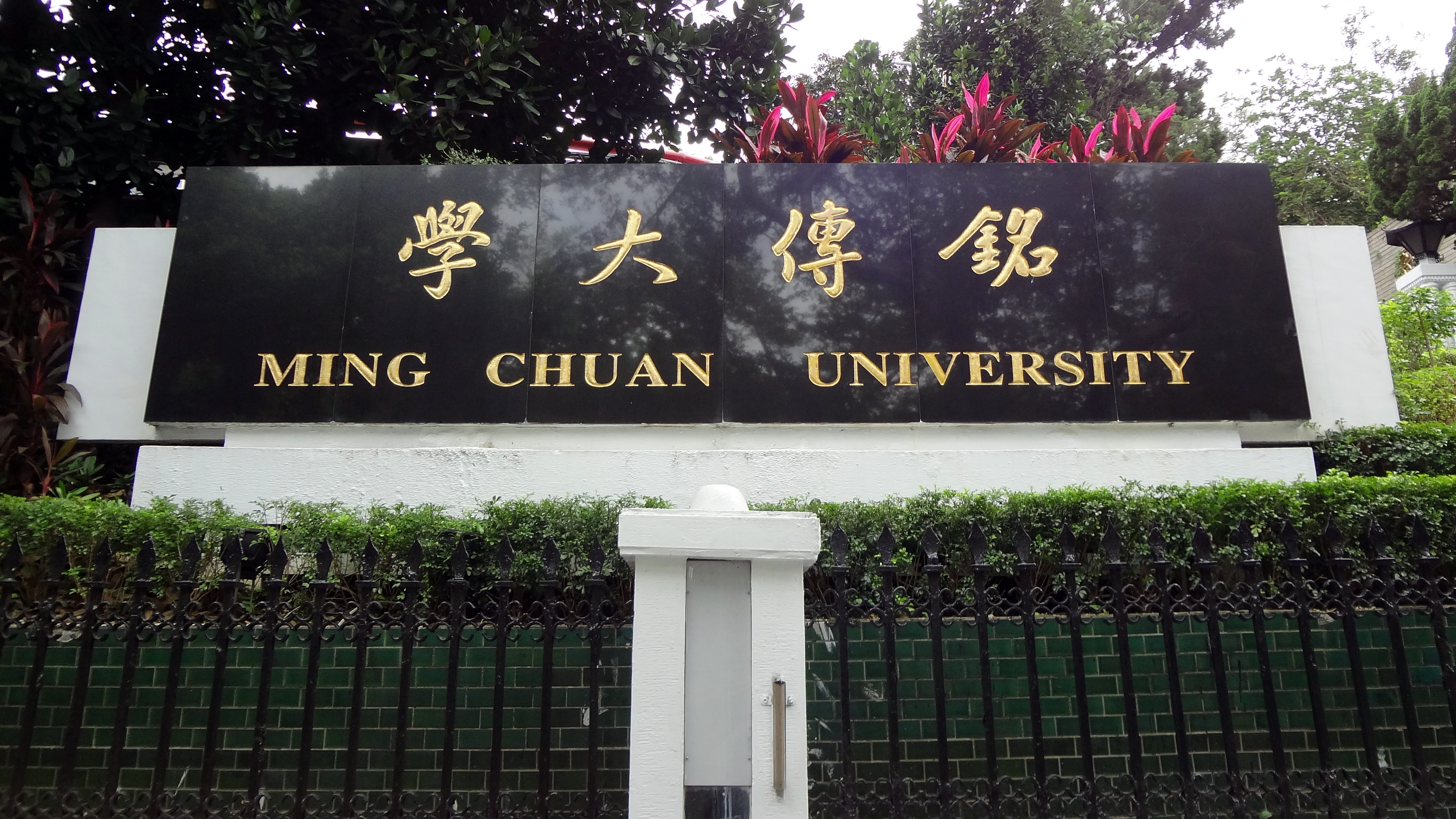
Ming Chuan University

Ming Chuan University was founded in 1957 by Dr. Teh-Ming Pao and Dr. Ying-Chao Lee. It was Taiwan's first women's business school (women's college). Dr. Teh-Ming Pao, its first president, had the most significant influence on its development. When the government had just moved to Taiwan and the economy was lagging, with an urgent need to nurture business professionals, Dr. Pao founded the school in the interests of national development, at the same time raising awareness of the talents and rights of women and facilitating their contributions to society. She began preparations in Fall 1956 and on March 25, 1957, the Ministry of Education approved its founding. It began operation the following Fall.

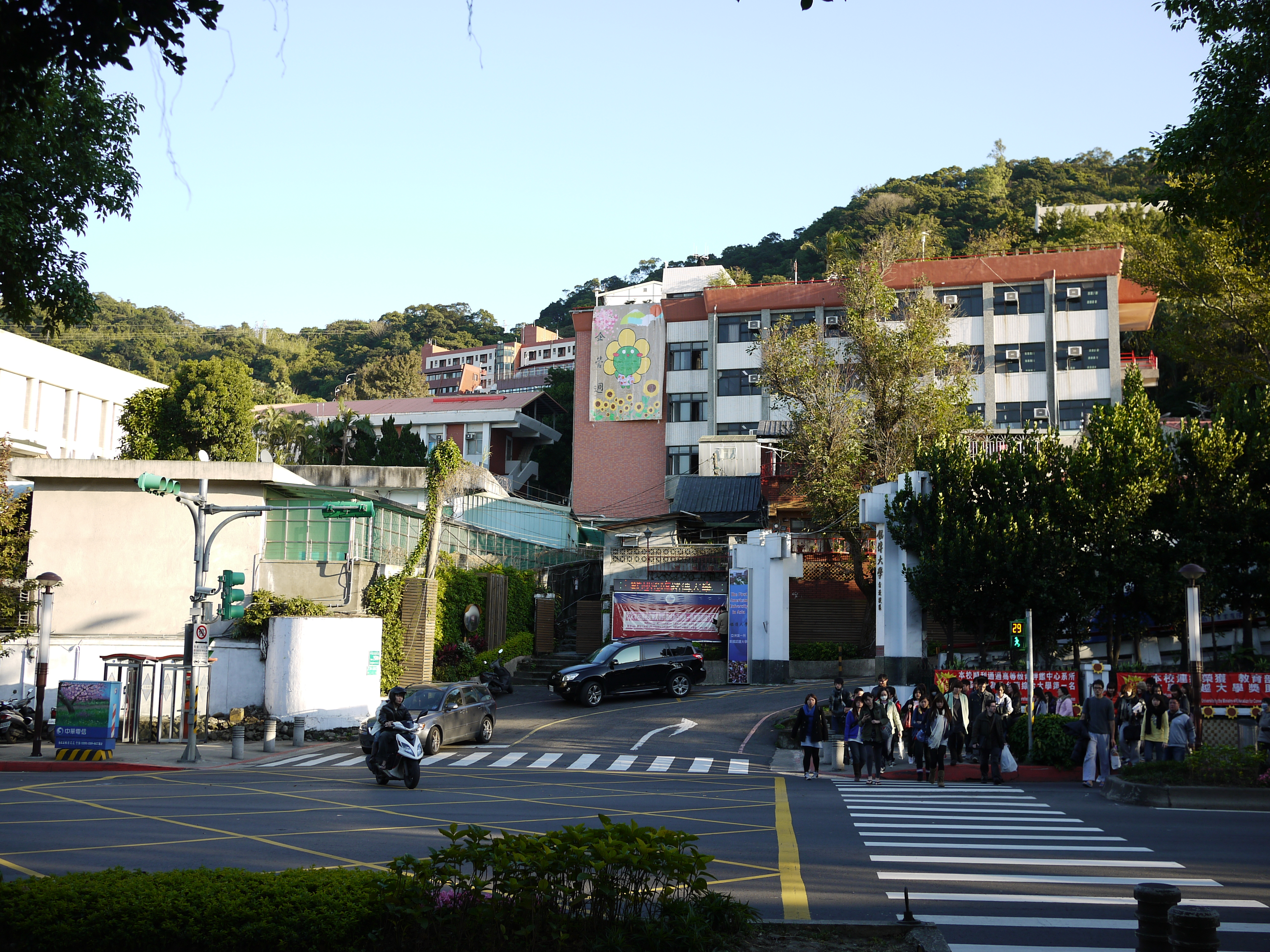
Taipei Campus

The original plan called for Ming Chuan to be located in Danshui. However, a descendant of Liu Ming-Chuan, Madam Liu, was having difficulty maintaining Ming Chuan Orphanage that she had established on Zhong-Shan North Road. She found Dr. Pao willing to take over Ming Chuan Orphanage, which was later converted into the school of the same name. In five years following its establishment the school was twice moved and rebuilt, finally being relocated to its present site in the Shihlin District in 1962. Dr. Pao borrowed funds so that construction could be completed all at once.

Since MCU began as a commercial college, the original three-year day school consisted of three programs: Banking and Insurance, Accounting and Statistics, and International Trade and Business Administration. In 1960, Secretarial Science was added and Ming Chuan became part of the national junior college joint entrance examination program. The former four departments were formed into an evening program added in 1963. In 1964, the day school added a Commercial Mathematics department and Secretarial Science was added to the evening program. A five-year program for junior high school graduates was established in the same year and grew to an enrollment of 1400. The Ministry of Education of the ROC promoted Ming Chuan to senior college status on July 16, 1990.

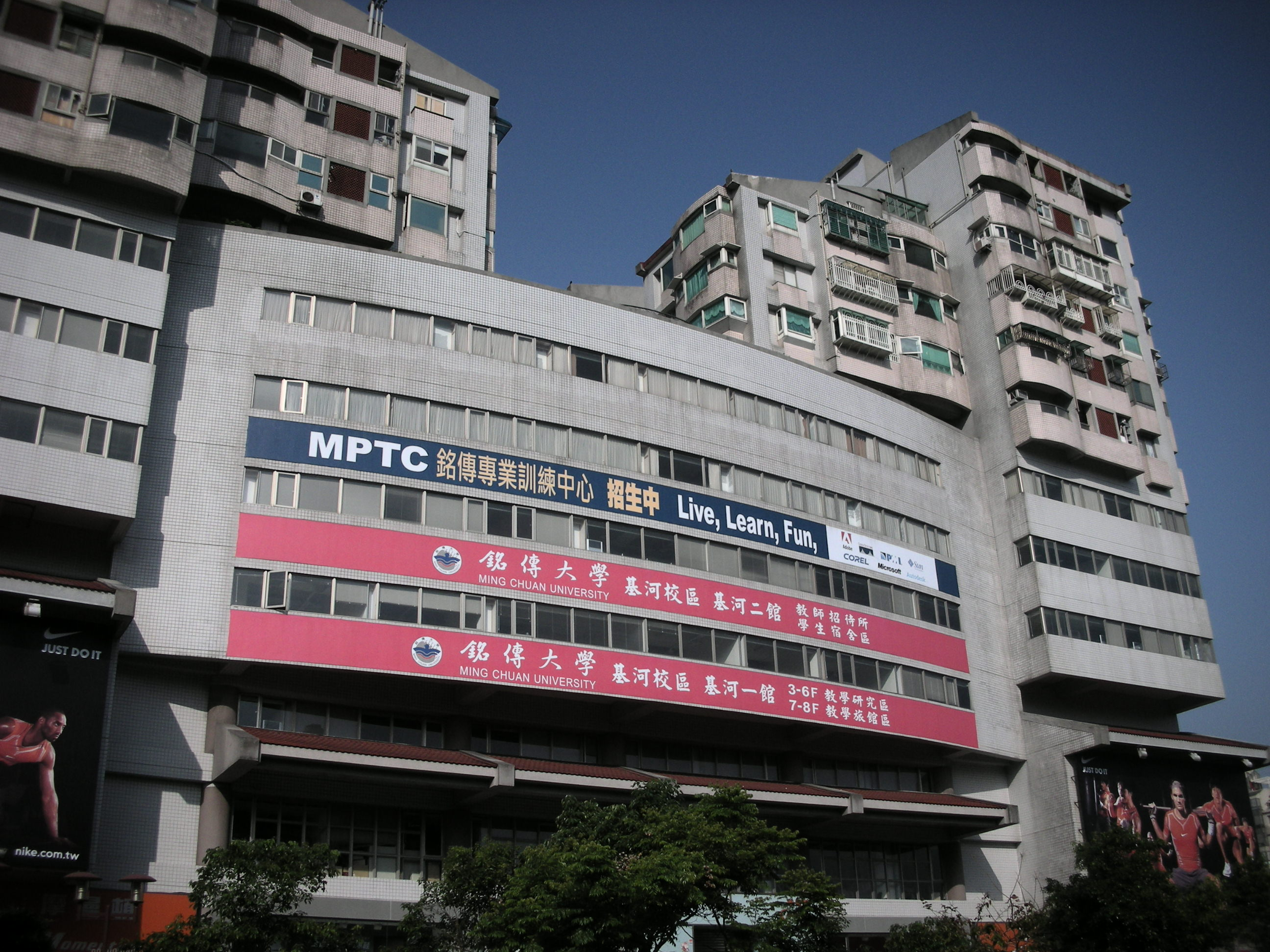
Jihe Campus

After more than 30 years of development, Ming Chuan's campus on Mount Fu was full to capacity. In 1967, the school purchased gently sloping ground in Guishan Township (now Guishan District) of Taoyuan County (now Taoyuan City). In 1995, at the invitation of the Kinmen County Education Advancement Investigation Team, Ming Chuan established a campus in Kinmen, thus becoming a comprehensive university with three campuses. Success at Kinmen led the Ministry of Education to approve MCU's establishment of Matsu Executive Master's Programs to promote higher education in Kinmen and Matsu and further Pao's dream “to serve the island residents”, recognizing the right of all to an education.

In 2011, the university began holding an annual International Student Paper Competition sponsored by Taiwan ICDF, and finalist papers are published in the Journal of International Cooperation.

With the introduction of ICDF (International Corporation and Development Fund) scholarships, the university has become known for its large international population. Ming Chuan opened its Michigan Campus at Saginaw Valley State University in 2014.

Entrusted by the government, MCU is responsible for managing the Taiwan Scholarship and Huayu Enrichment Scholarship Program. In addition, MCU is responsible for hosting Taiwan's international youth exchange program.

MCU signed the Taiwan Huayu BEST Program partnership with Rice University and University of Oklahoma.

== Campus life and traditions ==
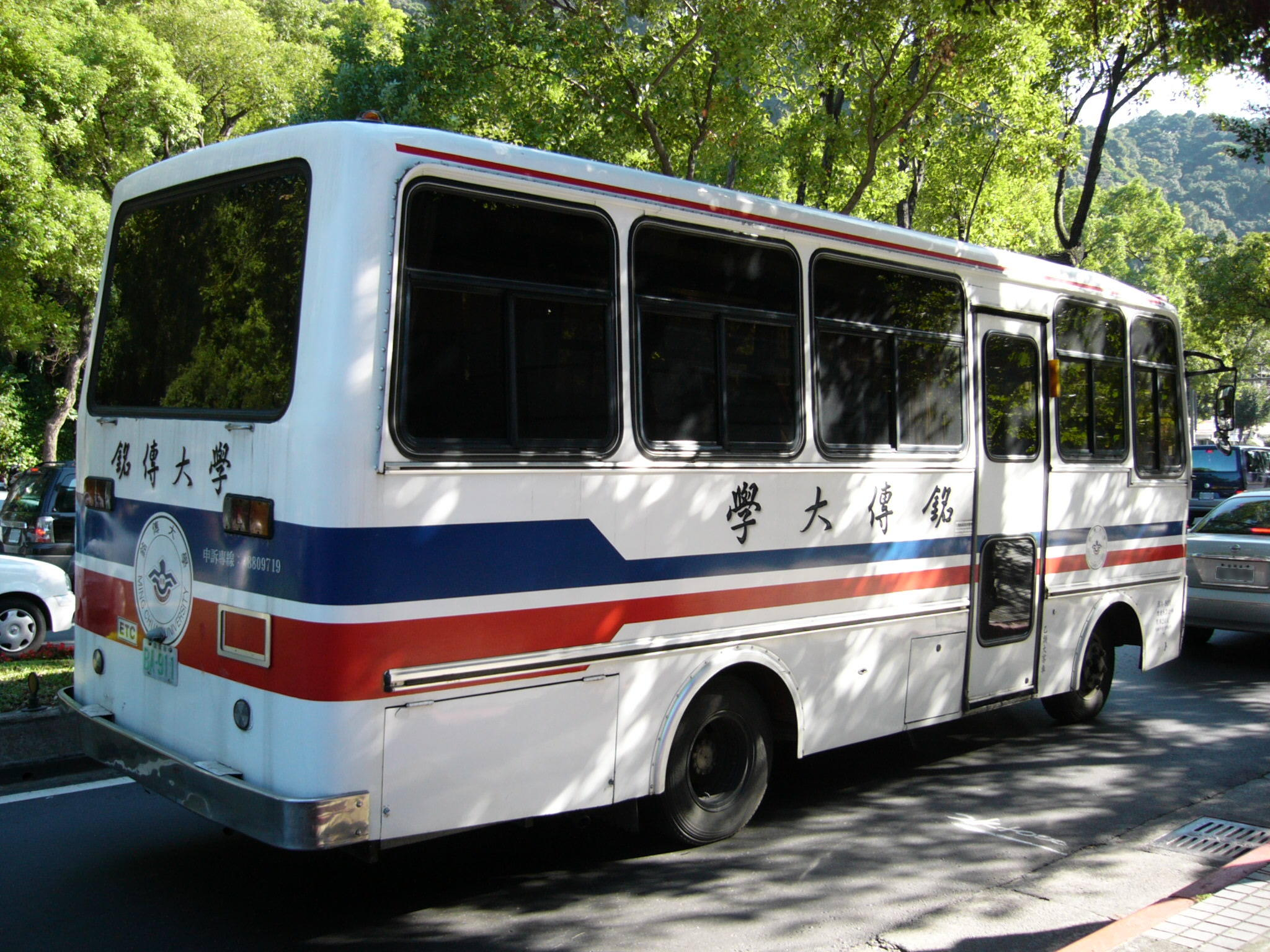
School Service Vehicle

Mascot

The university's mascot is a whale.

Emblem and flag

The university flag, like the flag of Taiwan, is red, white, and blue. The emblem follows the color of the flag, with an ascending eagle and three curved figures from the bottom to the top.

Plum-blossom examination seating arrangement

First introduced during the women's business school period, this system is characterized by uniform examination schedules throughout the entire school. Exam information is uniformly released by the school and seat assignments are randomized. Each pair of adjacent students takes different subjects in the examination. Any student caught cheating during the exam is subject to expulsion according to regulations.

All pass Candies

This activity is one of the traditions at MCU. Seniors traditionally give a small gift to their juniors before exams, wishing them success in their midterms and finals.

Ming Chuan University F.C.

It was established by Ming Chuan University and serves as the football club for the Taiwan University Football Association, Taiwan Football Premier League, and Taiwan Second Division Football League. The club has achieved both championship and runner-up titles. The club plays their home matches on the Taoyuan campus of MCU.

In 1979, Dr. Teh-Ming Pao established the MCU women's football team. It was a core known as the "Mulan" in the ROC women's national football team at that time. The team having won three championships in the AFC Women's Asian Cup during the 1970s. Influenced by this, the unofficial women's football world championship was held in Taiwan in 1981, and it is regarded as a motivating factor for the establishment of the Germany women's national football team.

== Academic program overview ==
- Management
- Tourism
- Law
- Education & Applied Languages
- Communication
- Information Technology
- Design
- Social Science
- Health & Medical Engineering
- International College
- Financial Technology

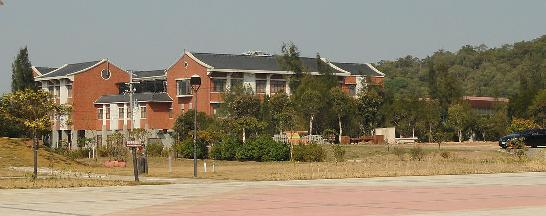
Kinmen Campus

MCU collaborates with Saginaw Valley State University, and they have a branch campus located in the state of Michigan.

MCU collaborates with overseas universities such as the University of the Thai Chamber of Commerce and SANNO University. They have established international education centers in Japan, Korea, Thailand, Vietnam, and other locations. The university also collaborates with some Chinese universities to establish colleges locally, including the establishment of the Ocean College in collaboration with Fuzhou University, the Liu Mingchuan College in collaboration with Hefei Normal University, and the Straits School of Business and Trade in collaboration with Xiamen University of Technology.

International College at MCU is the first institution in Taiwan offering degrees through classes conducted completely in English.

== Ranking and reputation ==
Ming Chuan University rankings

Global – Overall
- RUR World: 956 (2024)
- THE World: 1501+ (2024)

Regional – Overall
- QS Asia: 701–750 (2025)
- THE Asia: 601+ (2024)

National – Overall
- THE National: 35–45 (2024)

- MSCHE CHEA

MCU is the first university in Asia to receive accreditation from the United States (MSCHE), and it is also the only university in Taiwan with such accreditation. The university has also obtained accreditation from CHEA.

- Academic Ranking of World Universities (ARWU):

Global Ranking of Academic Subjects - Hospitality & Tourism Management

2019: 51-75; 2020: 37; 2021: 44; 2022: 51-75 (1st in Taiwan）

- Round University Ranking (RUR):

World University Ranking: 956

Subject Rankings - Humanities: 785

- QS World University Rankings:

Asia：701-750

Eastern Asia: 325

- Global Views Monthly Taiwan's Best University Rankings:

Universities focusing on humanities and social sciences: 7th

private university: 14th

Internationality: 5th

== Notable alumni ==
- Margaret Huang (黃麗燕), CEO of Leo Burnett Group Taiwan
- Ding Ling-juan (丁菱娟), founder and CEO of Era Ogilvy Public Relations
- Wang Wen-jing, CEO of Business Weekly Media Group
- Xue Ya-ping, CEO of Silks Hotel Group (Regent Hotel Group)
- Sandra Yu (余湘), chairman of the board of Growww Media Group
- Yao Yuan-zhong, Senior Vice President for the Asia-Pacific at Eurex, chief representative for Greater China Region of Deutsche Börse
- Anne Shih, chairman of the board of Bowers Museum
- Zhao Wei, News presenter (China Television, TVBS)
- Xiong Lv-yang, News presenter (China Television)
- Chen Yung-kang, News presenter (TVBS, Next TV)
- Lee Ya-Yuan, News presenter (Broadcasting Corporation of China)
- Chang Ya-fang, News presenter (Eastern Broadcasting Company, Sanlih E-Television, China Television)
- Natalie Han, News presenter (Eastern Broadcasting Company, Videoland Sports Channel)
- Namewee (黃明志), Rapper, singer-songwriter, record producer, filmmaker, actor (1983-)
- Sam Wang, Taiwan actor, member of two groups 5566 and 183 Club
- Cao Jing-hao, member of group Nan Quan Mama
- Aggie Hsieh (謝沛恩), entertainer
- Bryan Chang, Taiwan actor
- Megan Lai, Taiwan actress and singer
- Cheng Hsiao-tse (程孝澤), director of the movie 「渺渺」 (Miao Miao)
- Tina Pan, Taiwanese politician
- Andy Chiu, Taiwanese politician
- Mary Chen, Taiwanese politician
- Chao Cheng-yu, Taiwanese politician
- Chen, Yi-Chieh, Taiwanese politician
- Lee Wo-shih, Magistrate of Kinmen County (2009-2014)

== See also ==
- List of universities in Taiwan
- U12 Consortium
