= Chen Ching-pao =

Taiwanese politician (born 1955)

- 陳清寶

Member of the Legislative Yuan
- In office 1 February 1993 – 31 January 2002
- Preceded by: Huang Wu-jen
- Constituency: Kinmen County
- Succeeded by: Wu Cherng-dean

Personal details
- Born: 9 December 1955 (age 70) Kinmen, Fujian Province, Republic of China
- Party: Independent
- Other political affiliations: Kuomintang
- Education: National Taiwan Ocean University

Chen Ching-pao Chinese: 陳清寶; born 9 December 1955) is a Taiwanese politician.

== Early life and career ==
Chen was born in 1955, and attended National Taiwan Ocean University. Prior to pursuing political office, he was a schoolteacher at a vocational high school.

== Electoral history ==
Chen was elected to the Legislative Yuan from the Kinmen County Constituency for the first time in 1992, while affiliated with the Kuomintang. Chen succeeded Huang Wu-jen in office. Chen won reelection twice, in 1995 and 1998. In April 2001, the Taiwan Association of University Professors regarded Chen as one of thirteen worst-performing legislators. Chen subsequently lost his bid for a fourth legislative term in December, and yielded the Kinmen seat to Wu Cherng-dean. Before leaving office in 2002, Chen expressed being at peace with his electoral loss, and later stated, "As a microcosm of society, the legislature has its share of hypocrites. I'm glad I'll be leaving this place soon." Chen was unsuccessful in a 2004 independent legislative campaign. During his final legislature term, Chen also served on the Kuomintang's Central Committee.

== Legislative career ==
In 1999, Chen cautioned against withdrawing the Republic of China Armed Forces from Kinmen. As the Democratic Progressive Party-affiliated Chen Shui-bian presidential administration assumed office in 2000, Chen Ching-pao questioned the selection of Kuomintang member Tang Fei as premier. Throughout the year, Chen opposed budgets proposed by the Democratic Progressive Party-affiliated administration. In 2001, Chen criticized presidential advisers Shi Wen-long and Birei Kin. Later that year, he questioned security efforts undertaken by Taiwanese airlines shortly after the September 11 attacks.

=== Three links ===
Throughout his legislative tenure, Chen Ching-pao advocated for the little three links between China and Taiwan, including plans to develop Kinmen into a "duty-free trade center" as described by Chen Ching-hwang, director of Chen Ching-pao's legislative office in Kinmen. After amendments to the Offshore Islands Development Bill passed a third legislative reading in March 2000, Chen Ching-pao described the action as "a goodwill gesture from Taiwan." He subsequently called for expansion of the links, namely travel for religious purposes. Chen also suggested several infrastructure improvements regarding the little three links. He proposed that a bridge between Kinmen and Xiamen be built, and also advocated for facilities in the Liaolo port on Kinmen to be expanded. Chen opposed a December 2000 proposal by Lin Chia-sheng, minister of the Research, Development and Evaluation Commission, to directly legalize gambling on Kimen and Matsu Islands as part of the little three links. In October 2001, Chen proposed revisions to The Offshore Islands Development Act which permitted residents to decide by referendum whether or not to legalize gambling. In January 2001, Chen Ching-pao opined that the Chen Shui-bian government was not adequately promoting the little three links.

In November 2000, before the little three links were formally established, Chen Ching-pao and other legislators attempted to sail from Kinmen to Xiamen, but were forced to turn back due to large waves. Chen began planning a second voyage the next month. Chen observed several days before departure that the government of China was unresponsive. Chen's direct contact with the Xiamen municipal government was more successful. However, the trip was eventually cancelled.

== Controversy ==
In 2002, businesswoman Su Hui-chen claimed that she bribed a legislative committee four years prior on which Chen was a member.
