= Hefei Normal University =

University in Hefei, China

- 合肥师范学院
- Motto: 爱满天下，知行合一
- Type: Public
- Established: 1955
- Location: Hefei, Anhui, China
- Website: http://www.hfnu.edu.cn/

Hefei Normal University (HFNU, simplified Chinese: 合肥师范学院; traditional Chinese: 合肥師範學院; pinyin: Héféi Shīfàn Xuéyuàn) is located in Hefei, China. Founded in 1955, it is a public full-time comprehensive university.

== Facilities and faculty ==
HFNU has three campuses in Hefei, Sanxiaokou Campus, Jinxiu Campus and Binhu Campus, covering an area of 1,295 mu (79.6 ha or 196.6 acre). The total value of teaching and research instruments and equipment is 153 million yuan, and 1.12 million books are printed. HFNU now has 15 schools, 57 undergraduate programs and 10 graduate programs, with a total of 15,700 full-time students. HFNU now has one provincial key discipline, eight characteristic majors, 16 excellent courses and nine large-scale online open courses (MOOC).

There are 792 full-time teachers, including 80 senior teachers and 236 associate teachers. There are two national-level candidates for the project, one Wanjiang Scholar lecturing professor, one Wanjiang Scholar distinguished professor, five second-level professors, 12 provincial academic and technical leaders and reserve candidates, one provincial young talents in the field of publicity and culture, 14 provincial famous teachers, and 18 provincial new teachers.

== Programs ==
HFNU has ten national, provincial and university-level excellent talent training programs, two provincial-level talent training innovation experimental areas, six provincial-level comprehensive reform pilot projects, eight provincial-level demonstration experiment (xi) training centers, 13 provincial-level teaching teams, and 5 provincial-level school-enterprise cooperative practice education bases. Hefei Football Academy, the first football academy in Anhui Province, is located in HFNU.

HFNU has established China Southern Blueberry Engineering Technology Research Center, Anhui Provincial Key Laboratory of Electronic System Simulation, Anhui Province Basic Education Reform and Development Collaborative Innovation Center, Anhui Provincial Humanities and Social Sciences Key Research Base "Teacher Education Research Center", Anhui Province Microwave

HFNU has provincial and ministerial-level scientific research platforms, including communication engineering technology research centers, Anhui Province Soul Core DSP (Digital Signal Processing) Industrialization Research Institute, and 23 school-level scientific research institutions. In the past three years, he has undertaken 46 national-level projects such as the National Social Science Fund and the Natural Science Foundation; published 1,368 academic papers; published 112 books and textbooks; won 223 national patents; and won 5 provincial science and technology awards, provincial level. There are 19 teaching achievement awards (including 2 special prizes).

HFNU runs the "National Central and Western Primary and Secondary School Teachers Training Base" and the main expert unit of Anhui Province's basic education curriculum reform; the Anhui Provincial Primary and Secondary School Teachers' Continuing Education Center, Anhui Education Management Cadre Training and Guidance Center, and Anhui Province Teacher Qualifications Identification Center; lead the formation of "Anhui Basic Education Development Alliance"; cooperate with Taiwan Ming Chuan University to establish "Anhui Education Center".

HFNU actively promotes cooperation between the state and the outside world, and cooperates the Troy University of the United States and the Athlone Institute of Technology in Ireland to carry out six Sino-foreign cooperative education projects including "2+2" and "3+1" undergraduate talent training.

The University of Ericsbury, Hildesheim University of Germany, Charles Darwin University of Australia and other 15 countries and regions have carried out student exchanges and teacher exchanges; and cooperated with Ming Chuan University in Taiwan to build Liu Mingchuan School.

== Publications ==
The Academic Journal of Hefei Normal University is a core journal of CSSCI (Chinese Social Science Citation Index). High School Mathematics Teaching directed by HFNU is rated National Outstanding Scientific Journal by Publicity Department of the CPC Central Committee.
