= Chen Shui-tsai =

Politician from Taiwan

- 陳水在

Magistrate of Kinmen County
- In office 1 May 1991 – 20 December 2001
- Preceded by: Position established
- Succeeded by: Lee Chu-feng

Personal details
- Born: 8 October 1948 (age 77) Kinmen County, Fukien Province, Republic of China
- Party: Kuomintang

Chen Shui-tsai (Chinese: 陳水在; pinyin: Chén Shuǐzài; born 8 October 1948) is a Taiwanese politician. He was the first magistrate of Kinmen County from 1993 to 2001.

== Kinmen County magistracy ==
In March 1996, during the Third Taiwan Strait Crisis, Chen suggested evacuating residents from Wuqiu, Kinmen.

=== 2010 mainland China visit ===
Chen and 180 delegates visited Xiamen in Fujian Province in December 2010 for a four-day visit to inaugurate the historic direct ferry links from Taiwan to mainland China. He said that new limited direct links between the two sides could expand into full trade, transportation and postal ties under mini Three Links before end of 2010. Chen met with Xiamen mayor Zhu Yayan.
