= Yang Cheng-wu =

Taiwanese politician

- 楊鎮浯
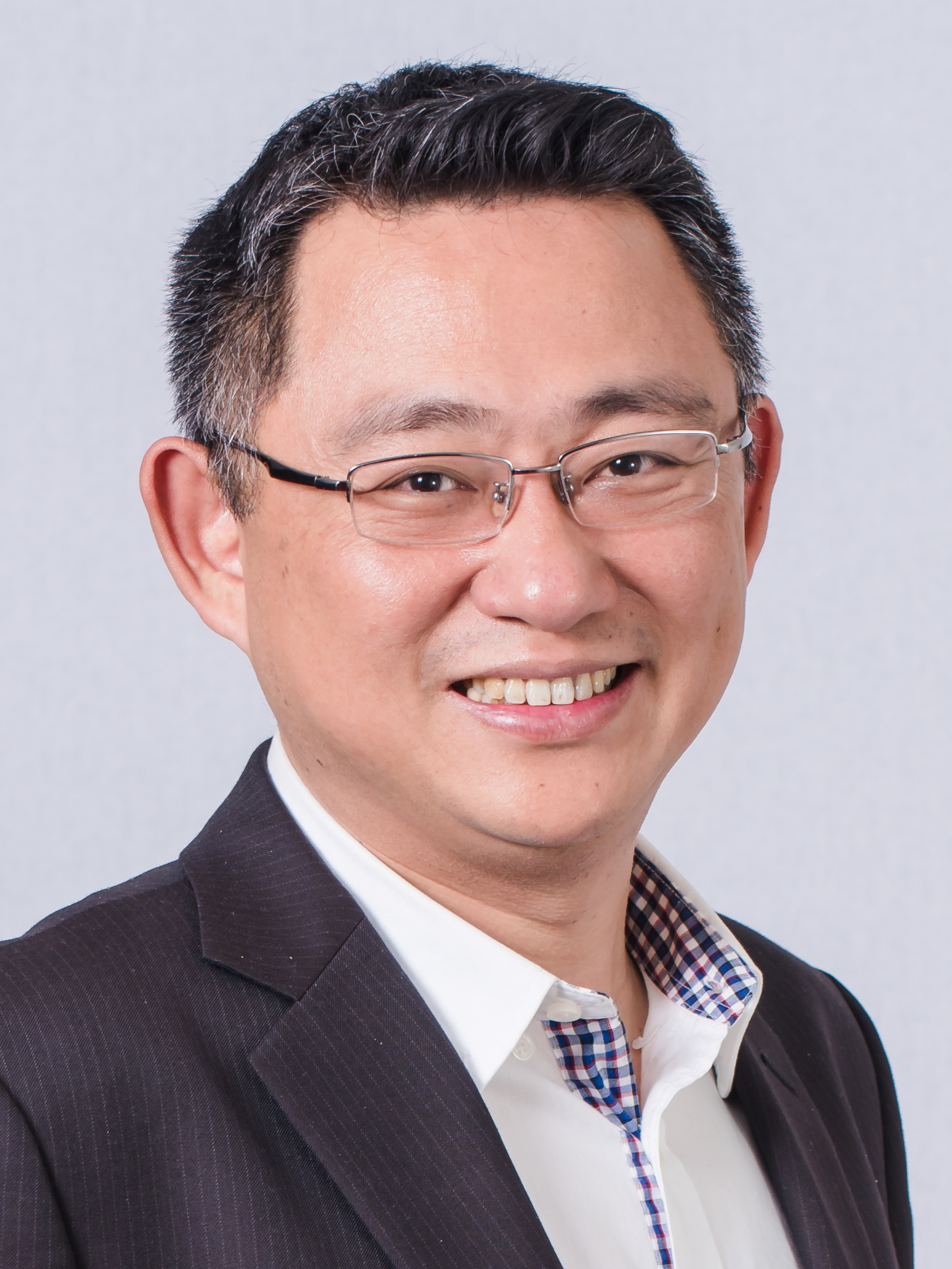

Chairman of Taipei Agricultural Products Marketing Corporation
- Incumbent
- Assumed office 30 June 2023
- General Manager: Wu Fang-ming
- Preceded by: Huang Hsiang-chun

Magistrate of Kinmen County
- In office 25 December 2018 – 25 December 2022
- Preceded by: Chen Fu-hai
- Succeeded by: Chen Fu-hai

Member of Legislative Yuan
- In office 1 February 2016 – 25 December 2018
- Preceded by: Yang Ying-hsiung
- Succeeded by: Chen Yu-chen
- Constituency: Kinmen County

Personal details
- Born: 26 June 1972 (age 53) Kinmen, Republic of China
- Party: Kuomintang
- Education: Chinese Culture University (BA); University of Westminster (MBA)

Yang Cheng-wu (Chinese: 楊鎮浯; pinyin: Yáng Zhènwú; born 26 June 1972) is a Taiwanese politician. He is the incumbent chairman of the Taipei Agricultural Products Marketing Corporation. He had served as Magistrate of Kinmen County since 25 December 2018 until 25 December 2022, having won the office in the 2018 Taiwanese local elections. Prior to contesting the magistracy, Yang represented Kinmen County in the Legislative Yuan.

== Education ==
Yang obtained his bachelor's degree in economics from Chinese Culture University and earned his Master of Business Administration (M.B.A.) from the University of Westminster in the United Kingdom.

== Political career ==
=== Legislative Yuan ===
Yang became the Ninth Legislative Yuan member after winning the 2016 general election representing Kinmen County Constituency.

In August 2017, Yang called on for closer cooperation between the Ministry of Health and Welfare and Ministry of Transportation and Communications in creating the helipad and providing the agreed medical evacuation helicopter for Kinmen residents.

In October 2017, Yang participated in the local Kinmen referendum in questioning the establishment of casino in the county. He openly opposed such establishment and supported the negative outcome of the referendum.

On 5 August 2018, Yang attended the ceremony marking the first day of Kinmen importing water from mainland China.

=== 2018 Kinmen County magistrate election ===
2018 Kuomintang Kinmen County magistrate primary results
Candidates	Place	Result
Yang Cheng-wu	Called In	Walkover

On 24 November 2018, Yang won the Kinmen County magistrate election defeating the incumbent independent Chen Fu-hai.

2018 Kinmen County mayoral results
No.	Candidate	Party	Votes	Percentage
1	Yang Cheng-wu	Kuomintang	23,520	47.48%
2	Hung Chih-heng (洪志恒)	Kinmen Gaoliang Party	832	1.69%
3	Wang Cheng-hua (汪承樺)	UNESCO budget e-league	403	0.82%
4	Chen Fu-hai	Independent	22,719	46.15%
5	Hsieh Yi-zhen (謝宜璋)	Independent	1,389	2.82%
6	Hong Ho-cheng (洪和成)	Independent	366	0.74%
Total voters			117,913	
Valid votes			49,229	
Invalid votes				
Voter turnout			41.75%	

== Magistracy ==
To develop Kinmen, Yang held his first official visit to mainland China just about two months after his inauguration as the county magistrate. While visiting Quanzhou and Xiamen in Fujian, he led a delegation from various department of the county government to promote the tourism and products of Kinmen to the mainland people.

On 12 August 2019, Yang, along with Penghu County magistrate Lai Feng-wei and Lienchiang County magistrate Liu Cheng-ying, visited Beijing and met with Taiwan Affairs Office director Liu Jieyi requesting the mainland Chinese government to lift up individual travel ban of mainland Chinese tourists to the three counties due to the constraint cross-strait relations. The mainland government eventually agreed to lift up the ban on 20 September 2019.

In late April 2020, Magistrate Yang visited Wuqiu for the first time as magistrate and stayed overnight.
