= Chen Fu-hai =

Taiwanese politician (born 1963)

- 陳福海
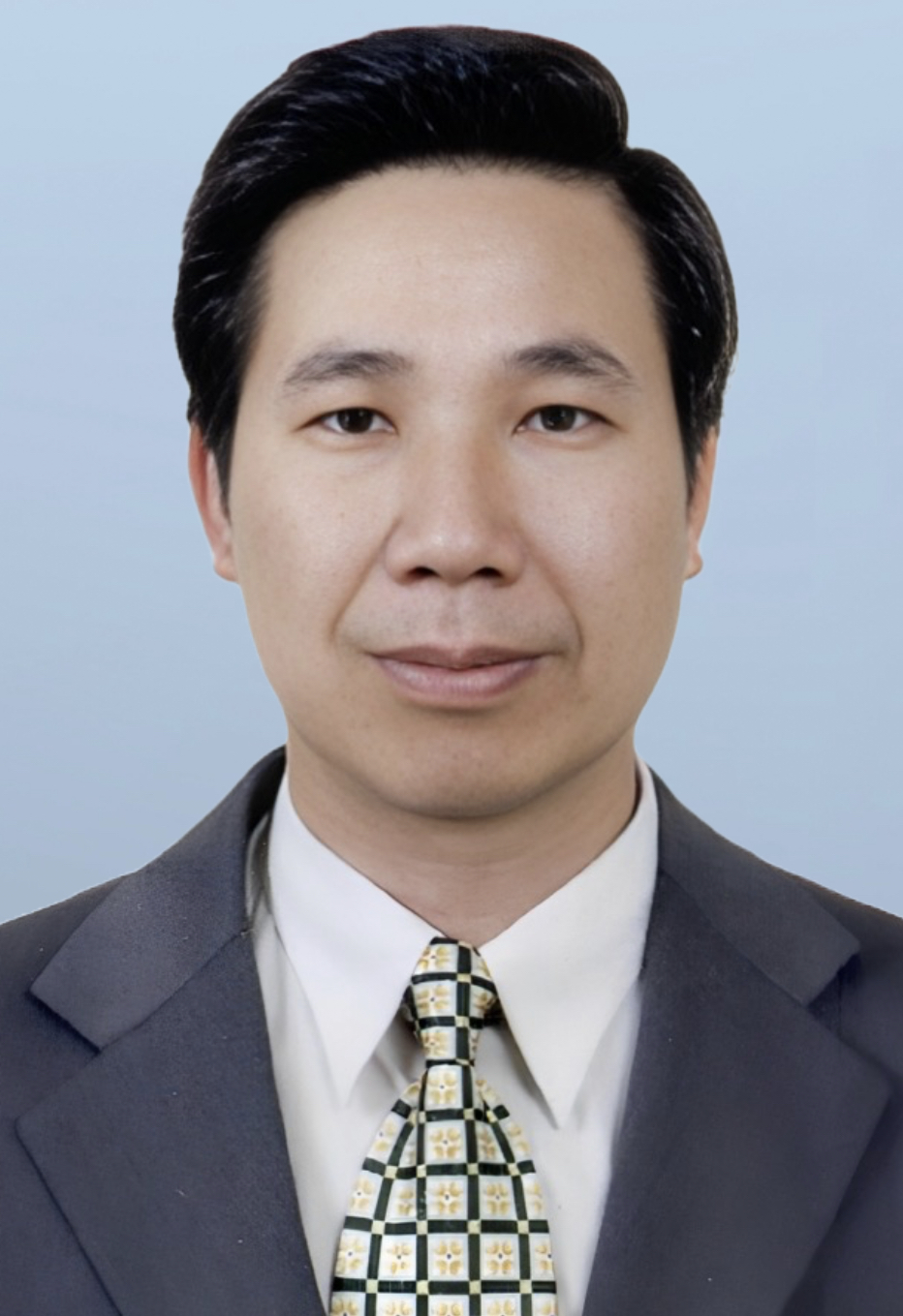
- Official portrait, 2022

4th and 6th Magistrate of Kinmen
- Incumbent
- Assumed office 25 December 2022
- Deputy: Li Wen-liang (李文良)
- Preceded by: Yang Cheng-wu
- In office 25 December 2014 – 25 December 2018
- Deputy: Wu Cherng-dean; Lin Te-kung (林德恭)
- Preceded by: Lee Wo-shih
- Succeeded by: Yang Cheng-wu

Member of the Legislative Yuan
- In office 1 February 2008 – 31 January 2012
- Preceded by: Wu Cherng-dean
- Succeeded by: Yang Ying-hsiung
- Constituency: Kinmen County

Personal details
- Born: 3 June 1963 (age 62) Kinmen, Fujian
- Party: Taiwan People's Party
- Other political affiliations: Independent (until 2022)
- Education: National Open University (BA); National University of Kaohsiung (MA); Huazhong University of Science and Technology (PhD)

Chen Fu-hai (Chinese: 陳福海; pinyin: Chén Fúhǎi; born 3 June 1963) is a Taiwanese politician. He was the Magistrate of Kinmen County from 2014 to 2018, and again since 25 December 2022 as an independent politician.

== Education ==
Chen graduated from National Open University with a bachelor's degree in public science. He then earned a master's degree in public administration from the National University of Kaohsiung and a Ph.D. in public administration in Hubei from the Huazhong University of Science and Technology.

== Early political career ==
Chen was a member of the Kinmen County Council from 1994 to 1998. He was the mayor of Jinhu Township from 1998 to 2006.

Chen was elected as a legislator on 12 January 2008.

| No. | Candidate | Party | Votes | Ratio |
|---|---|---|---|---|
| 1 | Chen Fu-hai | Independent | 9,912 | 37.31% |
| 2 | Lee Wo-shih | Independent | 5,274 | 19.85% |
| 3 | Gao Sian-teng (高絃騰) | Civil Party | 39 | 0.15% |
| 4 | Hu Wei-sheng (胡偉生) | Independent | 1,070 | 4.03% |
| 5 | Tang Huei-pei (唐惠霈) | Democratic Progressive Party | 431 | 1.62% |
| 6 | Wu Cherng-dean | Kuomintang (New Party Endorsement) | 9,838 | 37.04% |

== Magistracy ==
=== 2014 Kinmen County magistrate election ===
Chen was elected as the Magistrate of Kinmen County after winning the 2014 Kinmen County magistrate election held on 29 November 2014.

2014 Kinmen County Magistrate Election Result
| No. | Candidate | Party | Votes | Percentage |
|---|---|---|---|---|
| 1 | Su Long-ke (蘇龍科) | Independent | 470 | 1.03% |
| 2 | Lei You-jing (雷由靖) | Independent | 132 | 0.29% |
| 3 | Chen Fu-hai | Independent | 23,965 | 52.77% |
| 4 | Lee Wo-shih | KMT | 15,146 | 33.35% |
| 5 | Wang Cheng-hua (汪成華) | The Guarantee of Educational, Scientific and Cultural Budget e-Union | 403 | 0.89% |
| 6 | Hong Zhi-heng (洪志恒) | Independent | 636 | 1.40% |
| 7 | Zhuang Yu-min (莊育民) | Independent | 236 | 0.52% |
| 8 | Lin Suei-Chuan (林水泉) | Independent | 240 | 0.53% |
| 9 | Shiu Nai-chiuan (許乃權) | Independent | 3,834 | 8.44% |
| 10 | Yang Rong-xiang (楊榮祥) | Independent | 354 | 0.78% |

=== 2015 Zhang Zhijun visit to Kinmen ===
During the two-day visit of Taiwan Affairs Office Director Zhang Zhijun to Kinmen, Chen wished that Beijing would enhance their assistance to Kinmen because people on both sides of the Taiwan Straits are close like family and could work together to achieve the Chinese Dream.

=== 2015 Strait Forum ===
During the 7th Straits Forum in Xiamen, Fujian in June 2015, Chen said that he would strive to support Kinmen to become a pilot zone for trade and economic cooperation between the two sides of the Taiwan Straits.

=== 2018 Kinmen County magistrate election ===
2018 Kinmen County mayoral results
| No. | Candidate | Party | Votes | Percentage |
|---|---|---|---|---|
| 1 | Yang Cheng-wu | Kuomintang | 23,520 | 47.48% |
| 2 | Hung Chih-heng (洪志恒) | Kinmen Gaoliang Party | 832 | 1.69% |
| 3 | Wang Cheng-hua (汪承樺) | UNESCO budget e-league | 403 | 0.82% |
| 4 | Chen Fu-hai | Independent | 22,719 | 46.15% |
| 5 | Hsieh Yi-zhen (謝宜璋) | Independent | 1,389 | 2.82% |
| 6 | Hong Ho-cheng (洪和成) | Independent | 366 | 0.74% |
| Total voters | | | 117,913 | |
| Valid votes | | | 49,229 | |
| Invalid votes | | | | |
| Voter turnout | | | 41.75% | |
