= List of county magistrates of Kinmen =

This is a list of magistrates of Kinmen County. The incumbent Magistrate is independent Chen Fu-hai since 25 December 2022.

== List of Magistrates ==
Kuomintang New Party Independent Taiwan People's Party

| № | Portrait | Name (Birth–Death) | Term of Office | | Term | Political Party |
|---|---|---|---|---|---|---|
| 1 | | Chen Shui-tsai 陳水在; Chén Shuǐzài (1948–) | 20 December 1993 | 20 December 1997 | 1 | Kuomintang |
| 1 | | Chen Shui-tsai 陳水在; Chén Shuǐzài (1948–) | 20 December 1997 | 20 December 2001 | 2 | Kuomintang |
| 2 | | Lee Chu-feng 李炷烽; Lǐ Zhùfēng (1953–) | 20 December 2001 | 20 December 2005 | 3 | New Party |
| 2 | | Lee Chu-feng 李炷烽; Lǐ Zhùfēng (1953–) | 20 December 2005 | 20 December 2009 | 4 | New Party |
| 3 | | Lee Wo-shih 李沃士; Lǐ Wòshì (1960-) | 20 December 2009 | 25 December 2014 | 5 | Kuomintang |
| 4 | | Chen Fu-hai 陳福海; Chén Fúhǎi (1963-) | 25 December 2014 | 25 December 2018 | 6 | Independent |
| 5 | | Yang Cheng-wu 楊鎮浯; Yáng Zhènwú (1972-) | 25 December 2018 | 25 December 2022 | 7 | Kuomintang |
| (4) | | Chen Fu-hai 陳福海; Chén Fúhǎi (1963-) | 25 December 2022 | Incumbent | 8 | Independent Taiwan People's Party |

== See also ==
- Kinmen County
