= Zhufan =

Xizhufan 西朱范村
- Village
- Location in Jiangsu
- Coordinates: 34°50′33″N 118°48′06″E
- Country: People's Republic of China
- Province: Jiangsu
- Prefecture-level city: Lianyungang
- County: Donghai
- Town: Shilianghe (石梁河镇)

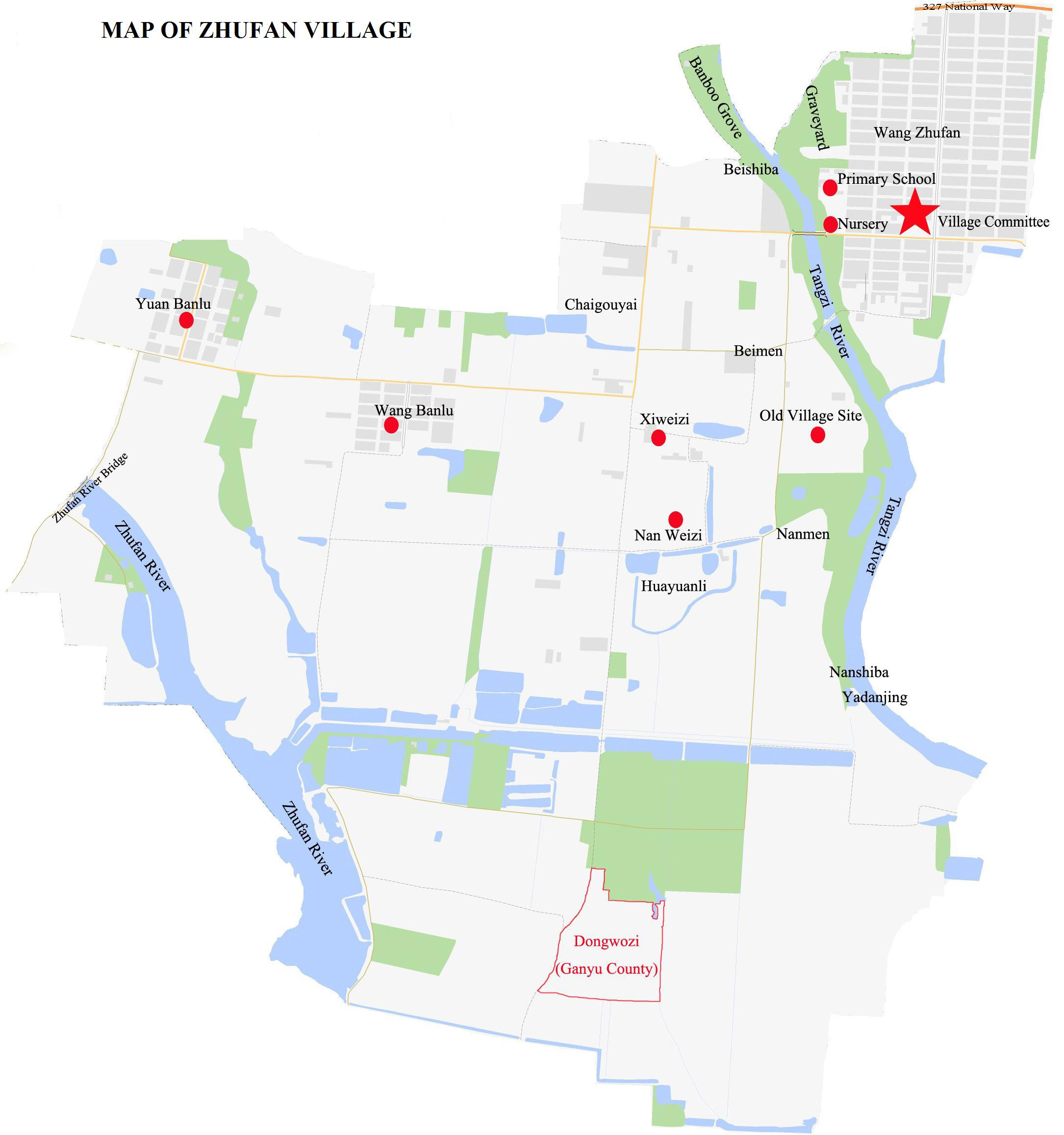
Map of Zhufan Village

Zhufan (simplified Chinese: 朱范; traditional Chinese: 朱範; pinyin: zhūfàn), also called West Zhufan or Xizhufan (Chinese: 西朱范村), is an administrative village governed by Shilianghe Town of Donghai County, in the north of Jiangsu Province, China.

The village lies in the west of Ganyu District of Lianyungang, and borders Shandong Province to the northwest. Tangzi River is in the east, and Zhufan River is in the southwest.

Until the 1980s, Zhufan was located on the Tangzi River's western bank, earning it the nickname "Hexi" (River West) among the locals. Due to flood damage in the 1980s, a new village was built to the northeast of the old village, and the village is now located on the Tangzi River's eastern bank. It now includes Wang Zhufan, Wang Banlu, and Yuan Banlu.

== Geography ==
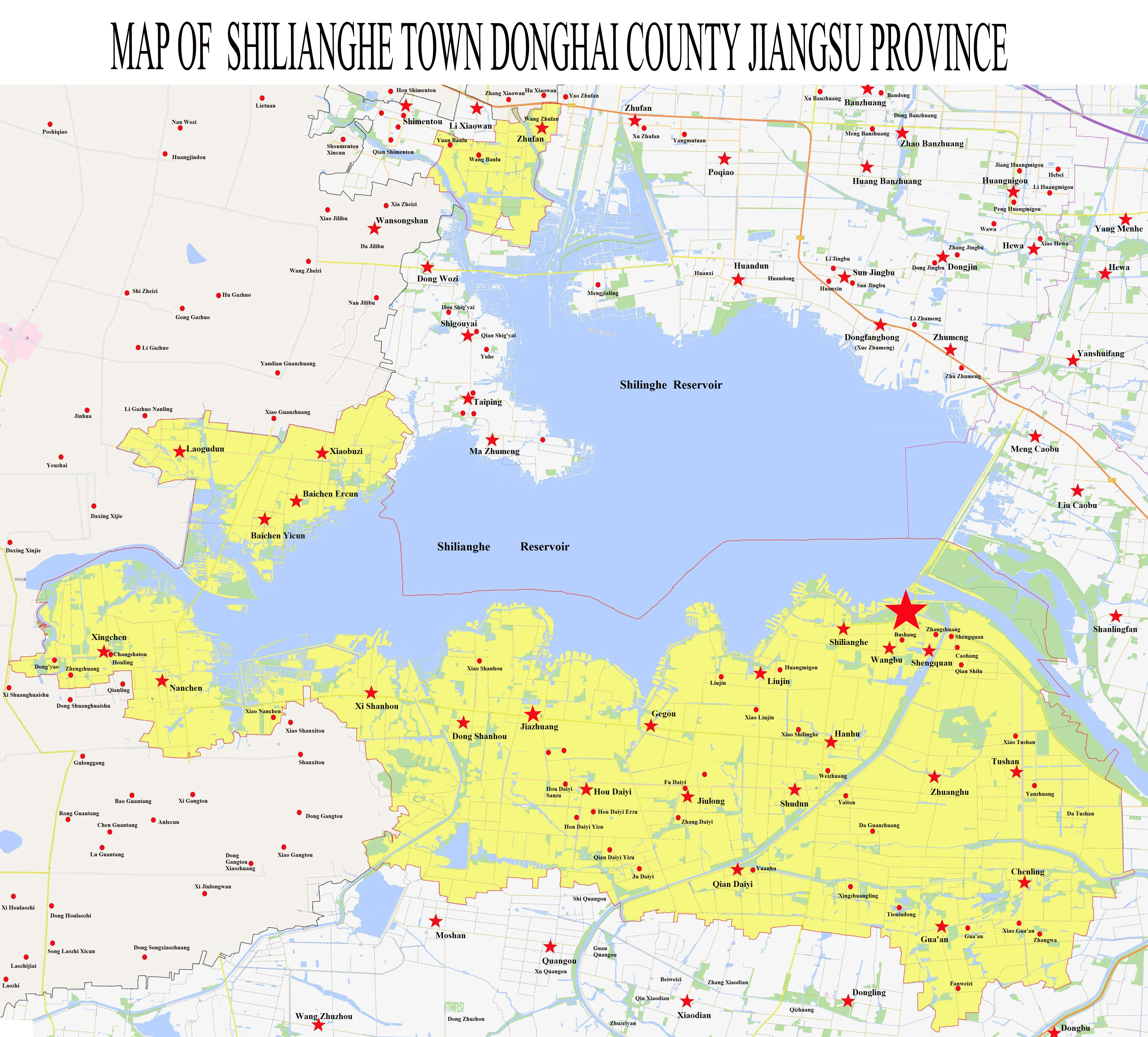
Map of Shilinghe Town

=== Landscape and rivers ===
The village is located in the low flat plain, bounded between the Zhufan and Tangzi rivers.

The Tangzi River is formed by the confluence of two rivers. The larger one flows southward from the eastern upland area of Yushan Town in Linshu County, Shandong Province. The small one flows southwest from Ganyu County in Jiangsu Province's western hilly countries. The two rivers enter Zhufan to the south of G327 and meet to the west of the Public Tomb Area and to the east of Zhufan's Bamboo Yard. Then it flows southward, then eastward for 570 meters at Yandan Jing (Duck Egg Well), then southward again and into the Reservoir Shilianghe, west of Mengjialing Village.

River Zhufan also has two sources. The small source, River Zhufan, flows southward from Mount Cangma in Linshu Town, Linshu County, and converges in Reservoir Jiaolong. River Mutuan is a large source formed in the western hilly countries of Yushan Town in Linshu County. The two sources meet between Lietuan Village and Zhangtuan Village, flow southeastward, and meet at Reservoir Shilianghe in Dongwozi Village's east.

Before the construction of Reservoir Shilianghe in 1958, River Tangzi was also historically known as River Dongjiawan after Dongjiawan Village, located west of Mengjialing Village. In the past, River Tangzi and River Zhufan combined near Sanjiaowang Village to form River Dasha, a larger river. After then, River Shiliang, created from Mount Maling, merged with River Dasha. In Linhongkou, the River Dasha flowed southeast and entered the Yellow Sea. The New River Shoo was created after 1949 from the riverbeds of the River Shilianghe and the River Dasha.

=== Climate ===
Zhufan has a monsoon-influenced climate with generous summer precipitation, cold, dry winters, and hot, humid in summers. Under the Köppen climate classification, is in the transition from the humid subtropical zone (Cwa) to the humid continental zone (Dwa), though favouring the former. More than half of the annual precipitation of 831 mm (32.7 in) falls in July and August alone, and the frost-free period is above 200 days.

== Economy ==
Zhufan's economy is heavily dependent on crop farming and construction. Crops include wheat, rice paddy, peanut, corn, and soybean. The other crops such as red adzuki beans, and mung beans are planted occasionally on some small fields. Usually, women and old men are the main laborers in farming. Most of the younger men are construction workers. Minor industries include wood, meat processing, and cement products.

Zhufan has a country fair for the adjoining areas. The villagers buy and sell food, clothes, necessities, hardware, and farming tools on some fixed days of every month as per the Lunar Calendar. There are also some small markets in the village.

== Demography ==
=== Population ===
According to China's 2010 census, the village had a population of 3,200. All the villagers are Han Chinese.

Wang is the most popular family name in the village. It covers two families: Sanhuaitang and Yeyutang.

The family of Sanghuaitang declares that they came from Danglu, a little village near Huaguoshan of Lianyungang. Neither paper nor oral legend records when they arrived at this village, but it was much earlier than the family of Yeyutang.

The family of Yeyutang came from Dengzhou of Shandong Province during Chongzhen (1628~1644 BCE; year's name of Emperor Sizong Zhu Youjian) in the Ming dynasty. The ancestor who came to the village was a fisherman. The family regards Xinzhuang, a village near Qingkou of Ganyu County, as their home place.

However, the latest genealogy research shows that the two families are descended from a man named Wang Ying, who lived in the later period of Southern Song dynasty. Wang Ying's elder son became the ancestor of Yeyutang Family, and the junior was the ancestor of Sanhuaitang Family.

Other families' names include Zhu, Xu, Xiang, Li, Yuan, Liu, Lǚ, and Zhang; about 10% of families use them.

=== Religion ===
Chinese folk beliefs are practiced widely. The villagers worship ancestors, ghosts, and kinds of gods. But there are no fixed religious places and rites. Villagers can perform rites by themselves in the ancestors' tombs or tomb courtyards.

Some old men and women also practice Christianity, taking part in religious gatherings, listening to preachings, and singing religious songs. They usually cannot distinguish Christ from other gods worshiped by most of the Chinese people. They believe that Christ may have greater power than common Chinese gods. Some villagers regard Christianity as a cult because Christians are usually more passionate about religious affairs than other topics.

=== Dialect ===
The dialect of Zhufan is a kind of Central Plains Mandarin, but has many differences because the village lies in the easternmost edge of that dialect's area. The system of consonants and vowels of the local dialect are like Ganyu dialect, which is more similar to Jiaoliao Mandarin than Central Plains Mandarin. Tones are more similar to Central Plain dialect than Ganyu dialect. The local dialect also uses some characters of pronunciation and many words from Jiaoliao Mandarin.

The consonant /w/ and the vowel /u/ do not exist, and are replaced by /v/. There is also no initial letter 'R' in Standard Mandarin. For example, the 'Re' (热, hot) and 'Ye' (叶, leaf) are homonyms in the local dialect. Some consonant clusters exist in the local accent, for example, /kl/ and /pl/.

Comparatively, the local people speak usually a little quicker.

== Administration and politics ==
Since the early 1950s, there have been three natural villages in Zhufan: Wang Zhufan, Yuan Banlu, and Wang Banlu. Zhufan is divided into 7 villager groups (the basic managing unit of the village, according to Organic Law of Village Committees): Wang Zhufan comprises villager groups 1–5, Wang Banlu is the 6th villager group, and Yuan Banlu is the 7th villager group.

In mainland China, an administrative village serves as a fundamental organizational unit for a rural population, not as part of a system of government. As a bureaucratic entity, the director of the village committee is a corporate representative and is traditionally called the Village Chief by the villagers. The election of the director of the village committee is held every three years. Influence over the election usually comes from the township government, large clans, the rich, and even the gangsters. The latest election was held in 2011.

The Chinese Communist Party is the sole legal party. Its secretary of the village branch is the supreme leader de facto of the village. The percentage of communist party members is less than 1% of all villagers, and most of them are only statistical members of the Party.

== History ==
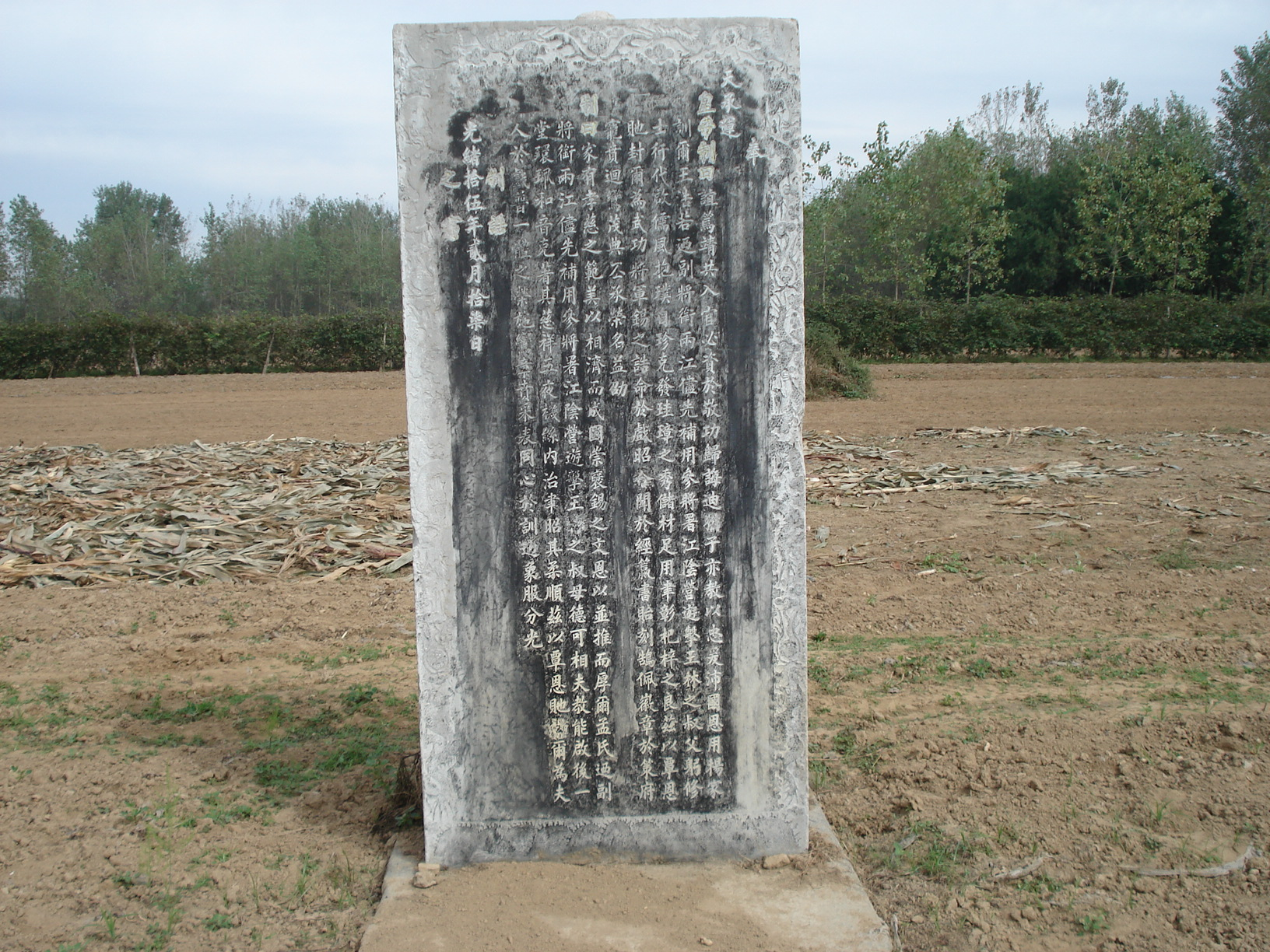
Imperial edict stele dating from the Qing dynasty

=== Entomology ===
The name Zhufan was first mentioned in a genealogy book of Yeyutang Wangshi, written in the 1850s.

There are no records of when the village was founded. According to legend, the earliest residents were all members of the Fan family, and the village was also called "Fanjia Zhuang" (the village of Fan family). Hundreds of years later, the family of Zhu gradually replaced the Fan and became the main residents. Thus, the village's name changed to "Zhufan Zhuang" (the village of Fan and Zhu families). Years later, the Wang family arrived and became the main residents in the early Ming dynasty. The name of the village changed to Wangzhufan and has remained as such.

=== Administration ===
There is a historic site of ancient Zhuqi in Gucheng Village of Ganyu County, about 1.5 km northeast from Zhufan. Zhuqi was a small vassal state, whose founder and founding time are not clear. During early Dong Zhou dynasty, it was conquered by the State of Lu and became one of Lu's border cities. From the Qin dynasty to the Tang dynasty, Zhuqi was a county site, before being combined with Huairen County (i.e. Ganyu County).

In the Ming and Qing dynasties, it became the border of Yichow Fu of Shandong province and was governed by Lanshan County.

Lanshan County changed its name to Linyi County during the Republic of China. Jufan is a village under Linshu Town of Linyi County. Linshu Town became the Fifth District of Linyi County in 1934.

During the Second Sino-Japanese War, Zhufan was the center of an area controlled by the Chinese Communist Party and the seat of division headquarters of the 18th Army 115 Division. The Communist Party divided the eastern part of Linyi County, the western part of Ganyu County, and the northeastern part of Tancheng County to create a new county named Linshu. Zhufan became a village in this new county.

After the Communist Party obtained control over Mainland China, most areas were reorganized. Zhufan was divided into five small villages: Wang Zhufan, Xu Zhufan, Yao Zhufan, Wang Banlu, and Yuan Banlu. Every village has its own basic branch of the Communist Party ruling the village.

In 1962, the Reservoir Shilianghe was completed and stored water. Thus, Zhufan became submerged, and villagers had to move northward. But the new houses were bad due to corruption of the Communist officials; many houses collapsed during summer rainstorms. So, the villagers had to move back to the old site to build new houses.

In April 1971, Zhufan was put under Jiangsu Province. The villagers were not willing to live in Ganyu County, so the Zhufan became a village of Donghai County. In 1978, Zhufan was a village in Nanchen Town.

During the early 1980s, the villagers built their new home in the farthest northeastern part of the village, near G327.

In February 2013, Nanchen Town and Shilianghe Town were combined into a new Shilianghe Town.
