= Äynu =

Äynu may refer to:

- Äynu people of Western China
- Äynu language, their Turkic language

== See also ==
- Aynu (disambiguation)
