= Ainu =

Ainu or Aynu may refer to:

- Ainu people, an East Asian ethnic group of Japan and the Russian Far East
  - Ainu languages, a family of languages
    - Ainu language of Hokkaido
    - Kuril Ainu language, extinct language of the Kuril Islands
    - Sakhalin Ainu language, extinct language from the island of Sakhalin
  - Ainu music
  - Ainu cuisine
- Ainu (Middle-earth), spirit in J. R. R. Tolkien's legendarium
- Ainu (insect), a beetle in the family Tenebrionidae
- Äynu people, of Western China
  - Äynu language

== See also ==
- Äynu (disambiguation)
- Ainur (disambiguation)
- Aino (disambiguation)
- Aniu, character from Balto II
