= Aino =

Aino may refer to:

== Fictional characters ==
- Aino, a character in Genshin Impact
- Aino (character), a figure in the Finnish national epic poem Kalevala
- Minako or Mina Aino, alter ego of Sailor Venus in the Sailor Moon franchise

== Places ==
- Aino Station (Hyōgo), a train station in Sanda, Hyōgo Prefecture, Japan
- Aino Station (Shizuoka), a train station in Fukuroi, Shizuoka Prefecture, Japan
- Aino, Nagasaki, Japan, a former town, merged in 2005 into the city of Unzen
- Mount Aino, a mountain in Japan

== Other uses ==
- Aino (given name), a first name in Finland and Estonia
- Ainu people (sometimes called Aino), an ethnic group of northern Japan
- Ainu language (also sometimes called Aino), the language of the Ainu people
- Sony Ericsson Aino, a telephone
- Aino (Kajanus), a symphonic poem for male chorus and orchestra by Robert Kajanus
- Aino (opera), a 1912 opera by Erkki Melartin based on the Kalevala

== See also ==
- Ainos (disambiguation)
- Ainu (disambiguation)
