= Shoumeng =

King of Wu from 585 to 561 BC

- King of Wu
- Reign: 585 BC - 561 BC
- Issue: King Liao of Wu; Zhufan, King of Wu; Yuji, King of Wu; Lord Queyou; Yumei, King of Wu; Lord Jizha; Lord Yanyu; Lord Zhuyung
- Father: Quqi (去齊)

Shoumeng (Chinese: 壽夢, d. 561 BC) was the 19th ruler and first king of the state of Wu in the Spring and Autumn period of Chinese history.

== Background ==
It was under Shoumeng's reign that Wu first began to interact with the other Spring and Autumn states.

Information about the history of Wu prior to Shoumeng is scarce: the Records of the Grand Historian lists the names of 18 rulers before him, but provides no exact regnal dates or biographical information. As such, the only known fact about Shoumeng's father and predecessor is that his name was Quqi (去齊).

== Biography ==
Shoumeng ascended the throne in 586 BC and was the first Wu ruler to use the title "king", implying equality in rank to the king of Zhou. In the second year of Shoumeng's reign, he forged an alliance with Jin, which provided him with modern weapons and training in exchange for his help against Jin's rival Chu. Wu would repeatedly attack Chu in the coming years, and was itself invaded by Chu in Shoumeng's 16th year.

Shoumeng ruled for 25 years. On his deathbed, he had wanted his fourth and youngest son Jizha to succeed him, but Jizha refused. Thus, Shoumeng devised a succession model where his sons would become kings one after the other, hoping that by the time the turn came to Jizha, he would have changed his mind. However, after Shoumeng's death, Jizha stuck to his refusal for the remainder of his life, with the next king instead being the third brother's son.
