= Luoyang dialect =

Zhongyuan Mandarin dialect of Henan, China

Luoyang
- 洛陽話
- Native to: China
- Region: Luoyang, Henan
- Language family: Sino-Tibetan: Sinitic; Chinese; Mandarin; Central Plains; Luoyang

Language codes
- ISO 639-3: –
- Glottolog: None

The Luoyang dialect is a dialect of Zhongyuan Mandarin spoken in Luoyang and nearby parts of Henan province.

The old Luoyang dialect served as one of historical standards of Chinese from the Warring States period into the Ming Dynasty, which distinguish from the modern Luoyang dialect. It is because Luoyang switched from Southern to Northern Mandarin over history. According to Lü Shuxiang (1985), "In Northern Song dynasty, the dialects at the Central Plains are still in the southern variety [of Mandarin]; the predecessor of modern Northern Mandarin began as a tiny regional dialect near Khanbaliq". (Note: Jerry Norman (1997 [2004]) elaborated further on Luoyang's history of Southern Mandarin.)

== Phonology ==
=== Initials ===
		Labial	Alveolar		Retroflex	Alveolo- palatal	Velar
		Labial	plain	sibilant	Retroflex	Alveolo- palatal	Velar
Nasal		m	n				
Plosive/ Affricate	tenuis	p	t	ts	ʈʂ	tɕ	k
Plosive/ Affricate	aspirated	pʰ	tʰ	tsʰ	ʈʂʰ	tɕʰ	kʰ
Continuant	voiceless	f		s	ʂ	ɕ	x
Continuant	voiced	v	l		ʐ		ɣ

w	Labio-velar approximant
ɥ	Labio-palatal approximant
j	Palatal approximant

=== Features ===
- The Middle Chinese entering tone has a different distribution in the Luoyang dialect than in Standard Mandarin. (See entering tone for more.)
- Tone contours are different from those in Standard Mandarin.
- The retroflex and alveolar fricatives are found in different distributions: retroflex fricatives in Standard are often fronted to alveolar fricatives in Luoyang.
- The distinction between /w/ and /v/, lost in Standard, is maintained in Luoyang.
- The retroflex series is less retroflexed than in Standard Mandarin and slightly further forward.
- The alveolo-palatal series is slightly further back than in Standard Mandarin.
- Standard final /œ/ and /ɑu/ are often backed to [ɔ] in Luoyang. For example, 学 (Standard [ɕɥœ̌]/[ɕɥě], to learn) is [ɕɥɔ], and 角 (Standard [tɕjɑù]/[tɕjàʊ], horn) is [tɕɥɔ].
- Standard final /əi/ is pronounced [ɯ] or [i] in certain environments in Luoyang.
- Standard final /n/ nasalizes the preceding vowel in the Luoyang Dialect.
- The -儿 suffix is pronounced /ɯ/.

== Notes ==
=== References ===
- Kurparska, Maria (2010) [1977], Chinese Language(s) : A Look Through the Prism of The Great Dictionary of Modern Chinese Dialects, Berlin; New York: Walter de Gruyter, ISBN 9783110219142, OCLC 733240264
- Pulleyblank, Edwin G. (1983), Middle Chinese : A Study in Historical Phonology, Vancouver: The University of British Columbia Press, ISBN 9780774801928, OCLC 11266119
- Kaske, Elisabeth (2008), The Politics of Language in Chinese Education : 1895—1919, Leiden; Danvers: Koninklijke Brill, ISBN 9789047423331, OCLC 317454513
- Dong, Hongyuan (2014), A History of the Chinese Language, Abingdon; New York: Routledge, ISBN 9781317743903, OCLC 877772203
