= Ecopa Arena =

Indoor arena in Fukuroi, Shizuoka, Japan

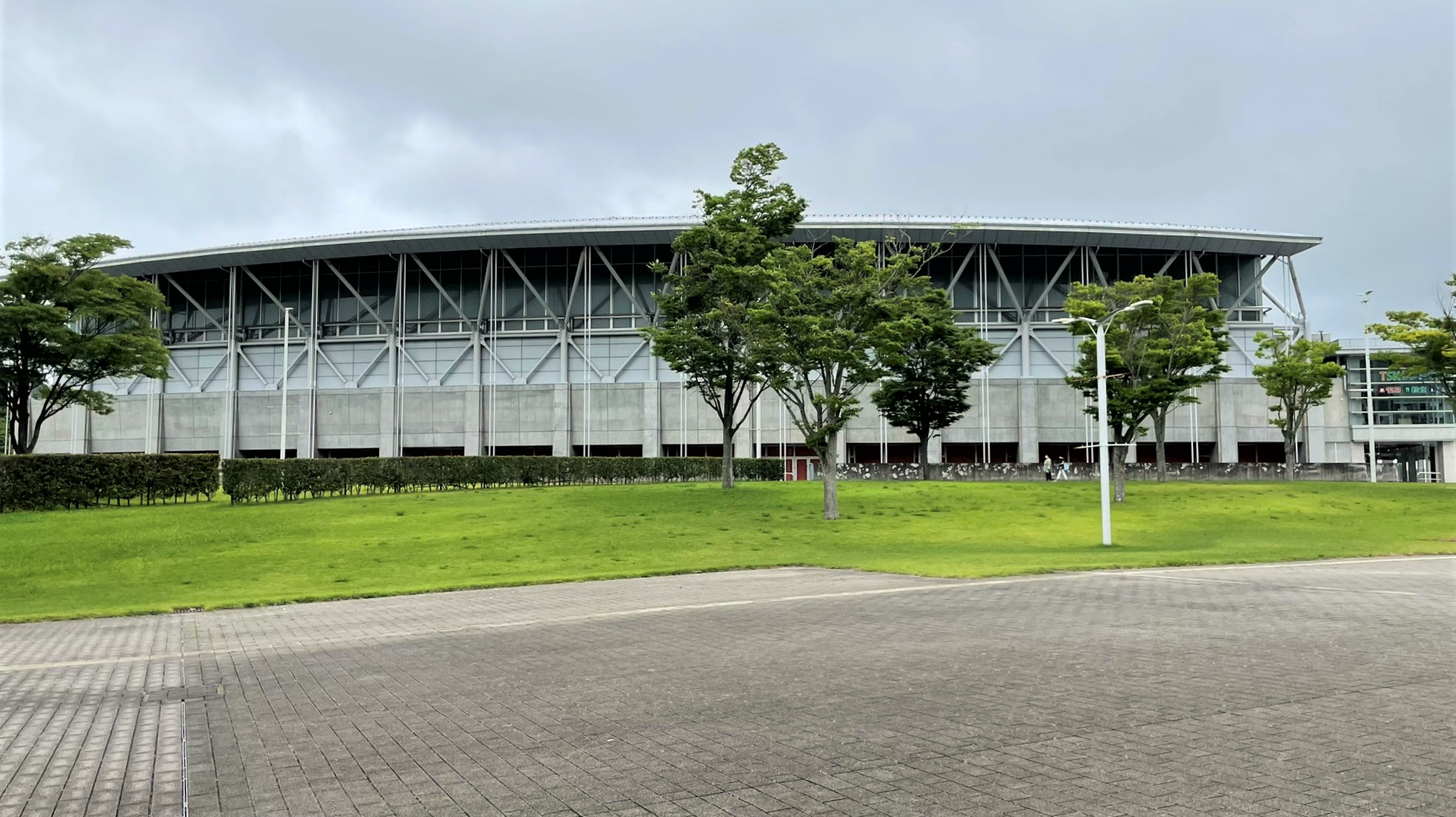
- Interactive map of Ecopa Arena
- Location: Fukuroi, Shizuoka, Japan
- Coordinates: 34.7452359°N 137.9687226°E
- Owner: Shizuoka Prefecture
- Operator: Shizuoka Prefectural Football Association
- Capacity: 10,000

Construction
- Opened: 14 December 2001
- Cost: JPY10.0989 billion

Ecopa Arena is a multi-purpose indoor arena in Fukuroi, Japan. The arena has a capacity of 10,000 and was opened in 2001.

== Other facilities ==
- Ecopa Stadium

== Access ==
Train

- JR: Tokaido Main Line, Aino Station

Car

- Tomei Expressway: Kakegawa Interchange
- Tomei Expressway : Fukuroi Interchange
