= Mikuriyama Kofun group =

Group of kofun burial mounds in Japan

- 御厨古墳群 (Japanese)
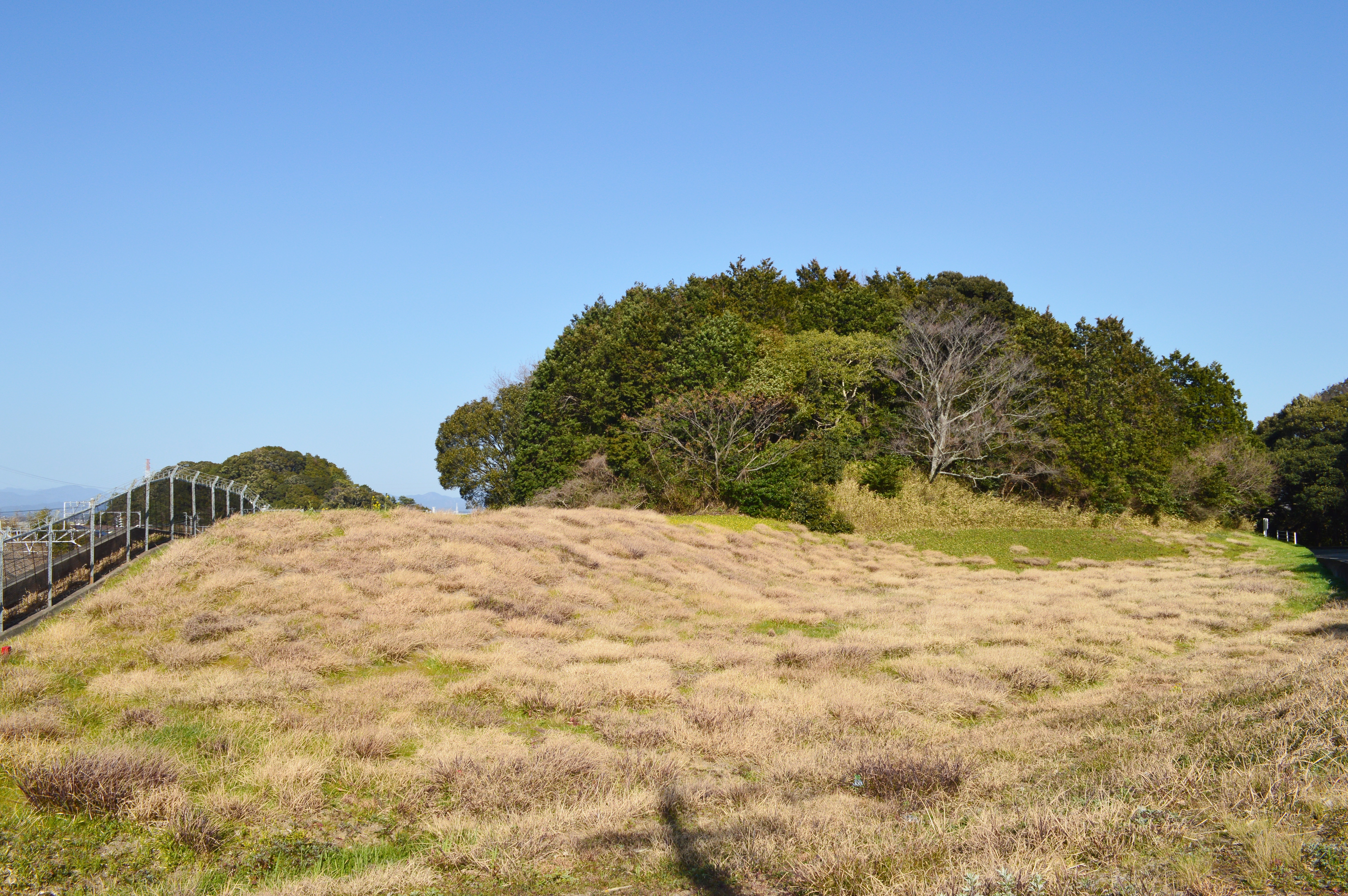
- Shorinzan Kofun

- Mikuriyama Kofun Mikuriyama Kofun group (Japan)
- 34°43′11″N 137°53′17″E
- Type: kofun
- Periods: Kofun period
- Location: Iwata, Shizuoka, Japan
- Region: Tōkai region

History
- Built: 3rd to 4th century AD

Site notes
- Public access: Yes (no public facilities)

Mikuriyama Kofun group (御厨古墳群, Mikuriyama Kofun gun) is group of kofun burial mounds located in between the Shingai and Kamata neighborhoods of the city of Iwata, Shizuoka in the Tōkai region of Japan. The site was designated a National Historic Site of Japan in 2001.

== Overview ==
The site consists of five large burial mounds, located in the southeastern part of the Iwatahara Plateau on the eastern bank of the Tenryū River, which are part of a large cluster of more than 500 kofun, most of which have now been destroyed by urban encroachment and the construction of the Tōkaidō Main Line railway tracks, which cuts through the site.

The Shorinzan Kofun (松林山古墳), with a total length of 107 meters, is the largest of the group. It is a zenpō-kōen-fun (前方後円墳), which is shaped like a keyhole, having one square end and one circular end, when viewed from above. It is located south of the railroad tracks and on the north side of Shimmei Junior High School. It has a 66.5 meter diameter posterior circular portion with a height of ten meters. An excavation was conducted in 1931, at which time a long stone burial chamber was discovered with a large number of grave goods, including one triangular-rimmed bronze mirror, one bronze mirror depicting four animals, two bronze mirrors depicting flowers, magatama, tubular beads, weapons (straight swords, iron and bronze spears, daggers) and agricultural tools (axes, sickles, saws), and Sue ware pottery were discovered. The mound was covered in fukiishi and the remains of many haniwa were found. From the artifacts, the tumulus is estimate to date from the second half of the 4th century.

The Takeneyama Kofun (高根山古墳) is a circular-type tumulus (empun (円墳)) with a diameter of 52 meters and height of eight meters. It is also located to the south of the railroad tracks, and is the third largest in the prefecture. The surface was covered with fukiishi and both cylindrical and pot-shaped hanawa. It was built at the end of the 4th century. It was excavated from 1997 to 1998.

The Mikuridōyama Kofun (御厨堂山古墳) is a keyhole-shaped tumulus with total length of 34.5 meters and height of four meters. A bronze mirror and an iron sword have been recovered from its interior. It is also located to the south of the railroad tracks. It was excavated from 1997 to 1998.

The Inariyama Kofun (稲荷山古墳) and the Akihayama Kofun (秋葉山古墳) are both located to the north of the Tōkaidō Main Line railway tracks, behind the Buddhist temple of Renjō-ji, and are survivors of what was once a group of four tumuli. The Inariyama Kofun is a 48-meter long, six meter high keyhole-shaped tumulus and the Akihayama Kofun is a 54-meter diameter, eight meter high circular tumulus. The now-vanished Kyōzuka Kofun (経塚古墳) was a keyhole-shaped tomb with a length of 90 meters, but was destroyed in the early Meiji period to make way for the Tōkaidō Main Line railway, during which time an ancient bronze mirror was recovered. Jar-shaped haniwa have been recovered from the vicinity.

The site is located a five-minute walk from the "Shinmei-mae" bus stop on the Entetsu Bus from Iwata Station on the JR East Tōkaidō Main Line.

== Gallery ==
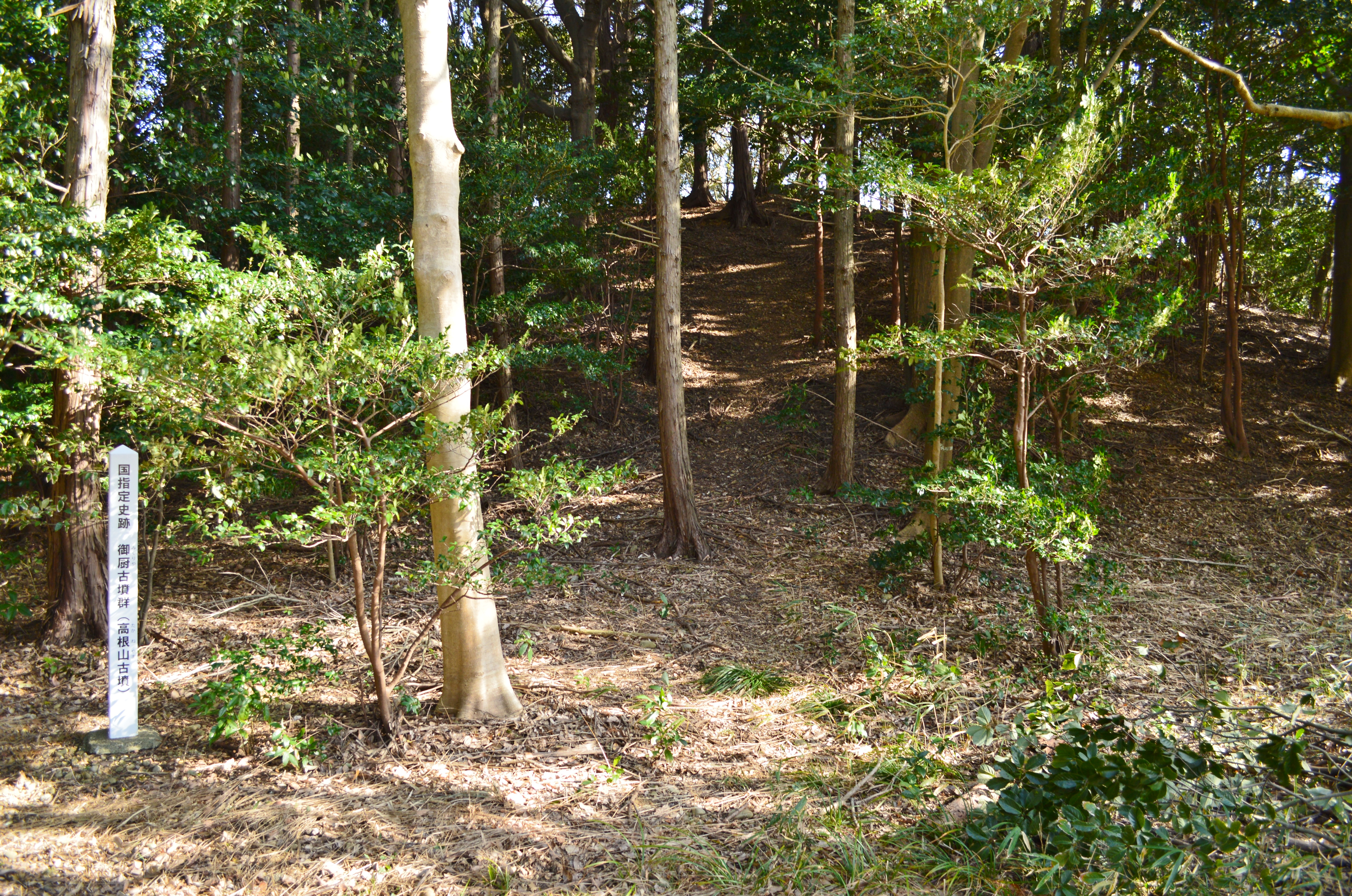
Takaneyama Kofun

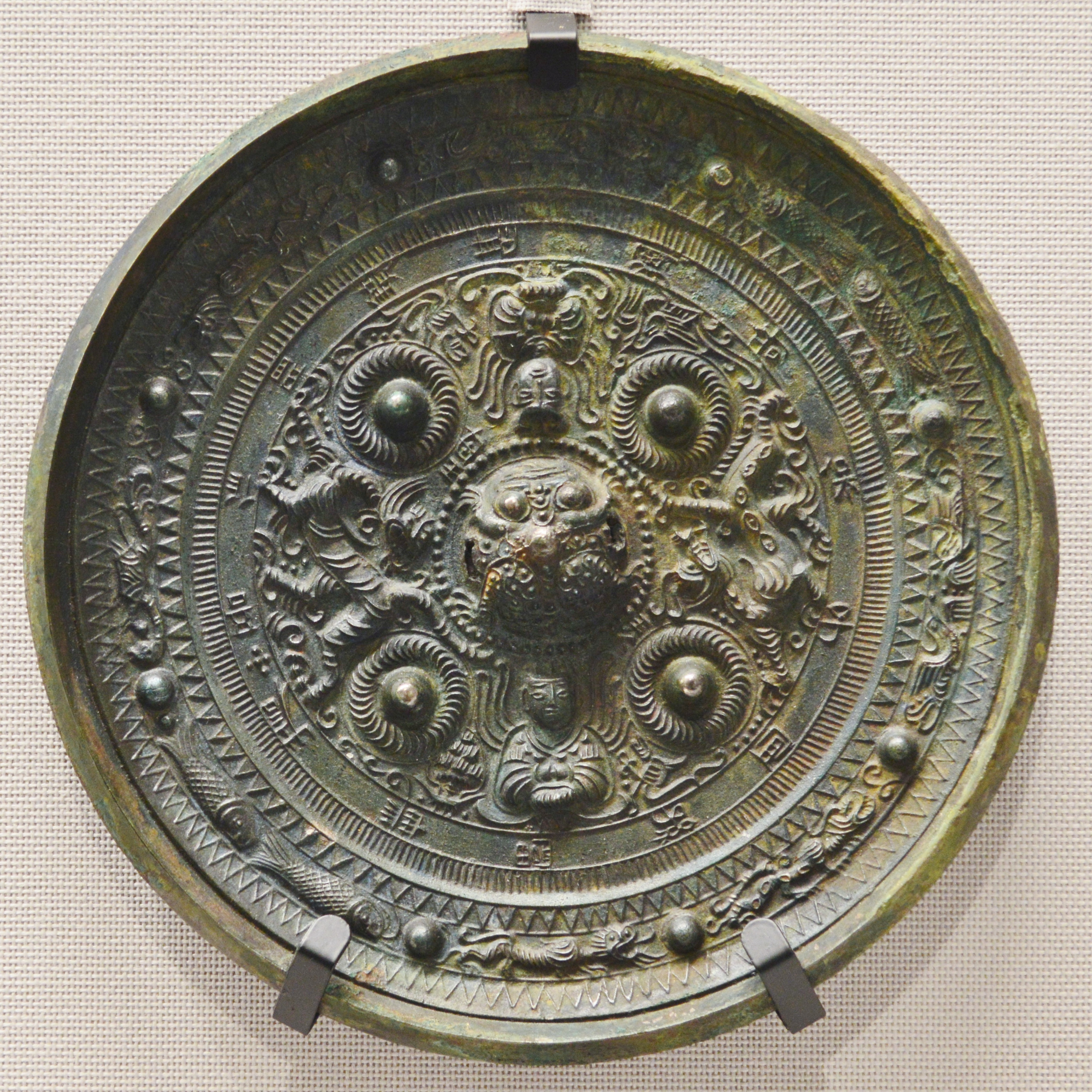
bronze mirror from the Shorinzan Kofun

Mikuriyama Kofun group
Name	Location	Coordinates	Type	Size	Artifacts	Date	Notes
Covered by National Historic Site designation
Shorinzan Kofun	Shingai	34°43′10.48″N 137°53′16.70″E	keyhole	length = 107m	bronze mirrors, weapons, beads, haniwa	late 4th century	Excavated 1931
Inariyama Kofun	Shingai	34°43′22.55″N 137°53′23.23″E	keyhole	length = 48m	pottery	late 4th century	Excavated 1997–1998
Akihayama Kofun	Shingai	34°43′20.80″N 137°53′23.20″E	Circular	dia = 54m	pottery	late 4th century	Excavated 1997–1998
Takaneyama Kofun	Kamata	34°43′8.30″N 137°53′20.80″E	Circular	dia = 52m	haniwa	4th century	Excavated 1997–1998
Mikuridōyama Kofun	Kamata	34°43′1.05″N 137°53′27.85″E	keyhole	length = 50m	weapons	5th century	early 20th century
Others
Kyozuka Kofun	Shingai	34°43′18.30″N 137°53′25.30″E	keyhole	length = 90m	bronze mirror	early 4th century	excavated 1985–1886; destroyed by railway construction
Shingai No.17 Kofun (Renjoji No.5 Kofun)	Shingai	34°43′24.12″N 137°53′20.93″E	circular	diameter = 30m	bronze mirror	early 5th century	now destroyed
Mekakuyama Kofun	Kamata	34°42′55.52″N 137°53′26.38″E	Circular	35 x 33m		5th century	

== See also ==
- List of Historic Sites of Japan (Shizuoka)
