= CA30 =

CA30 or CA-30 may refer to:

- California's 30th congressional district
- California State Route 30
- CAC CA-30, an Australian variant of the Aermacchi MB-326 light military jet trainer
- Jiefang CA-30, a Chinese military truck based on the ZIL-157
- USS Houston (CA-30), a United States Navy heavy cruiser
- Mikuriya Station (Shizuoka), a railway station in Iwata, Japan (station code: CA30)
