= Ganyu dialect =

Mandarin Chinese dialect of Jiangsu, China

Ganyu Dialect
- 赣榆方言
- Region: Lianyungang, China
- Language family: Sino-Tibetan: Sinitic; Mandarin Chinese; Zhongyuan Mandarin; Ganyu Dialect
- Writing system: Chinese characters

Language codes
- ISO 639-3: –

The Ganyu dialect (simplified Chinese: 赣榆话; traditional Chinese: 赣榆話; pinyin: Gànyúhuà) is a dialect of Mandarin Chinese. It is spoken in Ganyu District and Donghai County, in Jiangsu province of China.

According to the Language Atlas of China, the Ganyu dialect is a kind of Zhongyuan Mandarin, but this is disputed. Some linguists regard it as one of Central Plains Mandarin like the Xuzhou dialect because of a similar evolution of the entering tone in ancient Chinese with Central Plains Mandarin. However, some linguists think of it as a kind of Jiaoliao Mandarin because of same initial consonant system. In fact, the Ganyu dialect shares more common vocabulary with Jiaoliao Mandarin. It is a little difficult for one whose mother tongue is Central Plains Mandarin to understand Ganyu Dialect.

While there are differences in how the Ganyu dialect is spoken, all forms of it are mutually intelligible. The accent of someone from northwestern Ganyu sounds more like the one of someone who was born and grew up in the neighboring area of Shandong Province.

Linguistics have noted that the Ganyu dialect often weakens certain syllables and loses certain syllables all together in certain compound words and phrases. A few common examples of the difference between Standard Mandarin and the Ganyu dialect are that 百 or 白 are pronounced "bei" instead of "bai". Another example is the use of the word 肉, pronounced as "you" instead of "rou".
