= Fukuroi Station =

Railway station in Fukuroi, Shizuoka Prefecture, Japan

CA29 Fukuroi Station 袋井駅
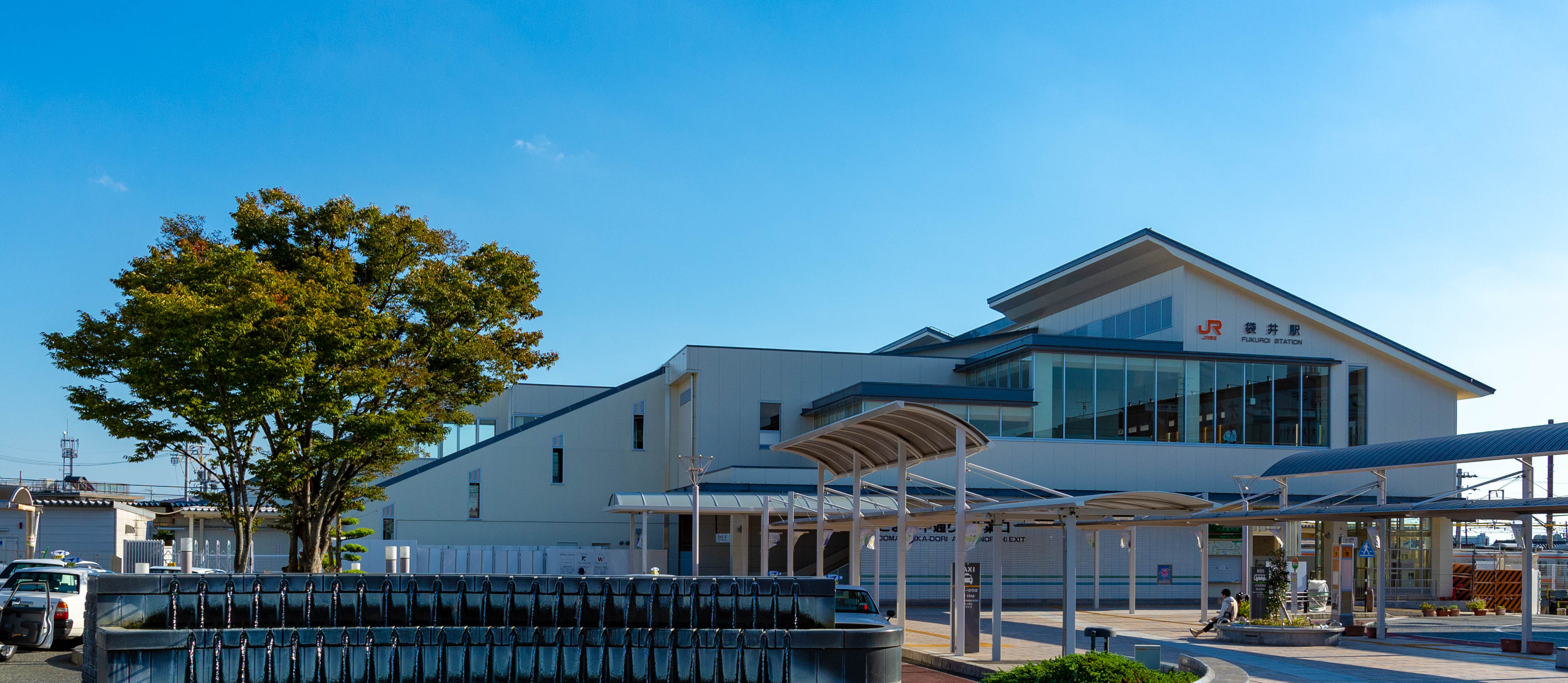
- JR Fukuroi Station in 2015

General information
- Location: 2025-5 Takao, Fukuroi-shi, Shizuoka-ken; Japan
- Coordinates: 34°44′29.5″N 137°55′33″E
- Operator: JR Central
- Line: Tokaido Main Line
- Distance: 238.1 kilometers from Tokyo
- Platforms: 2 island platforms

Other information
- Status: Staffed ("Midori no Madoguchi")

History
- Opened: April 16, 1889

Passengers
- 2023–2024: 9,308 daily
Location
- Location within Shizuoka Prefecture Location within Japan

Fukuroi Station (袋井駅, Fukuroi-eki) is a railway station on the Tōkaidō Main Line of Central Japan Railway Company (JR Tōkai) in the city of Fukuroi, Shizuoka Prefecture, Japan.

== Lines ==
Fukuroi Station is served by the JR Tōkai Tōkaidō Main Line, and is located 238.1 kilometers from the official starting point of the line at Tokyo.

== Station layout ==
Fukuroi Station has two island platforms, connected by a footbridge with an elevated station building above the tracks. The outside tracks, Track 1 and Track 4, are not in regular use, except during peak times in the summer festival season. The station building has automated ticket machines, TOICA automated turnstiles and a staffed "Midori no Madoguchi" service counter.

=== Platforms ===
1	■ Tōkaidō Main Line	auxiliary platform
2	■ Tōkaidō Main Line	For Kakegawa, Shizuoka
3	■ Tōkaidō Main Line	For Hamamatsu, Toyohashi
4	■ Tōkaidō Main Line	auxiliary platform

== Layout ==
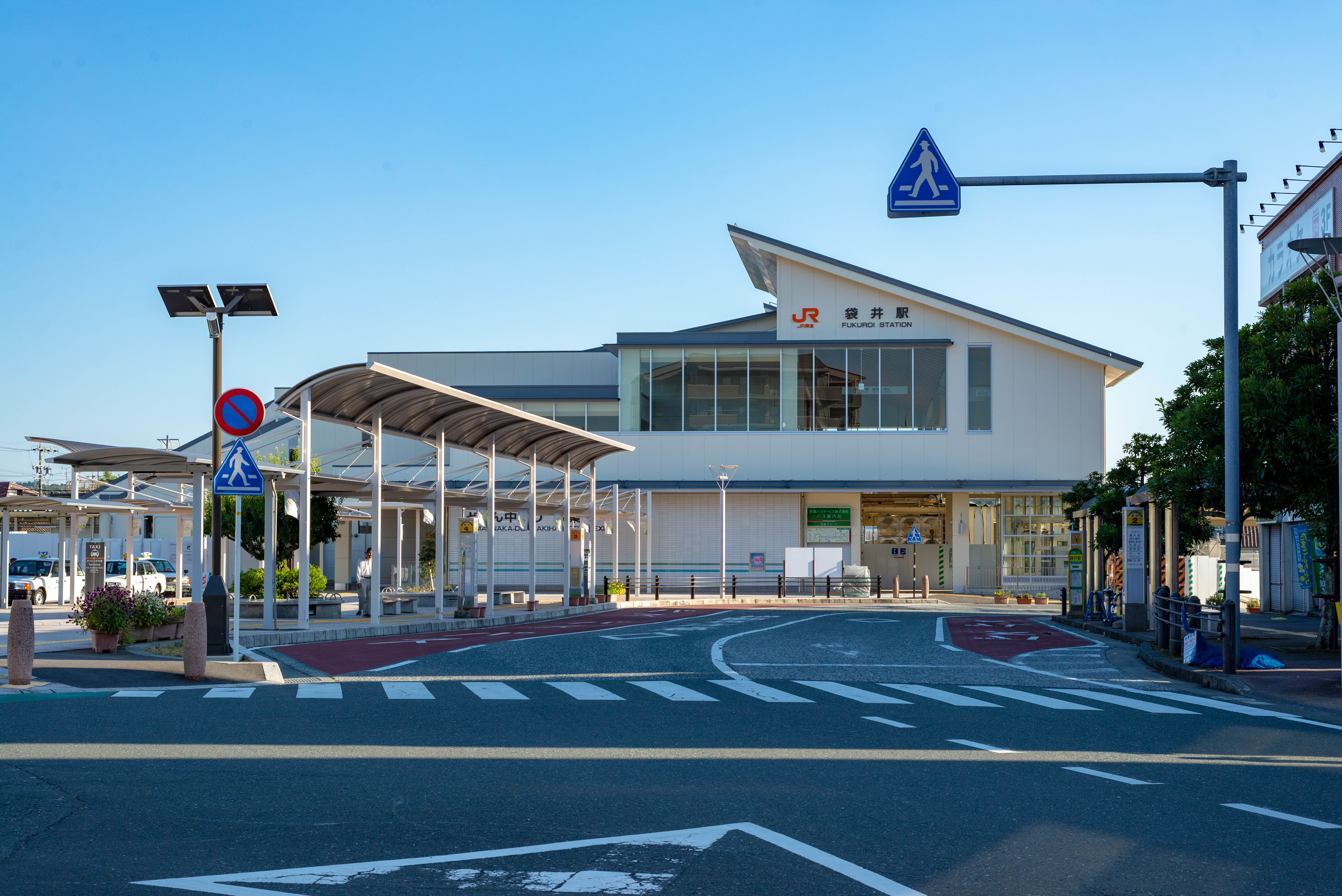
Station Building

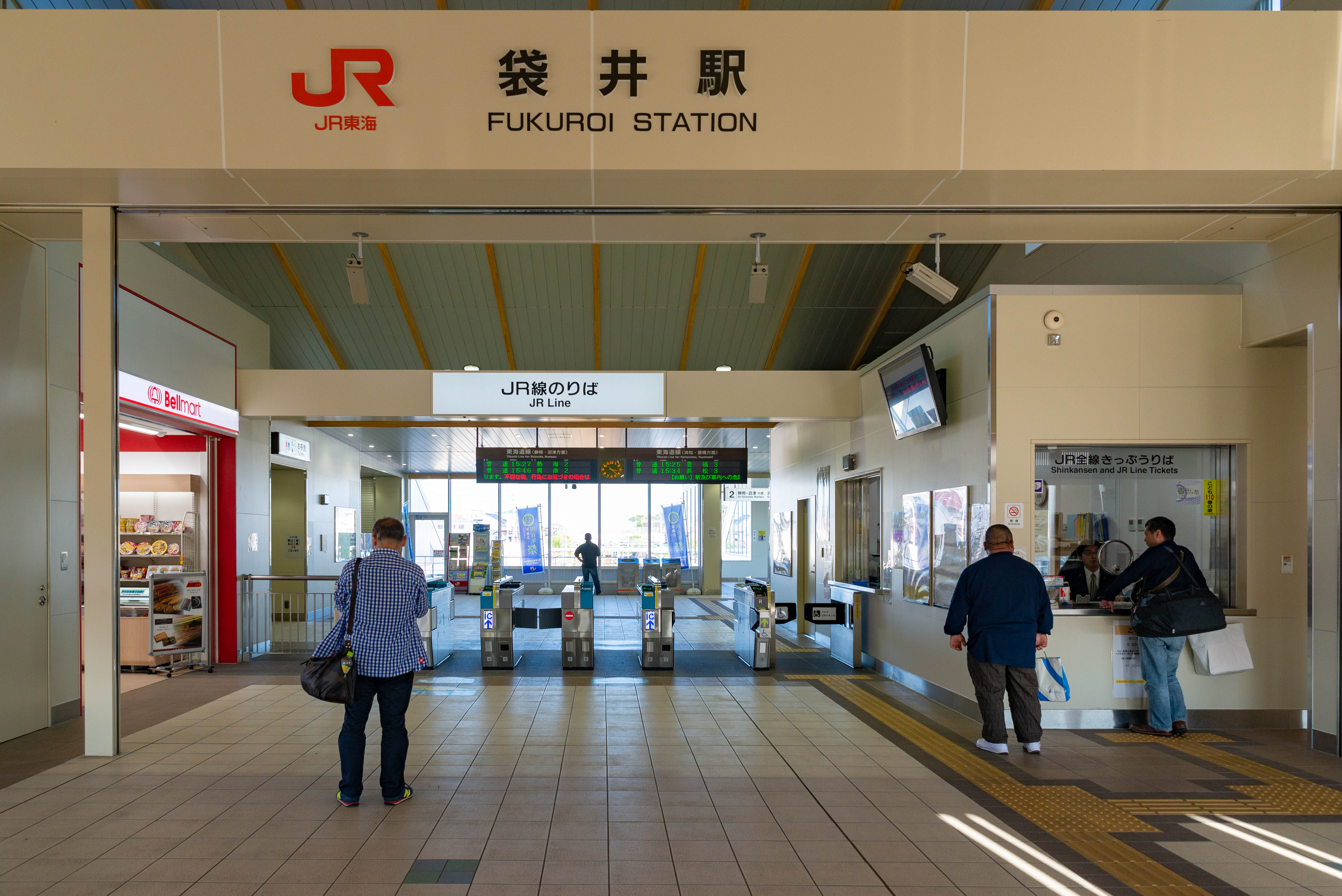
Ticket gate

== Adjacent stations ==
«	Service	»
Tōkaidō Main Line
Kakegawa	Home Liner	Iwata
Aino	Local	Mikuriya

== History ==
Fukuroi Station was opened on April 16, 1889 when the section of the Tōkaidō Main Line connecting Shizuoka with Hamamatsu was completed. From 1902-1962, it was an interchange station which also served the Akiha Line of the Shizuoka Railway. Regularly scheduled freight service was discontinued on January 21, 1984.

Station numbering was introduced to the section of the Tōkaidō Line operated JR Central in March 2018; Fukuroi Station was assigned station number CA29.

== Passenger statistics ==
In fiscal 2017, the station was used by an average of 5324 passengers daily (boarding passengers only).

== Surrounding area ==
- Fukuroi City Hall

== See also ==
- List of Railway Stations in Japan
