= Banzhuang =

Banzhuang 班庄/班莊
- Town
- Nickname: Stone Town
- Location in Jiangsu Banzhuang (China)
- Coordinates: 34.8504°N 118.851°E
- Country: China
- Province: Jiangsu
- Prefecture-level city: Lianyungang
- County: Ganyu

Area
  - Total: 175.61 km^{2} (67.80 sq mi)

Population
  - Total: 100,000
  - Density: 570/km^{2} (1,500/sq mi)

Banzhuang (simplified Chinese: 班庄; traditional Chinese: 班莊; pinyin: Bānzhuāng) is a town in Ganyu District, Lianyungang, in the north of Jiangsu province of China, adjacent to Linyi of Shandong Province. As of 2013, Banzhuang Town has a total area of 175.61 square kilometres (67.80 mi^{2}), and a population of about 100,000.

== History ==
Archeological artifacts found in the west of the town provide evidence that the area was part of the ancient Zhuqi Kingdom for thousands of years before Zhuqi became a vassal state of the Zhou dynasty. During the earlier Spring and Autumn period, Lu expanded to the west of Zhuqi up to the Banzhuang area.

From the Qin to the Sui dynasty periods, Banzhuang was part of Zhuqi. The Zhuqi County seat was situated to the east of Gucheng, a big village to the west of Banzhuang. Following the Tang dynasty overthrow of the Sui dynasty, Zhuqi County was combined into Huairen County in the year 623. Banzhuang has continued to exist administratively as part of the western part of Ganyu (i.e. Huairen) County to the present day.

At the end of the Qing dynasty, reforms were made to the local government system granting greater local autonomy. As part of these reforms, Jiagu City was founded near Guangxiao Town (光孝乡) in Ganyu County. Jiagu City was an amalgamation of four towns: Menlouhe Town, Xingning Town, Banlizhuang Town, and Huandun Town. The city government was based in Huandun Town.

After the national government in Nanjing overthrew the Beiyang authorities in Peking, it began to make further reforms to the local and central administrative system. Ganyu became a county of the 8th Administrative District (also called Donghai Administrative District) of Jiangsu Province. Jiagu City became the 4th district of Ganyu County.

When the Japanese invaded and occupied Ganyu County, the local government was dismissed, and a new, pro-Japanese government was established. When the Chinese Communist Party (CCP) took the area from Japanese forces during the Second Sino-Japanese War, they set up a new administrative system. The fourth district of Ganyu County was divided further into smaller districts: Zhumeng District in the south and Guyang District in the north. In 1951, Guyang District was the 7th District of Ganyu County, covering 11 towns; Zhumeng District was the 9th District of Ganyu County, covering 9 towns.

During the Chinese Civil War between the CCP and Kuomintang, the CCP controlled all of Ganyu County. Zhumeng District broke away from Ganyu County for several months in 1947.

After the CCP occupied Nanjing, the capital of China at the time, Jiangsu Province was abolished and split up. Ganyu County was combined into Shandong Province up until Jiangsu Province was restored in 1953. In this same year, the 9th District of Ganyu County was abolished and combined into the 7th District of the county.

In 1955, the 7th District of Ganyu County was called Jiagushan District. In May 1958, Jiagushan District was divided into two towns: Jiagushan Town and Huandun Town. When the Campaign of People's Commune began, the two towns' names were changed to Jiagushan People's Commune and Huandun People's Commune, respectively.

In 1958, construction of Shilianghe Reservoir began, triggering migrations out of the Banzhuang area. However, these migrations were poorly organized; many arrived at their new homes and found nothing prepared. The government did not reimburse migrants for losses related to their displacement until 50 years later. Some migrants eventually returned to their homes in the area.

In 1961, Jiagushan People's Commune was divided into Banzhuang People's Commune and Jiashan People's Commune.

In 1983, the People's Commune was abolished in Jiangsu Province. Huandun People's Commune was restored to its old name of Huandun Township; Banzhuang People's Commune was renamed Banzhuang Township, and Jiashan People's Commune became Jiashan Township. In 1985, Huandun Township became Huandun Town, while Banzhuang Township became a town in 2000.

In 2001, Banzhuang Town and Jiashan Township were united into Banzhuang Town.

On January 31, 2013, Jiangsu's provincial government decreed the merger of Huandun Township into Banzhuang Town.

== Geography ==
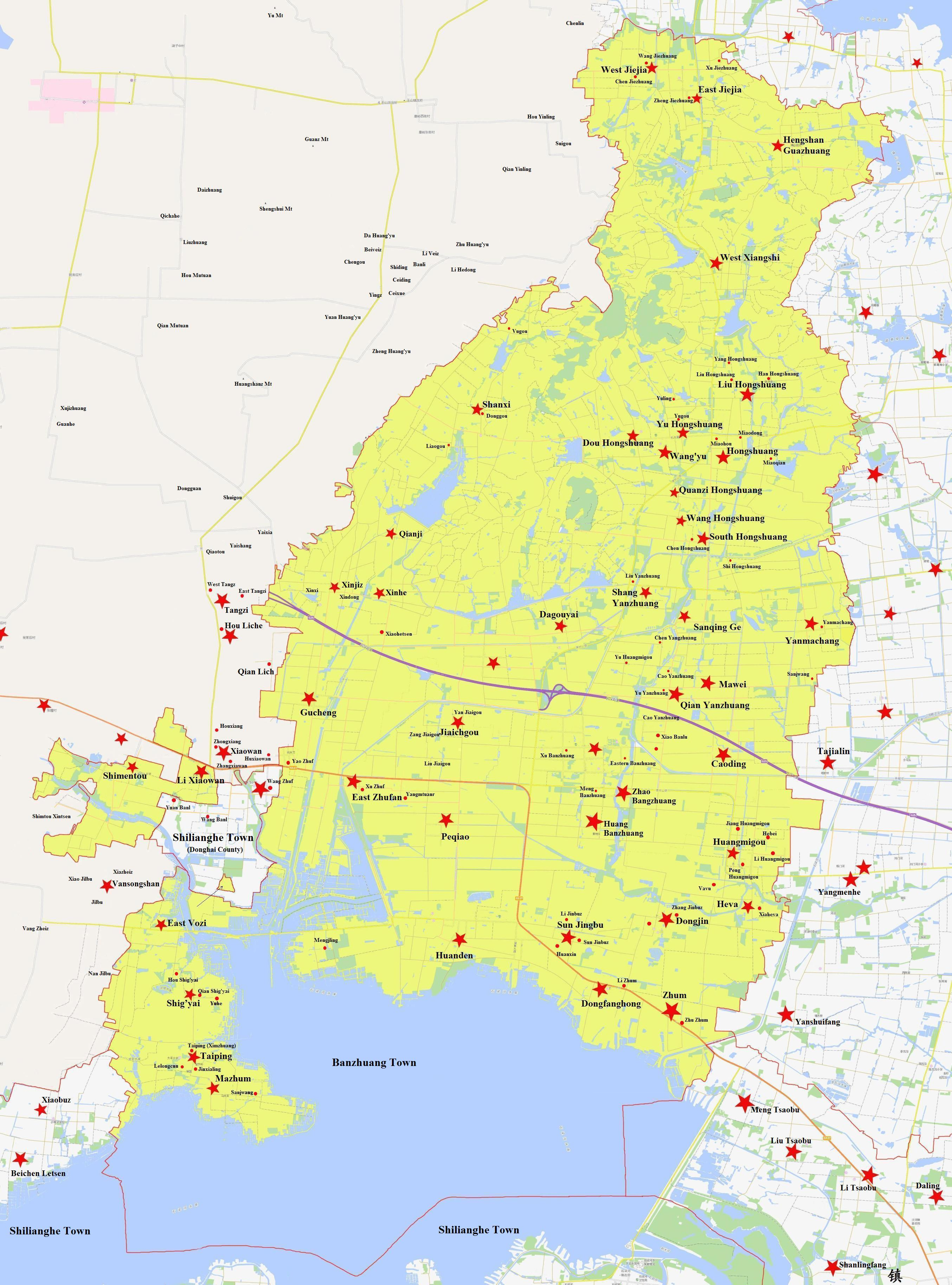
Map of Banzhuang

Banzhuang is the largest town in Ganyu County, covering an area of 175.61 square kilometers.

The north part of the town is characterized by low hills. Many of the low mountains have local names: Taipin, Langtou, Zhuqi, Jiagu, Hulu, Jinniu, Shuang, Ma (Horse), Liao, Ma'an (Anti-Japan), Liujia, Gejia, Heng, Zhuque. The south part of the town features fertile plains and constitutes the main farming area of Banzhuang Town.

Rice, wheat, corn, peanut, and soy are the staple crops grown in the area. In the northern hilly areas, fruit and tea trees are very common. Other common crops include mung and adzuki.

There are some small rivers which run through the town. Starting in 1949, some small canals were dug for the purpose of irrigation and for connecting Shilianghe Reservoir and Tashan Reservoir. There are no large natural lakes, only man-made reservoirs, such as Shilianghe Reservoir, Honglingjin Reservoir, and Sanba Reservoir.

Shilianghe Reservoir is the largest man-made lake in the town, and in Jiangsu Province. It was dug in 1958 and finished in 1960s. The reservoir is fed by the New Shoo, Zhufan, and Tangz Rivers. A 1st-grade flood trench links Shilianghe Reservoir and Tashan Reservoir.

== Government and politics ==
=== Administrative divisions ===
Banzhuang is divided into 44 administrative villages (Chinese: 行政村). There are also natural villages (Chinese: 自然村), which do not act as administrative divisions.

The town's administrative villages are listed as follows:

Administrative Villages of Banzhuang Town
English name	Chinese	Pinyin	Local Dialect	Villager's Group	Households	Population	Farmable Land	Natural Villages
Banzhuang	班庄	bān zhuāng	bānzhuāng	9	922	3454	192.76	Banxi (班西), Bandong (班东), Dongbanzhuang (东班庄), Mengbanzhuang (孟班庄)
Caoding	曹顶	cáo dǐng	cáodīng	7	568	2133	1903.90	
Shangyanzhuang	上阎庄	shàng yán zhuāng	shàng-yánzhuāng	3	364	1333	85.18	
Qianyanzhuang	前阎庄	qián yán zhuāng	qiányánzhuāng	6	560	2064	166.35	Heyanzhuang (贺闫庄), Yuyanzhuang (于闫庄), Chenyanzhuang (陈闫庄), Liuyanzhuang (刘闫庄)
Xinji	新集	xīn jí	xīnjiz	4	726	2553	161.55	
Gucheng	古城	gǔ chéng	gǔch	14	1342	5706	273.47	
Zhaobanzhuang	赵班庄	zhào bān zhuāng	zhào bānzhuāng	4	336	1234	100.12	
Huangbanzhuang	黄班庄	huáng bān zhuāng	huáng bānzhuāng	2	286	1103	66.7	
Sanqingge	三清阁	sān qīng gé	sānqīnggé	3	291	992	81.44	
Mawei	马圩	mǎ wéi	māvéi	3	268	1082	79.51	
Yanmachang	演马场	yǎn mǎ chǎng	yánmǎchang	4	366	1292	113.33	Yanmachang (演马场), Sanjiaozhuang (三角庄)
Dagou'ai	大沟埃	dà gōu ái	dàg'yái	4	482	2003	108.72	
Quanzipo	泉子坡	quán zi pō	quánzpō	5	532	1939	142.67	
Xinhedong	新河东	xīn hé dōng	xīnhe	3	256	960	61.50	Xiaohecun (小河村), Xinhedong (新河东)
Qianji	前集	qián jí	qiánji	2	180	570	37.69	
Wangyu	汪于	wāng yǘ	Vāng'yǘ	4	442	1508	65.72	
Xixiangshi	西响石	xī xiǎng shí	Xīxǎngshí	5	511	2052	121.39	
Hengshanguanzhuang	横山官庄	hèng shān guān zhuāng	héngshānguāngzhuāng	4	493	1911	197.83	
Shanxi	山西	shān xī	shānxi	6	528	2470	185.00	Vugou (吴沟), Donggou (董沟), Liaogou (廖沟)
Liuhongshuang	刘洪爽	liú hóng shuǎng	Liú Hóngshui	4	651	2106	126.20	Yanghongshuang (杨洪爽), Liuhongshuang (刘洪爽), Hanhongshuang (韩洪爽)
Hongshuang	洪爽	hóng shuǎng	hóngshui	3	508	1746	105.59	Miaoqian (庙前), Miaohou (庙后), Miaodong (庙东)
Nanhongshuang	南洪爽	nán hóng shuǎng	nánhóngshui	2	295	1086	68.30	Shihongshuang (时洪爽), Chenhongshuang (陈洪爽)
Yuhongshuang	于洪爽	yǘ hóng shuǎng	yǘhóngshui	2	276	1021	51.03	Yuling (于岭), Yugou (于沟), Yuhongshuang (于洪爽)
Wanghongshuang	王洪爽	wáng hóng shuǎng	vánghóngshui	3	263	843	73.50	
Quangzihongshuang	圈子洪爽	quān zi hóng shuǎng	quānzhóngshui	3	272	896	92.05	
Douhongshuang	窦洪爽	dǒu hóng shuǎng	dòuhóngshui	5	581	2369	96.05	
Xijiejia	西接驾	xī jiē jià	xījiējiā	4	612	2024	137.74	Chenjiezhuang (陈接庄), Vangjiezhuang (王接庄)
Dongjiejia	东接驾	dong jie jia	dōngjiējià	4	499	1690	87.58	Zhengjiezhuang (郑接庄), Xujiezhuang (徐接庄)
Huandunbu	欢墩埠	huān dūn bù	Huāndēn	13	1492	5718	257.00	Huanxi (欢西), Huandong (欢东), Huanxin (欢新, old name: Fanjingbuz (范净埠))
Hewa	河洼	hé wà	hévà	4	297	1153	88.73	Xiaoheva (小河洼), Vavu (瓦屋)
Huangnigou	黄泥沟	huáng ní gōu	Huángmígōu	7	642	2399	130.47	Penghuangmigou (彭黄泥沟), Jianghuangmigou (蒋黄泥沟), Leehuangmigou (李黄泥沟), Hebei (河北)
Jiegou	介沟	jiè gōu	Jiàichgōu	8	757	2732	162.33	Liujiaigou (刘介沟), Zangjiaigou (臧介沟), Yanjiaigou (阎介沟)
Shimentou	石门头	shí mén tóu	shímtou	13	659	2710	145.53	Yicun (一村), Lercun (二村), Sancun (三村), Sicun (四村)
Taiping	太平	tài píng	tàipīng	6	730	2718	66.47	Taipingcun (太平村, old name: Ximzhuang (西孟庄)), Sanjvang (三角汪), Aiguo(爱国), Jinxialing (金下岭, old name: Zhuchavang(朱岔汪)), Lelongcun (二龙村)
Zhufan	朱范	zhū fàn	dōngzhūf	10	748	2836	121.13	Xuzhuf (徐朱范), Yaozhuf (姚朱范), Yangmtuair (演马团)
Zhumeng	朱孟	zhū mèng	Jūm	4	271		45.27	Zhuzhum (朱朱孟), Leezhum (李朱孟)
Dongfanghong	东方红	dōng fāng hóng	dōngfānghóng	4	443	1550	54.07	Dongfanghong (东方红, old name: Xuezhum (薛朱孟))
Sunjingbu	孙净埠	sūn jìng bù	sēnjìngbùz	7	534	2143	138.80	Senjingbuz (孙净埠), Leejingbuz (李净埠)
Dongjingbu	董净埠	dǒng jìng bù	dōngjìn	10	857	2989	193.40	Dongjingbuz (董净埠), Zhangjingbuz (张净埠)
Lixiaowan	李小湾	lǐ xiǎo wān	lixiǎovāi	2	155	575	27.73	
Dongwozi	东窝子	dōng wō zi	dōngvōzi	4	417	1695	45.47	
Shigou'ai	石沟埃	shí gōu ái	shíg'yai	4	371	1451	41.27	Yuhecun (玉河村), Qianshig'yai (前石沟埃), Houshig'yai (后石沟埃)
Poqiao	坡桥	pō qiáo	pōqiao	4	498	1889	157.07	
Mazhumeng	马朱孟	mǎ zhū mèng	Mā Zhūm	5	367	1254	12.00	
