= Shizuoka Stadium =

Japanese football stadium in Shizuoka Prefecture

Shizuoka Stadium ECOPA 静岡スタジアムエコパ
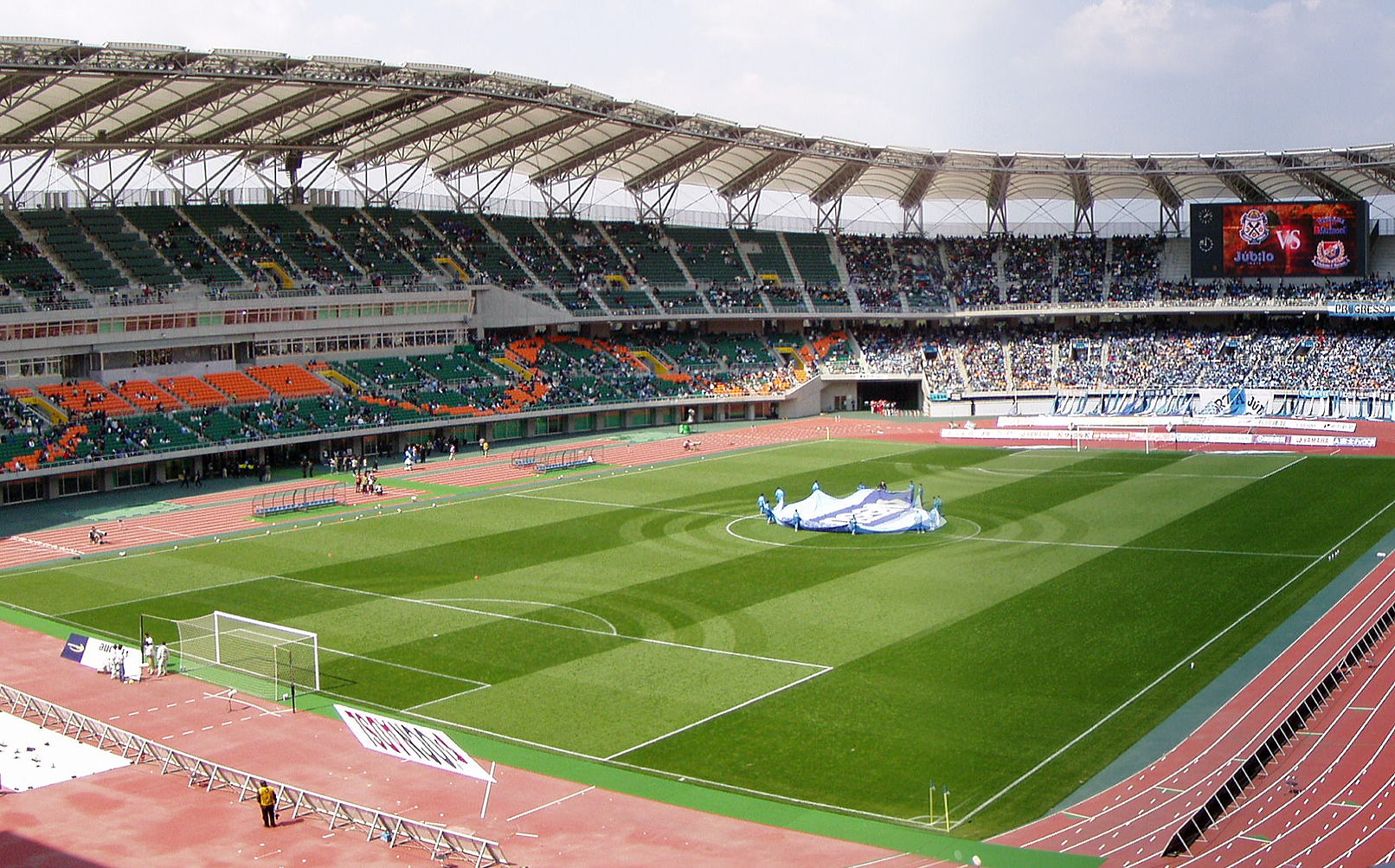
- Interactive map of Shizuoka Stadium ECOPA 静岡スタジアムエコパ
- Location: Fukuroi, Shizuoka, Japan
- Coordinates: 34°44′36″N 137°58′14″E
- Owner: Shizuoka Prefecture
- Operator: Shizuoka Prefectural Football Association
- Capacity: 50,889
- Surface: Grass
- Field size: 106 by 72 metres (116 by 79 yards)
- Public transit: JR Central: Tōkaidō Main Line at Aino

Construction
- Opened: March 2001

Tenants
- Júbilo Iwata; Shimizu S-Pulse (selected matches)

Shizuoka Stadium ECOPA (静岡スタジアム・エコパ, Shizuoka Sutajiamu Ekopa) is a sports stadium located in Fukuroi City, Shizuoka Prefecture, although the stadium itself is merely the centrepiece of the larger Ogasayama Sports Park which extends into neighbouring Kakegawa. It is used primarily for football. The stadium's capacity is 50,889. It is now the primary venue for major sporting events in Shizuoka Prefecture, including track and field, for which it is fully equipped.

== Usage ==
Shizuoka Stadium opened in 2001 and hosted its first major event on May 12, 2001, which was the Shizuoka derby J. League match between Shimizu S-Pulse and Júbilo Iwata. A record crowd of 52,959 saw an extra time 1-0 victory for Shimizu.

Ecopa continues to be the venue for Júbilo Iwata's more high-profile games, including the Shizuoka derby. Shimizu S-Pulse have not used the stadium for a home league since 2015.

In recent years Ecopa has also been home to one semifinal match of the Emperor's Cup, sharing the duty with the Kokuritsu in Shinjuku, Tokyo. But, due to its isolation and the fact that both semifinals are held at the same time, Ecopa usually has less attendance.

The stadium played host to some matches during the 2002 FIFA World Cup, including Belgium versus Russia in the group stage (which Belgium won 3–2) and the quarter-final match between Brazil and England, which Brazil won 2–1.

It hosted the 2003 58th National Sports Festival of Japan main stadium.

The stadium was used as one of the venues for 2019 Rugby World Cup (Japan) which was the first Rugby World Cup to be held in Asia.

Next to the stadium is the indoor Ecopa Arena which is used for various performances and shows.

== Access ==
Aino Station was constructed at the same time as the stadium and is a fifteen-minute walk from the stadium. Aino Station is four minutes west of Kakegawa Station, the nearest Shinkansen station to Ecopa. When the stadium is used for J. League or international fixtures, shuttle buses run from Kakegawa station to the stadium.

The walk from Aino Station to the stadium is notable for the sixteen works of art which line the route. These were commissioned to commemorate the 2002 World Cup, with each art piece being designed by an artist from a previous host of the competition.

== 2002 FIFA World Cup matches ==
The following matches were played at Shizuoka Stadium during the 2002 World Cup:

Date	Team 1	Res.	Team 2	Round	Attendance
11 June 2002	Cameroon	0–2	Germany	Group E	47,085
14 June 2002	Belgium	3–2	Russia	Group H	46,640
21 June 2002	England	1–2	Brazil	Quarter-finals	47,436

== 2019 Rugby World Cup matches ==
The following matches were played at Shizuoka Stadium during the 2019 Rugby World Cup:

Date	Team 1	Res.	Team 2	Round	Attendance
28 September 2019	Japan	19–12	Ireland	Pool A	47,813
4 October 2019	South Africa	49–3	Italy	Pool B	44,148
9 October 2019	Scotland	61–0	Russia	Pool A	44,123
11 October 2019	Australia	27–8	Georgia	Pool D	39,802

Preceded by Huanglong Sports Center; Hangzhou	Asian Games Women's Football tournament Final Venue; 2026	Succeeded by TBD; TBD
