= Shahe, Jiangsu =

Shahe 沙河镇
- Town
- 沙河镇
- Location within Jiangsu Location within China
- Coordinates: 34°43′26″N 118°56′47″E
- Country: People's Republic of China
- Province: Jiangsu
- Prefecture-level city: Lianyungang
- County: Ganyu

Area
  - Total: 131.56 km^{2} (50.80 sq mi)

Population (2010)
  - Total: 107,756
  - Density: 819.06/km^{2} (2,121.4/sq mi)
- Time zone: UTC+8 (China Standard Time)
- Postal Code: 222100
- Area code: 0518

Shahe (Chinese: 沙河; pinyin: Shāhé) is a town in the southwest of Ganyu County, in the north of Jiangsu province, China. The town comprises 52 administrative villages, has an area of 131.56 square kilometres (50.80 mi^{2}), and has a population of 96,768 as of 2010.

== Administrative divisions ==
As of 2020, Shahe includes the following 52 administrative villages:

- Zhengxiang Village (Chinese: 郑巷村)
- Shuangdui Village (Chinese: 双堆村)
- Zhuwei Village (Chinese: 朱圩村)
- Dagao Village (Chinese: 大高村)
- Tuanjie Village (Chinese: 团结村)
- Jiefang Village (Chinese: 解放村)
- Chengzi Village (Chinese: 城子村)
- Xinjian Village (Chinese: 新建村)
- Youyi Village (Chinese: 友谊村)
- Louhe Village (Chinese: 楼河村)
- Xiyanzhuang Village (Chinese: 西颜庄村)
- Lianhe Village (Chinese: 联合村)
- Liuzhuang Village (Chinese: 刘庄村)
- Hengjie Village (Chinese: 横街村)
- Xibei Village (Chinese: 西北村)
- Xiahekou Village (Chinese: 下河口村)
- Xinzhuang Village (Chinese: 新庄村)
- Balichang Village (Chinese: 八里场村)
- Guanzhuang Village (Chinese: 官庄村)
- Wucun Village (Chinese: 吴村村)
- Zhulin Village (Chinese: 竹林村)
- Heyuan Village (Chinese: 何园村)
- Jiangzhai Village (Chinese: 蒋宅村)
- Dingxiang Village (Chinese: 丁巷村)
- Chenxiang Village (Chinese: 陈巷村)
- Xutun Village (Chinese: 徐屯村)
- Dazhan Village (Chinese: 大站村)
- Chijin Village (Chinese: 赤金村)
- Zhutun Village (Chinese: 朱屯村)
- Xiaozhan Village (Chinese: 小站村)
- Beizhuguo Village (Chinese: 北朱果村)
- Xiaobu Village (Chinese: 小埠村)
- Daling Village (Chinese: 大岭村)
- Mengcaobu Village (Chinese: 孟曹埠村)
- Liucaobu Village (Chinese: 刘曹埠村)
- Licaobu Village (Chinese: 李曹埠村)
- Shanlingfang Village (Chinese: 山岭房村)
- Zhangzhuang Village (Chinese: 张庄村)
- Yinzhuang Village (Chinese: 殷庄村)
- Weihe Village (Chinese: 圩合村)
- Xinxing Village (Chinese: 新兴村)
- Dongsheng Village (Chinese: 东盛村)
- Fuqiang Village (Chinese: 富强村)
- Heping Village (Chinese: 和平村)
- Tongxing Village (Chinese: 同兴村)
- Xinhe Village (Chinese: 新合村)
- Taihe Village (Chinese: 泰和村)
- Xisheng Village (Chinese: 西胜村)
- Qianjin Village (Chinese: 前进村)
- Dengzhai Village (Chinese: 邓宅村)
- Dongdan Village (Chinese: 东单村)
- Liuwei Village (Chinese: 刘圩村)

== Demographics ==
Historical population
Year	Pop.	±% p.a.
2000	55,229	—
2004	114,645	+20.03%
2006	107,756	−3.05%
2010	96,768	−2.65%

According to the 2010 Chinese Census, Shahe has a population of 96,768, up from the 55,229 recorded in the 2000 Chinese Census.
