= Ainur =

Ainur may refer to:

- Ainur, a given name in several languages, such as Arabic, Kazakh, Kyrgyz and Albanian. The Turkish version of it is Aynur. It means "moonlight"
- AINUR (Atlas of Images of Nuclear Rings), catalogue of star-forming ring-shaped regions that circle certain galactic nuclei
- Ainur in Middle-earth, spirits in J. R. R. Tolkien's legendarium
- Ainu people, of Japan and the Russian Far East

== See also ==
- Ainu (disambiguation)
