= Aynur =

- Gender: Unisex
- Language: Turkish, Azerbaijani

Origin
- Origin: Arabic or Greenlandic (unrelated)

Other names
- Alternative spelling: Ainur

Aynur is a Turkish and Azerbaijani given name for females. As it is derived from the Turkish word "ay" and the Arabic word "nur", its literal meaning is moonlight.

In the Balkans, Aynur (written as Ajnur) is popular among Bosniaks in the former Yugoslav nations, specifically Bosniak males. This is one of the most popular names in Bosnia and Herzegovina.

== Given name ==
- Aynur Aydın (born 1985), Turkish German singer
- Aynur Doğan (born 1975), Kurdish singer and musician
- Aynur Erge (born 1998), Turkish wrestler
- Aynur Imanova (born 1988), Azerbaijani volleyball player
- Aynur Mustafayeva (born 1998), Azerbaijani rhythmic gymnast
- Aynur Sofiyeva (born 1970), Azerbaijani politician and former chess player
- Ainur Yesbergenova (born 1998), Kazakhstani taekwondo athlete

== See also ==
- Ainur (disambiguation)
  - Ainur Yesbergenova
