= Iwata Station (Shizuoka) =

Railway station in Iwata, Shizuoka Prefecture, Japan

CA31 Iwata Station 磐田駅
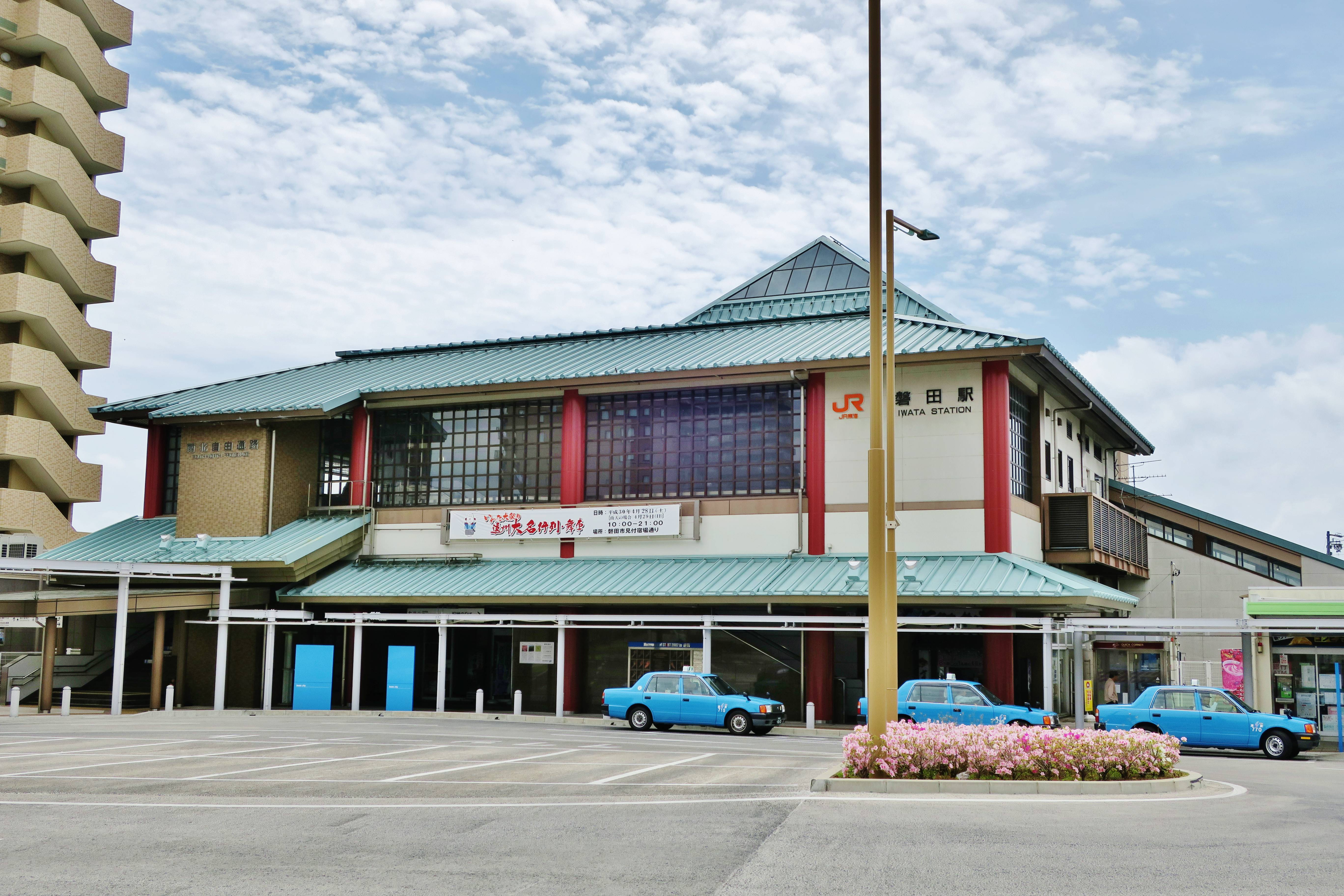
- JR Iwata Station in April 2018

General information
- Location: 633-1 Nakaizumi, Iwata-shi, Shizuoka-ken; Japan
- Coordinates: 34°42′37″N 137°51′07″E
- Operator: JR Central; JR Freight
- Line: Tokaido Main Line
- Distance: 245.9 kilometers from Tokyo
- Platforms: 1 side + 1 island platform

Other information
- Status: Staffed
- Station code: CA31
- Website: Official website

History
- Former names: Nakaizumi (to 1942)

Passengers
- 2023–2024: 11,464 daily
Location
- Location within Shizuoka Prefecture Location within Japan

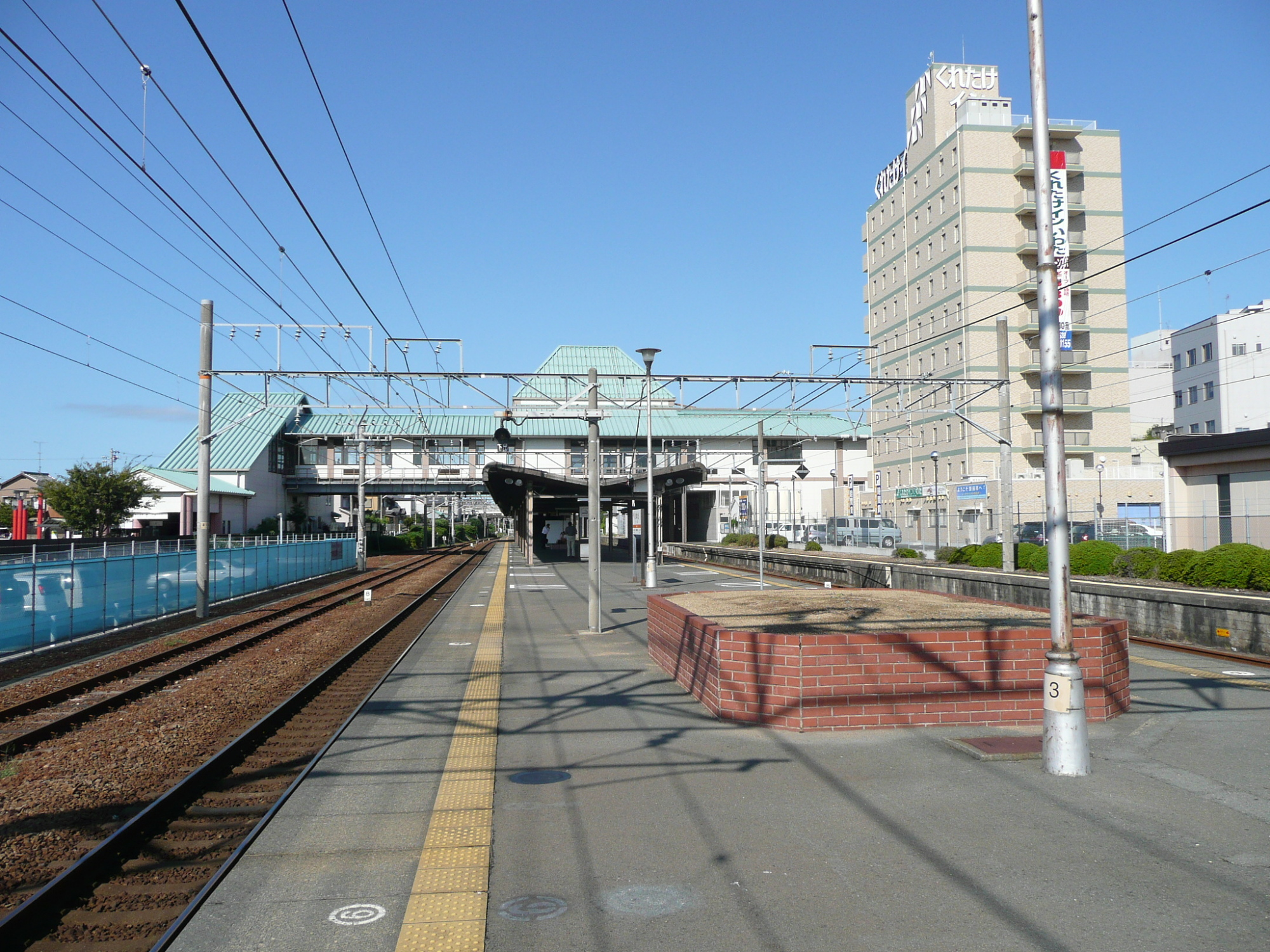
Platform

Iwata Station (磐田駅, Iwata-eki) is a railway station in the city of Iwata, Shizuoka, Japan, operated by Central Japan Railway Company (JR Tōkai). It is also a freight depot for the Japan Freight Railway Company (JR Freight).

== Lines ==
Iwata Station is served by the Tōkaidō Main Line, and is located 245.9 kilometers from the starting point of the line at Tokyo Station.

== Station layout ==
The station has a side platform serving Track 1, which is an infrequently used auxiliary platform, and an island platform serving Track 2 and Track 3. The two platforms are connected by a footbridge. The station building has automated ticket machines, TOICA automated turnstiles and a staffed ticket office.

=== Platforms ===
1	■ Tōkaidō Main Line	auxiliary platform
2	■ Tōkaidō Main Line	For Shizuoka, Numazu
3	■ Tōkaidō Main Line	For Hamamatsu, Toyohashi

== Adjacent stations ==
«	Service	»
Central Japan Railway Company
Tōkaidō Main Line
Fukuroi	Home Liner	Hamamatsu
Mikuriya	Local	Toyodachō

== History ==
Iwata Station was built as Nakaizumi Station (中泉駅, Nakaizumi-eki) on April 16, 1889, when the section of the Tōkaidō Main Line connecting Shizuoka with Hamamatsu was completed. It was renamed “Iwata Station” on October 10, 1942. The station building was rebuilt in 1915, 1957, and 2000. Regularly scheduled freight service was discontinued on February 26, 1996; however, occasional freight trains operated by the Japan Freight Railway Company stopped at a rail siding at Iwata to service the industrial zone to the east of the station.

A large bus terminal was established at the south exit of the station in 2006.

A statue of the local football club Júbilo Iwata's mascot, Júbilo-kun, modeled on the black-tailed flycatcher, stands prominently in front of the station's north exit. Buses at the stop nearby provide service to the club's stadium, Yamaha Stadium, on game days.

Station numbering was introduced to the section of the Tōkaidō Line operated JR Central in March 2018; Iwata Station was assigned station number CA31.

== Passenger statistics ==
In fiscal 2017, the station was used by an average of 8175 passengers daily (boarding passengers only).

== Surrounding area ==
- Iwata City Hall

== See also ==
- List of railway stations in Japan
