= Ganyu, Lianyungang =

Ganyu 赣榆区 Kanyu
- District
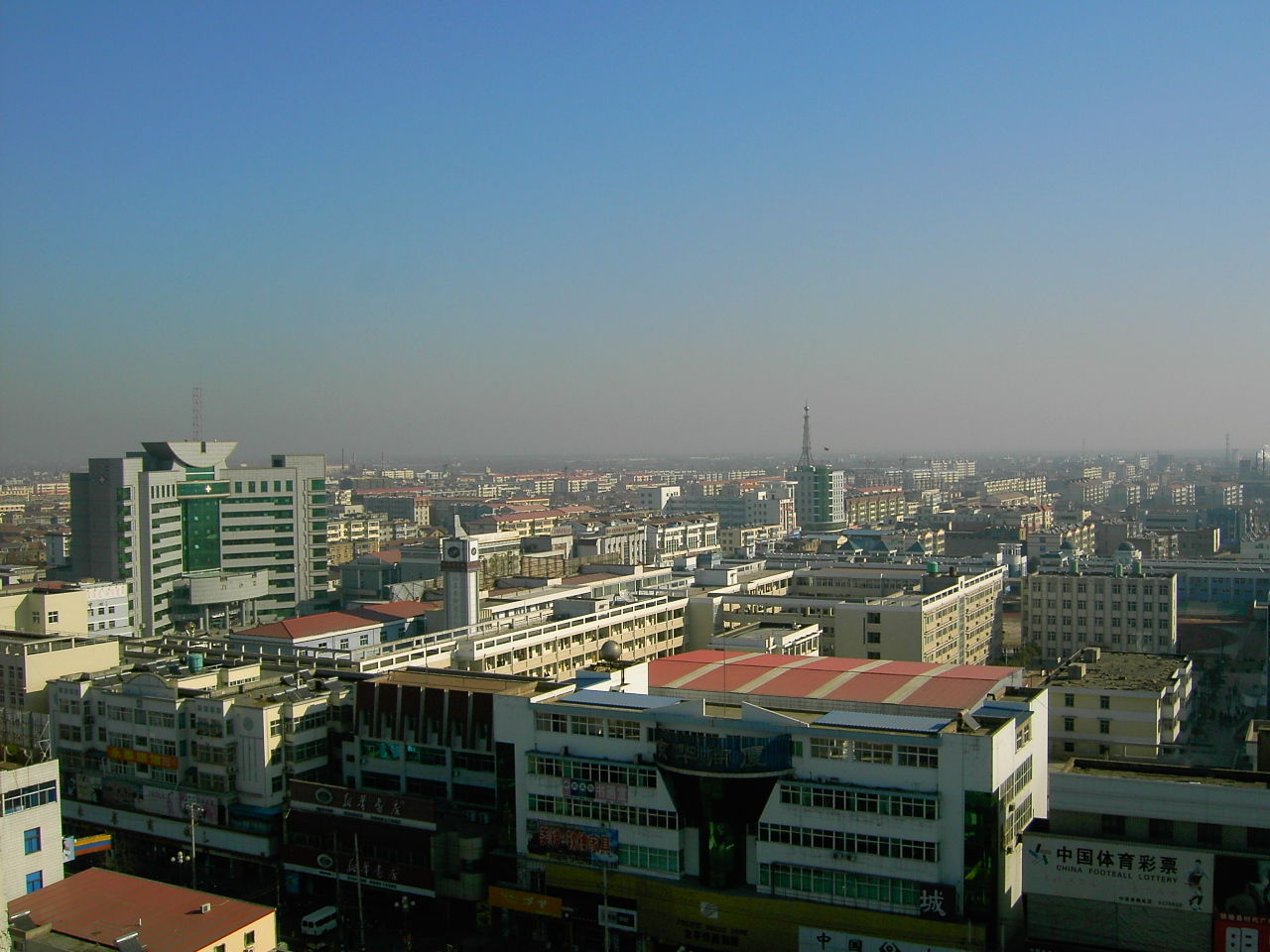

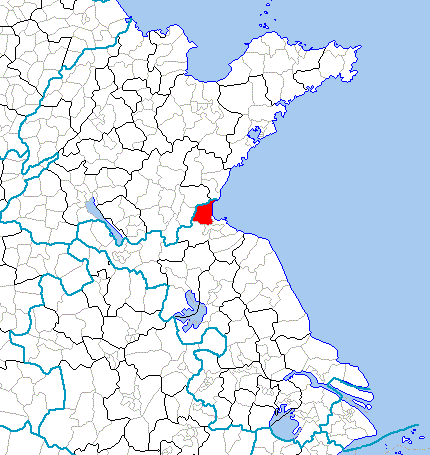
- Administrative boundaries in eastern China; provincial boundaries in blue

- Location in Jiangsu
- Coordinates: 34°54′00″N 119°02′10″E
- Country: People's Republic of China
- Province: Jiangsu
- Prefecture-level city: Lianyungang
- Township-level divisions: 18 towns
- Seat: Qingkou (青口镇)

Area
  - Total: 1,363 km^{2} (526 sq mi)

Population (2020)
  - Total: 1,003,844
  - Density: 736.5/km^{2} (1,908/sq mi)
- Time zone: UTC+8 (China Standard)
- Postal code: 222100
- Area code: 0518

Ganyu District (simplified Chinese: 赣榆区; traditional Chinese: 贛榆區; pinyin: Gànyúqū) is a suburban district under the administration of Lianyungang, Jiangsu Province, China. It contains the province's northernmost point and is located along the Yellow Sea coast where the coastline takes a sharp turn toward the southeast, and borders the Shandong prefecture-level cities of Linyi and Rizhao to the north.

== History ==
The modern incarnation of Ganyu District was established in 280 AD during the reunification of China following the conquest of Eastern Wu by the Jin dynasty. It was previously an entity under the jurisdiction of Langya Commandery between its establishment by the Qin dynasty in 221 BC and 198 AD.

== Culture ==
Unlike the rest of northern Jiangsu, where Jianghuai Mandarin is the predominant dialect, the locals of Ganyu speak the Ganyu dialect of Jiaoliao Mandarin, which is also native to eastern Shandong and most of the Liaodong peninsula.

== Demographics ==
According to the Fifth National Population Census of the People's Republic of China, there are 49 nations in Ganyu. Among all the people, the Han population accounts for 99.8% and the ethnic minority population account for 0.2%.

== Geography and climate ==
Ganyu has a humid subtropical climate (Köppen Cwa) influenced by the East Asian Monsoon. The winters are cold and quite dry, while the summers are hot, rainy, and humid. The normal monthly mean temperature ranges from 0.3 °C (32.5 °F) in January to 26.7 °C (80.1 °F) in July, and the annual mean is 14.2 °C (57.6 °F). The annual precipitation of 912.2 mm (35.91 in) is heavily concentrated in the summer and other warmer months.

Climate data for Ganyu District, elevation 5 m (16 ft), (1991–2020 normals, extremes 1957–present)
Month	Jan	Feb	Mar	Apr	May	Jun	Jul	Aug	Sep	Oct	Nov	Dec	Year
Record high °C (°F)	17.0 (62.6)	25.0 (77.0)	30.5 (86.9)	33.4 (92.1)	37.3 (99.1)	38.7 (101.7)	39.5 (103.1)	38.5 (101.3)	35.4 (95.7)	31.6 (88.9)	27.1 (80.8)	19.9 (67.8)	39.5 (103.1)
Mean daily maximum °C (°F)	4.9 (40.8)	7.5 (45.5)	12.8 (55.0)	19.2 (66.6)	24.6 (76.3)	27.6 (81.7)	30.2 (86.4)	29.7 (85.5)	26.3 (79.3)	21.2 (70.2)	14.1 (57.4)	7.2 (45.0)	18.8 (65.8)
Daily mean °C (°F)	0.3 (32.5)	2.7 (36.9)	7.7 (45.9)	14.0 (57.2)	19.6 (67.3)	23.5 (74.3)	26.7 (80.1)	26.3 (79.3)	22.1 (71.8)	16.3 (61.3)	9.2 (48.6)	2.5 (36.5)	14.2 (57.6)
Mean daily minimum °C (°F)	−3.3 (26.1)	−1.0 (30.2)	3.4 (38.1)	9.3 (48.7)	15.2 (59.4)	20.0 (68.0)	23.9 (75.0)	23.4 (74.1)	18.5 (65.3)	12.0 (53.6)	5.1 (41.2)	−1.2 (29.8)	10.4 (50.8)
Record low °C (°F)	−16.0 (3.2)	−19.5 (−3.1)	−11.4 (11.5)	−3.9 (25.0)	2.5 (36.5)	11.2 (52.2)	16.2 (61.2)	13.6 (56.5)	6.2 (43.2)	−1.6 (29.1)	−8.0 (17.6)	−14.7 (5.5)	−19.5 (−3.1)
Average precipitation mm (inches)	16.5 (0.65)	21.9 (0.86)	30.7 (1.21)	41.2 (1.62)	74.1 (2.92)	101.3 (3.99)	241.6 (9.51)	207.0 (8.15)	88.4 (3.48)	34.8 (1.37)	36.3 (1.43)	18.4 (0.72)	912.2 (35.91)
Average precipitation days (≥ 0.1 mm)	4.0	5.2	6.4	6.6	8.3	8.6	14.0	11.0	7.6	6.6	5.4	3.6	87.3
Average relative humidity (%)	66	68	65	66	70	77	83	83	77	71	69	66	72
Mean monthly sunshine hours	175.5	172.9	204.9	227.5	254.8	226.9	208.1	234.0	219.0	211.8	181.2	178.8	2,495.4
Percentage possible sunshine	56	56	56	58	59	53	47	56	59	60	58	59	56
Source: China Meteorological Administration all-time extremes

== Notable people from Ganyu ==
- Hou Yong (侯勇), actor
- Tang Zi (唐咨), military general of the Three Kingdoms period
- Xu Fu (徐福), ancient alchemist, mariner, and explorer
- Wang Yilin (王宜林), businessman and oil magnate

== Famous food ==
- Jianbing (煎饼)

== Administrative divisions ==
There are 18 towns in the district:

- Qingkou (Tsingkow) (青口镇)
- Zhewang (柘汪镇)
- Shiqiao (石桥镇)
- Jinshan (金山镇)
- Heilin (黑林镇)
- Lizhuang (厉庄镇)
- Haitou (海头镇)
- Tashan (塔山镇)
- Ganma (赣马镇)
- Banzhuang (班庄镇)
- Chengtou (城头镇)
- Menhe (门河镇)
- Chengxi (城西镇)
- Huandun (欢墩镇)
- Songzhuang (宋庄镇)
- Shahe (沙河镇)
- Dunshang (墩尚镇)
- Luoyang (罗阳镇)
