= Yamaha Stadium =

Football stadium in Iwata City, Japan

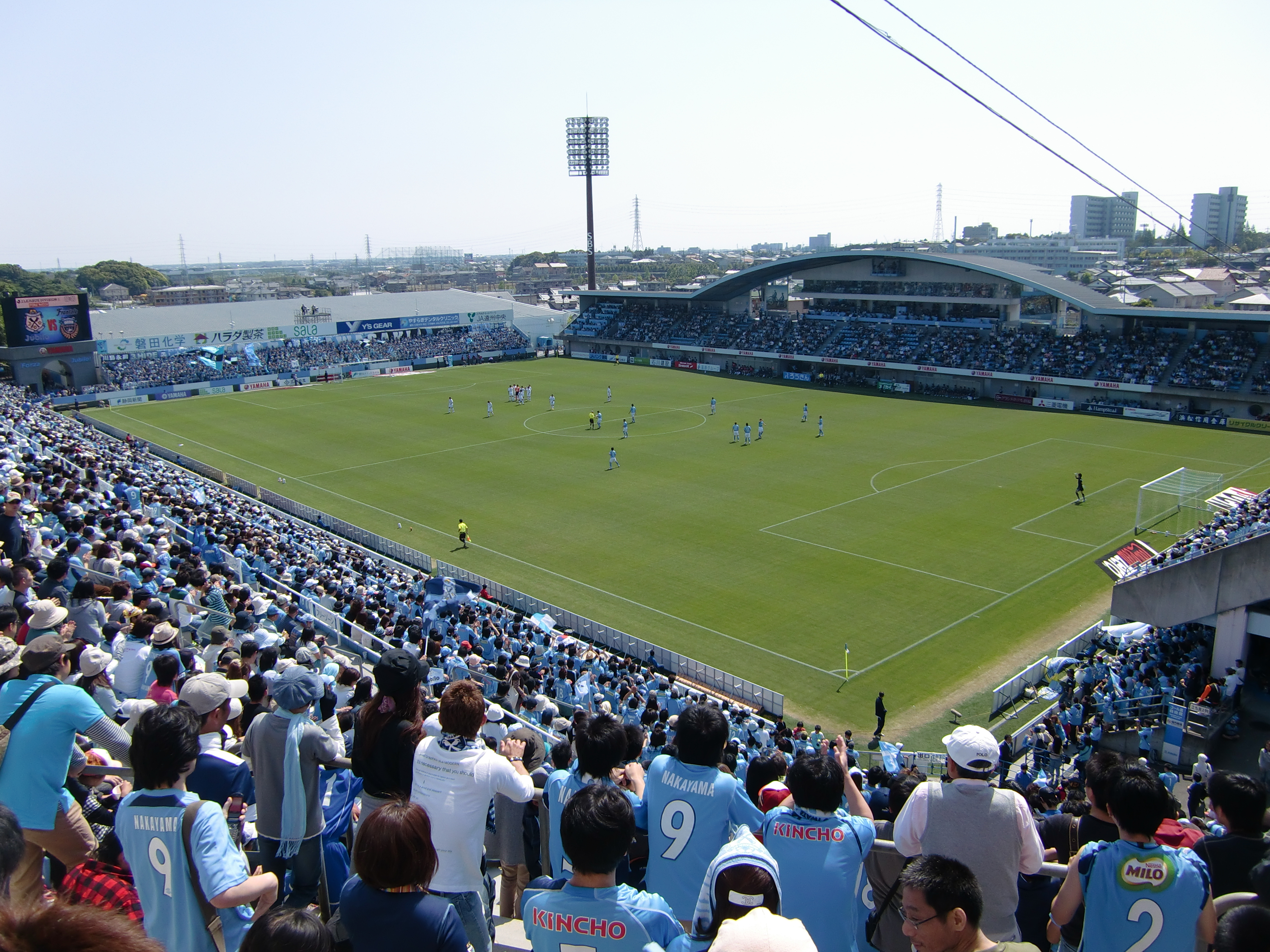
- Interactive map of Yamaha Stadium
- Former names: Yamaha Higashiyama Stadium (1978–1994); Júbilo Iwata Stadium (1994–2003)
- Location: Iwata, Japan
- Coordinates: 34°43′31″N 137°52′30″E
- Owner: Yamaha Motor Co., Ltd.
- Capacity: 15,165
- Surface: Grass
- Scoreboard: Diamond Vision 8.64m×15.36m 132.7sqm
- Field size: 111 m x 74.5 m

Construction
- Opened: 1978
- Renovated: 2002, 2013
- Expanded: 1994

Tenants
- Júbilo Iwata (J.League); Shizuoka Blue Revs (Japan Rugby League One)

Yamaha Stadium (ヤマハスタジアム, Yamaha Sutajiamu) is a football stadium located in Iwata City, Shizuoka Prefecture, Japan, owned by Yamaha Motors, next to whose plant it is located, and was purpose-designed for use with soccer and rugby union.

It is the home ground for the J2 League club Júbilo Iwata, and the rugby union team Shizuoka Blue Revs. The stadium has a seating capacity of 15,165 people.

The stadium is approximately 20 minutes away walking from Mikuriya Station on the Tokaido Main Line.
