= Mikuriya Station (Shizuoka) =

Railway station in Iwata, Shizuoka prefecture, Japan

CA30 Mikuriya Station 御厨駅
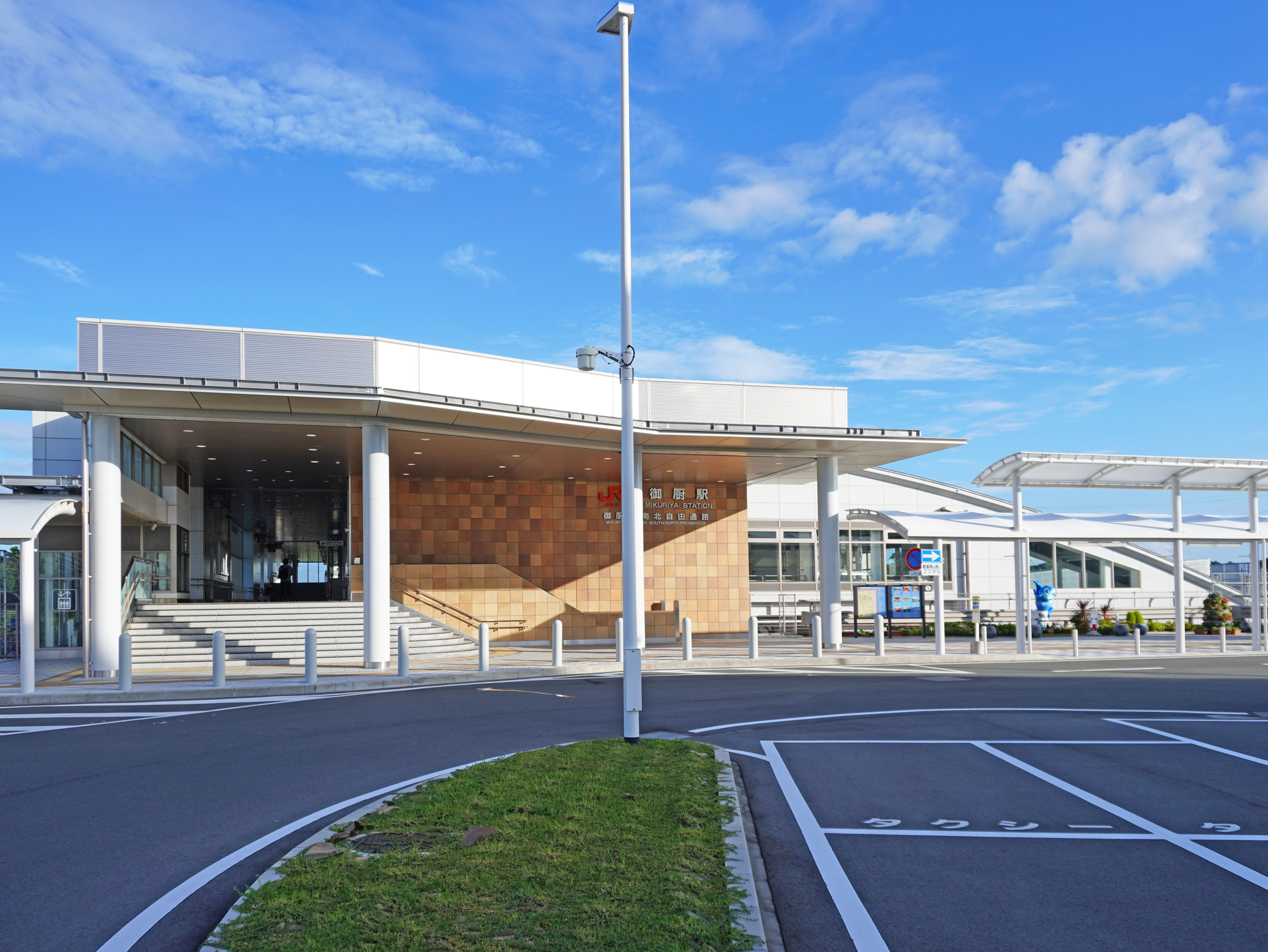
- JR Mikuriya Station in September 2022

General information
- Location: 2111-4 Kita-bouju, Kamata, Iwata-shi, Shizuoka-ken; Japan
- Coordinates: 34°43′06″N 137°53′06″E
- Operator: JR Central
- Line: Tokaido Main Line
- Distance: 242.7 kilometers from Tokyo
- Platforms: 2 side platforms

Other information
- Status: Staffed

History
- Opened: March 14, 2020

Passengers
- 2023–2024: 4,496 daily

Services
Preceding station	JR Central	Following station
Iwata CA31 towards Maibara	Tōkaidō Main Line Local	Fukuroi CA29 towards Atami
Location
- Location within Shizuoka Prefecture Location within Japan

Mikuriya Station (御厨駅, Mikuriya-eki) is a railway station in the city of Iwata, Shizuoka Prefecture, Japan, It is operated by the Central Japan Railway Company (JR Tōkai).

== Routes ==
Mikuriya Station is served by the JR Tōkai Tōkaidō Main Line, and is located 242.7 km (150.8 mi) from the origin of the line in Tokyo.

== Station ==
The station has two side platforms, each serving one track.

=== Platforms ===
1	■ Tōkaidō Main Line	For Numazu, Shizuoka
2	■ Tōkaidō Main Line	For Hamamatsu, Toyohashi

== History ==
Mikuriya Station opened on 14 March 2020. The station is close to the factory and offices of Yamaha Motor Company, as well as Yamaha Stadium, home to J. League club Júbilo Iwata.

== See also ==
- List of railway stations in Japan
