= Ainos =

Ainos may refer to:

- Aenus (Thrace), an ancient Greek city in Thrace, near the Aegean coast
- Mount Ainos, on the island Cefalonia
- Ainu people of Japan
