= Xuzhou dialect =

Mandarin dialect of Jiangsu, China

- 徐州話
- Native to: China
- Region: Xuzhou, Jiangsu
- Language family: Sino-Tibetan: Sinitic; Chinese; Mandarin; Zhongyuan; Xuzhou dialect

Language codes
- ISO 639-3: –
- Glottolog: None

The Xuzhou dialect (simplified Chinese: 徐州话; traditional Chinese: 徐州話; pinyin: Xúzhōuhuà) is a Mandarin dialect spoken in the city of Xuzhou in Jiangsu province, China.

Jiangsu has two basic dialect types: that of the south, influenced by Wu, and that of the north. Beginning roughly in the area extending from Changzhou to Danyang, there is a change in the dialects spoken. From the north of Yangzhou, the dialect begins to take on the essential form of the northern Jiangsu dialect. The Xuzhou dialect is the point where the northern dialects of Jiangsu meet the dialects of Shandong.

The Xuzhou dialect also reflects the influence of Shanxi, whose dialects were imported by migrants from Shanxi to Xuzhou during the Sui dynasty. Peixian, which is a region under the auspices of the city of Xuzhou, was the destination of the majority of migrants from Shanxi. There are important differences in the dialects of Xuzhou and Peixian, which show the results of the Shanxi influence.

The Xuzhou dialect has the two extra initials /ȵ/ and /w̃/ compared with Standard Mandarin. Lacking of /t͡ʃ/ and disappearing of the "round-sharp" distinction are also its traits.

The Xuzhou dialect claims a rich vocabulary of unique terms, and also has important tonal differences from Standard Mandarin. The form of the Xuzhou dialect commonly spoken in the city is often referred to as 徐普 (Xúpǔ, Xuzhou Mandarin), reflecting the influence of dominant Mandarin on the local dialect. Nonetheless, there are crucial differences between the tonal character of standard Chinese and the Xuzhou dialect. Two scholars, Li Shen and Su Xiaoqing, provide different data concerning tone contour.

Tones	平 píng		3 上 shǎng	4 去 qù
Tones	1 阴 yīn	2 阳 yáng	3 上 shǎng	4 去 qù
Xuzhou (Li's data)	˨˩˧ (213)	˦˥ (45)	˧˥ (35)	˦˨ (42)
Xuzhou (Su's data)	˨˩˧ (213)	˥ (55)	˨˦ (24)	˥˩ (51)
Luoyang	˧˦ (34)	˦˨ (42)	˥˦ (54)	˧˩ (31)
Beijing	˥ (55)	˧˥ (35)	˨˩˦ (214)	˥˩ (51)
