= Southern Mandarin =

Southern Mandarin may refer to:

- Jianghuai Mandarin
- Southwestern Mandarin
