= Äynu people =

Turkic ethnic group in Xinjiang, China

Äynu
ئەينۇ

Total population
- 30,000–50,000

Regions with significant populations
- Xinjiang, China

Languages
- Äynu, Uyghur and Central Plains Mandarin

Religion
- Islam

Related ethnic groups
- Uyghurs, Ili Turks, Tor Tajiks, Abdals of Turkey, Uzbeks, other Turkic peoples

The Äynu (also Ainu, Abdal or Aini) are a Turkic people native to the Xinjiang region of China, where they are an unrecognized ethnic group legally counted as Uyghurs. They speak the Äynu language and mainly adhere to Islam. There are estimated to be around 30,000 to 50,000 Äynu people, mostly located on the fringe of the Taklamakan Desert.

== History ==
The origins of the Äynu people are disputed. Some historians theorize that the ancestors of the Äynu were an Iranian-related nomadic people who came from Persia several hundred years ago or more, while others conclude that the Persian vocabulary of the Äynu language is a result of Iranian languages being once the major trade languages of the region or Persian traders intermarrying with local women.

The Äynu at some point converted to Islam in tandem with the Turkic peoples that resided in the region. Tension with the Uyghurs and other Turkic peoples of the area resulted in them being pushed out to the less fertile region of the Tarim Basin near the Taklamakan Desert.

The Äynu joined the rebellion of Yakub Beg around 1864 against Qing rule. In the 1930s, the Äynu joined the Kumul rebellion. After the establishment of the Communist state in 1949, certain ethnic groups were given recognition by the state and allowed more cultural freedom. The Äynu applied to be recognized as a distinct ethnic group but were rejected and the state chose to count them as Uyghurs instead.

== Language ==
The Äynu people's native language is Äynu, a Turkic language with a strong influence from Persian. Äynu is usually only spoken at home, while Uyghur is spoken in public, by Äynu men and women alike.

== Culture ==
=== Livelihood ===
The Äynu people engage mostly in agriculture, animal husbandry or work in the construction industry in the cities. A few also fish or hunt. In the past some were peddlers, circumcisers or beggars.

=== Discrimination ===
There is a tradition of discrimination against the Äynu by their neighbors, who identify the Äynu as Abdal, a name which carries a derogatory meaning. Intermarriage with their neighbors such as the Uyghurs is uncommon. The Chinese government, however, counts the Äynu people as Uyghur.

=== Religion ===
The Äynu are generically identified as Muslims; however, the specific characteristics and practices of their religious traditions have not been well documented.
