= Äynu language =

Karluk Turkic cryptolect

Äynu
- Abdal
- ئەينۇ, Äynú
- Äynu in Uyghur script.
- Pronunciation: Ainu pronunciation: [ɛjˈnu]
- Native to: China
- Region: Xinjiang
- Ethnicity: Äynu
- Native speakers: 12,000 (2017)
- Language family: Mixed: Persian-Turkic; Äynu
- Writing system: Arabic script

Language codes
- ISO 639-3: aib
- Glottolog: ainu1251
- ELP: Ainu (China)
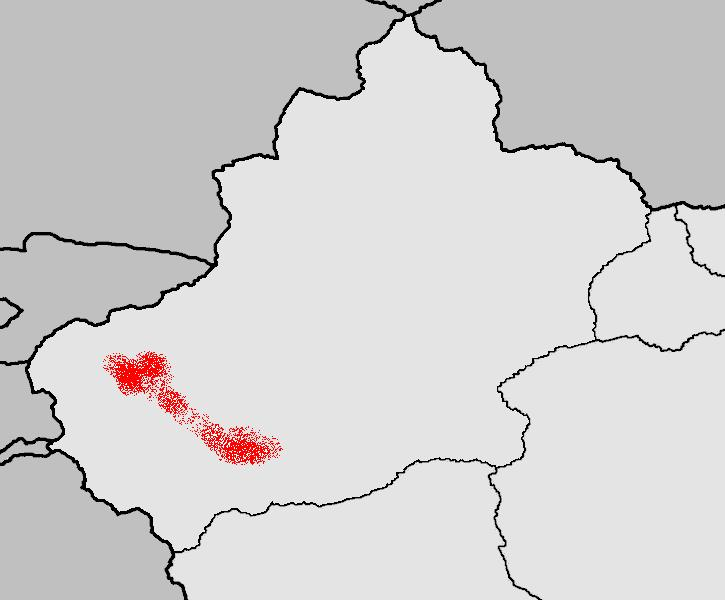
- Map showing locations of Äynu (red) within Xinjiang

Äynu (also known as Abdal) is a Persian-Turkic cryptolect spoken in Western China. It is spoken by the Äynu, a nomadic people, who use it to keep their communications secret from outsiders.

The grammar of Äynu is mostly Turkic, essentially Uyghur, while its vocabulary is mainly derived from Persian and other Iranian languages. Some linguists call it a mixed language, but other linguists argue that it does not meet the technical requirements of a mixed language.

== Name ==
The language is known by many different spellings, including Abdal, Aini, Ainu, Ayni, Aynu, Eyni and Eynu. The Abdal (ئابدال) spelling is commonly used in Uyghur sources. Russian sources use Eynu, Aynu, Abdal (Эйну, Айну, Абдал) and Chinese uses the spelling Ainu (艾努). The Äynu people call their language Äynú (ئەينۇ, [ɛjˈnu]).

== Geographic distribution ==
Äynu is spoken in Western China among Alevi Muslims in Xinjiang on the edge of the Taklimakan Desert in the Tarim Basin.

Similarly mixed varieties of Turkic and Persian are spoken in other locations including Turkey and Uzbekistan. The speakers of these varieties are also referred to as "Abdal".

== Use as a secret language ==
The only speakers of Äynu are adult men, who are found to speak it outside of their area of settlement in order to communicate without being understood by others. Uyghur is spoken with outsiders who do not speak Äynu and at home when it is not necessary to disguise one's speech.

== Phonology ==
=== Consonants ===
Consonant phonemes
	Labial		Alveolar		Alveo- Palatal		Velar		Uvular		Glottal
Nasal	m		n				ŋ				
Plosive/Affricate	p	b	t	d	t͡ʃ	d͡ʒ	k	ɡ	q		
Fricative		v	s	z	ʃ				χ	ʁ	ɦ
Flap/Tap			r								
Approximant			l		j						

/j/ is a palatal consonant. Phonemes on the left of a cell are voiceless, while those on the right are voiced.

=== Vowels ===
Äynu vowels

Vowel Phonemes
	Front	Central	Back
Close	i	ʉ	u
Mid	e	ɵ	o
Open	ɛ		a

== Orthography ==
Due to Äynu's secretive nature, along with a lack of official status in areas which it is spoken in, it does not have any widely used writing system. However, the Uyghur Arabic alphabet is typically used in the occasion where it needs to be written.

== Vocabulary ==
Most of the basic vocabulary in Äynu comes from the Iranian languages, which might be speculated that the language have been originally an Iranian language and have been turned into a Turkic language after a long period. There are three vocabulary formation methods in the Äynu language: simple words, derived words, and compound words. The affixes of derived words have both Uyghur and Persian origin. Old people mostly use Persian affixes, while the young people use Uyghur derived vocabulary and affixes.

=== Numerals ===
Äynu numerals are completely Persian. However, ordinal adjectives are made by adding Uyghur -(I)ncI suffix.

==== Numbers ====
English	Äynu	Persian	Uyghur
one	yek	yek	bir
two	du	du	ikki
three	si	se	üç
five	pence	penc	peş
ten	deh	deh	on
twenty	bist	bist	yigirme

==== Ordinal adjectives ====
English	Äynu	Persian	Uyghur
first	yekinci	yek	bir
second	durinci	duvum	ikkinçi
third	sirinci	sivum	üçinci
fifth	pencinci	pencum	beşinci
tenth	dehinci	dehum	onınçı
twentieth	bistinci	bistum	yigirminçi
