= Aino Station (Shizuoka) =

Railway station in Fukuroi, Shizuoka Prefecture, Japan

CA28 Aino Station 愛野駅
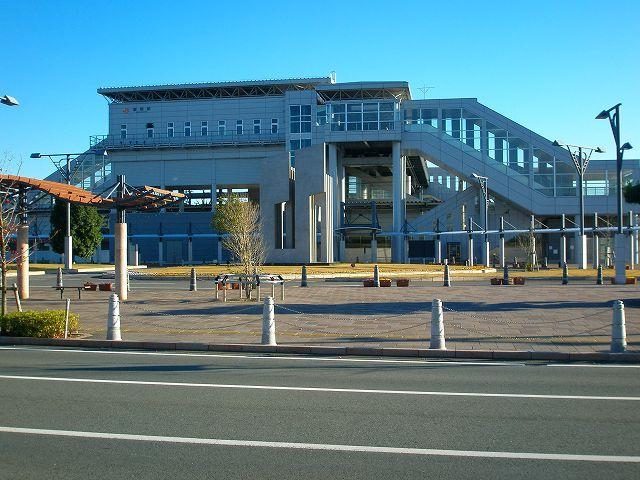
- JR Aino Station in 2006

General information
- Location: 691-8 Aino, Fukuroi-shi, Shizuoka-ken; Japan
- Coordinates: 34°45′9″N 137°57′42″E
- Operator: JR Central
- Line: Tokaido Main Line
- Distance: 234.6 kilometers from Tokyo
- Platforms: 1 island platform
- Tracks: 2

Construction
- Structure type: Ground level
- Accessible: Yes

Other information
- Status: Staffed ("Midori no Madoguchi")
- Station code: CA28

History
- Opened: April 22, 2001

Passengers
- 2023–2024: 5,844 daily
Location
- Location within Shizuoka Prefecture Location within Japan

Aino Station (愛野駅, Aino-eki) is a railway station in the city of Fukuroi, Shizuoka Prefecture, Japan, operated by the Central Japan Railway Company (JR Tōkai).

== Lines ==
Aino Station is served by the JR Tōkai Tōkaidō Main Line, and is located 234.6 kilometers from the official starting point of the line at Tokyo.

== Station layout ==
Aino Station has a single island platform, connected by a footbridge on which the two-story station building is constructed. The station has a "Midori no Madoguchi" staffed ticket office.

=== Platforms ===
1	■ Tōkaidō Main Line	For Numazu, Shizuoka
2	■ Tōkaidō Main Line	For Hamamatsu, Toyohashi

== Adjacent stations ==
«	Service	»
Tōkaidō Main Line
Home Liner: Does not stop at this station
Kakegawa	Local	Fukuroi

== Station history ==
Aino Station was opened on 22 April 2001 in conjunction with the 2002 FIFA World Cup as the location closest to the Shizuoka "Ecopa" Stadium.

Station numbering was introduced to the section of the Tōkaidō Line operated JR Central in March 2018; Aino Station was assigned station number CA28.

== Passenger statistics ==
In fiscal 2017, the station was used by an average of 3078 passengers daily (boarding passengers only).

== Surrounding area ==
- Shizuoka Institute of Science and Technology
- Shizuoka Stadium

== See also ==
- List of railway stations in Japan
