= Libra Radio =

Chinese radio station broadcasting in Taiwan

Libra Radio Co., Ltd
- Type: Broadcast radio and online
- Country: Taiwan (Republic of China)
- Availability: Taiwan. China. Worldwide (on line)
- Key people: 朱淑華(Shu-Hua Chu), Chairman
- Launch date: December 21, 2004 2004-12-21
- Former names: Matsu Life Radio Co., Ltd
- Official website: www.libraradio.com.tw

Libra Radio (Chinese: 非凡音廣播電台) is a radio station broadcasting from Taiwan(Republic of China, Lienchiang Country Nangan Township. Libra Radio, formerly known as "Matsu Life Radio," was founded in 2004. In October 2008, it officially changed its name to the Libra Radio. Libra Radio is the first privately owned radio station, and also the first agency of broadcasting advertising business and mainland tourists to Taiwan travel business to partner with a radio station in Mainland China (People's Republic of China) through a cooperative agreement.

== Introduction ==
- Broadcasting station transmitting frequency：FM98.5 (People's Republic of China)
- Chairperson : Ms. Shu-Hua Chu
- Launch station : Lienchiang Country Nangan Township.
- Headquarters : No.40, Ln. 40, Sec. 2, Shuangshi Rd., North Dist., Taichung City 40455, Taiwan (Republic of China)
- Language: Mandarin Chinese, English and Taiwanese dialect (North), supplemented.

== Organization ==
- Libra Radio Broadcasting Company
- Libra Radio news service：Provide News service between China(People's Republic of China)and Taiwan(Republic of China)
- Owned and operated by the Baulin Co., Ltd.： Provide propagation service，commercial advertising agent and commercial trade.

== News ==
- Voice of strait Broadcasting Station and Libra radio press the signing of cooperation agreements
- The two sides to join hands in broadcasting expand the tourism advertising market
- Voice of strait Broadcasting Station and Libra radio cross-strait co-launched “the 2008 the Olympic selection event prizes Star”
