= Lienchiang Cross-Strait Matters Forum =

Forum between mainland China and Taiwan

- Native name: 連江縣兩岸事務座談會
- Date: 5 March 2019
- Location: Lienchiang, Fujian, Republic of China
- Type: Forum
- Participants: Lienchiang County of the Republic of China, Lianjiang County of the People's Republic of China

The Lienchiang Cross-Strait Matters Forum (simplified Chinese: 连江县两岸事务座谈会; traditional Chinese: 連江縣兩岸事務座談會; pinyin: Liánjiāng Xiàn Liǎng'àn Shìwù Zuòtán Huì) is a forum between Lienchiang County of the Republic of China (ROC) and Lianjiang County of the People's Republic of China (PRC) which started in 2019.

== Forums ==
=== 1st Forum ===
The first forum was held on 5 March 2019 in Matsu Folk Cultural Artifacts Exhibition Hall in Nangan Township, Lienchiang County of the Republic of China. Several topics regarding cross-strait sea transportation, tourism, aquaculture, education and health were discussed during the forum. The forum was attended by ROC Lienchiang County Magistrate Liu Cheng-ying.

== See also ==
- Cross-Strait relations
- Cross-Strait Economic, Trade and Culture Forum
- Cross-Strait Peace Forum
- Straits Forum
