= Jinbanjing Tianhou Temple =

Chinese temple in Nangan, Lienchiang, Taiwan

- 金板境天后宮
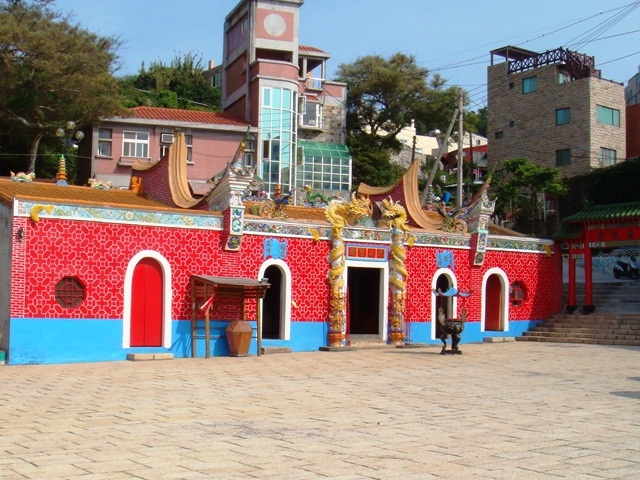

- Taiwan

Location
- Location: Nangan, Lienchiang, Taiwan
- Interactive map of Jinbanjing Tianhou Temple
- Coordinates: 26°08′31.2″N 119°55′28.0″E

Architecture
- Type: Temple
- Style: Chinese

The Jinbanjing Tianhou Temple (Chinese: 金板境天后宮; pinyin: Jīnbǎnjìng Tiānhòu Gōng) is a Mazu temple in Ren'ai Village, Nangan Township, Lienchiang County, Taiwan.

== History ==
The temple was constructed around 400 years ago. Over the years, the temple has undergone several renovation works. It was registered as historic landmark of Lienchiang County in 2009.

== Architecture ==
The temple was constructed with eastern Fujian traditional architectural style. It consists of ancient firewalls and interior courtyard with wooden structure. Its interior was constructed from Fuzhou fir using column and tie beam system. The roof was constructed with extended eaves.

== See also ==
- Qianliyan & Shunfeng'er
- List of Mazu temples around the world
- List of temples in Taiwan
- List of tourist attractions in Taiwan
