= Lienchiang County Hospital =

Hospital in Nangan, Lienchiang, Taiwan

Lienchiang County Hospital 連江縣立醫院
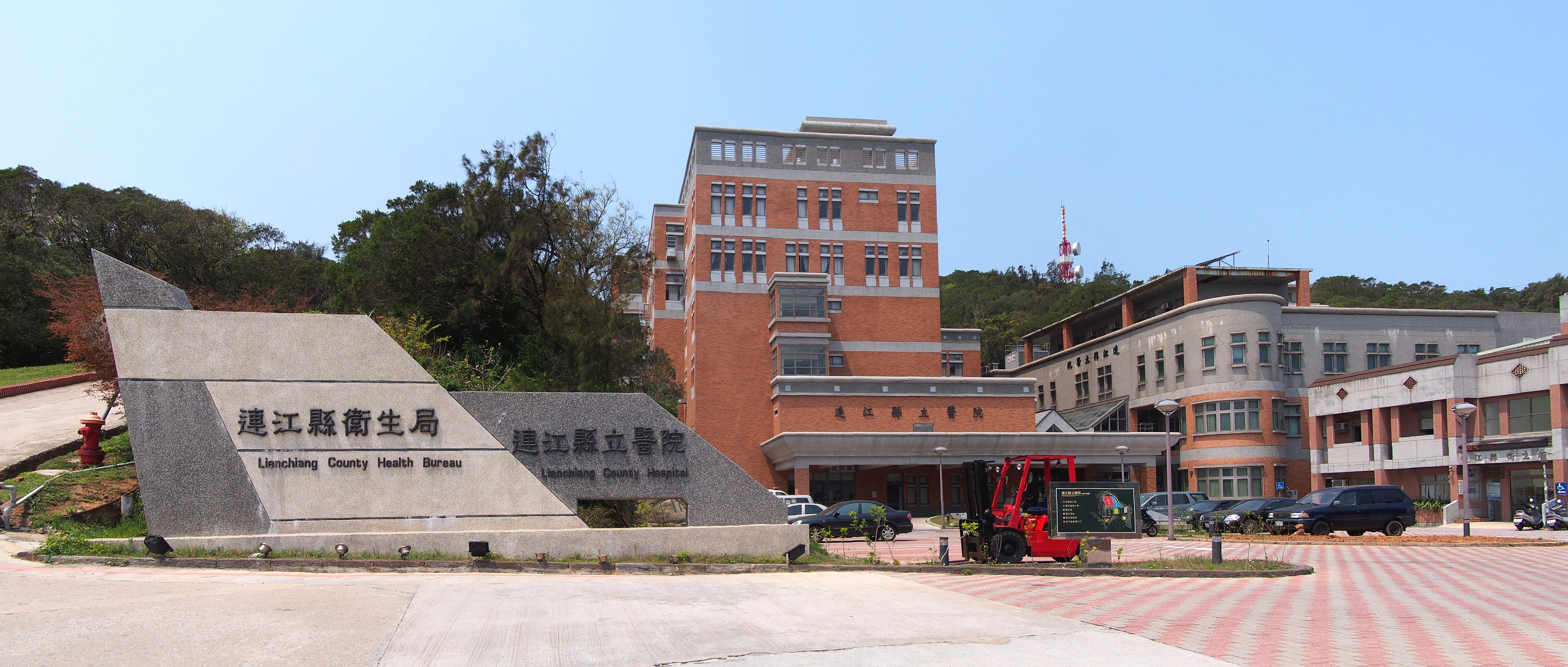

Geography
- Location: Nangan, Lienchiang, Taiwan
- Coordinates: 26°09′39.7″N 119°56′56.1″E

Organisation
- Type: hospital

Services
- Beds: 50

History
- Opened: 1956

Links
- Website: Official website

The Lienchiang County Hospital (traditional Chinese: 連江縣立醫院; simplified Chinese: 连江县立医院; pinyin: Liánjiāng Xiànlì Yīyuàn) is a hospital in Nangan Township, Lienchiang County, Taiwan.

== History ==
The hospital was originally established as Matsu Health Bureau in 1956. In July 1993, it was renamed Lienchiang County Hospital and belonged to Lienchiang County Health Bureau. The new medical building was completed in January 2001 with a total capacity of 50 beds.

== Departments ==
The hospital consists of internal medicine, surgery, pediatrics, obstetrics and gynecology, ophthalmology, rehabilitation, dentistry, nursing, medical laboratory diagnosis, pharmacy, and medical imaging departments.

== See also ==
- List of hospitals in Taiwan
