= Yuntai Mountain =

Yuntai Mountain (云台山) could refer to the following mountains:

- Yuntai Mountain (Henan), near Jiaozuo, Henan
- Yuntai Mountains (Jiangsu), near Lianyungang, Jiangsu
- Yuntai Mountain (Matsu), in Nan'gang, Lienchiang
