= Ching-kuo =

Ching-kuo is a romanization of a Mandarin surname. It may refer to:

- Chiang Ching-kuo (1910–1988), president of the Republic of China (Taiwan)
  - AIDC F-CK-1 Ching-kuo, a multirole combat aircraft named for the former president
  - Chiang Ching-kuo Foundation, a research foundation named for the former president
  - Ching-kuo Memorial Hall, a hall memorializing the former president
- Wu Ching-kuo, a Taiwanese sports executive
- Guo Shoujing (1231–1316), sometimes romanized Kuo Shou-Ching, a Chinese astronomer, hydraulic engineer and mathematician
