= Shengtian Park =

Park in Nangan, Lienchiang, Taiwan

- 勝天公園
- Interactive map of Shengtian Park
- Type: park
- Location: Nangan, Lienchiang, Taiwan
- Coordinates: 26°09′13.1″N 119°54′59.9″E
- Area: 10 hectares (25 acres)

The Shengtian Park (traditional Chinese: 勝天公園; simplified Chinese: 胜天公园; pinyin: Shèngtiān Gōngyuán) is a park in Nangan Township, Lienchiang County, Taiwan.

== History ==
The park features the Shengtian Pavilion which was constructed in 1990 by the Republic of China Armed Forces. In 2004, the pavilion was rebuilt by the Matsu National Scenic Area Administration because it was weakened by the nature.

== Geology ==
The park is located at the western slope of Mount Yuntai. It spans over an area of more than 10 hectares. The park is surrounded by Zelkova forest.

== See also ==
- List of parks in Taiwan
