= Iron Fort =

Former fort in Nangan, Lienchiang, Taiwan

- 鐵堡
- Nangan, Lienchiang, Taiwan
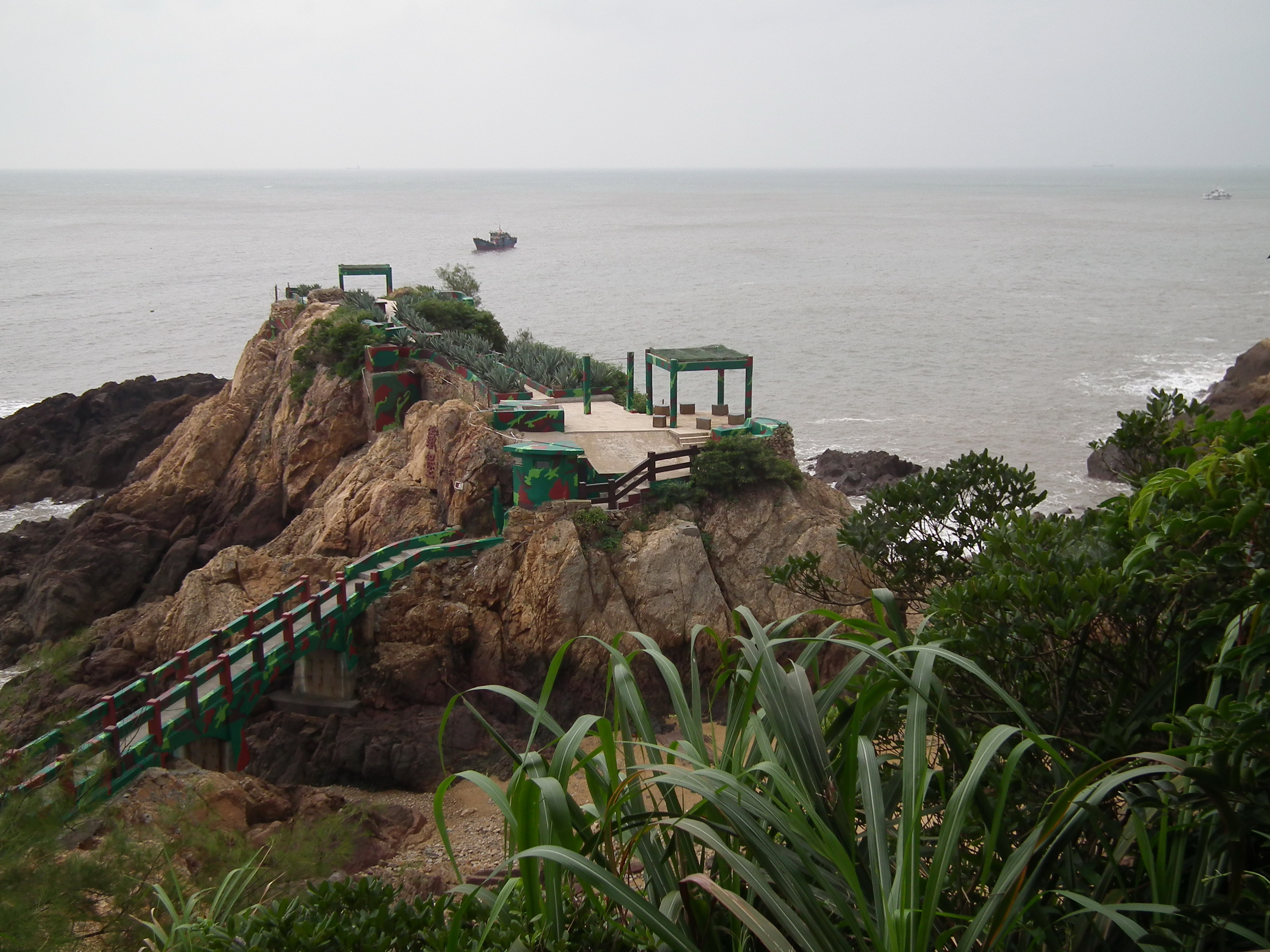

Site information
- Type: fort

Location
- Coordinates: 26°08′29.5″N 119°55′14.7″E

The Iron Fort (traditional Chinese: 鐵堡; simplified Chinese: 铁堡; pinyin: Tiě Bǎo) is a former fort in Ren'ai Village, Nangan Township, Lienchiang County, Taiwan.

== History ==
The fort was originally constructed as the training base for the amphibious forces.

== Architecture ==
The fort was constructed at the southern coast of Nangan Island on an offshore rock. The middle of the rock was excavated to form a tunnel which houses various military equipment and accommodation facilities. The granite building is painted with camouflage paint.

== See also ==
- List of tourist attractions in Taiwan
