= Matsu Airport =

The Matsu Airport may be:

- Matsu Beigan Airport, Beigan, Matsu Islands, Taiwan
- Matsu Nangan Airport, Nangan, Matsu Islands, Taiwan
