= Mount Yuntai =

Mount Yuntai may refer to:

- Mount Yuntai (Matsu), a mountain in Taiwan
- Yuntai Mountain (Henan), a mountain in Henan
