= Dahan Stronghold =

Former fort in Nangan, Lienchiang, Taiwan

- 大漢據點
- Nangan, Lienchiang, Taiwan
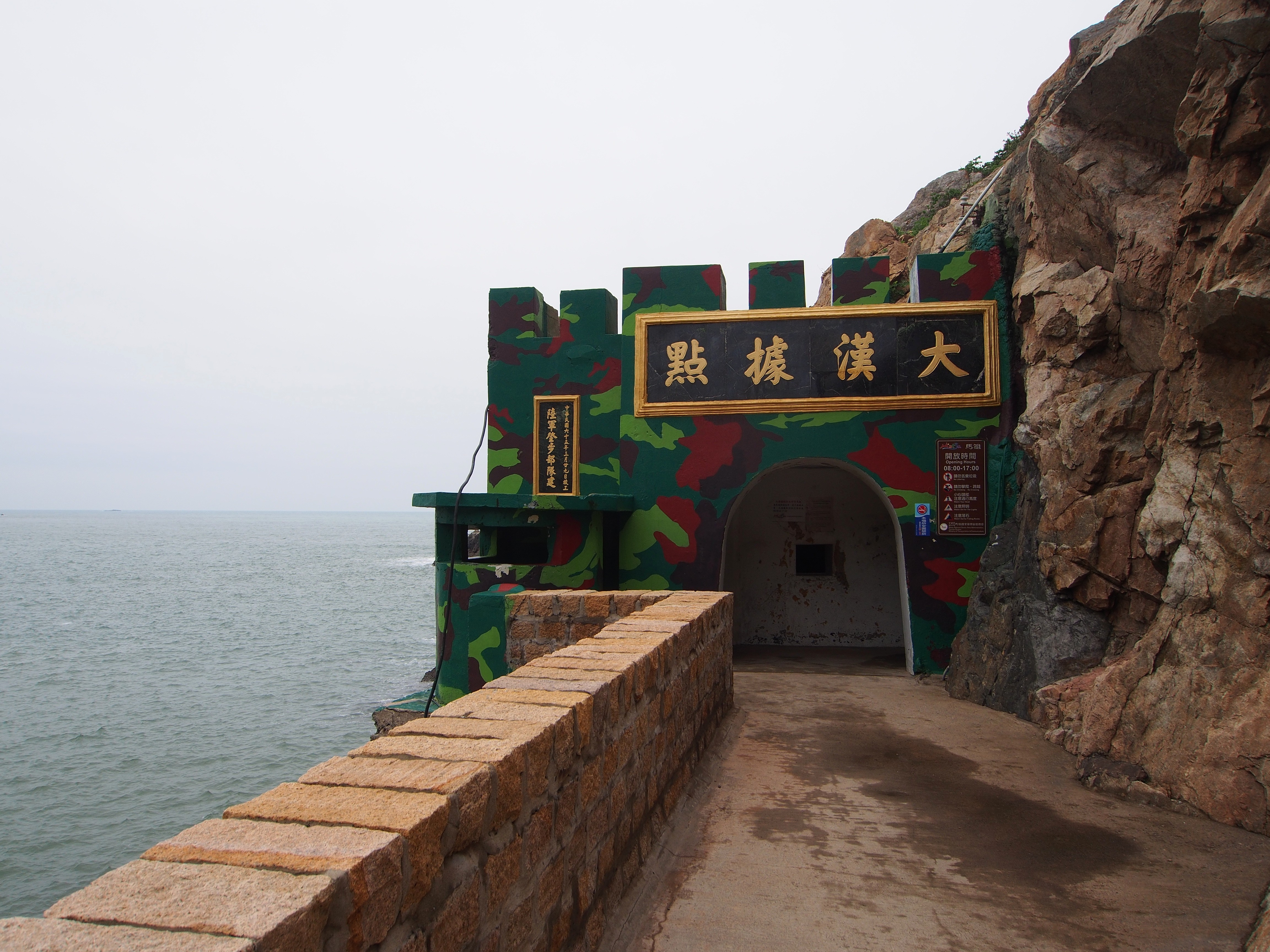

Site information
- Type: fort

Location
- Taiwan
- Coordinates: 26°8′26.3″N 119°55′44.6″E

Site history
- Built: 29 March 1976
- Built by: Republic of China Armed Forces

The Dahan Stronghold (traditional Chinese: 大漢據點; simplified Chinese: 大汉据点; pinyin: Dàhàn Jùdiǎn) is a former fort in Nangan Township, Lienchiang County, Taiwan.

== History ==
The construction of the stronghold began in 1975 by the Republic of China Armed Forces and completed on 29 March 1976. After Matsu Islands was transferred from military to civilian, the structure was administered by Matsu National Scenic Area Administration and was redeveloped for tourism. Renovation was completed in 2006 and it was opened to the public on 10 February 2007.

== Architecture ==
The stronghold consists of three levels, in which the upper level was for the military headquarter, middle level was for accommodation and machine gun reserves and the lower level was for anti-aircraft guns, briefing room and storerooms. It forms a tunnel with a width of 1.2-2 meters, height of 2 meters and length of 430 meters.

== See also ==
- List of tourist attractions in Taiwan
