= Matsu Folk Culture Museum =

Museum in Nangan, Lienchiang, Taiwan

- 馬祖民俗文物館
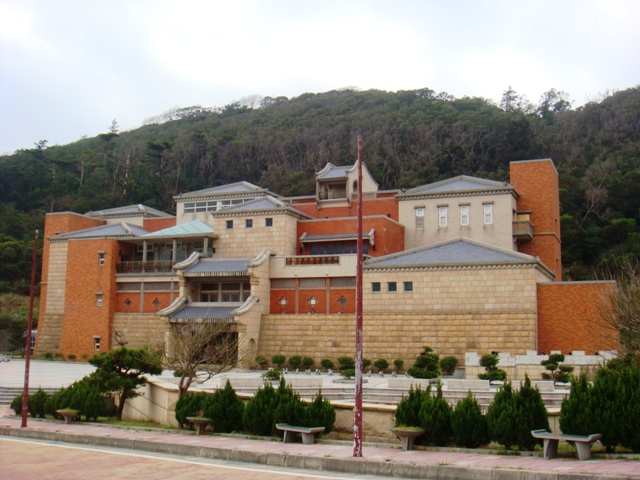
- Established: 1974
- Location: Nangan, Lienchiang, Taiwan
- Coordinates: 26°09′03.62″N 119°56′08.64″E
- Type: museum

The Matsu Folk Culture Museum or Matsu Folk Cultural Artifacts Exhibition Hall (traditional Chinese: 馬祖民俗文物館; simplified Chinese: 马祖民俗文物馆; pinyin: Mǎzǔ Mínsú Wénwùguǎn) is a museum in Nangan Township, Lienchiang County, Fujian Province, Republic of China.

== History ==
The museum was originally built in 1974. In 1983, the museum building was rebuilt and underwent renovation in 2002.

== Architecture ==
The museum building is designed with a traditional Matsu village and Eastern Fujian style and is located in a five-story building to display local cultural artifacts to the visitors coming to the museum.

== Exhibitions ==
The ground floor of the museum displays the archeology of Liangdao Austronesian culture. The two middle floors display the agriculture, fishing and life of local people. The top most floor displays an artwork gallery.

== Notable events ==
- 1st Lienchiang Cross-Strait Matters Forum

== See also ==
- List of museums in Taiwan
