= Dongyin Visitor Center =

Visitor center in Dongyin, Lienchiang, Taiwan

- 東引遊客中心
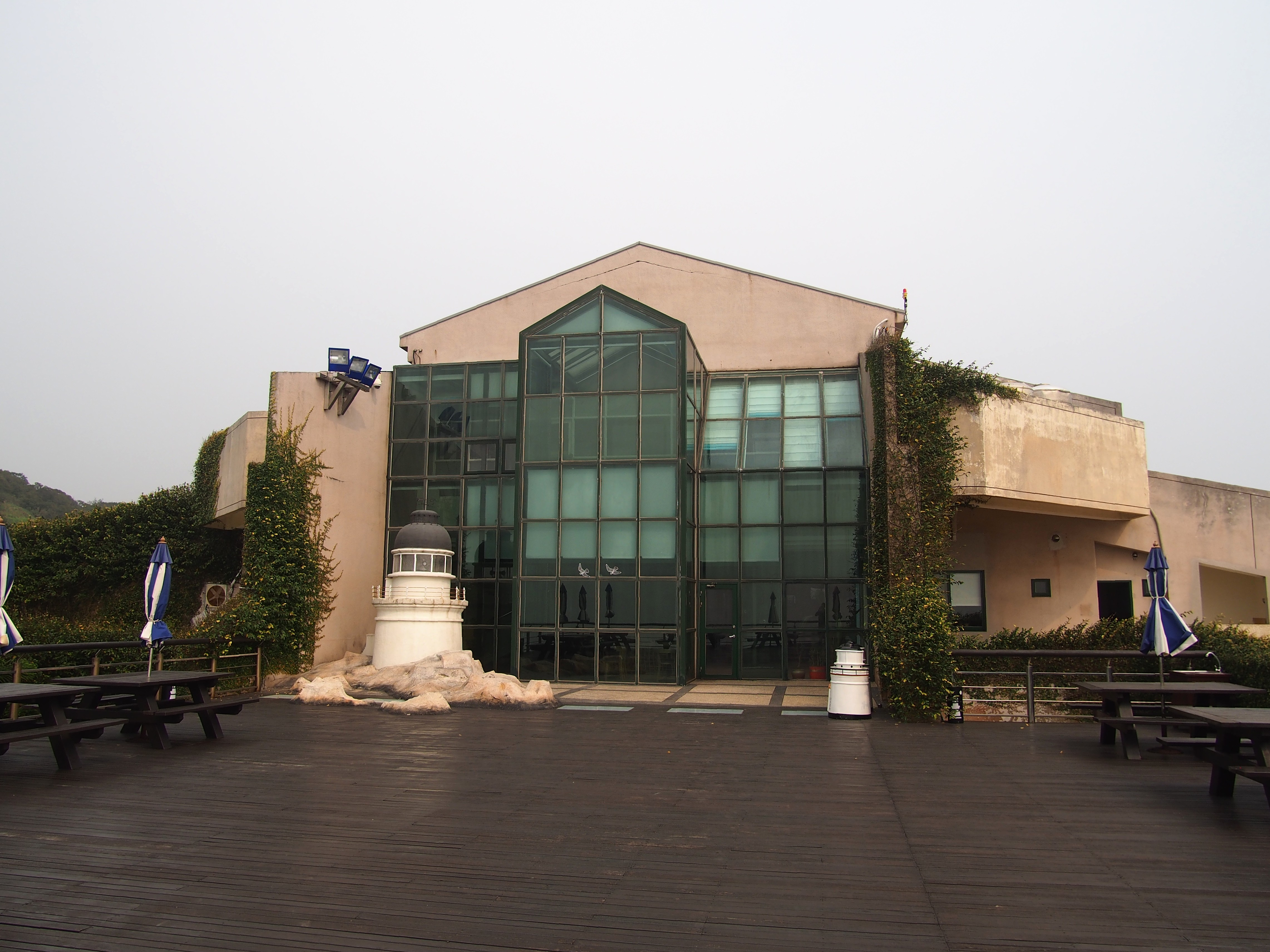
- Interactive map of the Dongyin Visitor Center area

General information
- Type: visitor center
- Location: Dongyin, Lienchiang, Taiwan
- Coordinates: 26°21′36.2″N 120°29′03.2″E
- Completed: 2003

Technical details
- Floor count: 2

The Dongyin Visitor Center (traditional Chinese: 東引遊客中心; simplified Chinese: 东引游客中心; pinyin: Dōngyǐn Yóukè Zhōngxīn) is a visitor center in Lehua Village, Dongyin Township, Lienchiang County, Taiwan.

== History ==
The center was constructed in 2003.

== Architecture ==
The center is a 2-story building located on top of a hill. It has a bright orange roof. On the ground floor there is tourist information counter and a souvenir shop. On the upper floor there is an exhibition room.

== Exhibitions ==
The center displays the ecological scenery of Dongyin which includes introductory video shows.
