= Matsu Blue Tears Ecological Museum =

Museum in Nangan, Lienchiang, Taiwan

- 藍眼淚生態館
- Established: August 2018
- Location: Nangan, Lienchiang, Taiwan
- Coordinates: 26°10′3.6″N 119°55′8.6″E
- Type: museum

The Matsu Blue Tears Ecological Museum (traditional Chinese: 藍眼淚生態館; simplified Chinese: 蓝眼泪生态馆; pinyin: Lán Yǎnlèi Shēngtài Guǎn) is a museum in Nangan Township, Lienchiang County, Taiwan.

== History ==
The museum building used to be the a fishery research institute. Later on it was turned into a museum with cooperation with National Taiwan Ocean University and was opened in August 2018.

== Architecture ==
The museum features a café.

== See also ==
- List of museums in Taiwan
