= Lienchiang County Government =

Government of Lienchiang County, Taiwan

Coordinates: 26.1579°N 119.9518°E

- 連江縣政府
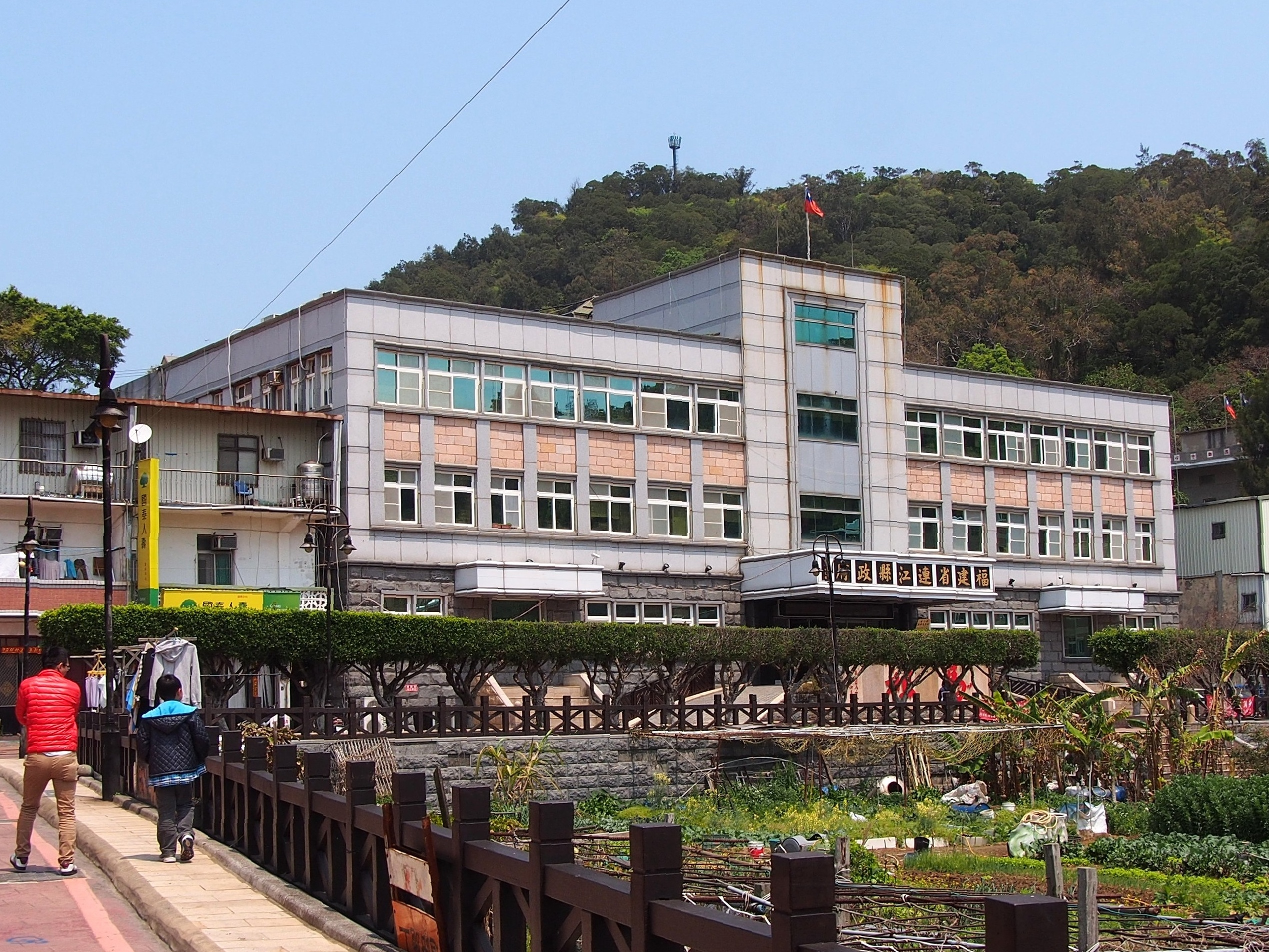

Agency overview
- Jurisdiction: Lienchiang County
- Headquarters: Jieshou Village, Nangan Township
- Agency executive: Wang Chung-ming (KMT), Magistrate
- Website: Official website

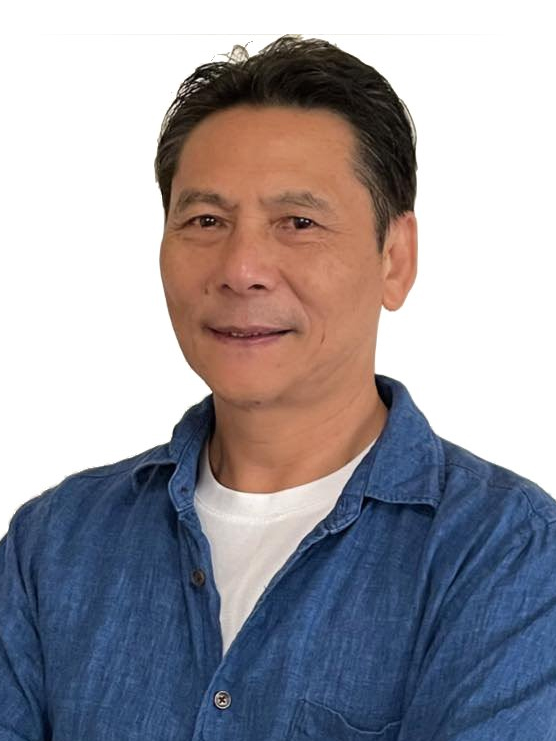
Wang Chung-ming, the incumbent Magistrate of Lienchiang County

The Lienchiang County Government (traditional Chinese: 連江縣政府; simplified Chinese: 连江县政府; pinyin: Liánjiāng Xiàn Zhèngfǔ) is the local government of the Republic of China that governs Lienchiang County.

== Organizational structures ==
=== Internal units and agencies ===
- Accounting and statistics Department
- Civil Affairs Department
- Civil Service Ethics Department
- Cultural Affairs Department
- Economic Development Department
- Education Department
- General Affairs Department
- Personnel Department
- Public Works Department

=== External units and agencies ===
- Environmental Protection Bureau
- Finance and Local Tax Bureau
- Fire Bureau
- Land Administration Bureau
- Police Bureau
- Public Health Bureau
- Traffic and Tourism Bureau

== See also ==
- Lienchiang County Council
