= Zhushan Power Plant =

Power plant in Nangan, Lienchiang, Taiwan

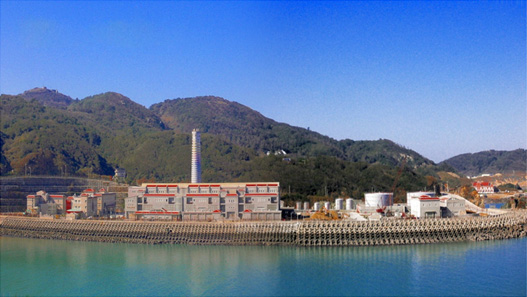
- Official name: 珠山發電廠
- Country: Taiwan (Republic of China)
- Location: Cingshuei Village, Nangan, Lienchiang
- Coordinates: 26°9′23.9″N 119°56′04.2″E
- Status: Operational
- Commission date: 22 March 2010 (Unit 1-4)
- Owner: Taipower
- Operator: Taipower

Thermal power station
- Primary fuel: Diesel fuel

Power generation
- Units operational: 4 X 3.85 MW

External links
- Commons: Related media on Commons

The Zhushan Power Plant (traditional Chinese: 珠山發電廠; simplified Chinese: 珠山发电厂; pinyin: Zhūshān Fādiànchǎng) is a (diesel) fuel-fired power plant in Cingshuei Village, Nangan Township, Matsu Islands, Taiwan (ROC).

== History ==
The installation of the generation units were done in 2007. The construction of the power plant was completed in 2009. It was commissioned on 22 March 2010. In October 2014, the plant was organized to be the subordinate of Hsieh-ho Power Plant in Keelung with the official name of Zhushan Branch Power Plant of the Keelung's plant.

== Generation units ==
The power plant has four diesel fuel-fired units.

== See also ==
- List of power stations in Taiwan
- Electricity sector in Taiwan
