= Mount Yuntai (Matsu) =

Mountain in Nangang, Lienchiang, Taiwan

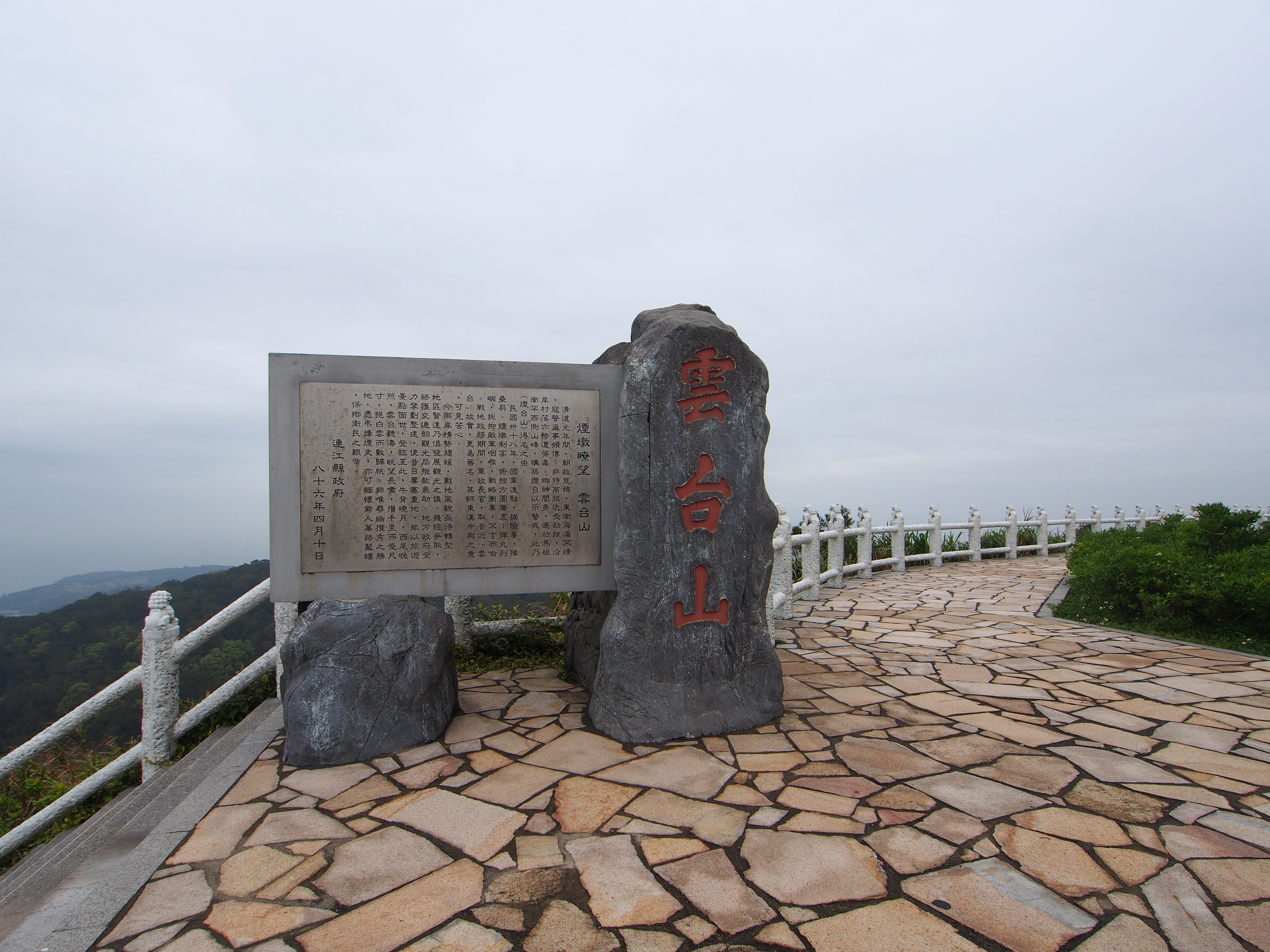

Highest point
- Elevation: 248 m (814 ft)
- Coordinates: 26°09′02.2″N 119°55′23.0″E

Naming
- Native name: 雲台山 (Chinese)

Geography
- Location: Nangan, Lienchiang, Taiwan

The Mount Yuntai (Chinese: 雲台山; pinyin: Yúntái Shān) is a mountain in Nangan Township, Lienchiang County, Taiwan.

== Geology ==
The mountain stands at a height of 248 meters above sea level. It is the highest point in Nangan.

== Architecture ==
At the top of the mountain, there is an observatory platform to view the ocean and the nearby Beijiao Peninsula. It is also being used as a military intelligence building.

== See also ==
- List of tourist attractions in Taiwan
- List of mountains in Taiwan
