= Ching-kuo Memorial Hall =

Memorial hall in Nangan, Lienchiang, Taiwan

- 經國先生紀念堂
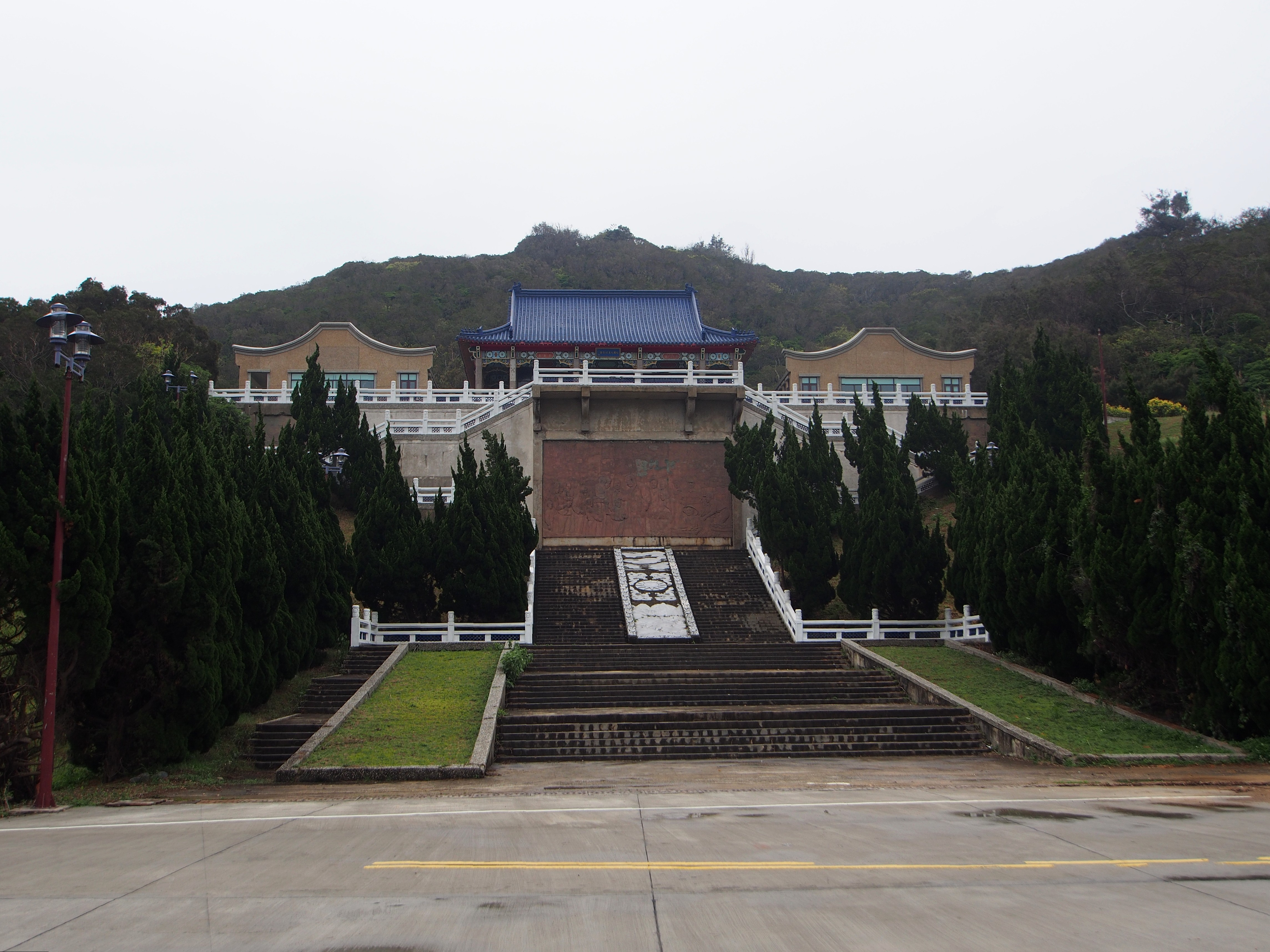
- Interactive map of the Ching-kuo Memorial Hall area

General information
- Type: memorial hall
- Location: Nangan, Lienchiang, Taiwan
- Coordinates: 26°09′01.5″N 119°56′03.0″E
- Completed: June 1994

Technical details
- Floor count: 2
- Floor area: 100 hectares

The Ching-kuo Memorial Hall (Chinese: 經國先生紀念堂; pinyin: Jīngguó Xiānshēng Jìniàn Táng; Wade–Giles: Ching^{1}-kuo^{2} Hsien^{1}-sheng^{1} Chi^{4}-nien^{4} T'ang^{2}) is a memorial hall dedicated to former President of the Republic of China Chiang Ching-kuo located in Nangan Township, Lienchiang County, Taiwan.

== History ==
After President Chiang Ching-kuo passed away on 13 January 1988, political and military chiefs in Lienchiang discussed the construction of memorial to commemorate the President. The construction of the memorial hall was completed in June 1994.

== Architecture ==
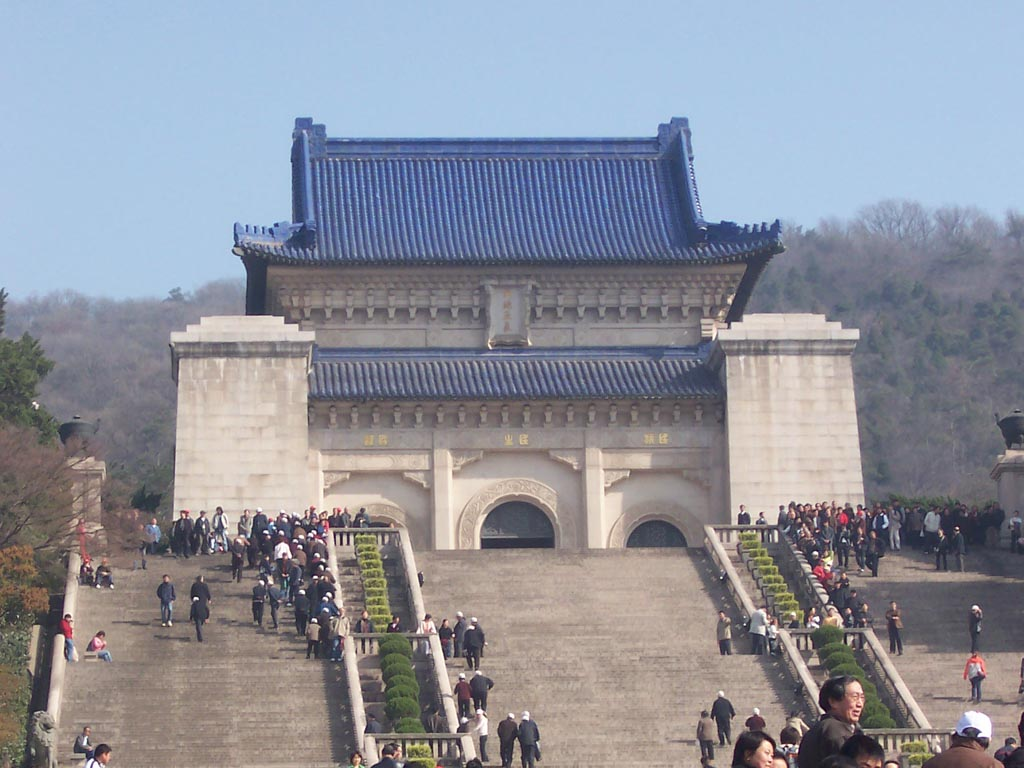
Sun Yat-sen Mausoleum

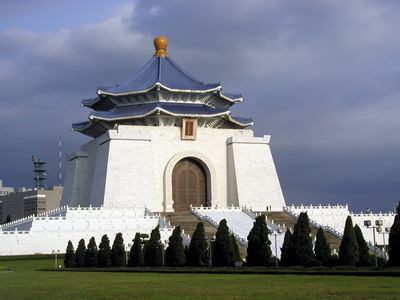
Chiang Kai-shek Memorial Hall

The memorial hall is located in a 2-story building on a hill. It has a total area of around 100 hectares. It was constructed with blue tile and white wall style, taking reference from the Sun Yat-sen Mausoleum in Nanjing and Chiang Kai-shek Memorial Hall in Taipei. The front wall is decorated with a sculpture of President Chiang.

== Exhibitions ==
The ground floor displays a bronze seated statue of Chiang Ching-kuo with his last testament, including mails. The upper floor displays photos during his visits to Lienchiang and his hand-written documents.

== See also ==
- List of tourist attractions in Taiwan
