= Nangan Airport =

Airport on Nangan Island, Fukien Province, Taiwan

Matsu Nangan Airport 南竿航空站 馬祖南竿機場
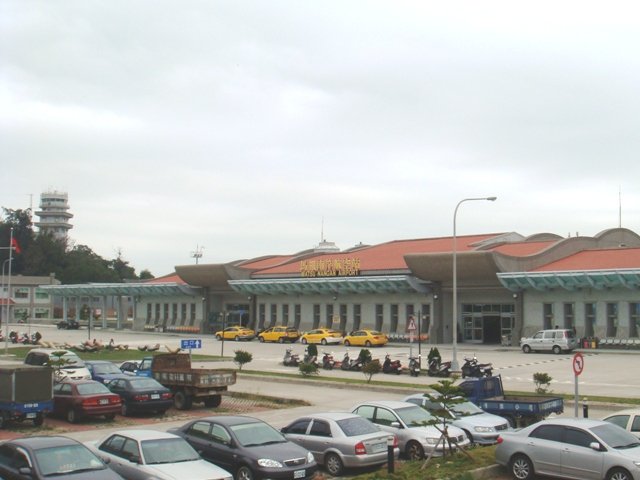
- IATA: LZN; ICAO: RCFG

Summary
- Airport type: Public
- Location: Nangan, Matsu Islands, Taiwan
- Opened: 23 January 2003; 23 years ago
- Elevation AMSL: 71 m / 232 ft
- Coordinates: 26°09′26.7″N 119°57′23″E
- Website: msa.gov.tw

Map
- Location of airport in Taiwan

Runways
Direction	Length		Surface
Direction	m	ft	Surface
03/21	1,579	5,180	Concrete

Matsu Nangan Airport (Chinese: 馬祖南竿機場; pinyin: Mǎzǔ Nángān Jīchǎng) (IATA: LZN, ICAO: RCFG) is one of the airports in Matsu Islands, Lienchiang County, Fukien Province, Taiwan. It is located on the Nangan Island, near the Jieshou Village. It also serves as a heliport. The facility can handle only turboprop planes, like the ATR 72-600.

== Airlines and destinations ==
Airlines	Destinations
Mandarin Airlines	Kaohsiung, Taipei–Songshan
Uni Air	Taichung, Taipei–Songshan

== Transportation ==
The airport is accessible by private car or taxis via the only roadway Zhongyang Boulevard.

== See also ==
- Civil Aeronautics Administration (Taiwan)
- Transportation in Taiwan
- List of airports in Taiwan
