= Nangan, Lienchiang =

Nangan 南竿鄉 Nankan
- Rural township
- Nangan Township
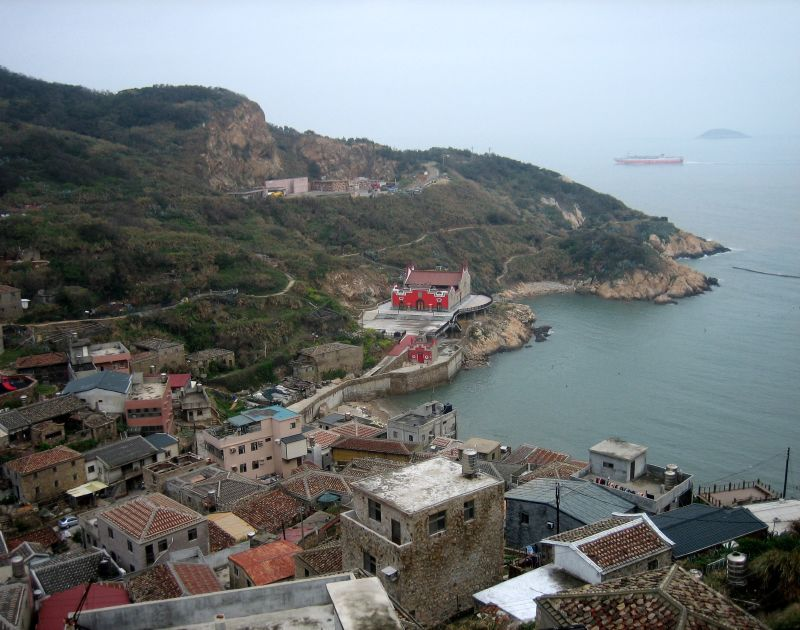
- Fuxing Village in Nangan Township

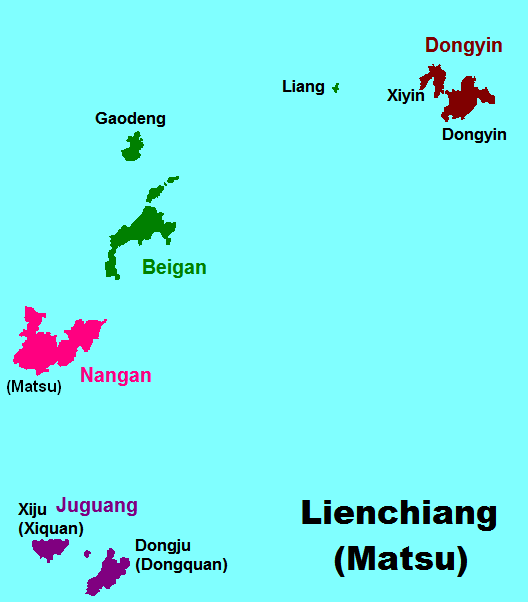
- Nangan Township in Lienchiang County

- Location in the Republic of China
- Coordinates: 26°09′N 119°56′E
- Country: Republic of China (Taiwan)
- Province: Fuchien
- County: Lienchiang
- Rural villages: 9

Government
  - Mayor: Chen Chen-ko (陳振國) (KMT)

Area
  - Total: 10.64 km^{2} (4.11 sq mi)

Population (March 2023)
  - Total: 7,815
  - Density: 734.5/km^{2} (1,902/sq mi)
- Postal code: 209
- Area code: (0)836
- Website: http://www.nankan.gov.tw/

Nangan, Lienchiang
- Traditional Chinese: 南竿鄉
Transcriptions
Standard Mandarin
- Hanyu Pinyin: Nángān Xiāng
- Wade–Giles: Nan²-kan¹ Hsiang¹
- Tongyong Pinyin: Nángan Siang
Hakka
- Romanization: Nàm-kôn-hiông
Southern Min
- Hokkien POJ: Lâm-kan-hiong
Eastern Min
- Fuzhou BUC: Nàng-găng-hiŏng

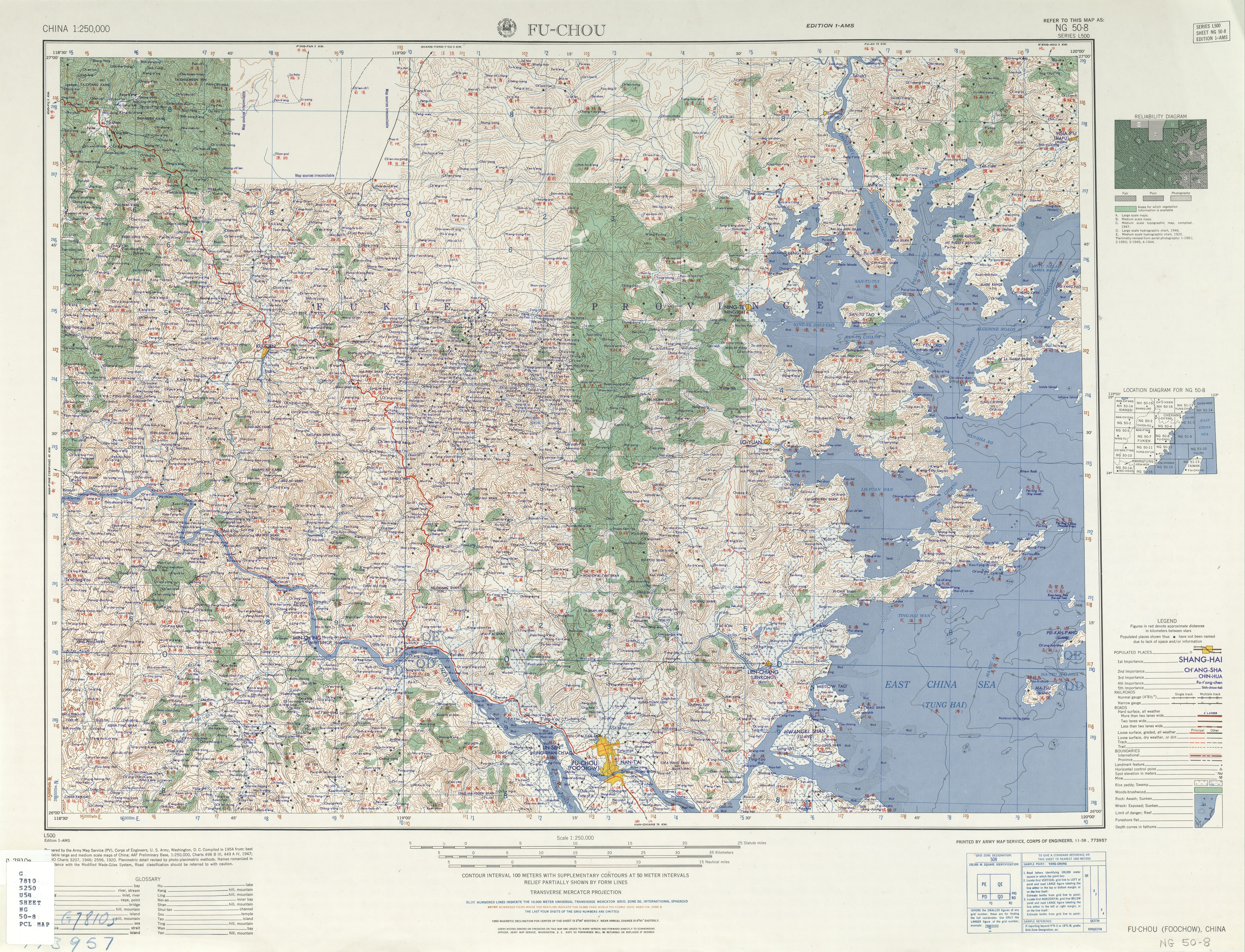
Nangan Island in the East China Sea (labelled as MA-TSU (ISLAND) 馬祖) (1954)

Nangan Township (Chinese: 南竿鄉) is a rural township in the Matsu Islands and the county seat of Lienchiang County, Fuchien Province.

There is an airport in Nangan. The highest point is Yuntai Mountain, at 248 m (814 ft) above sea level.

== Name ==
Nangan Township is named for Nangan Island (Nankan Island), the main island in the township. Nangan was also known Nangantang (南竿塘; Nàng-găng-dòng). Because Lin Moniang's (who later became the Goddess Mazu) bodily relic was claimed to be washed ashore here, Nangan was also known as Matsu Island / Ma-tsu Island / Matsu Shan / Matsu-Shan (Matsoo/ Matsoo shan) (馬祖島; Mā-cū-dō̤). In Song and Ming records, Nangan Island (Matsu Island) was called Shanggantang/Shanggantangshan (上竿塘/上干塘/上竿塘山) as opposed to Beigan Island, which was called Xiagantang/Xiagantangshan (下竿塘/下干塘/下竿塘山).

== History ==
In 1935, a baojia was created including Nangan Island.

In 1949, ROC forces were stationed on Nangan Island.

At 3 AM on January 9, 1966, three seamen from the PRC defected to the ROC at Nangan (Nankan) Island. They were ambushed and killed in transit to Taipei.

In 2000, as part of the Three Links, transportation between Nangan Island's Fuao and Mawei District in Fuzhou was established.

In 2003, Nangan Airport was opened.

On the morning of May 4, 2016, Jiaonan Village (in Tailu, Lianjiang County, Fuzhou, Fujian, China (PRC)) Branch Chinese Communist Party Secretary Liu Wenjian (刘文件) and Niujiao Community Assistant Manager Tsao Erh-Chang (曹爾章) met in Nangan Township and signed a memorandum of mutual exchange and cooperation. Others present included the Magistrate of Lienchiang County, ROC Liu Cheng-ying, Tailu Party Secretary Huang Duanming (黄端明), Nangan Township Mayor Chen Chen-Ko (陳振國) and others.

== Geography ==
The island of Nangan is not only the largest island of its township, but also the largest island of Matsu. Nangan Township is also the largest township in Lienchiang County, with a population of about 4,000. The highest point of the island is the Mount Yuntai peak at 248 meters. Nangan's climate is classified as subtropical, with distinct seasons. The average year-round temperature is 20C, with July and August reaching 34C and January temperatures as low as 1.8C. There is an intense fog period during March and April which often affects the scheduled flights at Nangan Airport.

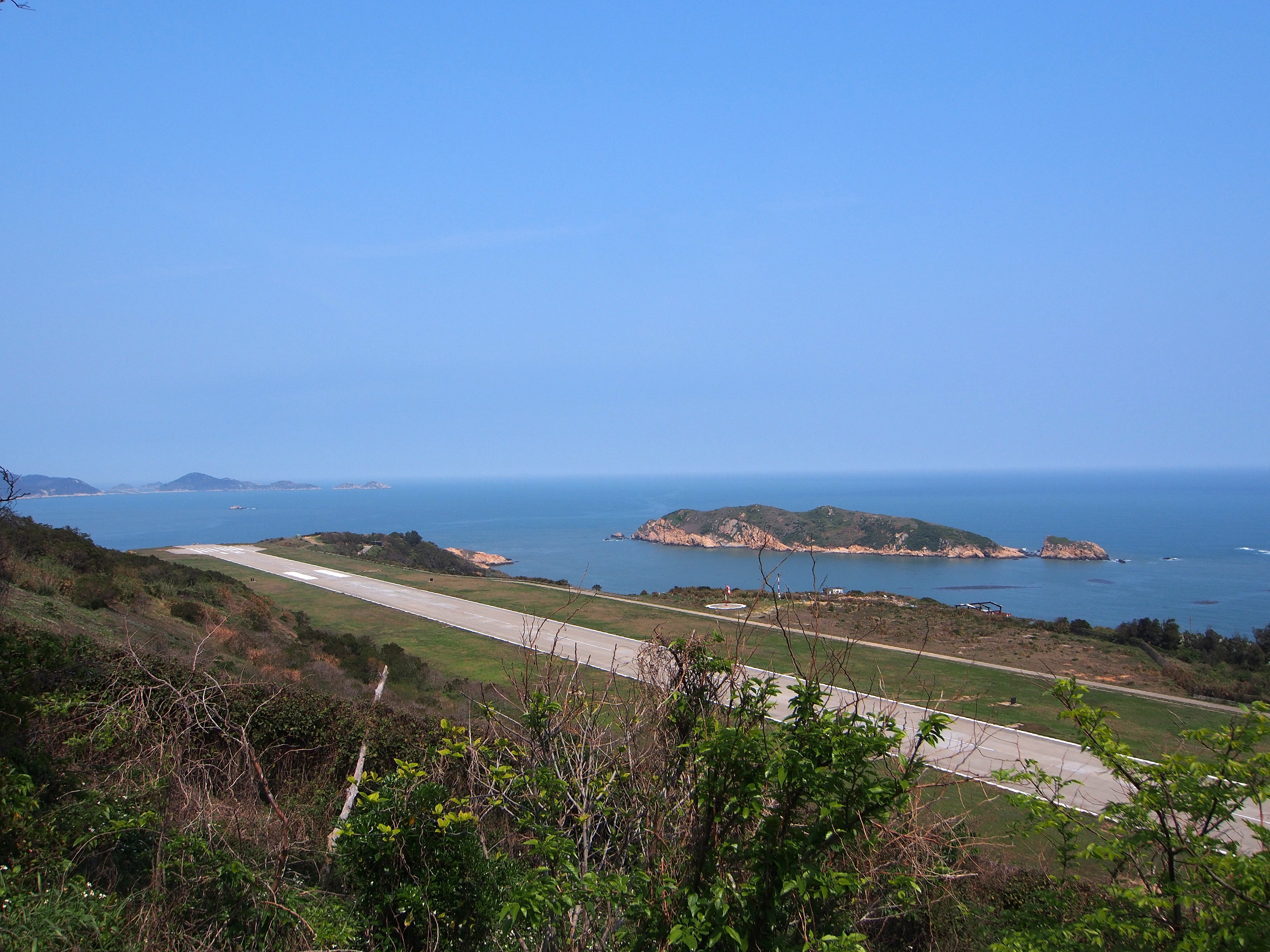
Huangguan Yu (黃官嶼)

Other islets in Nangan Township include Huangguan Yu (黃官嶼), Xie Jiao (鞋礁), Beiquan Jiao (北泉礁), and Liuquan Jiao (劉泉礁).

== Politics and government ==
=== Administrative divisions ===
There are 10 villages on Nangan. At the eastern end of the island is Jieshou (介壽村), the seat of the county government and the largest village. Following the coastal road west from Jieshou, there are Fuxing (復興村), Fuao (福澳村), Qingshui (清水村), Zhuluo (珠螺村) and Mazu (馬祖村). Following the mountain road west, there are Meishi (梅石村), Renai (仁愛村) and Jinsha (津沙聚落), before once again reaching Mazu. Located to the north of Mazu is Siwei (四維村). In addition to these, there are two smaller villages or clusters of homes. These are Furen (夫人村) and Ketiao (科蹄澳), they are located near Siwei.

Many villages on Nangan have two names. In some cases, this was the result of politics, as one is the traditional name and the second has a political connotation. These instances are paired as follows with the traditional name first: Shanlong (山隴): Jieshou (介壽), Niujiao (牛角(聚落)): Fuxing (復興), Tieban (鐵板): Renai (仁愛), and Fuao (福澳): Jingze (經澤). These names are often used interchangeably by residents, except for Jingze. Residents objected to this latter name, and so it never came into popular use. The reference to Shanlong is also important as there is a neighborhood there called Zhonglong (中隴). Mazu is also referred to as Magang (馬港) and Siwei as Xiwei (西尾). As for Mazu and Magang, Magang is the preferred name. This could be in order to distinguish the village and its harbor from Mazu (媽祖), the goddess, and Mazu (馬祖) the island chain. Xiwei was derived from the local Fuzhou dialect's pronunciation of Siwei.

The nine rural villages of Nangan Township are:

- Jieshou (Chiehshou; Chinese: 介壽村; Hanyu Pinyin: Jièshòu Cūn; Tongyong Pinyin: Jièshòu Cun) literally, "Longevity for Chiang Kai-shek "
- Jinsha (Chinsha; Chinese: 津沙村; Hanyu Pinyin: Jīnshā Cūn; Tongyong Pinyin: Jinsha Cun) "Sand of Seaport"
- Cingshuei / Qingshui (Chingshui; Chinese: 清水村; Hanyu Pinyin: Qīngshuǐ Cūn; Tongyong Pinyin: Cingshuěi Cun) "Pure Water"
- Jhuluo (Chuluo; Chinese: 珠螺村; Hanyu Pinyin: Zhūluó Cūn; Tongyong Pinyin: Jhuluó Cun) "Pearl and Snail"
- Fusing / Fuxing (Fuhsing; Chinese: 復興村; Hanyu Pinyin: Fùxīng Cūn; Tongyong Pinyin: Fùsing Cun) "Revive Prosperity"
- Fuwo (Chinese: 福沃村; Hanyu Pinyin: Fúwò Cūn; Tongyong Pinyin: Fúwò Cun) "Auspicious Fertility": Jingze Village (經澤)
- Ren-ai (Jenai; Chinese: 仁愛村; Hanyu Pinyin: Rén'ài Cūn; Tongyong Pinyin: Rén-ài Cun) "Humanity and Love": Tieban (鐵板 "Iron Plate") until 1955 .
- Matsu (Chinese: 馬祖村; Hanyu Pinyin: Mǎzǔ Cūn; Tongyong Pinyin: Mǎzǔ Cun; Wade–Giles: Ma^{3}-tsu^{3} Ts'un^{1}) "Matsu"
- Sihwei / Siwei (Szuwei; Chinese: 四維村; Hanyu Pinyin: Sìwéi Cūn; Tongyong Pinyin: Sìhwéi Cun) "Four Virtues"

=== Government institutions ===
- Lienchiang County Government
- Lienchiang County Council

=== Mayors ===
- Appointed mayors
1. Li Chun-Hua (李春華) (to Nov. 2, 1959)
2. Nieh Ko-Tung (聶國棟) (Nov. 2, 1959-Nov. 15, 1960)
3. Pan Fu (潘輔) (Nov. 15, 1960-Feb. 10, 1962), later mayor of Beigan
4. Yu Te-Chu (尤德渠) (Feb. 10, 1962-Apr. 1, 1962), also mayor of Beigan
5. Hsueh Chih-Lien (薛繼廉) (Apr. 1, 1962-Feb. 25, 1965), later mayor of Juguang
6. Pan Fu (second term, 潘輔) (Feb. 25, 1965-Dec. 7, 1973)
7. Chen I-Peng (陳一鵬) (Dec. 7, 1973-Jan. 1, 1978), former mayor of Beigan and Juguang
- Elected mayors
1. Yeh Chin-Fu (葉金福) (Jan. 1, 1978-Mar. 1, 1982)
2. Chang Hsiang-Shou (張祥壽) (Mar. 1, 1982-Mar. 1, 1986)
3. Chiu Ying-Piao (邱英鑣) (Mar. 1, 1986-Mar. 1, 1990)
4. Chen Shu-Li (陳書禮) (Mar. 1, 1990-Mar. 1, 1998)
5. Chen Hsiu-Hua (陳秀華) (Mar. 1, 1998-Mar. 1, 2002)
6. Lin Shu-Ching (林樹清) (Mar. 1, 2002-Mar. 1, 2006)
7. Chu Hsiu-Ping (朱秀平) (Mar. 1, 2006-Dec. 12, 2014)
8. Chen Chen-Ko (陳振國) (2014–present) (KMT), in 2018 received nearly four-thousand votes

== Tourism ==
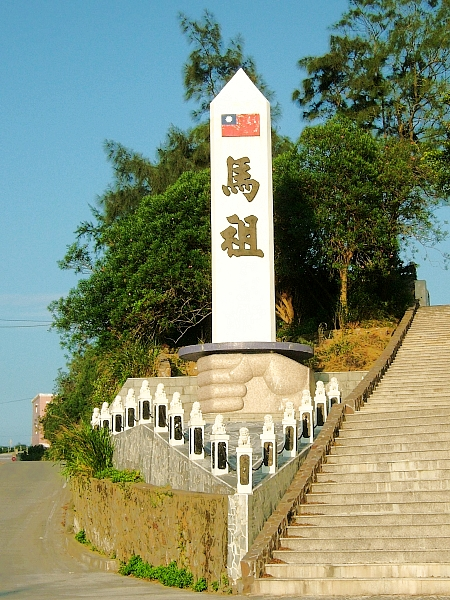
Sword of Matsu Monument

The Palace of Heavenly Empress (天后宮) in Matsu Village contains the coffin of Lin Moniang. The temple also contains statues of the guards, Thousand-li Eye (千里眼) and Wind-following Ear (順風耳). There is an annual celebration on March 3.

Matsu Distillery on Wujiao Hill (午角嶺) in Fusing Village produces daqu wine (大麴酒) and sorghum wine (高梁酒).

Shengli Water Reservoir (勝利水庫 "Victory") and a museum are located in Cingshuei village. The museum contains four cannons from Jyuguang which were used to guide boats. Another museum is the Matsu Blue Tears Ecological Museum, Matsu Folk Culture Museum and Ching-kuo Memorial Hall.

There are two abandoned military tunnels on the island: Tunnel 88 and Beihai Tunnel. Former military stronghold is Dahan Stronghold.

Nature in the township is Shengtian Park and Mount Yuntai.

== Infrastructure ==
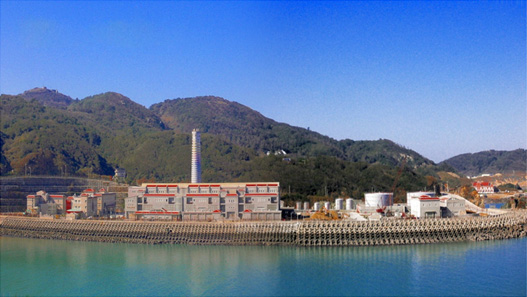
Zhushan Power Plant

Nangan was initially powered by Matsu Power Plant which was funded by the Ministry of National Defense, Taiwan Power Company and the Matsu Administration Committee in 1969 and was commissioned on 1 July 1971. Starting March 2010, the electricity for the township is supplied by Zhushan Power Plant.

The main hospital of the township is Lienchiang County Hospital.

== Transportation ==
=== Air ===
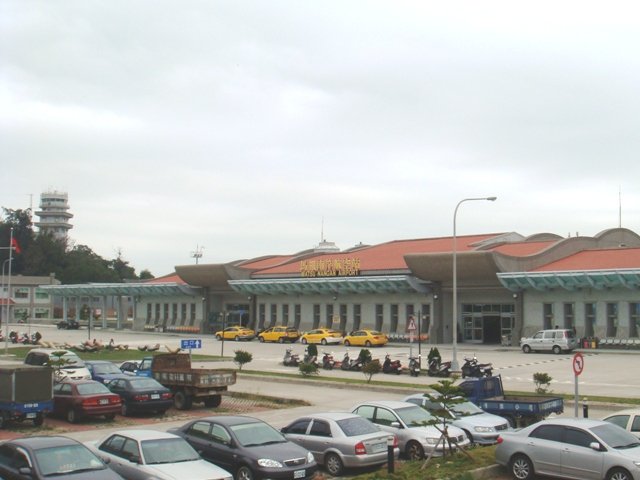
Matsu Nangan Airport

- Uni Air is the only airline serving the island, with eight flights a day to Nangan Airport and three flights a day to Beigan Airport. All of the above flights arrive at Songshan Airport in Taipei with the exception of one flight at Taichung Airport in Taichung.

=== Water ===
- Commercial boat rides are provided hourly every day from 7am to 5pm. The rides take approximately 10 minutes to Beigan.
- Commercial boat rides to Juguang Island takes approximately an hour with three rides a day.
- There are ferryboat scheduled on a weekly basis between Keelung Port and Nangan's Fuao Harbor.

=== Road ===
The township has bus services connecting its villages, which consists of coastal line and mountain line.

== Education ==
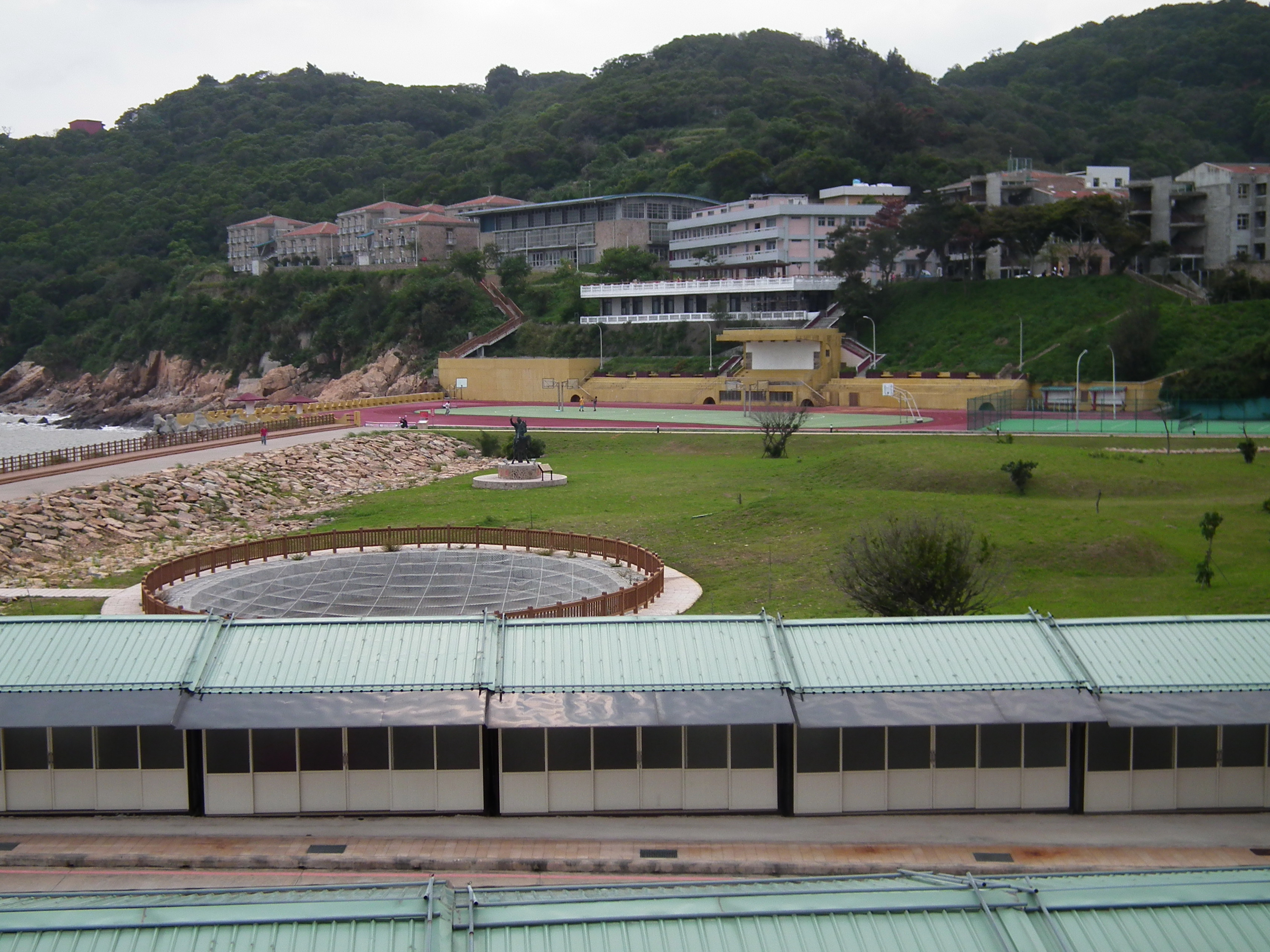
National Matsu Senior High School

Schools in Nangan include:

- National Matsu Senior High School (國立馬祖高級中學) - operated by the national government

Operated by the county government

- Lienchiang County Nangan County Chung Cheng Junior High & Elementary School (連江縣南竿鄉立中正國民中小學)
- Lienchiang County Jie-Shou Junior High & Elementary School (連江縣立介壽國民中小學)
- Lienchiang County Ren Ai Elementary School (連江縣南竿鄉仁愛國民小學)
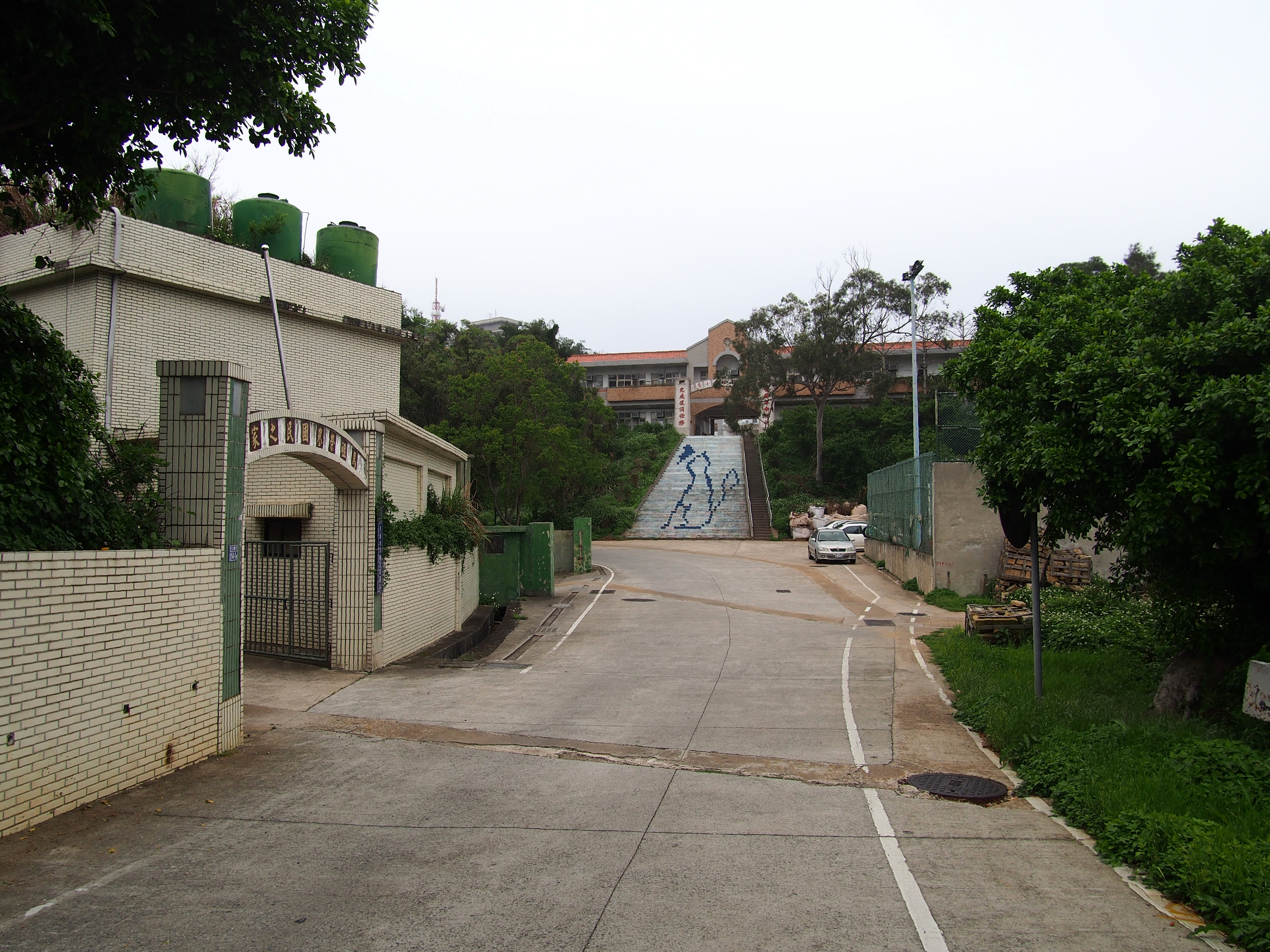
Jie-Shou Junior High & Elementary School (連江縣立介壽國民中小學)

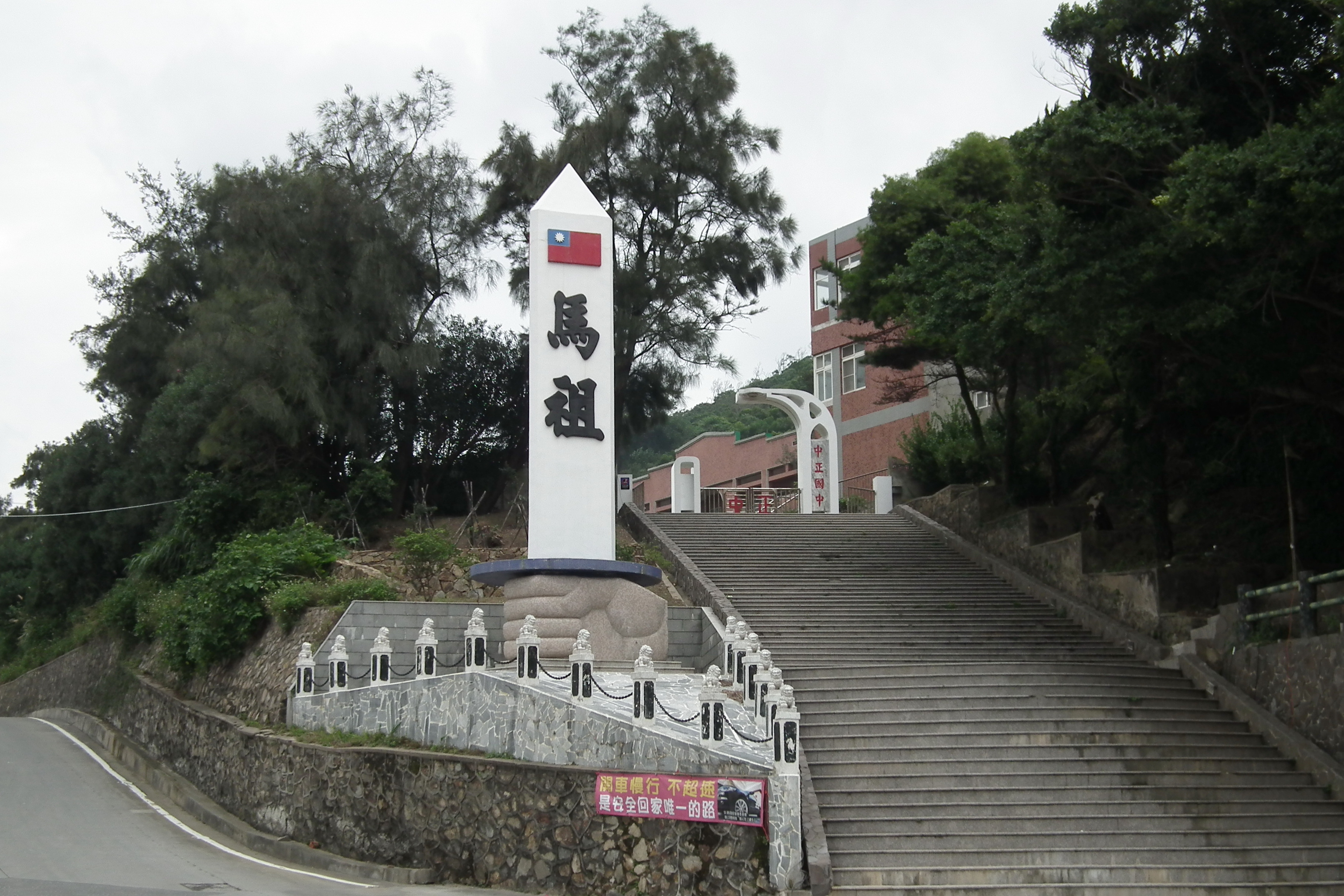
Lienchiang County Nangan County Chung Cheng Junior High & Elementary School (連江縣南竿鄉立中正國民中小學)

== Notable natives ==
- Yang Sui-sheng, Magistrate of Lienchiang County (2009–2014)

== See also ==
- Jinbanjing Tianhou Temple
- List of islands of Taiwan
- List of islands in the East China Sea
