= Matsu Islands =

Offshore archipelago governed by the Republic of China (Taiwan)

Matsu Islands 馬祖列島
- County
- Lienchiang County 連江縣
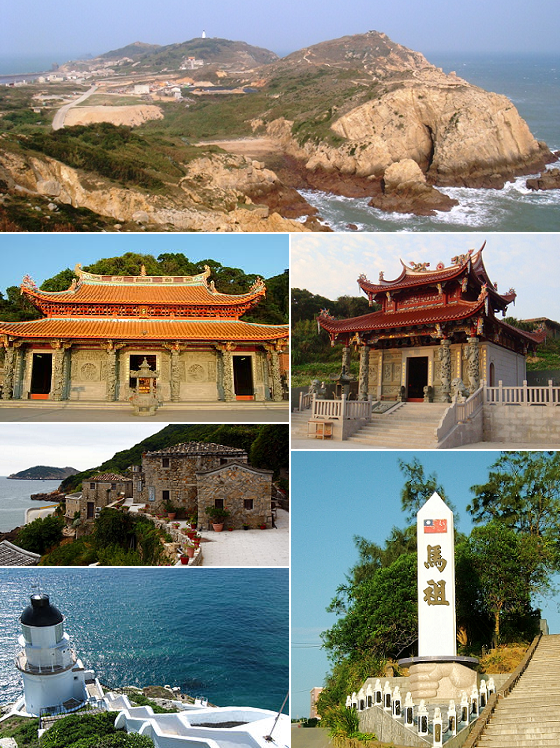
- Top: Magan Tianhou Temple in Nangan, Bottom right: Matsu display monument in Nangan, Bottom upper left: Lin Moniang Tomb in Mazu Temple, Bottom lower left: Dongyong Lighthouse

- Flag Emblem Logo

- Interactive map of Matsu Islands
- Country: Republic of China (Note: Sovereignty disputed by the People's Republic of China. See also Chinese legitimacy question and Political status of Taiwan.)
- Province: Fuchien (Note: Provinces remain a nominal division according to the Taiwanese constitution, but are no longer considered to have any administrative function practically.)
- Seat: Nangan Township (Nankan)
- Divisions: 4 rural townships 22 rural villages

Government
  - Body: Lienchiang County Government; Lienchiang County Council
  - County Magistrate: Wang Chung-ming (KMT)

Area
  - Total: 29.60 km^{2} (11.43 sq mi)
  - Rank: 22 of 22

Population (June 2016)
  - Total: 12,716
  - Rank: 22 of 22
  - Density: 429.6/km^{2} (1,113/sq mi)
- Demonym: Matsunese
- Time zone: UTC+08:00 (NST)
- ISO 3166 code: TW-LIE
- Website: Matsu.gov.tw
- Symbols
- Bird: Chinese crested tern (Sterna bernsteini)
- Flower: Hairy bougainvillea (Bougainvillea glabra)
- Tree: Australian laurel (Pittosporum tobira)
- Interactive map of Matsu Islands
- Coastline: 133 km (82.6 mi)

Matsu Islands
- Traditional Chinese: 馬祖列島
- Simplified Chinese: 马祖列岛
- Literal meaning: Matsu Islands
Transcriptions
Standard Mandarin
- Hanyu Pinyin: Mǎzǔ Lièdǎo
- Bopomofo: ㄇㄚˇ ㄗㄨˇ ㄌㄧㄝˋ ㄉㄠˇ
- Gwoyeu Romatzyh: Maatzuu Liehdao
- Wade–Giles: Ma³-tsu³ Lieh⁴-tao³
- Tongyong Pinyin: Mǎzǔ Lièdǎo
- Yale Romanization: Mǎdzǔ Lyèdǎu
- MPS2: Mǎtzǔ Lièdǎu
- IPA: [mǎ.tsù ljê.tàʊ]
Hakka
- Pha̍k-fa-sṳ: Mâ-chú Lie̍t-tó
Yue: Cantonese
- Jyutping: Ma^{5}-zou^{2}-lit^{6}-dou^{2}
Southern Min
- Hokkien POJ: Má-chó͘ Lia̍t-tó
- Tâi-lô: Má-tsóo Lia̍t-tó
Eastern Min
- Fuzhou BUC: Mā-cū liĕk-dō̤

Lienchiang County
- Traditional Chinese: 連江縣
- Simplified Chinese: 连江县
- Postal: Lienkong Hsien
Transcriptions
Standard Mandarin
- Hanyu Pinyin: Liánjiāng Xiàn
- Bopomofo: ㄌㄧㄢˊ ㄐㄧㄤ ㄒㄧㄢˋ
- Gwoyeu Romatzyh: Lianjiang Shiann
- Wade–Giles: Lien²-chiang¹ Hsien⁴
- Tongyong Pinyin: Liánjiang Siàn
- Yale Romanization: Lyánjyāng Syàn
- MPS2: Liánjiāng Shiàn
- IPA: [ljɛ̌n.tɕjáŋ ɕjɛ̂n]
Hakka
- Pha̍k-fa-sṳ: Lièn-kông-yen
Yue: Cantonese
- Jyutping: Lin^{4}-gong^{1}-jyun^{6}
Southern Min
- Hokkien POJ: Liân-kang-koān
- Tâi-lô: Liân-kang-kuān
Eastern Min
- Fuzhou BUC: Lièng-gŏng-gâing

The Matsu Islands (Note: Chinese: 馬祖列島; pinyin: Mǎzǔ Lièdǎo; Wade–Giles: Ma³-tsu³ Lieh⁴-tao³; Foochow Romanized: Mā-cū liĕk-dō̤) (UK: /ˌmætˈsuː/ or US: /ˌmɑːtˈsuː/) are an archipelago of 36 islands and islets in the East China Sea. They are situated alongside the southeastern coast of mainland China. The archipelago forms Lienchiang County (Note: Chinese: 連江縣; pinyin: Liánjiāng Xiàn; Wade–Giles: Lien²-chiang¹ Hsien⁴; Foochow Romanized: Lièng-gŏng-gâing) (/ljɛnˈdʒjɑːŋ/), the smallest county in the Taiwan Area by area and population, as well as one of two counties that is a part of the nominal Fuchien Province that is administered by the Republic of China.

The current Lienchiang County of the ROC was once part of an intact Lienchiang County of Fujian before its effective partition in 1949 following the Chinese Civil War, which resulted in the mainland portion of the county being controlled by the People's Republic of China (PRC), while the offshore islands of Matsu remained under ROC control. The circumstance has made the county the only former geographical unit with the same name that is now divided between the administrations of the ROC and the PRC.

== Name ==
Lienchiang County, Taiwan (R.O.C.) uses the traditional Chinese characters name (連江縣) and the romanized name Lienchiang which is derived from the Wade–Giles romanization (Lien²-chiang¹) of the Mandarin pronunciation for those Chinese characters that also refer to Lianjiang County, Fuzhou, Fujian in mainland China. Lienchiang has also been written as Lien-chiang and Lienkiang and by a postal romanization of the local language pronunciation Lienkong. The term Lienchiang can also refer to the homophonous Lianjiang in Zhanjiang, Guangdong, China.

The Matsu Islands are named after the main island, Nangan (Nankan). Nangan is also named Matsu Island because of a temple on the island which is supposed to be the burial site of the similarly named goddess Mazu (媽祖). Matsu is the Wade-Giles-derived romanization of the Mandarin pronunciation (Ma³-tsu³) for the Chinese character name (馬祖) of the islands. The Matsu Islands are also known by other Chinese-language names including Chinese: 馬祖群島; pinyin: Mǎzǔ Qúndǎo and 馬祖島; Foochow Romanized: Mā-cū dō̤).

In April 2003, the Lienchiang County government considered changing the name of the county to Matsu County in order to avoid confusion with the nearby Lianjiang County on the mainland. Then-Magistrate Chen Hsueh-sheng said some local people opposed the name change because they felt it reflected the pro-independence viewpoint of the Democratic Progressive Party.

== History ==
=== Yuan dynasty ===
Chinese from Fukien and Chekiang started migrating to the islands during the Yuan dynasty. Most of the people on Matsu came from Houguan (侯官) (today Changle, Fujian). The popular net fishing industry established the base for development of Fuao settlement and industrial development of the region over several hundred years.

=== Ming dynasty ===
Some crewmen of Zheng He temporarily stayed on the islands.

=== Qing dynasty ===
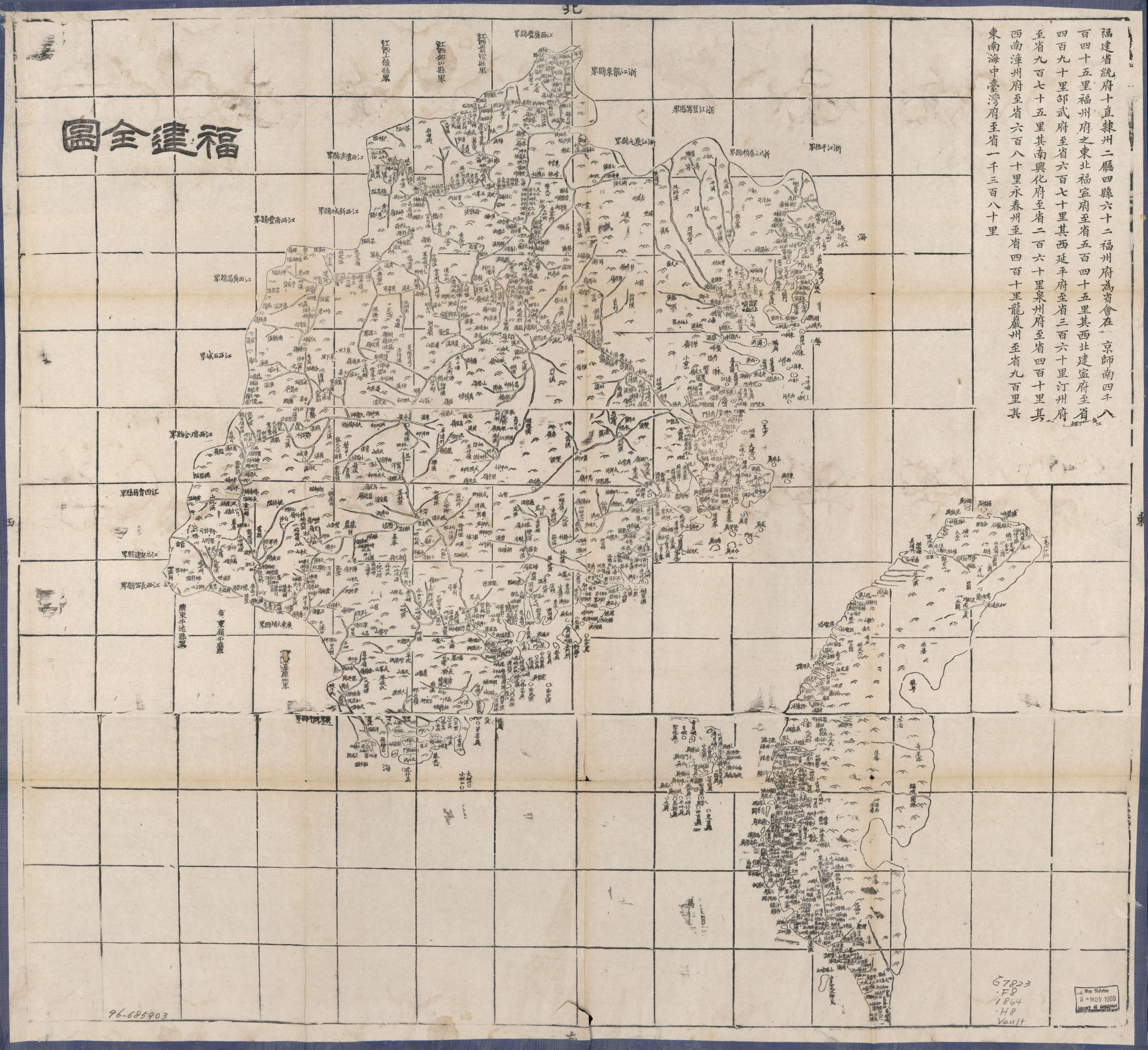
The historical Fujian Province including the Matsu Islands (1864)

During the early Qing dynasty, pirates gathered here and the residents left temporarily. In contrast with Taiwan and Penghu, the Matsu Islands were not ceded to the Empire of Japan via the Treaty of Shimonoseki in 1895. Due to its strategic location along the only route for the spice traffic, the British established the Dongyong Lighthouse in Dongyin Island in 1912 to facilitate ships navigation.

=== Republic of China ===
In 1911, the Qing dynasty was toppled after the Xinhai Revolution on 10 October 1911 and the Republic of China (ROC) was established on 1 January 1912. Matsu Islands were subsequently governed under the administration of Fukien Province of the ROC. On 1 August 1927, the Nanchang Uprising broke out between the ruling Nationalist Party of China (KMT) and Chinese Communist Party (CCP) which marked the beginning of Chinese Civil War.

Sheng-Chang Lin, a graduate student writing for the University of Nottingham Taiwan Studies Programme, noted that in the pre-1949 period, the Matsu Islands did not have a significant relationship with Taiwan, which at the time was a colony of the Empire of Japan. Additionally, he stated that the islands at the time had separate identities and did not have a collective identity as the Matsu Islands. Previous groups of islanders perceived themselves as Fujianese.

On 10 September 1937, Japan occupied Beigan and Nangan via the Collaborationist Chinese Army, making the islands the first in Fujian to fall to Japan. The islands were not occupied by Japanese troops during World War II because they were not important militarily. The Lienchiang County seat was moved to Danyang Township on 19 April 1941 until the Japanese surrender on August 15, 1945.

As a result of the Chinese Civil War, in 1949 the Chinese Communist Party (CCP) took over mainland China from the Chinese Nationalist Party (Kuomintang, KMT). The CCP established the People's Republic of China (PRC) on 1 October 1949, which included administration of today's Lianjiang County of Fujian. The KMT retreated from mainland China to Taiwan at the end of 1949, but retained some of the offshore parts of Lienchiang County (namely, the Matsu Islands), and also most of Kinmen County (Quemoy). On 15 December 1950, the Matsu Administrative Office (馬祖行政公署) of Fujian Province, Republic of China, was established, including modern-day Lienchiang County (the Matsu Islands), as well as several islands in present-day Haidao Township (Xiapu County) and Taishan (台山) (Fuding County) which were lost to the PRC in 1950 and 1951.

In early July 1953, Chinese Nationalist guerillas retreated from islands in the Xiyang Island (Chihchutao) area of present-day Haidao Township (PRC), and the area came under the control of the PRC. In June 1955, the PRC undertook considerable road and military construction around Haitan Island, Pingtan County, Fuzhou, Fujian, China, including roads leading to possible artillery positions on the mainland. Those positions might have been used to protect the Haitan Strait, which was considered a favorable staging area for amphibious operations against the Matsu Islands. In July 1958, the PRC began massing forces opposite Kinmen (Quemoy) and Matsu (Lienchiang) and began bombarding them on 23 August, triggering the Second Taiwan Strait Crisis. On 4 September 1958, the PRC announced the extension of its territorial waters by 20 kilometres (12 miles) to include the two islands. However, later that month, after talks between the United States and the PRC in Warsaw, Poland, a ceasefire was agreed and the status quo reaffirmed.

The phrase "Quemoy and Matsu" became part of American political language in the 1960 U.S. presidential election. During the debates, both candidates, Vice President Richard Nixon and Senator John F. Kennedy, pledged to use American forces if necessary to protect Taiwan from invasion by the PRC, which the United States did not recognize as the legitimate government of China. However, in the second debate on 7 October 1960, the two candidates stated different opinions about whether American forces should also be used to protect Taiwan's forward positions, Quemoy and Matsu. Senator Kennedy stated that these islands — as little as 9 kilometres (5.6 miles) off the coast of Mainland China and as much as 170 kilometres (110 miles) from Taiwan — were strategically indefensible and were not essential to the defense of Taiwan. Vice President Nixon maintained that, since Quemoy and Matsu were in the "area of freedom", they should not, as a matter of principle, be surrendered to the Communists.

Earlier in the debate, Nixon said:

In the Truman Administration 600 million people went behind the Iron Curtain including the satellite countries of Eastern Europe and Communist China. In this Administration we have stopped them at Quemoy and Matsu, we have stopped them in Indo China, we have stopped them in Lebanon, we have stopped them in other parts of the world.

Later in the debate, Edward P. Morgan asked Senator Kennedy:

Senator, Saturday on television, you said that you had always thought that Quemoy and Matsu were unwise places to draw our defense line in the Far East. Would you comment further on that, and also address to this question: couldn't a pull-back from those islands be interpreted as appeasement?

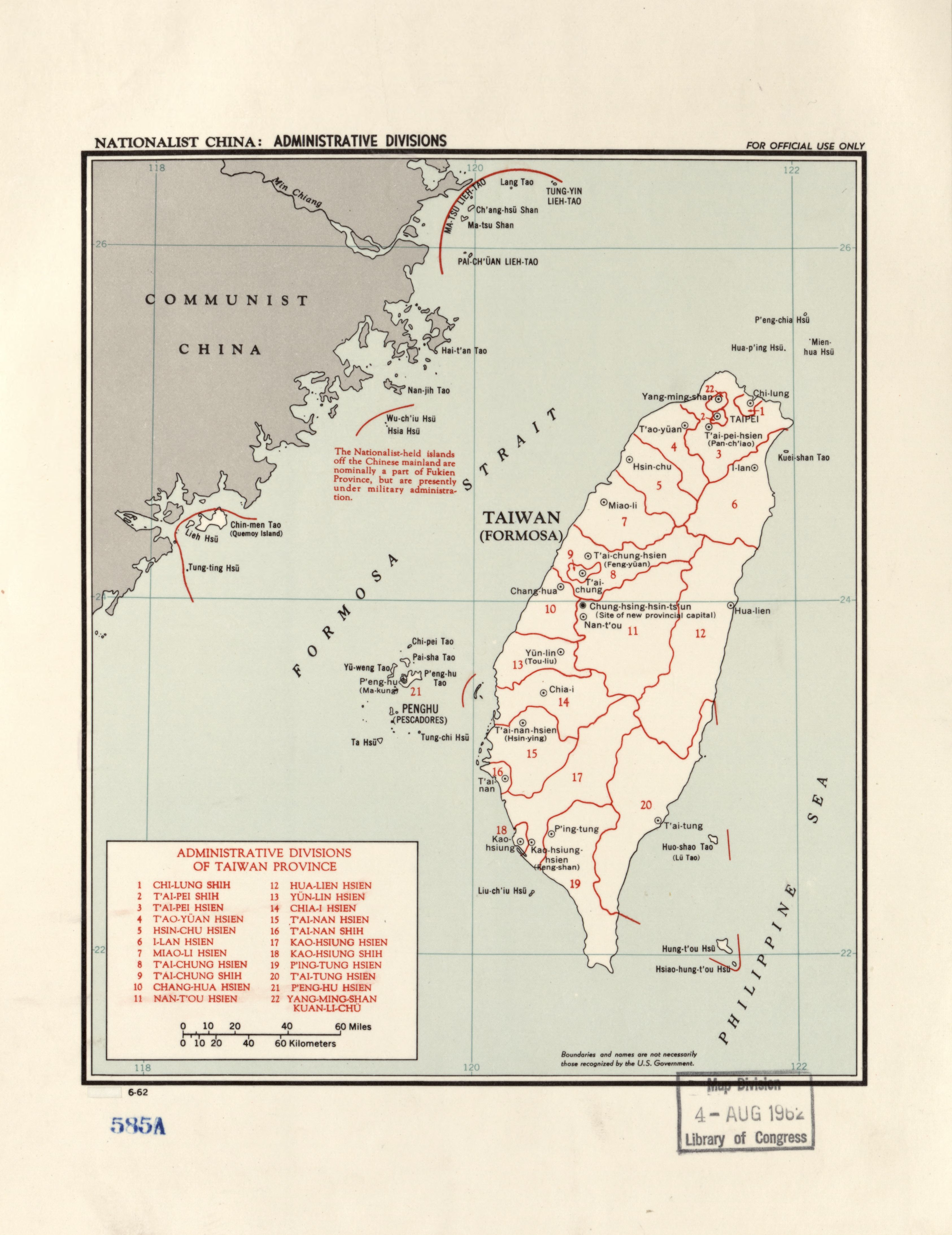
MA-TSU LIEH-TAO (Matsu Islands) including: TUNG-YIN LIEH-TAO (Dongyin), Lang Tao (Liang Island), Ch'ang-hsü Shan (Beigan), Ma-tsu Shan (Nangan), PAI-CH'ÜAN LIEH-TAO (Juguang) "The Nationalist-held islands off the Chinese mainland are nominally a part of Fukien Province, but are presently under military administration." (1962)

Kennedy's response was:

Well, the United States has on occasion attempted, mostly in the middle '50s to persuade Chiang Kai-shek to pull his troops back to Formosa. I believe strongly in the defense of Formosa. These islands are a few miles, five or six miles (Note: Gaodeng Island is 5.75 miles from the Beijiao Peninsula. In Kinmen County, the northern coast of Greater Kinmen (Quemoy) is about five or six miles from the nearest point on mainland Asia in places. Some ROC-controlled areas are closer than five miles from PRC-controlled areas. For instance, Jiaoyu in Dadeng Subdistrict is a little more than one mile from the tip of Greater Kinmen in Jinsha Township.) off the coast of Red China within a general harbor area, and more than a hundred miles (Note: Juguang, Lienchiang and Dongyin, Lienchiang are a little more than ninety miles from the closest point on the main island of Taiwan (Formosa), and Wuqiu, Kinmen is about eighty miles from the closest point. The main islands Nangan (Matsu) and Greater Kinmen (Quemoy) are over one hundred miles from Taiwan Island.) from Formosa. We have never said flatly that we will defend Quemoy and Matsu if it is attacked. We say we will defend it if it's part of a general attack on Formosa, but it is extremely difficult to make that judgment.
Now, Mr. Herter, in 1958, when he was Under Secretary of State, said they were strategically indefensible. Admiral Spruance and Collins in 1955 said that we should not attempt to defend these islands in their conference on the Far East. General Ridgway has said the same thing. I believe that when you get into a war, if you're going to get into a war for the defense of Formosa, it ought to be on a clearly defined line. One of the problems, I think, at the time of South Korea was the question of whether the United States would defend it if it were attacked. I believe that we should defend Formosa, we should come to its defense. It leaves this rather in the air that we will defend it under some conditions but not under others, I think it is a mistake.
Secondly, I would not suggest a withdrawal at the point of the Communist guns. It is a decision finally that the Nationalists should make and I believe that we should consult with them and attempt to work out a plan by which the line is drawn at the Island of Formosa. It leaves 100 miles (Note: The island of Taiwan is separated from the southeast coast of China by the Taiwan Strait, which ranges from 220 km (140 mi) at its widest point to 130 km (81 mi) at its narrowest.) between the sea. But with General Ridgway, Mr. Herter, General Collins, Admiral Spruance and many others, I think it is unwise to take the chance of being dragged into a war which may lead to a world war over two islands which are not strategically defensible, which are not according to their testimony, essential to the defense of Formosa.
I think that we should protect our commitments. I believe strongly we should do so in Berlin. I believe strongly we should do so in Formosa and I believe we should meet our commitments to every country whose security we've guaranteed. But I do not believe that that line, in case of a war, should be drawn on those islands, but instead on the island of Formosa. And as long as they are not essential to the defense of Formosa, it has been my judgement ever since 1954, at the time of the Eisenhower Doctrine for the Far East, that our line should be drawn in the sea around the island itself.

Vice President Nixon retorted:

I disagree completely with Senator Kennedy on this point.
I remember in the period immediately before the Korean War, South Korea was supposed to be indefensible as well. Generals testified to that, and Secretary Acheson made a very famous speech at the Press Club early in the year that the Korean War started, indicating in effect that South Korea was beyond the defense zone of the United States. I suppose it was hoped when he made that speech that we wouldn't get into a war, but it didn't mean that. We had to go in when they came in.
Now I think as far as Quemoy and Matsu are concerned, that the question is not these two little pieces of real estate- they are unimportant. It isn't the few people who live on them- they are not too important. It's the principle involved. These two islands are in the area of freedom. The Nationalists have these two islands. We should not force our Nationalist allies to get off of them and give them to the Communists. If we do that, we start a chain reaction, because the Communists aren't after Quemoy and Matsu, they're after Formosa. In my opinion, this is the same kind of woolly thinking that led to disaster for America in Korea, I'm against it, I would never tolerate it as President of the United States, and I will hope that Senator Kennedy will change his mind if he should be elected.

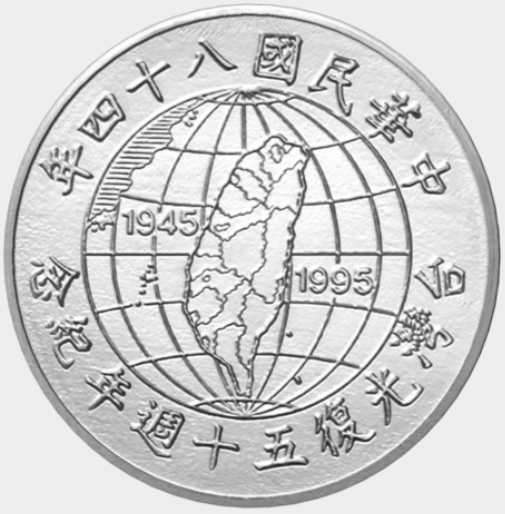
Matsu Islands in the upper left of the map on the obverse of the commemorative NT$10 coin celebrating the 50th anniversary of Taiwan's retrocession

After the third debate on 13 October 1960, Kennedy's advisers spoke with then Secretary of State Herter and said that Kennedy was willing to revise his position on the Quemoy and Matsu issue so as not to give the Communists the impression that the United States would not stand united against aggression. Nixon pointed out the change in Kennedy's position but decided not to press the point due to the importance of the United States' role in what was an extremely tense situation. Polls of Republicans and Democrats showed overwhelming support for Nixon's position.

Sheng-Chang Lin stated that the Matsu Islands gained a collective identity during the Cold War period. Additionally, the islands gained significant relationships to Taiwan, now sharing a government with them. By 2021, younger people identified as being from the Matsu Islands specifically.

Self-governance of the county resumed in 1992, after the cessation of political warfare with the mainland and the abolition of Battle Field Administration on 7 November 1992. Afterwards, local construction picked up pace. In 1999, the islands were designated as the Matsu National Scenic Area Administration. In January 2001, direct cargo and passenger shipping started between Matsu and Fujian Province of the PRC. After 1 January 2015, tourists from mainland China could directly apply the Exit and Entry Permit upon arrival in Matsu Islands. That privilege also applied to Penghu and Kinmen, as a means to boost tourism in the outlying islands of Taiwan. In December 2015, the Huangqi-Matsu ship route was introduced as part of the Mini Three Links.

In 2020, rampant illegal sand mining by Chinese ships in the waters around the Matsu Islands caused concern in the islands and in the Executive Yuan about damage to the marine environment, possible damage to underwater telecommunications cables, and the potential for coastal erosion. Auctioning impounded ships was seen as an easy way for the dredging companies to get their ships back via intermediaries, hence sinking the impounded ships was under consideration.

In 2021, it was reported that hundreds of Chinese squid fishing boats surrounded Matsu, and the lights from the boats to attract the squid lit up the local sky in green at night.

In February 2023, two submarine cables between Matsu and Taiwan island were completely cut, causing Matsu residents' communication services to be affected.

== Geography ==
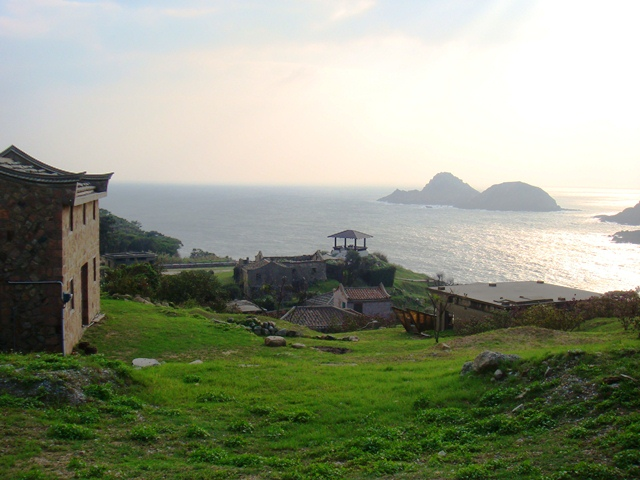
Dongju Island

The Matsu Islands comprise 19 islands and islets, which include five major islands, which are Nangan, Dongju and Xiju (both in Juguang Township), Beigan and Dongyin. Minor islands include Liang Island, Gaodeng Island, Daqiu Island and Xiaoqiu, which are part of Beigan Township. The shortest distance between Huangqi, Lianjiang County and the Matsu Islands is also the shortest distance between China (PRC) administered territory and territory in the ROC (Taiwan)-administered Matsu Islands.

Dongyin is the northernmost and Dongju is the southernmost.

- Dongyin is 100 nautical miles (190 kilometres) from Keelung, Taiwan, 180 to the Penghu islands, and slightly over 10 nautical miles (19 kilometres) from mainland China.
- The soil is not ideal for farming.
- The highest point is on Beigan, 298 metres (978 ft).

Areas:

- Nangan: 10.43 km^{2} (4.03 sq mi)
- Beigan: 8.86 km^{2} (3.42 sq mi)
- Dongyin: 4.35 km^{2} (1.68 sq mi)
- Juguang islands: see Juguang

=== Geology ===
The islands are predominantly composed of Jurassic and Cretaceous intrusive (emplaced ≈160 Ma, ≈130 Ma and ≈94 Ma) granite and diabase.

=== Climate ===
Average annual temperature is 18.6 °C (65.5 °F), with the average low being at 13 °C (55 °F) and average high at 29 °C (84 °F). The daily temperature varies greatly during day and night. The region experiences subtropical maritime climate (Cfa according to the Köppen climate classification), which is influenced by monsoon and ocean currents and its geographic location. Matsu has four seasons: during winter it is cold, cloudy, and wet, during summer and spring it is foggy, and during autumn the weather is generally stable.

Climate data for Matsu Islands (Nangan) (2005–2020 normals, extremes 2004–present)
Month	Jan	Feb	Mar	Apr	May	Jun	Jul	Aug	Sep	Oct	Nov	Dec	Year
Record high °C (°F)	24.2 (75.6)	25.7 (78.3)	28.1 (82.6)	29.4 (84.9)	32.7 (90.9)	34.1 (93.4)	35.1 (95.2)	36.3 (97.3)	36.6 (97.9)	32.4 (90.3)	28.9 (84.0)	24.1 (75.4)	36.6 (97.9)
Mean daily maximum °C (°F)	12.8 (55.0)	13.3 (55.9)	16.1 (61.0)	20.6 (69.1)	24.6 (76.3)	27.8 (82.0)	30.8 (87.4)	31.4 (88.5)	29.2 (84.6)	25.0 (77.0)	20.6 (69.1)	15.5 (59.9)	22.3 (72.2)
Daily mean °C (°F)	10.6 (51.1)	10.6 (51.1)	12.8 (55.0)	17.1 (62.8)	21.5 (70.7)	25.2 (77.4)	27.8 (82.0)	28.0 (82.4)	26.4 (79.5)	22.7 (72.9)	18.4 (65.1)	13.3 (55.9)	19.5 (67.2)
Mean daily minimum °C (°F)	8.8 (47.8)	8.5 (47.3)	10.3 (50.5)	14.4 (57.9)	19.1 (66.4)	23.1 (73.6)	25.6 (78.1)	25.8 (78.4)	24.4 (75.9)	20.8 (69.4)	16.6 (61.9)	11.4 (52.5)	17.4 (63.3)
Record low °C (°F)	0.3 (32.5)	2.1 (35.8)	1.5 (34.7)	7.3 (45.1)	12.0 (53.6)	16.4 (61.5)	21.0 (69.8)	22.0 (71.6)	18.3 (64.9)	13.7 (56.7)	8.9 (48.0)	3.2 (37.8)	0.3 (32.5)
Average precipitation mm (inches)	50.2 (1.98)	74.5 (2.93)	107.6 (4.24)	117.4 (4.62)	144.8 (5.70)	181.9 (7.16)	104.2 (4.10)	117.1 (4.61)	94.1 (3.70)	38.2 (1.50)	64.4 (2.54)	46.0 (1.81)	1,140.4 (44.89)
Average precipitation days	8.3	11.4	14.6	13.6	15.5	13.5	6.1	9.9	9.6	6.0	8.5	7.3	124.3
Average relative humidity (%)	80.8	84.2	83.1	83.9	86.9	88.0	85.8	86.4	82.4	76.6	80.4	77.7	83.0
Mean monthly sunshine hours	90.3	73.4	107.6	120.7	120.1	146.0	258.8	235.0	171.4	160.3	101.2	108.7	1,693.5
Source: Central Weather Bureau

== Politics and government ==
Townships of Lienchiang County

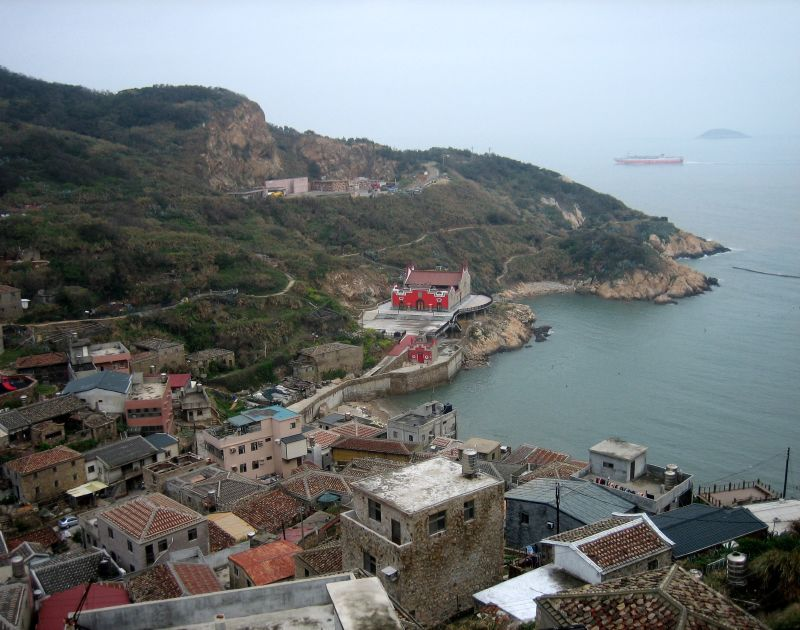
Nangan Township, the seat of Lienchiang County

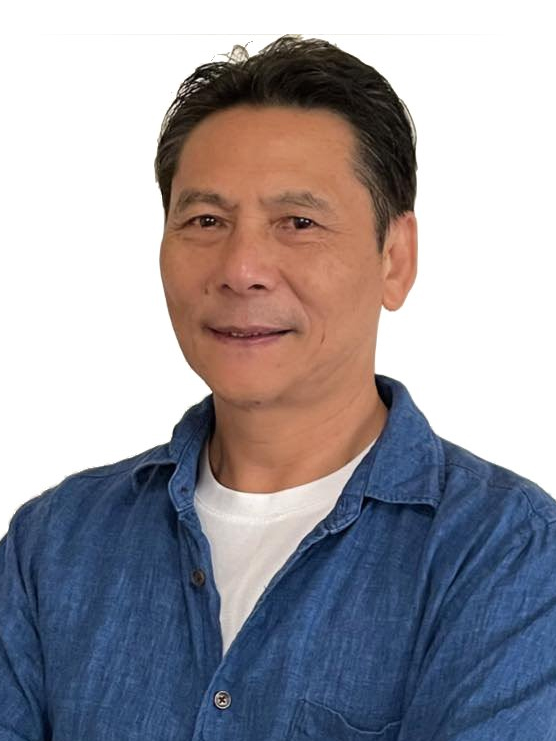
Wang Chung-ming, the incumbent Magistrate of Lienchiang County

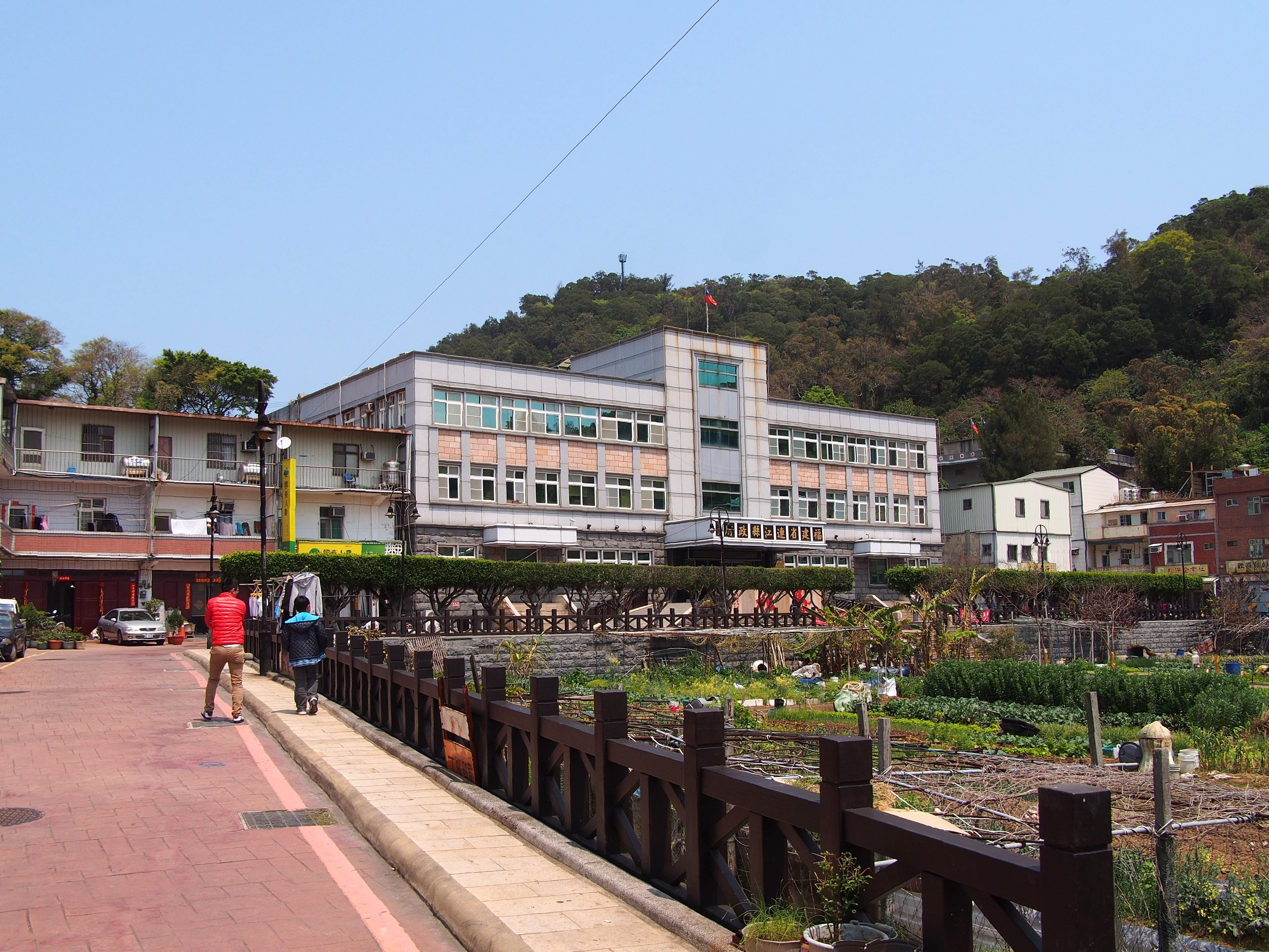
Lienchiang County Government

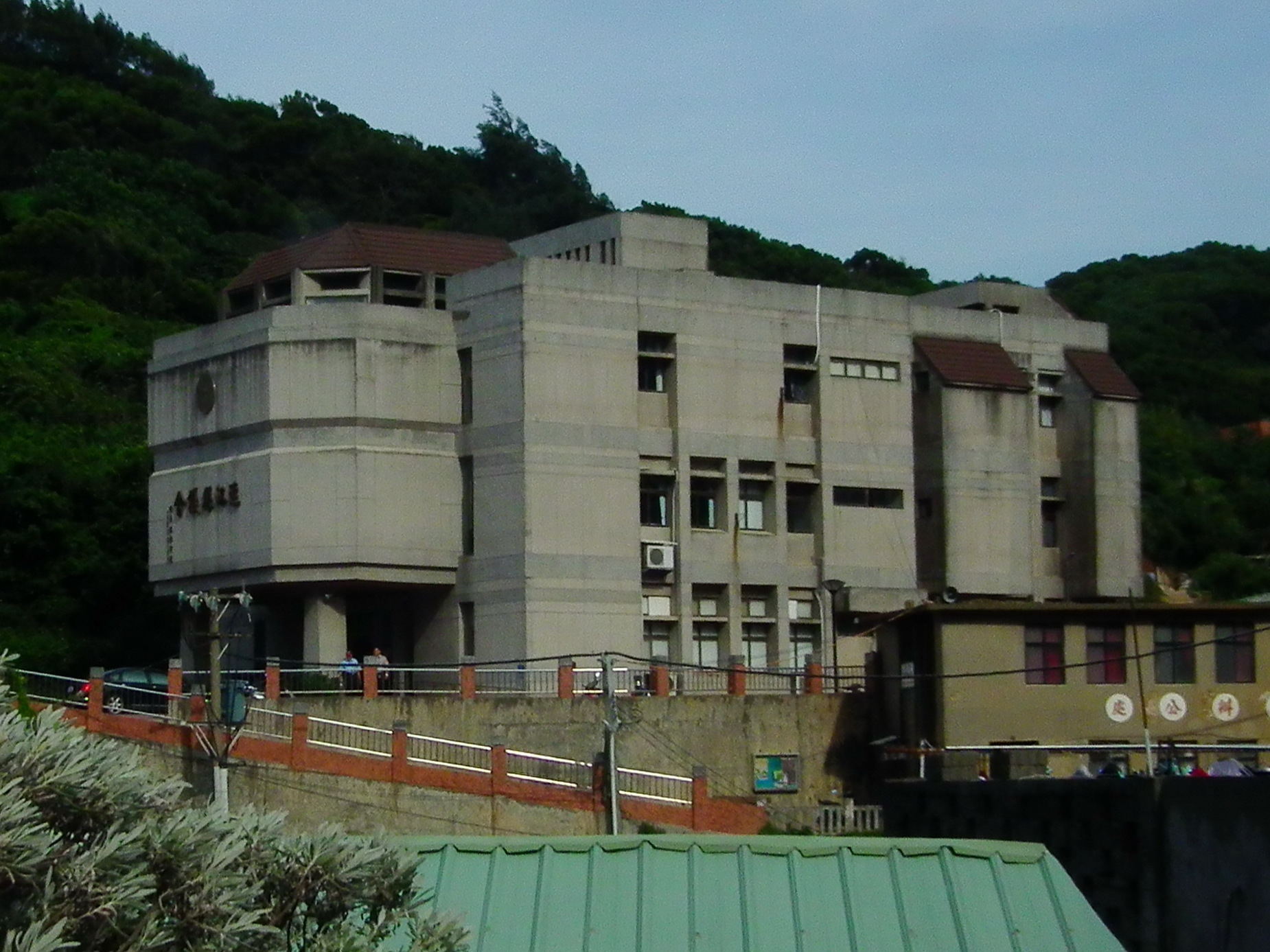
Lienchiang County Council

The Matsu Islands are administered as Lienchiang County under the Fujian Provincial Government. Nangan Township is the county seat which houses the Lienchiang County Government and Lienchiang County Council. The county is headed by a magistrate, elected every four years in the ROC local elections. The incumbent magistrate is Wang Chung-ming of Kuomintang. The Lienchiang County Council seat is dominated by Kuomintang legislators.

=== Administrative divisions ===
Lienchiang County is divided into four rural townships. It is further divided into 22 villages and 137 neighborhoods (鄰). Lienchiang County is the only county in Taiwan which does not have a city or an urban township. The county seat is Nangan Township (Nankan).

Name	Chinese	Wade–Giles	Pinyin	Foochow Romanized
Rural townships
Beigan Township	北竿鄉	Pei³-kan¹ Hsiang¹	Běigān Xiāng	Báe̤k-găng Hiŏng
Dongyin Township	東引鄉	Tung¹-yin³ Hsiang¹	Dōngyǐn Xiāng	Dĕ̤ng-īng Hiŏng
Juguang Township	莒光鄉	Chü³-kuang¹ Hsiang¹	Jǔguāng Xiāng	Gṳ̄-guŏng Hiŏng
Nangan Township	南竿鄉	Nan²-kan¹ Hsiang¹	Nángān Xiāng	Nàng-găng Hiŏng

All the townships administer more than one island.

=== Magistrates ===
Before 1993, county magistrates were appointed.

- Elected magistrates
1. Tsao Chang-Shun (曹常順) (1993–1997) (KMT)
2. Liu Li-Chun (劉立群) (1997–2001) (KMT)
3. Chen Hsueh-sheng, also the current national representative of Matsu. (2001–2009) (PFP, later KMT)
4. Yang Sui-sheng (2009–2014) (KMT)
5. Liu Cheng-ying (2014–2022) (KMT)
6. Wang Chung-ming (2022–present) (KMT)

=== Military ===
The Matsu Islands are protected by the ROC Army Matsu Defense Command.

=== Politics ===
Lienchang County voted one Kuomintang legislator out of one seat to be in the Legislative Yuan during the 2016 Republic of China legislative election. While the Democratic Progressive Party have had difficulty winning a county-level election in this area, most of the competitions are among local strategies. In 2018, a Green Party member, Su Bo Hao attempted to run for magistrate but failed.

=== Cross-Strait relations ===
The historical Lienchiang County roughly included the northern three townships of today's Matsu Islands (Lienchiang County) and the area of today's Lianjiang County of the People's Republic of China (PRC). The PRC claims the three northern townships of the Matsu Islands as Matsu Township (馬祖鄉; Mǎzǔ Xiāng; Mā-cū hiŏng) and the Juguang Islands (the southernmost islands, formerly named the Baiquan Islands) as part of Changle District.

Vessels from the Taiwan's Coast Guard Administration (CGA) have confronted sand dredging by Chinese vessels near the Matsu Islands. This dredging activity began in 2018. Since March 2019, the Lienchiang Cross-Strait Matters Forum started as an official forum between Lienchiang County of the Republic of China (Taiwan) and Lianjiang County of the People's Republic of China to discuss matters regarding the two sides.

== Demographics and culture ==
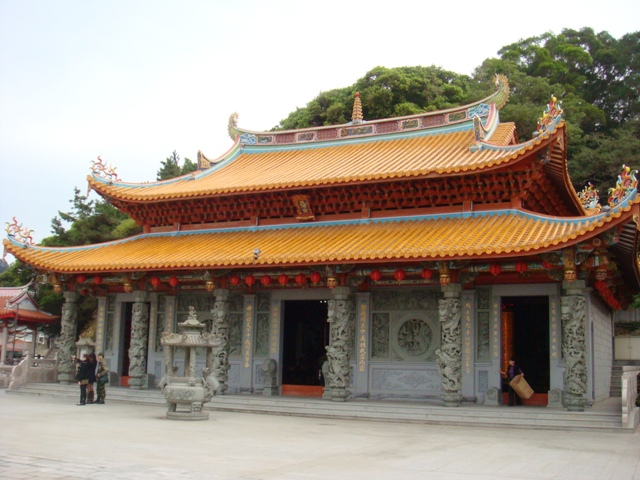
Matsu Nangan Tianhou Temple

Historical population
Year	Pop.	±%
1956	10,964	—
1960	12,923	+17.9%
1965	15,374	+19.0%
1970	16,939	+10.2%
1975	13,719	−19.0%
1980	9,058	−34.0%
1985	6,926	−23.5%
1990	5,585	−19.4%
1995	5,856	+4.9%
2000	6,733	+15.0%
2005	9,786	+45.3%
2010	9,944	+1.6%
2015	12,547	+26.2%
2020	13,279	+5.8%
2025	13,621	+2.6%
Source: 1. "縣市人口按性別及五齡組" (in Chinese (Taiwan)). 內政部戶政司.; 2. 劉, 家國; 李, 仕德; 林, 金炎, eds. (Dec 2014). "附表:本縣歷年人口統計表". 《連江縣志》第五冊 (in Chinese (Taiwan)). 連江縣政府. pp. 017~018.

View source data.

=== Population ===
The majority of native Matsu Islands residents originated in Northern Fujian. Several of the islands of Matsu are not inhabited permanently. Some of these are garrisoned by soldiers from the Republic of China Armed Forces stationed in the county since the end of the Chinese Civil War in 1949 and during the First and Second Taiwan Strait Crisis in 1954 and 1958 respectively. Due to that high military demand large numbers of military personnel stationed on the islands produced unprecedented population growth in the county. The population reached its peak in 1971 with a total of 17,088 people. After those periods of high growth the population decreased year after year due to the poor economic growth which resulted in mass youth emigration due to lack of employment opportunities. In recent years the population in the county has gradually increased because of immigration. The population has stabilized due to the improved transportation between Taiwan Island and Matsu Islands as well as mass construction projects.

=== Languages ===
The native language spoken by Matsu residents is the Matsu dialect, a subdialect of the Fuzhou dialect, which is one of the statutory languages for public transport announcements in the Matsu Islands. Mandarin Chinese is one of the official languages of Lienchiang County.

Previously the Eastern Min varieties in the Matsu Islands were seen as a part of general Fujian varieties. The establishment of the People's Republic of China in 1949 severed the Matsu Islands from the rest of Fujian province, and as communications were cut off between the Republic of China (now including Taiwan and without mainland China) and the PRC, the identity of the Matsu Islands specifically became established. Additionally, the varieties of Eastern Min on the Matsu Islands became seen as a Matsu dialect.

=== Name ===
Chen (陳) is the most common surname, then Lin (林), Wang (王), Tsao (曹) and Liu (劉).

=== Belief ===
Matsu (Chinese: 馬祖; pinyin: Mǎzǔ), though named after the goddess Mazu (Chinese: 媽祖; pinyin: Māzǔ), is written with a different character that has a different tone. The Matsu Islands are the location of the deathplace of Mazu (on a seaport named after her on Nangan Island).

The Matsu Nangan Tianhou Temple (馬祖南竿天后宮), a temple dedicated to the goddess, contains the sarcophagus of Lin Moniang. It is, however, not as popular as the Meizhou temple.

Most Taiwanese pilgrims to Meizhou start off their journey in the Matsu Islands because they are the closest ROC-controlled territory to Meizhou, which is controlled by the PRC.

== Economy ==
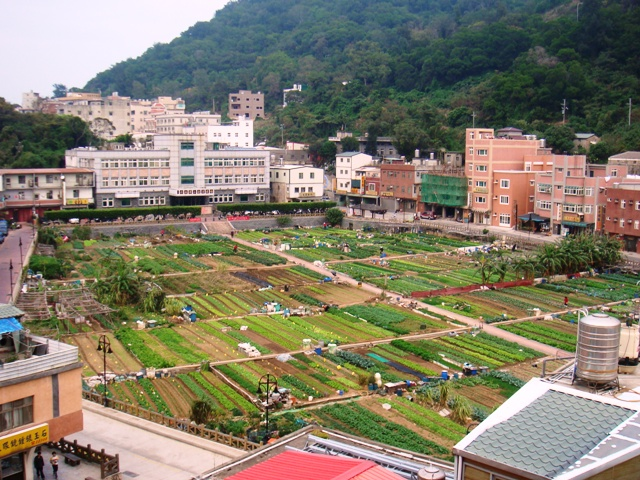
Vegetable farming park in Nangan Township

Due to its geographically remote location, the manufacturing business of Matsu has never been fully developed. Among them, the wine making industry of Matsu Distillery is the most distinguished feature. Tourism has become a highly important feature of the economy.

However, most of its commercial trading focuses on retail businesses and restaurants for stationed military consumption. Farm products of Matsu include rice, sugar cane, tea plant, oranges. Sea animals, such as fish, clams, and jellyfish, are also popular exports due to its nature as the major traditional industry in Matsu. However, the flourishing fishing ground is almost exhausted by arbitrary fish bombing by mainland China fishing boats, while the fish population is decreasing as well.

In July 2012, Matsu residents voted in favor of the establishment of casinos, which led to the prospect of gaming industries in the county and the passing of the Gaming Act (Chinese: 觀光賭場管理條例).

== Infrastructure ==
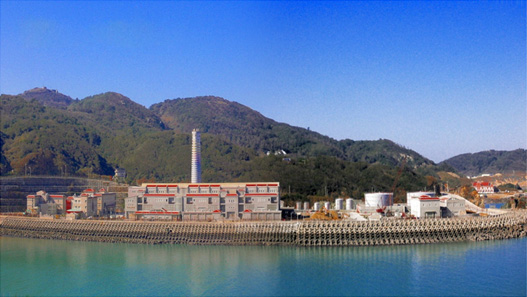
Zhushan Power Plant

=== Power generation ===
On 1 July 1975, the Matsu Power Company was founded to operate all of the power plants in the county. On 1 July 1986, the company was incorporated into Taiwan Power Company. The county is powered up by its fuel-fired (diesel) Zhushan Power Plant located in Cingshuei Village of Nangan Township with a capacity of 15.4 MW commissioned on 22 March 2010. The other power plants are Dongyin Power Plant in Dongyin Township and Dongju Power Plant in Dongju Island and Xiju Power Plant in Xiju Island of Juguang Township. The county is also powered up by its photovoltaic system with a capacity of 0.074 MW.

=== Telecommunication ===
For telecommucation, Matsu Islands is connected via three submarine communications cables named Taima Cables (Chinese: 台馬; pinyin: Táimǎ). To Taiwan Island, the Taima Cable No. 2 connects Dongyin Township in the county to Tamsui District in New Taipei and Taima Cable No. 3 connects Nangan Township to Taoyuan City. As of 2023, the fourth cable is under construction with expected completion date in 2025. The first cable is no longer in use.

=== Pollution ===
Generally, the environment of Matsu Islands is still well-preserved. The major source of pollution is from family and military household waste. There are, however, concerns that the continued lack of modern sewage facilities results in household waste seeping into groundwater.

== Tourism ==
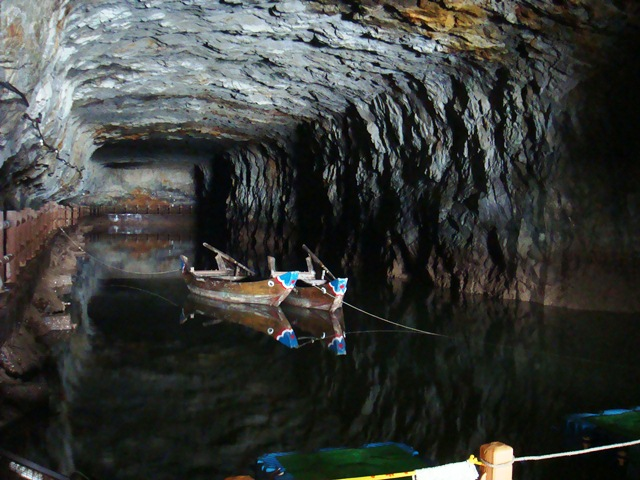
Beihai Tunnel in Nangan Township

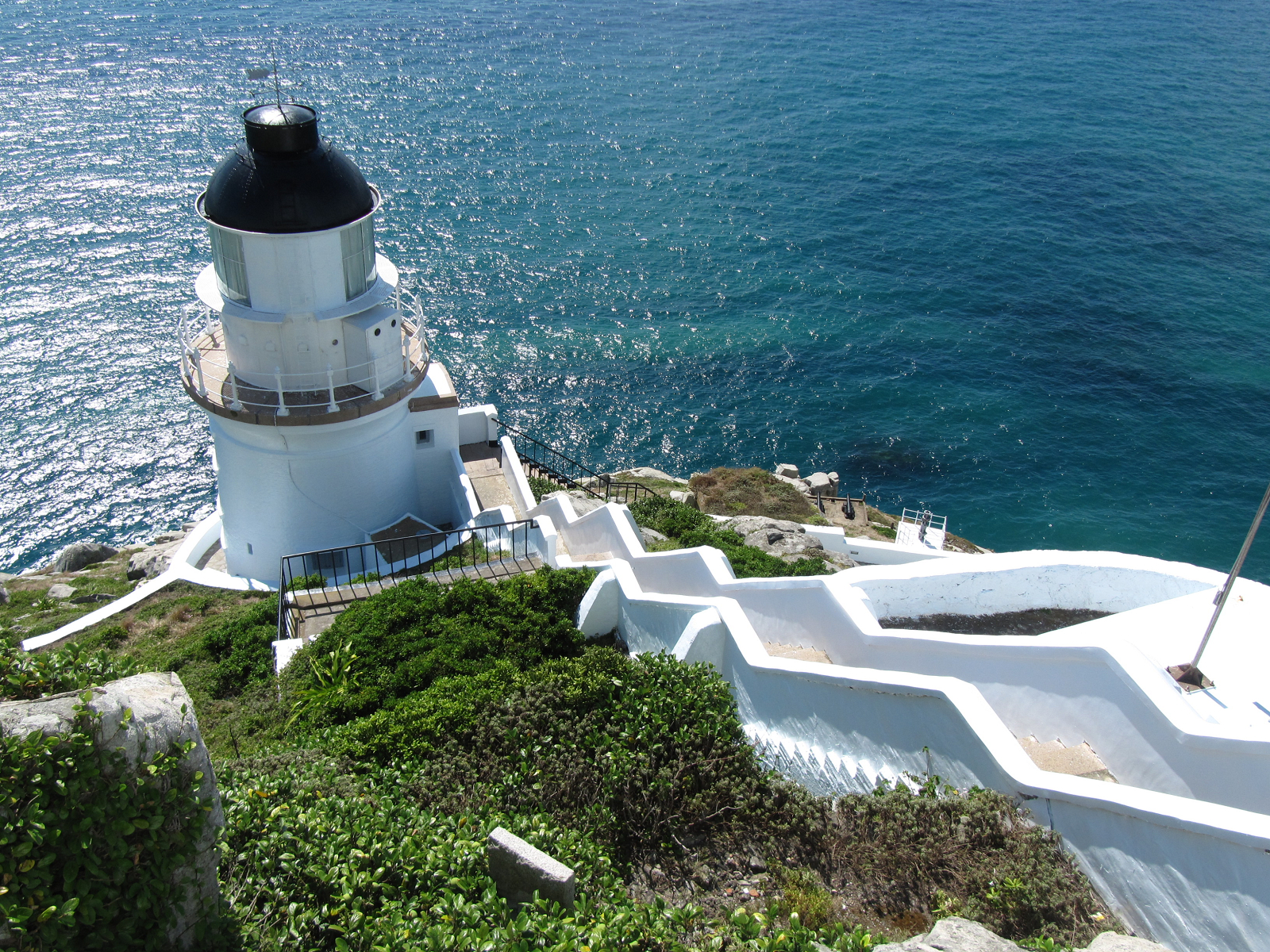
Dongyong Lighthouse

Tourism has become a critical sector in the local economy. Lienchiang County Government is making an effort to attract more visitors to the Matsu Islands, especially among foreigners. Dongyin Visitor Center is the main visitor center of the township.

Nangan is the capital of Matsu and it is noted for its granite tunnel and the Iron Fort. It has two interconnected main roads.

The Beihai Tunnels are manmade granite tunnels. Both tunnels were remarkable for their time, and they took great effort to construct. The tunnel in Nangan was built in 1968. The completion of Beihai Tunnel took the effort of thousands of men. The 700 metres (770 yards) tunnel has a width of 10 metres (33 ft) and a height of 16 metres (52 ft). It was completed in 820 days with shovels, spades and explosives; the tunnel also took the life of a platoon of soldiers. The tunnel was considered a military location and was not opened to the public until 1990.

The Iron Fort is located on the Southwest side of Nangan island. Located by a small cliff, it is a vulnerable spot for outside attacks or illegal smuggling of materials. With that in mind, the fort was built for defence. It is equipped with multiple machinegun rooms and rudimentary living facilities. It is now open to the public, and although most of the equipment has been removed from the site, the site itself brings back a vivid image of what it was like for soldiers at that time.

Museums in Matsu including the Matsu Blue Tears Ecological Museum, Matsu Folk Culture Museum, Ching-kuo Memorial Hall and War and Peace Memorial Park Exhibition Center.

=== Nature ===
Since 1990, the county manages the Matsu Islands Bird Sanctuary, which spreads across eight islands and islets in Nangan, Beigan and Tongyin Townships. It contains 30 species in 15 orders, mostly gulls and terns. In 2000, four pairs of the critically endangered Chinese crested tern, previously thought to be extinct, were discovered nesting on the Matsu Islands, giving them global conservation importance.

There are also mosses and ferns rare or absent elsewhere in the ROC.

Cetacean species that have become rare along Chinese coasts are still present here such as false killer whales and finless porpoises, providing opportunistic observations at times. Finless porpoises in this areas are generally smaller than other subspecies, and it is unique that two subspecies inhabit in this region where Matsu region is the northern limit for one of them.

== Transportation ==
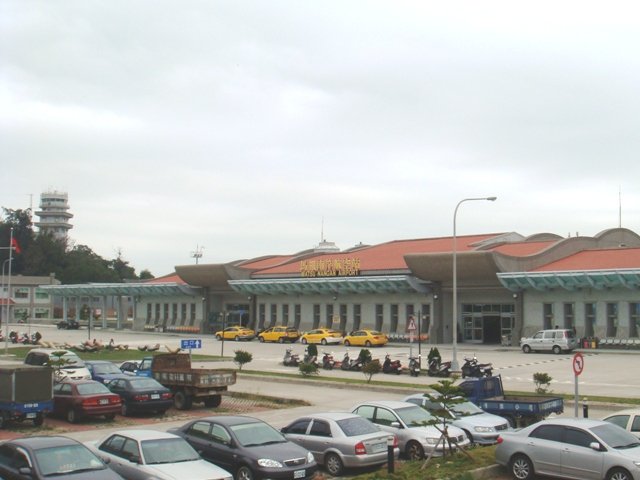
Matsu Nangan Airport

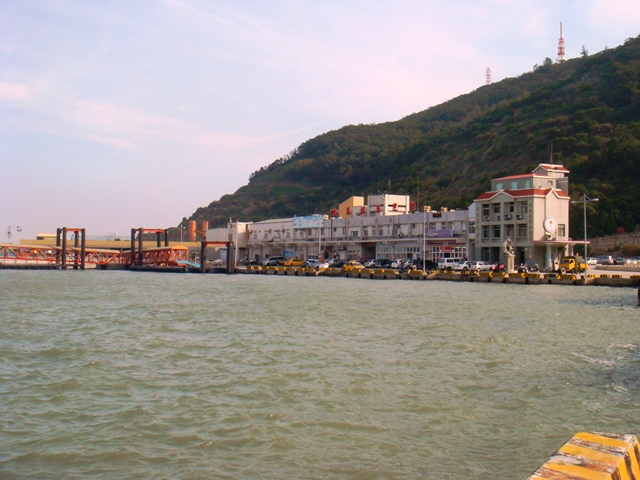
Fuao Harbor

=== Air ===
Both Nangan and Beigan have airports which are the Matsu Nangan Airport and Matsu Beigan Airport respectively. Dongyin and Juguang (in Xiju Island) house heliports which only operate during winter time and priority is given to local residents to travel to Nangan.

=== Sea ===
Due to the main airport being located in Nangan, boats are the main form of transportation between the islands in the county.

Being part of Taiwan the main boat rides depart from Keelung and arrive in Nangan.

There are two ferry rides to mainland China. One arrives at Mawei District of Fuzhou and departs from Fuao Harbor at Nangan Township in which the journey normally takes 90 minutes while in Nangan. Another arrives at Huangqi (黄岐镇) of Lianjiang and departs from Beigan Township in which the journey takes only 20 minutes. Dongyin Township houses the Zhongzhu Harbor.

=== Road ===
Due to their size, travelling by motorized scooter is an ideal way to get around the main islands such as Nangan and Beigan, despite the steep hills. Both Islands have regular buses, and taxis are also economical. In October 2019, mainland China announced 'initial plans' to build a bridge linking Fuzhou to the Matsu Islands. Taiwan's Mainland Affairs Council (MAC) said that the plans were made unilaterally by Mainland's Fujian as part of its schemes to absorb Taiwan and divide Taiwanese society and that they see no need for bridges linking either Matsu or Kinmen to mainland China. Legislators representing Matsu have said that their thinking is different from the Mainland Affairs Council, and that they were optimistic about the idea of a bridge.

== Notable persons ==
- Chen Pao-yu, Chief of Staff of the Republic of China Army (2019-)

== See also ==
- Hong Kong (a special administrative region in China)
- Macau (a special administrative region in China)
- Kinmen
- Matsu Daily
- Lianjiang County (located in mainland China)
- Administrative divisions of the Republic of China
- List of Taiwanese superlatives
- List of cities in the Republic of China
- List of islands of the Republic of China
