= Fuchien Provincial Government =

Government of Fuchien Province, Republic of China

- 福建省政府; Fújiàn Shěng Zhèngfǔ (Mandarin); Fuk-kien Sén Chṳn-fú (Hakka)
- Seal of Fuchien Province

Agency overview
- Formed: 21 May 1927
- Dissolved: 1 January 2019 (de facto)
- Superseding agency: Kinmen-Matsu Joint Services Center Fujian Provincial People's Government (mainland only)
- Jurisdiction: Fuchien Province (Kinmen and Matsu)
- Parent agency: Executive Yuan

Fuchien Provincial Government
- Chinese: 福建省政府
Transcriptions
Standard Mandarin
- Hanyu Pinyin: Fújiàn Shěng Zhèngfǔ
- Wade–Giles: Fu^{2}-chien^{4} Shêng^{3} Chêng^{4}-fu^{3}
Hakka
- Pha̍k-fa-sṳ: Fuk-kien Sén Chṳn-fú
Southern Min
- Hokkien POJ: Hok-kiàn Séng Chèng-hú
- Tâi-lô: Hok-kiàn Síng Tsìng-hú
Eastern Min
- Fuzhou BUC: Hók-gióng Sēng Céng-hū

The Fuchien Provincial Government is the nominal government of the streamlined Fuchien Province of the Republic of China. Founded in 1927 in the mainland portion of Fujian, it was evacuated to Kinmen in 1949.

Since 2018, it has been superseded and its duties have been transferred to the Kinmen-Matsu Joint Services Center, the National Development Council and other ministries of the Executive Yuan.

== History ==
After the end of Chinese Civil War in 1949, the Fujian provincial government was moved from Fuzhou to Kinmen. Then, the provincial government was relocated to Xindian Township, Taipei County within Taiwan Province in 1956. On 15 January 1996, the provincial government moved back to Kinmen County.

On 1 July 2018, by a resolution passed during the 3606th meeting of the Executive Yuan, all the remaining duties were transferred to the National Development Council and other ministries of the Executive Yuan. The transformation were scheduled to be done before the end of the year 2018. However, the government will keep the position of Governor of Fujian Province to comply with the requirement set by the Additional Articles of the Constitution.

== Government structure ==
The only official who served in the provincial government was the Governor of Fujian Province (also called the Chairperson of the Fujian Provincial Government). The Governor was usually also a minister without portfolio in Executive Yuan.

The provincial government was left with no physical building or office space after all of its functionalities were handed over to the central government in 2018. Historically, the provincial government was located in Jincheng, Kinmen from 1949 to 1956, in Xindian, Taipei County from 1956 to January 1996 and in Jincheng, Kinmen again from January 1996 to 2018.

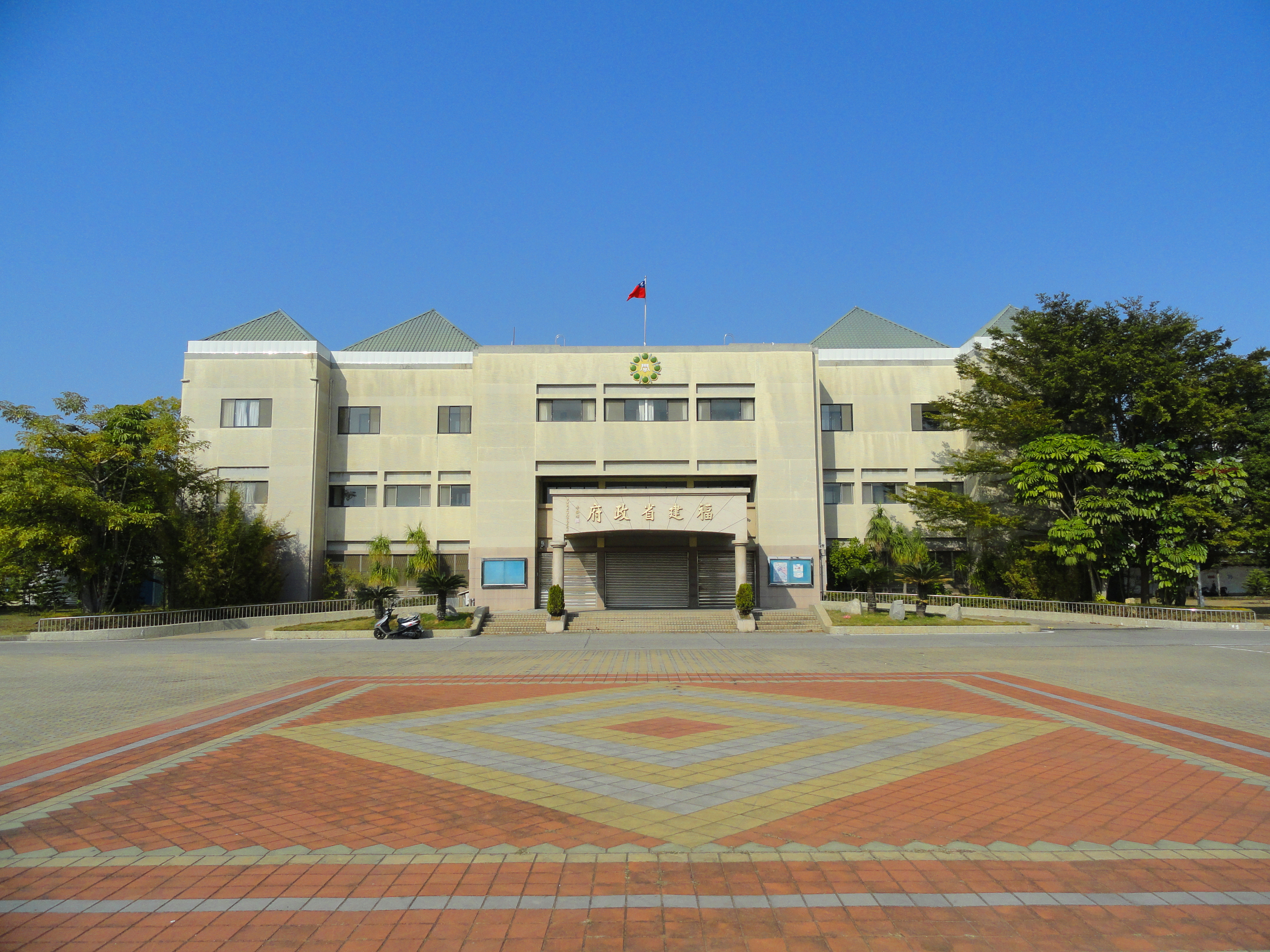
Fujian Provincial Government building between January 1996 to 2018. Currently the Kinmen-Matsu Joint Services Center, Executive Yuan

== Governor of Fuchien Province ==
The Governor of the Fuchien Province is the Chairperson of the Fujian Provincial Government.

=== Government in Foochow (Minhow County) ===
No.	Portrait	Name (Birth–Death)	Term of Office		Political Party
1		Yang Shu-chuang 楊樹莊; Yáng Shùzhuāng (1882–1934)	1 May 1927	7 December 1932	Kuomintang
1		Yang Shu-chuang 楊樹莊; Yáng Shùzhuāng (1882–1934)	Concurrently held position as Minister of the Navy.		
—		Chen Nai-yuan 陳乃元; Chén Nǎiyuán (1878–1930)	5 February 1929	6 January 1930	Kuomintang
—		Chen Nai-yuan 陳乃元; Chén Nǎiyuán (1878–1930)	As acting; head of Provincial Civil Affairs Department.		
—		Fang Sheng-tao 方聲濤; Fāng Shēngtāo (1885–1934)	6 January 1930	7 December 1932	Kuomintang
—		Fang Sheng-tao 方聲濤; Fāng Shēngtāo (1885–1934)	As acting; head of Provincial Public Security Department.		
2		Chiang Kuang-nai 蔣光鼐; Jiǎng Guāngnài (1888–1967)	7 December 1932	20 December 1933	Kuomintang
3		Chen Yi 陳儀; Chén Yí (1883–1950)	12 January 1934	28 August 1941	Kuomintang
3		Chen Yi 陳儀; Chén Yí (1883–1950)	Provincial government relocated to Yong'an County from 1938 after Japan instituted a sea blockade and the Second Sino-Japanese War.		
4		Liu Chien-hsü 劉建緒; Liú Jiànxù (1892–1978)	28 August 1941	16 September 1948	Kuomintang
4		Liu Chien-hsü 劉建緒; Liú Jiànxù (1892–1978)	Government relocated back to Fuzhou in 1945.		
5		Li Liang-jung 李良榮; Lǐ Liángróng (1906–1967)	16 September 1948	20 January 1949	Kuomintang
6		Chu Shao-liang 朱紹良; Zhū Shàoliáng (1891–1963)	20 January 1949	4 October 1949	Kuomintang
=== Government in Jincheng, Kinmen County ===
No.	Portrait	Name (Birth–Death)	Term of Office		Political Party
—		Fang Chih 方治; Fāng Zhì (1895–1989)	18 August 1949	30 September 1949	Kuomintang
—		Fang Chih 方治; Fāng Zhì (1895–1989)	As acting; Member of the National Assembly.		
—		Huang Chin-tao 黃金濤; Huáng Jīntāo (1888–1957)	30 September 1949	23 November 1949	Kuomintang
—		Huang Chin-tao 黃金濤; Huáng Jīntāo (1888–1957)	As acting; head of Provincial Public Works Department.		
7		Hu Lien 胡璉; Hú Liǎn (1907–1977)	23 November 1949	1 February 1955	Kuomintang
7		Hu Lien 胡璉; Hú Liǎn (1907–1977)	Concurrently held position as Commander of the Kinmen Defense Command.		
=== Government in Hsintien, Taipei County ===
No.	Portrait	Name (Birth–Death)	Term of Office		Political Party
8		Tai Chung-yu 戴仲玉; Dài Zhòngyù (1910–1986)	1 February 1955	21 May 1986	Kuomintang
8		Tai Chung-yu 戴仲玉; Dài Zhòngyù (1910–1986)	Provincial Government relocated to Hsintien, Taipei County, Taiwan in July 1956. Longest serving chairperson. Died in office.		
9		Wu Chin-tzan 吳金贊; Wú Jīnzàn (1935–2012)	20 June 1986	9 February 1998	Kuomintang
9		Wu Chin-tzan 吳金贊; Wú Jīnzàn (1935–2012)	Provincial Government returned to Kinmen on 15 January 1996.		
=== Government in Jincheng, Kinmen County ===
No.	Portrait	Name (Birth–Death)	Term of Office		Political Party
10		Yen Chung-cheng 顏忠誠; Yán Zhōngchéng (1928–)	10 February 1998	21 May 2007	Kuomintang
—		Yang Cheng-hsi 楊誠璽; Yáng Chéngxǐ	21 May 2007	28 November 2007	Kuomintang
—		Yang Cheng-hsi 楊誠璽; Yáng Chéngxǐ	As acting; head of the First Division of the Provincial Government.		
11		Chen Chin-jun 陳景峻; Chén Jǐngjùn (1956–)	28 November 2007	20 May 2008	Democratic Progressive Party
11		Chen Chin-jun 陳景峻; Chén Jǐngjùn (1956–)	Concurrently held position as Secretary General of the Executive Yuan.		
12		Hsueh Hsiang-chuan 薛香川; Xuē Xiāngchuān (1944–)	20 May 2008	10 September 2009	Kuomintang
12		Hsueh Hsiang-chuan 薛香川; Xuē Xiāngchuān (1944–)	Concurrently held position as Secretary General of the Executive Yuan.		
13		James Hsueh 薛承泰; Xuē Chéngtài (1956–)	10 September 2009	18 February 2013	Kuomintang
13		James Hsueh 薛承泰; Xuē Chéngtài (1956–)	Concurrently held position as Minister Without Portfolio.		
14		Chen Shyh-kwei 陳士魁; Chén Shìkuí (1952–)	18 February 2013	1 August 2013	Kuomintang
14		Chen Shyh-kwei 陳士魁; Chén Shìkuí (1952–)	Concurrently held position as Minister Without Portfolio.		
15		Luo Ying-shay 羅瑩雪; Luó Yíngxuě (1951–)	1 August 2013	29 September 2013	Kuomintang
15		Luo Ying-shay 羅瑩雪; Luó Yíngxuě (1951–)	Concurrently held position as Minister Without Portfolio and as Minister of the Mongolian and Tibetan Affairs Commission.		
16		Schive Chi 薛琦; Xuē Qí (1947–)	29 September 2013	25 March 2014	
16		Schive Chi 薛琦; Xuē Qí (1947–)	Concurrently held position as Minister Without Portfolio.		
17		John Deng 鄧振中; Dèng Zhènzhōng (1952–)	25 March 2014	7 December 2014	
17		John Deng 鄧振中; Dèng Zhènzhōng (1952–)	Concurrently held position as Minister Without Portfolio.		
18		Woody Duh 杜紫軍; Dù Zǐjūn (1959–)	7 December 2014	31 January 2016	Independent
18		Woody Duh 杜紫軍; Dù Zǐjūn (1959–)	Concurrently held position as Minister Without Portfolio.		
19		Lin Chu-chia 林祖嘉; Lín Zǔjiā (1956–)	31 January 2016	20 May 2016	
19		Lin Chu-chia 林祖嘉; Lín Zǔjiā (1956–)	Concurrently held position as Minister Without Portfolio and as Minister of the National Development Council.		
20		Chang Ching-sen 張景森; Zhāng Jǐngsēn (1959–)	20 May 2016	1 January 2019	Independent
20		Chang Ching-sen 張景森; Zhāng Jǐngsēn (1959–)	Concurrently held position as Minister Without Portfolio.		

== See also ==
- Taiwan Provincial Government
- Fujian Provincial People's Government, the People's Republic of China's parallel administration for its Fujian Province
