= Secretary-General of the Executive Yuan =

- 行政院秘書長
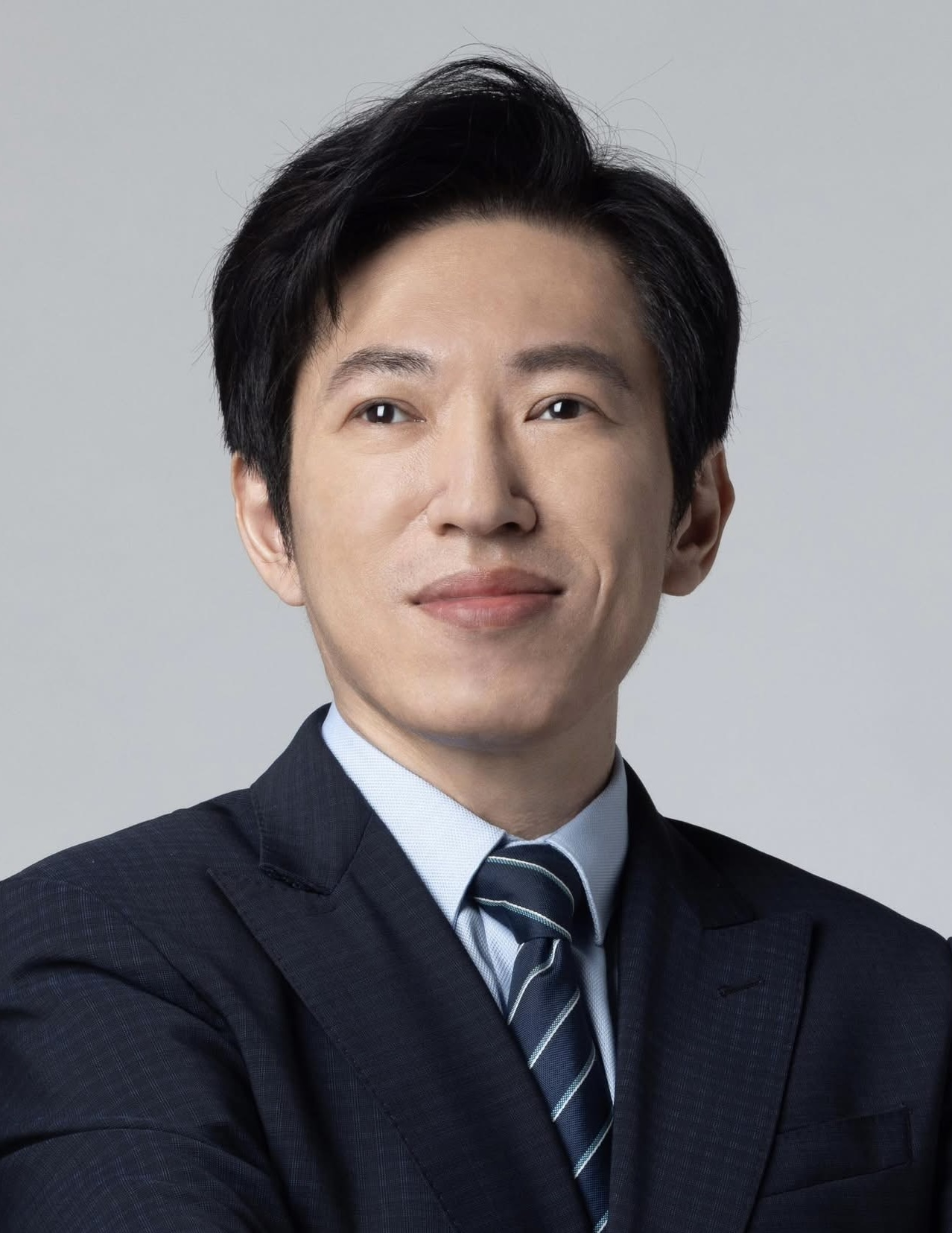
- Incumbent; Chang Tun-han since 1 September 2025
- Website: www.ey.gov.tw/Page/39B565398710A785

The secretary-general of the Executive Yuan is the chief of staff of the Executive Yuan, the executive branch of the Taiwan central government, who handles administrative affairs, and is assisted by two deputy secretaries-general.

== List ==
Political party: Kuomintang Non-partisan/ unknown Democratic Progressive Party

List of secretaries-general of the Executive Yuan (post-1947 Constitution)
No.	Name	Image	Term		Days	Party	Cabinet
No.	Name	Image	Start	End	Days	Party	Cabinet
1	Li Weiguo (李惟果)		31 May 1948	22 December 1948	205	Kuomintang	Weng Wenhao; Sun Fo
2	Duanmu Kai (端木愷)		22 December 1948	21 March 1949	99	Kuomintang	Sun Fo
3	Huang Shao-ku (黃少谷)		21 March 1949	12 June 1949	73	Kuomintang	He Yingqin
4	Chia Ching-teh (賈景德)		12 June 1949	1950		Kuomintang	Yan Xishan
(3)	Huang Shao-ku (黃少谷)		12 March 1950	1 June 1954	1542	Kuomintang	Chen Cheng I
5	Chen Ching-yu (陳慶瑜)		1 June 1954	14 July 1958	1504	Kuomintang	Yu Hung-chun; Chen Cheng II
6	Chen Hsueh-ping (陳雪屏)		14 July 1958	29 November 1967	3425	Kuomintang	Chen Cheng II; Yen Chia-kan
7	Chiang Yen-shih (蔣彥士)		29 November 1967	29 May 1972	1643	Kuomintang	Yen Chia-kan
8	Fei Hua (費驊)		29 May 1972	9 June 1976	1472	Kuomintang	Chiang Ching-kuo
9	Chang Chi-cheng (張繼正)		May 1976	May 1978		Kuomintang	Chiang Ching-kuo
10	Ma Chi-chuang (馬紀壯)		May 1978	December 1978		Kuomintang	Sun Yun-suan
11	Chu Shao-hua (瞿韶華)		December 1978	May 1984		Kuomintang	Sun Yun-suan
12	Wang Chang-ching (王章清)		1 June 1984	July 1988		Kuomintang	Yu Kuo-hua
13	Robert Chien (錢純)		July 1988	May 1989		Kuomintang	Yu Kuo-hua
14	Wang Chao-ming (王昭明)		1989	26 February 1993		Kuomintang	Lee Huan; Hau Pei-tsun
15	Li Ho-kao (李厚高)		26 February 1993	14 December 1993	291	Kuomintang	Lien Chan
16	Chao Shou-po (趙守博)		14 December 1993	1 September 1997	1357	Kuomintang	Lien Chan
17	Chang Yu-hui (張有惠)		1 September 1997	27 January 1999	513	Kuomintang	Vincent Siew
18	Hsieh Shen-shan		27 January 1999	20 May 2000	479	Kuomintang	Vincent Siew
19	Wea Chi-lin (魏啟林)		20 May 2000	6 October 2000	139	Democratic Progressive Party	Tang Fei
20	Chiou I-jen (邱義仁)		6 October 2000	1 February 2002	483	Democratic Progressive Party	Chang Chun-hsiung I
21	Lee Ying-yuan (李應元)		1 February 2002	1 July 2002	150	Democratic Progressive Party	Yu Shyi-kun
22	Liu Shyh-fang (劉世芳)		1 July 2002	20 May 2004	689	Democratic Progressive Party	Yu Shyi-kun
23	Arthur Iap (葉國興)		20 May 2004	1 February 2005	257	Independent	Yu Shyi-kun
(21)	Lee Ying-yuan (李應元)		1 February 2005	14 September 2005	225	Democratic Progressive Party	Frank Hsieh
24	Cho Jung-tai (卓榮泰)		14 September 2005	25 January 2006	133	Democratic Progressive Party	Frank Hsieh
25	Liu Yuh-san (劉玉山)		25 January 2006	21 May 2007	481	Independent	Su Tseng-chang I
26	Chen Chin-jun (陳景峻)		21 May 2007	20 May 2008	365	Democratic Progressive Party	Chang Chun-hsiung II
27	Hsueh Hsiang-chuan (薛香川)		20 May 2008	10 September 2009	478	Kuomintang	Liu Chao-shiuan
28	Lin Join-sane (林中森)		10 September 2009	5 February 2012	879	Kuomintang	Wu Den-yih
29	Lin Yi-shih (林益世)		6 February 2012	29 June 2012	144	Kuomintang	Sean Chen
30	Chen Shyh-kwei (陳士魁)		10 July 2012	7 February 2013	212	Kuomintang	Sean Chen
31	Chen Wei-zen (陳威仁)		18 February 2013	28 February 2014	376	Kuomintang	Jiang Yi-huah
32	Lee Shu-chuan (李四川)		1 March 2014	21 January 2015	326	Kuomintang	Jiang Yi-huah; Mao Chi-kuo
33	Chien Tai-lang (簡太郎)		24 January 2015	20 May 2016	482	Kuomintang	Mao Chi-kuo; Chang San-cheng
34	Chen Mei-ling (陳美伶)		20 May 2016	7 September 2017	476	Independent	Lin Chuan
(24)	Cho Jung-tai (卓榮泰)		8 September 2017	28 December 2018	476	Democratic Progressive Party	William Lai
35	Li Meng-yen (李孟諺)		14 January 2019	20 May 2024	2793	Independent	Su Tseng-chang II; Chen Chien-jen
36	Kung Ming-hsin (龔明鑫)		20 May 2024	1 September 2025	840	Independent	Cho Jung-tai
37	Chang Tun-han (張惇涵)		September 1, 2025	Incumbent		Democratic Progressive Party	

== See also ==
- Executive Yuan
- Government of the Republic of China
- Politics of the Republic of China
