= Mysterious Little Bay =

Bay in Juguang, Lienchiang, Taiwan

Mysterious Little Bay 神祕小海灣
- beach
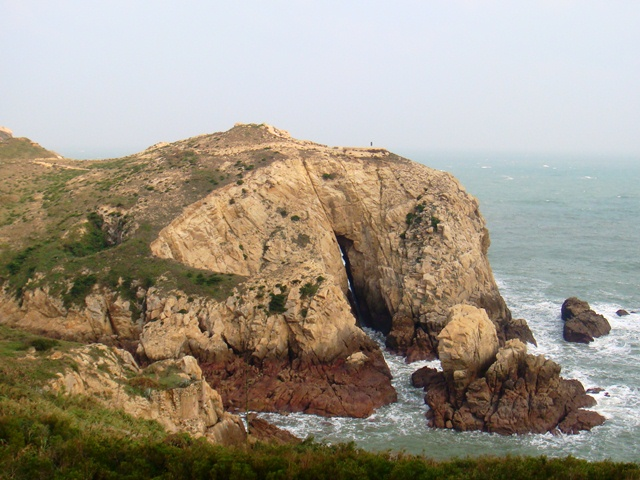

- Taiwan
- Coordinates: 25°57′25.3″N 119°58′57.3″E
- Location: Juguang, Lienchiang, Fuchien, Republic of China (Taiwan)

The Mysterious Little Bay (traditional Chinese: 神祕小海灣; simplified Chinese: 神秘小海湾; pinyin: Shénmì Xiǎo Hǎiwān) or Lü-He Cliff is a bay in Dongju Island, Juguang Township, Lienchiang County, Fujian Province, Republic of China.

== History ==
The bay had been used by the local residents to hide from pirates.

== Geology ==
The bay consists of many wave-cut gullies. It is also the gathering place for many birds.

== See also ==
- List of tourist attractions in Taiwan
