= Xiju Power Plant =

Power plant in Juguang, Lienchiang, Taiwan

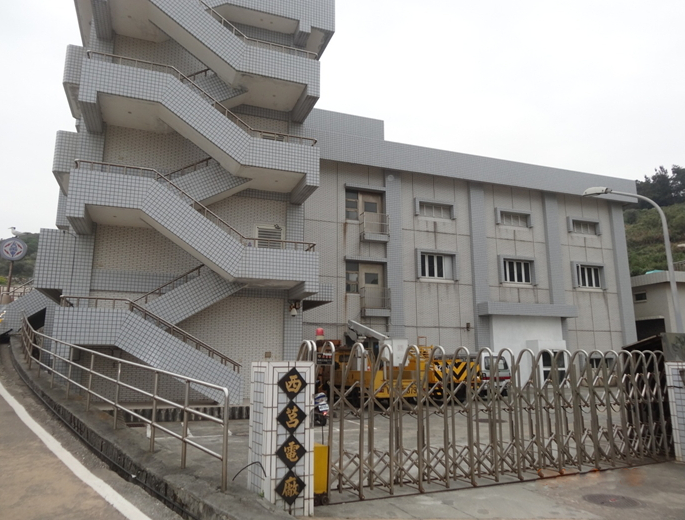
- Official name: 西莒發電廠
- Country: Taiwan
- Location: Juguang, Lienchiang, Taiwan
- Coordinates: 25°58′25.4″N 119°56′07.8″E
- Status: Operational
- Commission date: 1978 (unit 1); September 1993 (unit 2); October 2003 (unit 3-4); June 1994 (unit 5); December 1997 (unit 6); July 2000 (unit 7)
- Owner: Taipower
- Operator: Taipower

Thermal power station
- Primary fuel: Diesel fuel

Power generation
- Units operational: 2 × 1,500 kW (unit 3-4); 540 kW (unit 5); 720 kW (unit 6); 1,000 kW (unit 7)
- Nameplate capacity: 5.26 MW

The Xiju Power Plant (Chinese: 西莒發電廠; pinyin: Xījǔ Fādiànchǎng) is a diesel-fuel power plant in Xiju Island, Juguang Township, Lienchiang County, Taiwan.

== History ==
The power plant was commissioned in 1979. Due to the changes in electricity needs, Xiju Power Plant was connected by submarine power cable to Dongju Power Plant in Dongju Island since 2000.

== See also ==
- List of power stations in Taiwan
- Electricity sector in Taiwan
