= Liu Yuh-san =

Taiwanese politician and engineer

- 劉玉山

Secretary-General of the Executive Yuan
- In office 25 January 2006 – 21 May 2007
- Preceded by: Cho Jung-tai
- Succeeded by: Chen Chin-jun

Personal details
- Born: 30 October 1944 (age 81)
- Education: National Cheng Kung University (BS, PhD); National Chung Hsing University (MS); Asian Institute of Technology (ME)

Liu Yuh-san (Chinese: 劉玉山; pinyin: Liú Yùshān; born 30 October 1944) is a Taiwanese politician and engineer.

== Education ==
Liu graduated from National Cheng Kung University with a bachelor's degree in management science in 1968. He then earned a master's degree in urban planning from National Chung Hsing University, a Master of Engineering (M.E.) in systems engineering from the Asian Institute of Technology in 1975, and, in 1986, a Ph.D. in civil engineering from National Cheng Kung University.

== Political career ==
He was the Secretary-General of the Executive Yuan from 2006 to 2007. Liu then served as a member of the Control Yuan from 2008 to 2014.
