= Chang Ching-sen =

Taiwanese engineer and politician (born 1959)

- 張景森
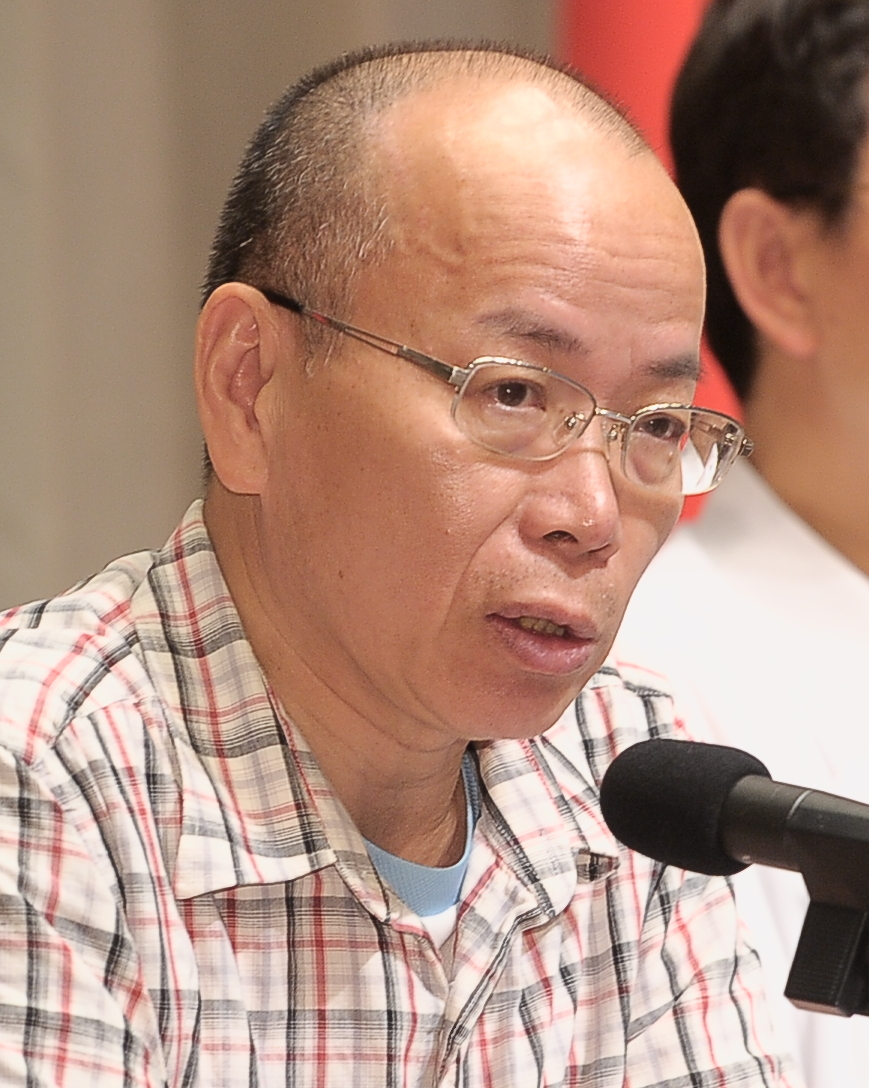

Director of the Kinmen-Matsu Joint Services Center
- Incumbent
- Assumed office 1 January 2017
- Preceded by: Position established (as Governor of Fujian Province to 1 January 2019)

Minister without Portfolio
- Incumbent
- Assumed office 20 May 2016
- Premier: Lin Chuan; William Lai; Hope Su

Governor of Fujian Province
- In office 20 May 2016 – 1 January 2019
- Preceded by: Lin Chu-chia
- Succeeded by: Position abolished (as Director of the Kinmen-Matsu Joint Services Center from 1 January 2019)

Personal details
- Born: 8 October 1959 (age 66) Yunlin County, Taiwan Province, Taiwan
- Party: Independent
- Education: National Taiwan University (BS, PhD)

Chang Ching-sen (Chinese: 張景森; pinyin: Zhāng Jǐngsēn; born 8 October 1959) is a Taiwanese civil engineer and politician. He is known for his advocacy to resolve the North-South divide in Taiwan.

== Early life and education ==
Chang graduated from National Taiwan University with a Bachelor of Science (B.S.) in 1982 and earned his Ph.D. in civil engineering from the university in 1991. His doctoral dissertation was titled, "Modern Urban Planning in Taiwan: A Political, Historical, and Economic Study (1895-1988)".

== Political career ==
In the mid-2000s, Chang was the vice chairman of the Council for Economic Planning and Development. He served as an advisor to Ko Wen-je's 2014 Taipei mayoral campaign. He was named a policy advisor to Tsai Ing-wen's 2016 presidential bid. After Tsai won, her designated premier Lin Chuan named Chang to the cabinet as a minister without portfolio on 7 April 2016. Three weeks before he took office on 20 May, Chang made controversial comments on Facebook about an urban renewal project in Shilin District. He apologized via Facebook two days after making the post, but later chose to deactivate his account on the social media platform.

== Cross-strait relations ==
In September 2016 Chang made an unofficial statement that Mainland Chinese tourists are Taiwan's most needed friends, and to the Taiwanese that there is a difference between the Mainland Chinese people and the Mainland Chinese government.
