= Juguang, Lienchiang =

Juguang Township 莒光鄉 Chukuang, Meihua
- Rural township
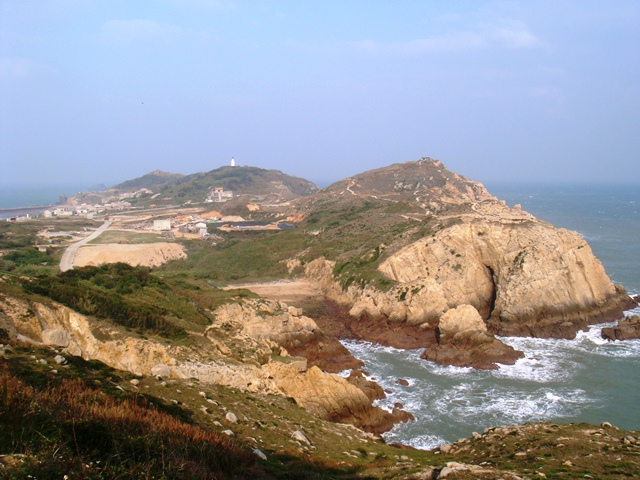
- Dongju

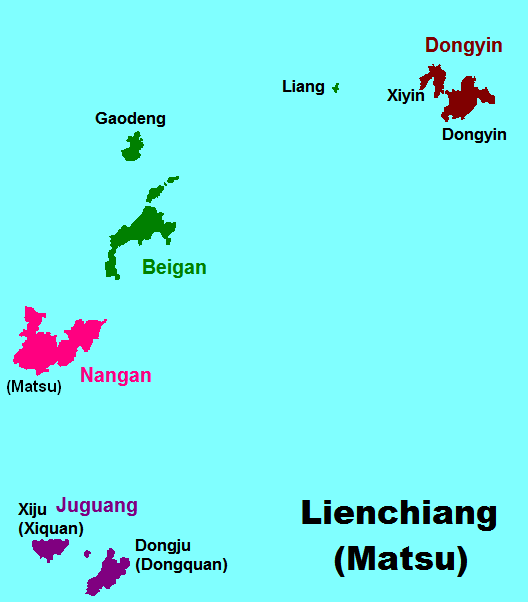
- Juguang Township in Lienchiang County
- Coordinates: 25°58′00″N 119°57′20″E
- Country: Republic of China (Taiwan)
- Province: Fuchien (streamlined)
- County: Lienchiang
- Rural villages: 5

Government
  - Mayor: Hsieh Chun-Lan (謝春欗) (KMT)

Area
  - Total: 5.26 km^{2} (2.03 sq mi)

Population (March 2023)
  - Total: 1,469
  - Density: 279/km^{2} (723/sq mi)
- Time zone: UTC+8 (National Standard Time)
- Postal code: 211
- Website: www.chukuang.gov.tw

Juguang Township, (Note: Chinese: 莒光鄉; Hanyu Pinyin: Jǔguāng Xiāng; Tongyong Pinyin: Jyǔguang Siang; Wade–Giles: Chü^{3}-kuang^{1} Hsiang^{1}; Foochow Romanized: Gṳ̄-guŏng-hiŏng)) also spelled Chukuang and Jyuguang, is a rural township of Lienchiang County (the Matsu Islands), in Taiwan's Fuchien Province. Juguang Township includes two major islands, Dongju Island (東莒) and Xiju Island (西莒), as well as some islets. The islands are also claimed by the China as Meihua Town (Note: Chinese: 梅花镇; pinyin: Méihuā zhèn) located in Changle City, Fuzhou within its own Fujian Province.

== Name ==
They have also been called the Baiquan, Paichuan, White Dogs or White Dog Islands (白犬島; Băh-kēng-dō̤). They've also been called the Baiken Islands (白肯島). The name Baiquan (白犬) has been connected with the homophonous name Baiquan (白畎).

== History ==
On May 15, 1617, sixty-nine wokou were captured alive in the area.

In 1872, construction of the Dongsha Lighthouse (Dongquan Lighthouse) began.

In December 1939, Japanese naval forces from Taiwan occupied the islands.

The islands were originally part of the Changlo County (長樂縣) before the ROC government evacuated to Taiwan. It is still considered by the government of the People's Republic of China to be part of Changle, Fuzhou.

In September 1953, the Changlo County government was established on the islands.

Western Enterprises (西方公司), a CIA front organization, had a communications base on Hsichuan.

After a series of combat readiness tests carried out by MAAG were completed on April 15, 1955, the overall Chinese Nationalist defense preparations for the Matsu Islands were rated as satisfactory. One of the weaknesses noted was "the seriously understrength regiment garrisoning the Paichuan (White Dog) Islands group".

In July 1956, the islands were transferred to Lienchiang County. The islands were divided into two townships: Hsichuan and Tungchuan.

On August 19, 1958, President Chiang Kai-shek visited Hsichuan and spoke to the soldiers there.

In September 1960, the two townships were united into one, Paichuan Township (白犬鄉; Báiquǎn Xiāng; 'White Dogs township').

On July 23, 1964, Chiang Ching-kuo visited the islands.

On October 15, 1971, the Executive Yuan approved changing the name of the township from Paichuan Township (白犬鄉) to Chukuang Township. They also approved changing the name of Hsi-ch'üan Island (西犬; Xīquǎn; Să̤-kēng; lit. 'Western Dog') to Hsiju Island (西莒; Xījǔ) and Tung-ch'üan Island (東犬; Dōngquǎn; Dĕ̤ng-kēng; lit. 'Eastern Dog') to Tongchu Island (東莒; Dōngjǔ). The islands were renamed based on a quote of a speech by Chiang Kai-shek, "forget not that you're in Ju" (毋忘在莒; Wú wàng zài Jǔ; Ù uông câi Gṳ̄). It refers to the City of Ju, where the king of Qi prepared a counterattack that retook his country from the State of Yan. This is an analogy of Matsu and Taiwan generally as bases of the Republic of China (ROC) to regenerate itself and one day recover mainland China from the Chinese Communist Party.

On December 30, 1977, the 6-ton fishing boat Kuanghua 16638 was slammed by a communist vessel near the Liuchuan reefs (劉泉礁) off the coast of Juguang.

On September 21, 1979, and on May 3, 1980, President Chiang Ching-kuo visited the township.

On June 18, 1993, President Lee Teng-hui visited the Dongju Elementary School.

On June 24, 2001, Typhoon Chebi caused 3,000,000 yuan of damage on the islands.

In the 2018 election, Mayor Hsieh Chun-Lan (謝春欗) was re-elected mayor, defeating her opponent Chen Shun-Shou (陳順壽) by over a hundred votes. Hsieh called for rebuilding the former township office as a resort, beautification of the township, and creation of a vibrant sight-seeing economy.

In 2020, undersea communications cables between Nangan and Juguang were damaged by sand dredgers from mainland China on five occasions, disrupting phone and internet services.

== Geography ==
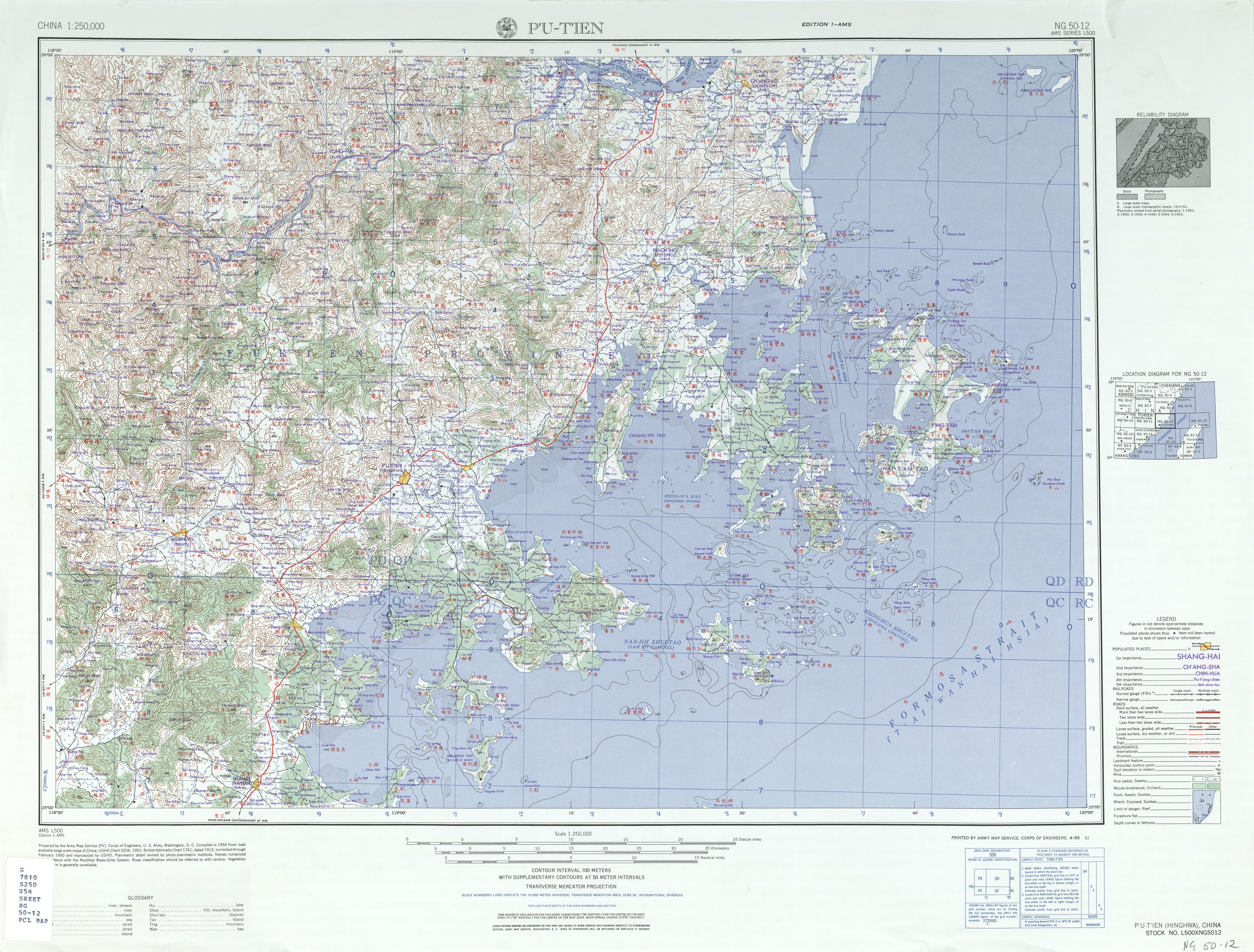
Dongju (labeled as TUNG-CH'ÜAN-TAO 東犬島) and Xiju (HSI-CH'ÜAN TAO (TUNG-SHA TAO) 西犬島) (1954)

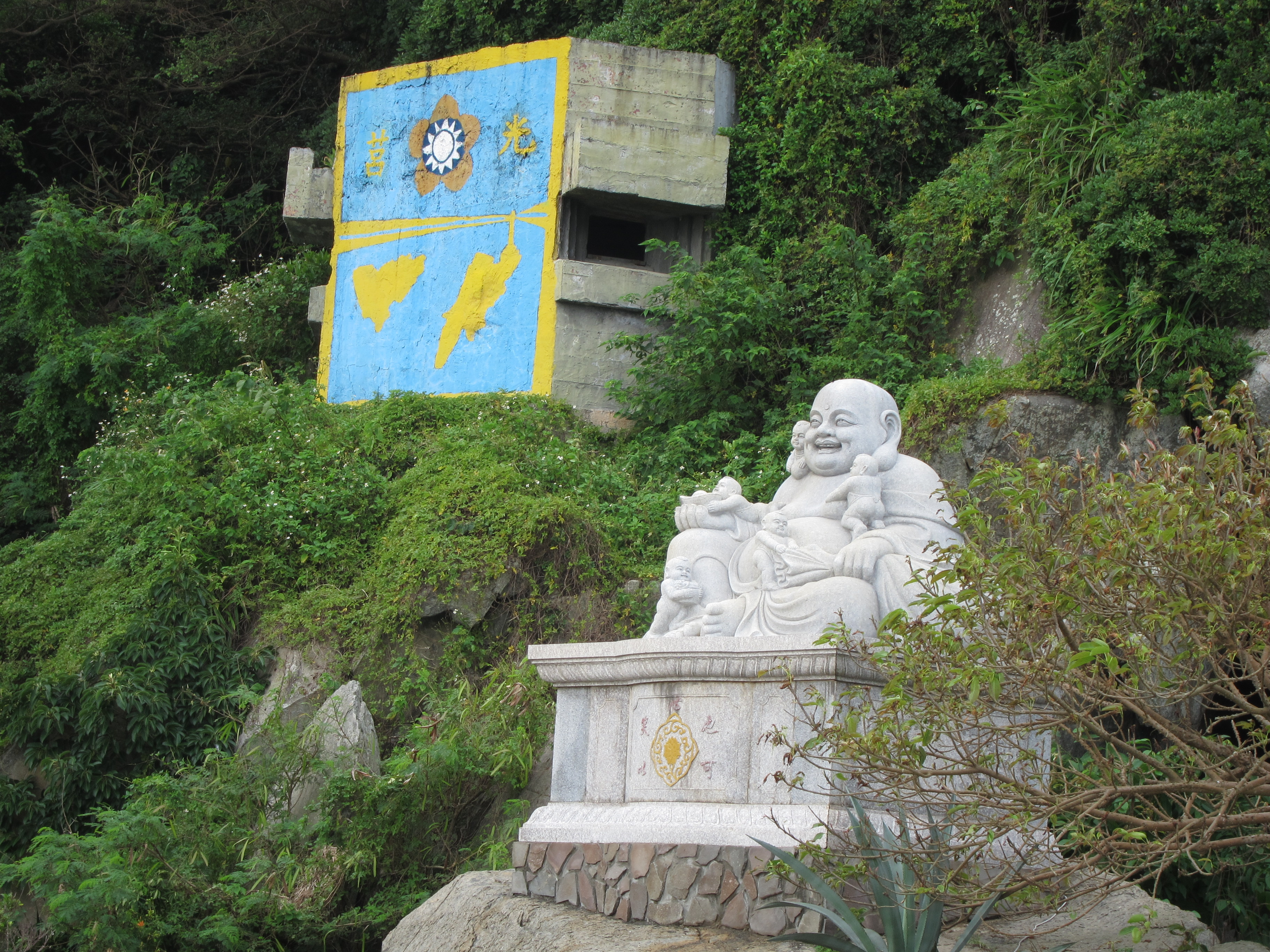

The primary islands are Xiju, which is 2.36 km^{2}, and Dongju, the southernmost of the Matsu Islands, which is 2.63 km^{2}. Dongju is shaped like a dagger, while Xiju a triangle, so it is seemingly bigger on maps. Some cliffs of Dongju is severely corroded by wind, creating a strangely aesthetic appearance. Islets include Yongliu (永留嶼), Linaoyu (林坳嶼; also known as Lintouyu (林頭嶼)), Xiniuyu (犀牛嶼), Dayu (大嶼), Xiaoyu (小嶼), and Sheshan (蛇山). The northernmost and easternmost points of Juguang Township are on Dayu, the westernmost point is on Sheshan, and the southernmost point is on Linaoyu. Linaoyu is also the southernmost point of the Matsu Islands.

Juguang is across from Mainland China's Meihua Town (梅花镇) in Changle District, Fuzhou.

== Politics and government ==
=== Administrative divisions ===
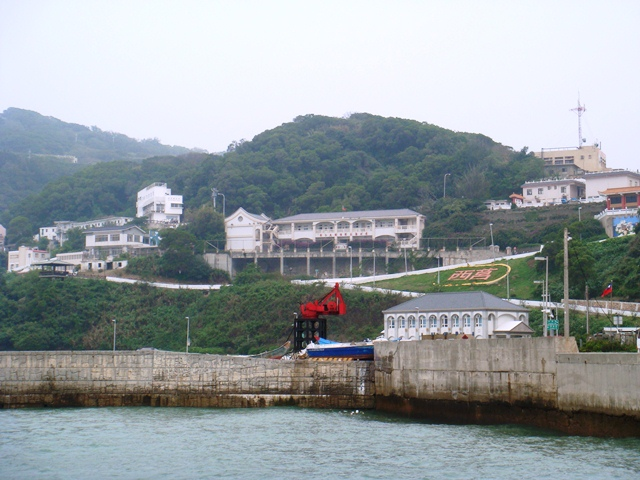
Xiju Island

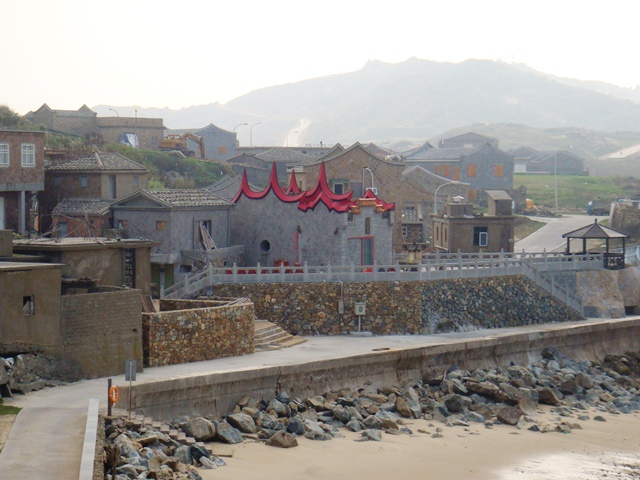
Dongju Island

Administratively the islands are part of the Lienchiang County. Neither Dongju nor Xiju has an island-wide administrative level. The islands are divided into five rural villages:

==== Xiju Island ====
- Qingfan Village (青帆村, 青蕃村)
- Xiqiu Village (西坵村)
- Tianwo Village (田沃村)

==== Dongju Island ====
- Daping Village (大坪村)
- Fuzheng Village (福正村)

=== Mayors ===
==== Appointed mayors ====
1. Chen Chia-Tui (陳家錞) (1960-1961)
2. Lin Tso-Chou (林作舟) (1961-1964)
3. Hsueh Chih-Lien (薛繼廉) (1964-1967), former mayor of Nangan
4. Li Kuei-Li (李貴立) (1967-1970), later mayor of Beigan
5. Chen I-Peng (陳一鵬) (1970-1973), mayor during the change of the name of the township and islands, former mayor of Beigan and later mayor of Nangan (Matsu)
6. Lin Po-Jen (林柏仁) (1973-1978)

==== Elected mayors ====
1. Lin Mao-Chun (林茂春) (1978-1982), received 692 votes out of a total 697 votes cast (699 eligible voters)
2. Chen Chien-Kuang (陳建光) (1982-1986)
3. Chen Le-Tuan (陳樂團) (1986-1990)
4. Tsao Erh-Szu (曹爾思) (1990-1994)
5. Wang Ta-Chieh (王大捷) (1994-1998)
6. Chiang Chih-Hsing (姜繼興) (1998-2002)
7. Wang Ta-Chieh (王大捷) (2002-2006), second term
8. Ko Yu-Kuan (柯玉官) (2006-2014)
9. Hsieh Chun-Lan (謝春欗) (2014–present) (KMT), b.1960 first female mayor of the township

== Infrastructure ==
=== Electricity supply ===
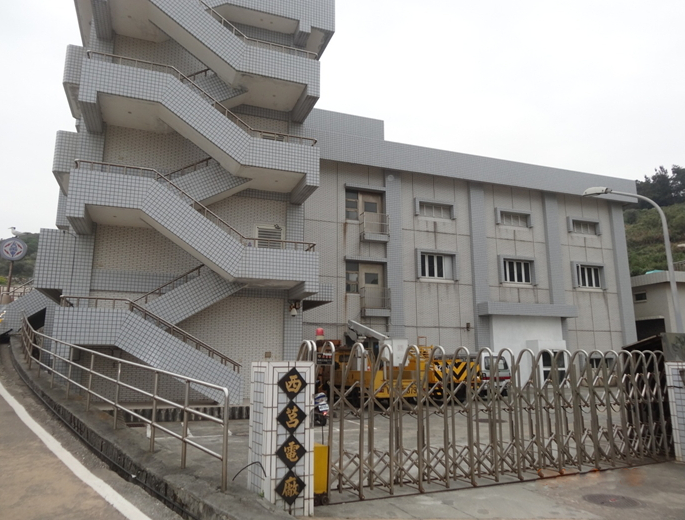
Xiju Power Plant

The township is powered up by Xiju Power Plant located in Xiju Island and Dongju Power Plant located in Dongju Island. Due to the changes in electricity needs, both islands were interconnected by submarine power cable since 2000.

=== Water supply ===
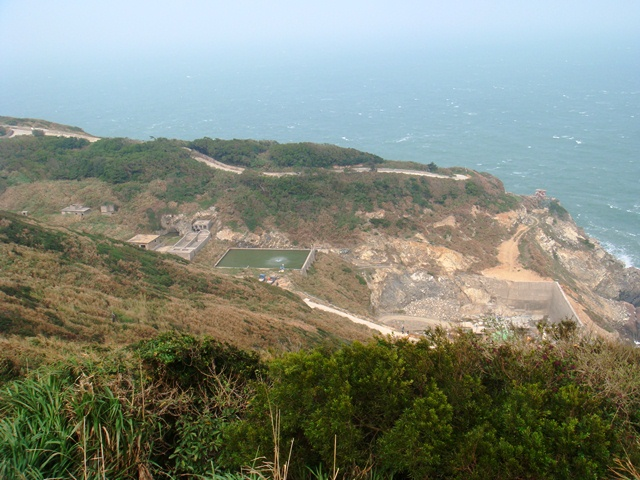
Ledao'ao Reservoir

Previously, water supply had been scarce in Xiju Island despite having water wells drilled around the island by the residents. Later the military built a dam and formed the Ledao'ao Reservoir for the water needs of residents, defense and irrigation.

== Tourism ==
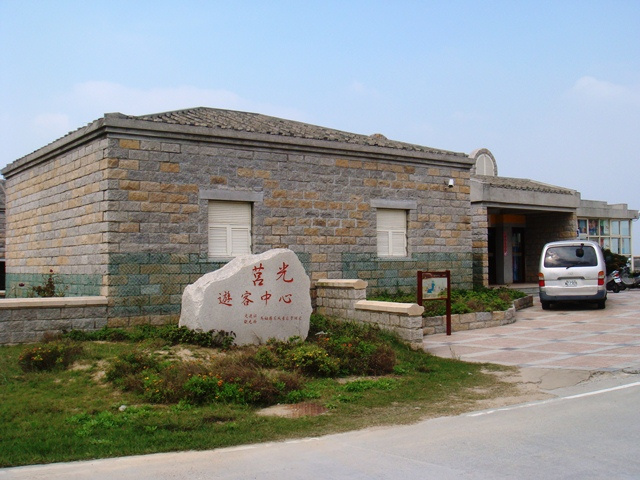
Juguang Visitor Center

The 19.5-metre (54-step) Dongquan Lighthouse on northern Dongju, made during the late Qing dynasty with granite. The guiding light is in the shape of a clam and can reach 16.7 nautical miles (30.9 km). Dongju Lighthouse is a second-level national historic building. In front of the lighthouse, there used to be four mist-cannon for signaling, but has now been removed and placed in Matsu Folk Culture Museum.

The 42-character Dapu Inscription, in Dapu Seaport of Dongju, was made during the Wanli era of the Ming dynasty, concerning the capture of pirates alive. Remembering-the-Past Pavilion (懷古亭) was constructed in 1966 sheltering the stone.

In the sea south of the Xiju, there is Snake Mountain (蛇山). The main island has a small Green-sail Seaport (青帆港), two water reservoirs and a middle-elementary school, but are not major tourist attractions.

It also features the Mysterious Little Bay.

== Transportation ==
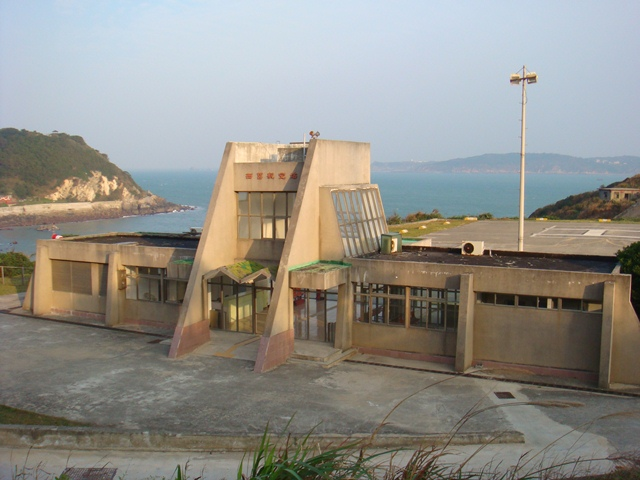
Heliport on Xiju Island

There is one accessible seaport on Xiju, and two on Dongju. Juguang can be reached by ferry from Fuao Harbor in Nangan or by helicopter which only operates during the winter and priority on which is given to local residents.

== Education ==
There are two public elementary and junior high schools in Juguang: Lienchiang County Jingheng Junior High & Elementary School (連江縣敬恆國民中小學) is on Xiju, while Lienchiang County Jinguang Township Dong Jyu Junior High & Elementary School (連江縣莒光鄉東莒國民中小學) is on Dongju.

National Matsu Senior High School (國立馬祖高級中學), operated by the national government, is located in Nangan.

== Notable natives ==
- Chen Hsueh-sheng, Magistrate of Lienchiang County (2001-2009)

== See also ==
- Administrative divisions of the Republic of China
- List of islands of the Republic of China
- List of islands in the East China Sea
