= Dapu Inscription =

Epigraphy in Juguang, Lienchiang, Taiwan

- 大埔石刻 (Chinese)
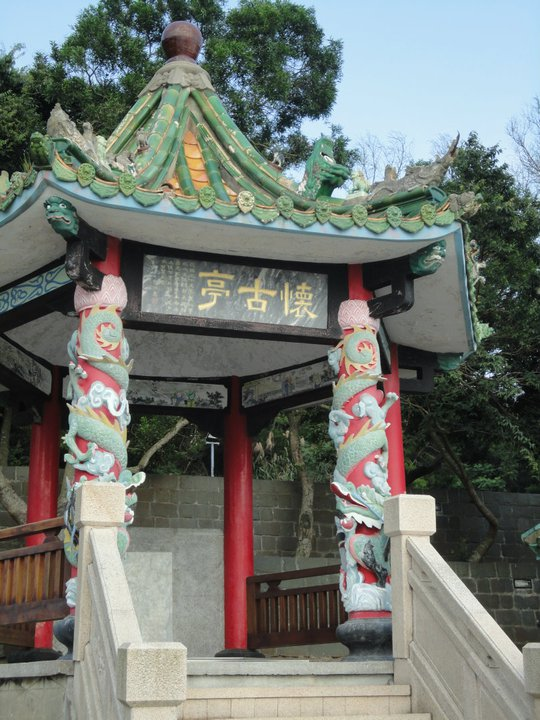

- Location within Taiwan
- 25°56′47.4″N 119°58′01.8″E
- Type: epigraphy
- Location: Juguang, Lienchiang County, Taiwan

The Dapu Inscription (Chinese: 大埔石刻; pinyin: Dàbù Shíkè) is an epigraphy in Dongju Island, Juguang Township, Lienchiang County, Taiwan.

== History ==
The inscription was discovered by the armed forces in 1953.

== Architecture ==
The inscription is made of granite stele. It describes the story of General Sheng Yurong in catching Japanese pirates alive during the Ming Dynasty.
