= Dongquan Lighthouse =

Lighthouse in Juguang, Lienchiang, Taiwan

Dongquan Lighthouse Tungchu Tao
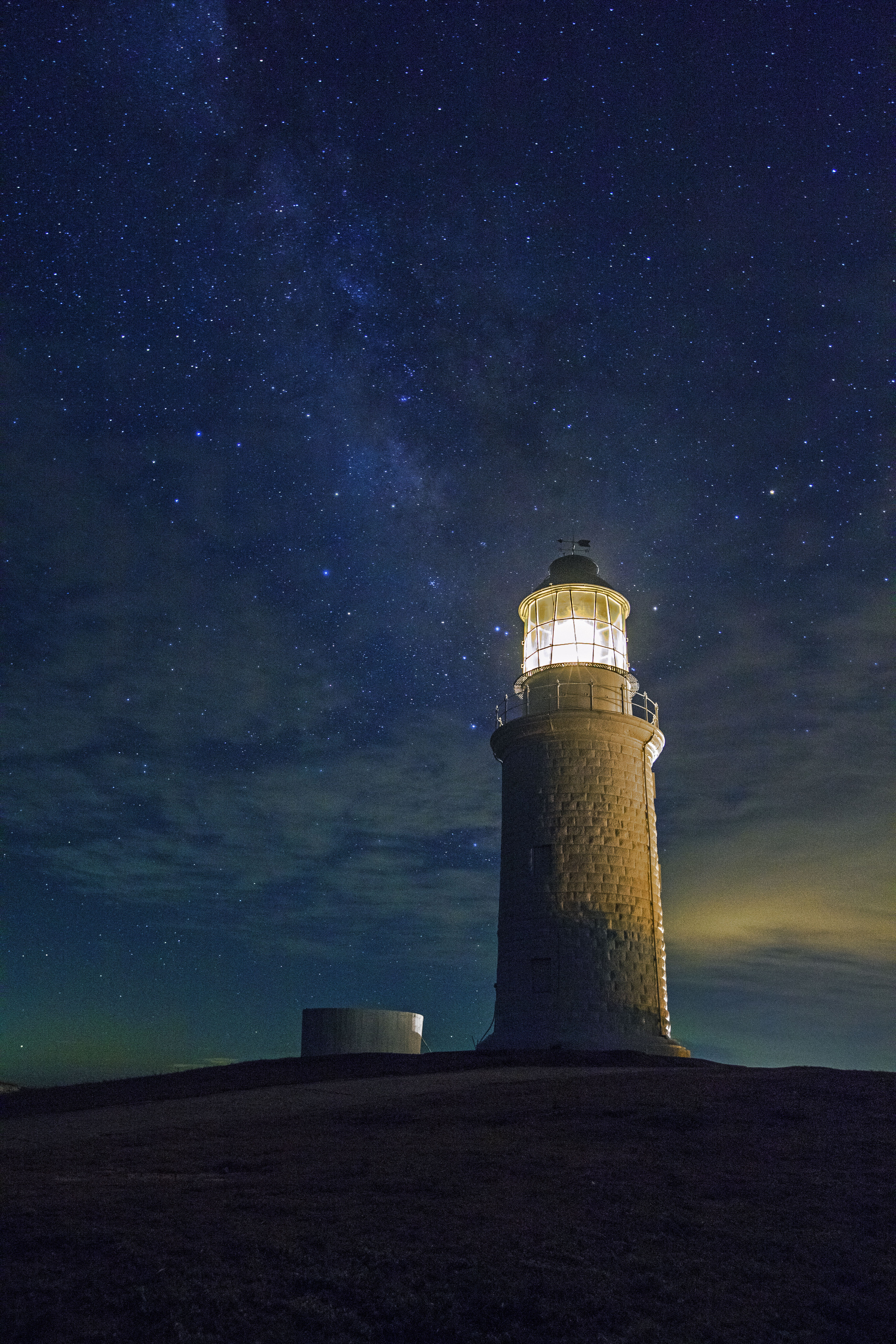
- Location: Dongju Island; Matsu Islands; Juguang; Taiwan
- Coordinates: 25°58′04.5″N 119°59′08.6″E

Tower
- Constructed: 1872
- Construction: granite tower
- Height: 19.5 metres (64 ft)
- Shape: cylindrical tower with balcony and lantern
- Markings: white tower, black lantern dome
- Power source: mains electricity
- Operator: Maritime and Port Bureau

Light
- Focal height: 78.3 metres (257 ft)
- Lens: second order Fresnel lens
- Range: 16.7 nautical miles (30.9 km; 19.2 mi)
- Characteristic: Fl (1+2) W 20s.

The Dongquan Lighthouse (Chinese: 東犬燈塔; pinyin: Dōngquǎn Dēngtǎ) or Dongju Island Lighthouse (Chinese: 東莒島燈塔; pinyin: Dōngjǔ Dǎo Dēngtǎ) or Tungchu Tao Lighthouse is a lighthouse on Dongju Island, Juguang Township, Lienchiang County, Fujian Province, Republic of China (Taiwan).

== History ==
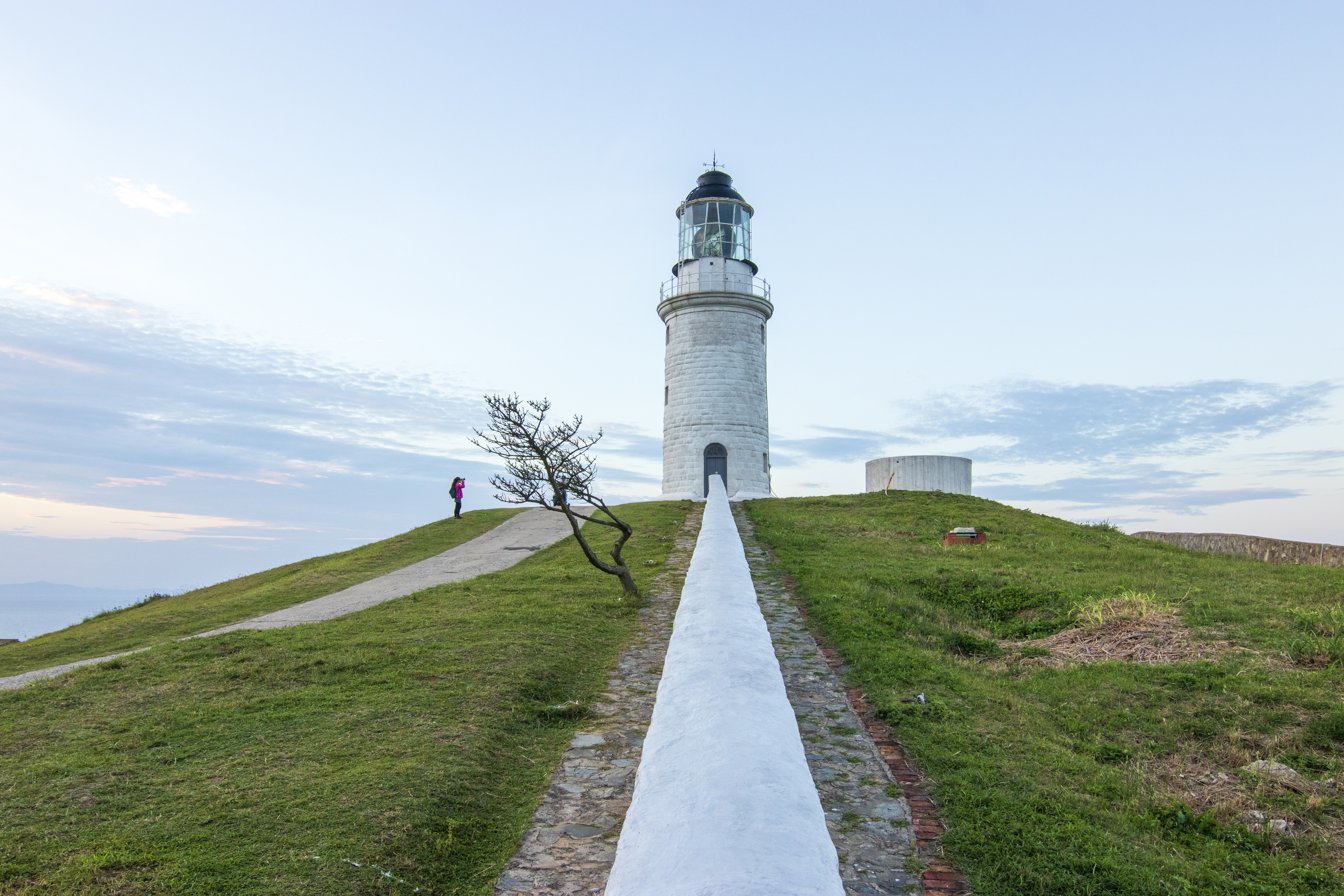
Dongquan Lighthouse

The lighthouse was built by the British Empire in 1872 to guide ships to Fuzhou during the Qing Dynasty when they were forced to open up along with four other treaty ports for trading. It was designated as a second-grade historic site in 1988 by the Ministry of the Interior. Until 2013, the lighthouse came under the administration of Customs Administration of the Ministry of Finance before it was changed to Maritime and Port Bureau of the Ministry of Transportation and Communications.

== Architecture ==
The lighthouse is connected to the office annex building via a 30-meter long windbreak wall.

== Features ==
The lighthouse features the Lighthouse Museum, opened in the English-style building in June 2008. An artist-in-residence program based at the lighthouse was established in June 2019.

== Technical specification ==
It can cast a beam of light that can be seen up to 16.7 nautical miles away.

== See also ==
- List of lighthouses in Taiwan
- List of tourist attractions in Taiwan
