= Hsueh Hsiang-chuan =

Taiwanese biochemist and politician

- 薛香川
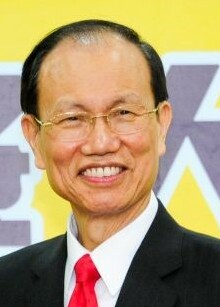

Governor of Fujian Province
- In office 20 May 2008 – 10 September 2009
- Preceded by: Chen Chin-jun
- Succeeded by: James Hsueh

Secretary-General of the Executive Yuan
- In office 20 May 2008 – 10 September 2009
- Preceded by: Chen Chin-jun
- Succeeded by: Lin Join-sane

Personal details
- Born: 12 December 1944 (age 81)
- Party: Kuomintang
- Education: National Taiwan University (BS); University of Wisconsin–Madison (MS, PhD)

Hsueh Hsiang-chuan (Chinese: 薛香川; pinyin: Xuē Xiāngchuān; born 12 December 1944) is a Taiwanese biochemist and politician. He was the Secretary-General of the Executive Yuan in 2008–2009.

== Education ==
After graduating from National Fengshan Senior High School, Hsueh studied chemistry as an undergraduate at National Taiwan University and graduated with a Bachelor of Science (B.S.) in chemistry. He then completed doctoral studies in the United States, where he earned a Master of Science (M.S.) and his Ph.D. in biochemistry from the University of Wisconsin–Madison.

== Executive Yuan ==
=== Secretary-general resignation ===
Hsueh resigned from Executive Yuan secretary-general post with the other cabinet members of Executive Yuan following the slow disaster response after Typhoon Morakot hit Taiwan in August 2009.
