= Kinmen-Matsu Joint Services Center =

Government agency of the Republic of China

- 行政院金馬聯合服務中心; Xíngzhènyuàn Jīnmǎ Liánhé Fúwù Zhōngxīn
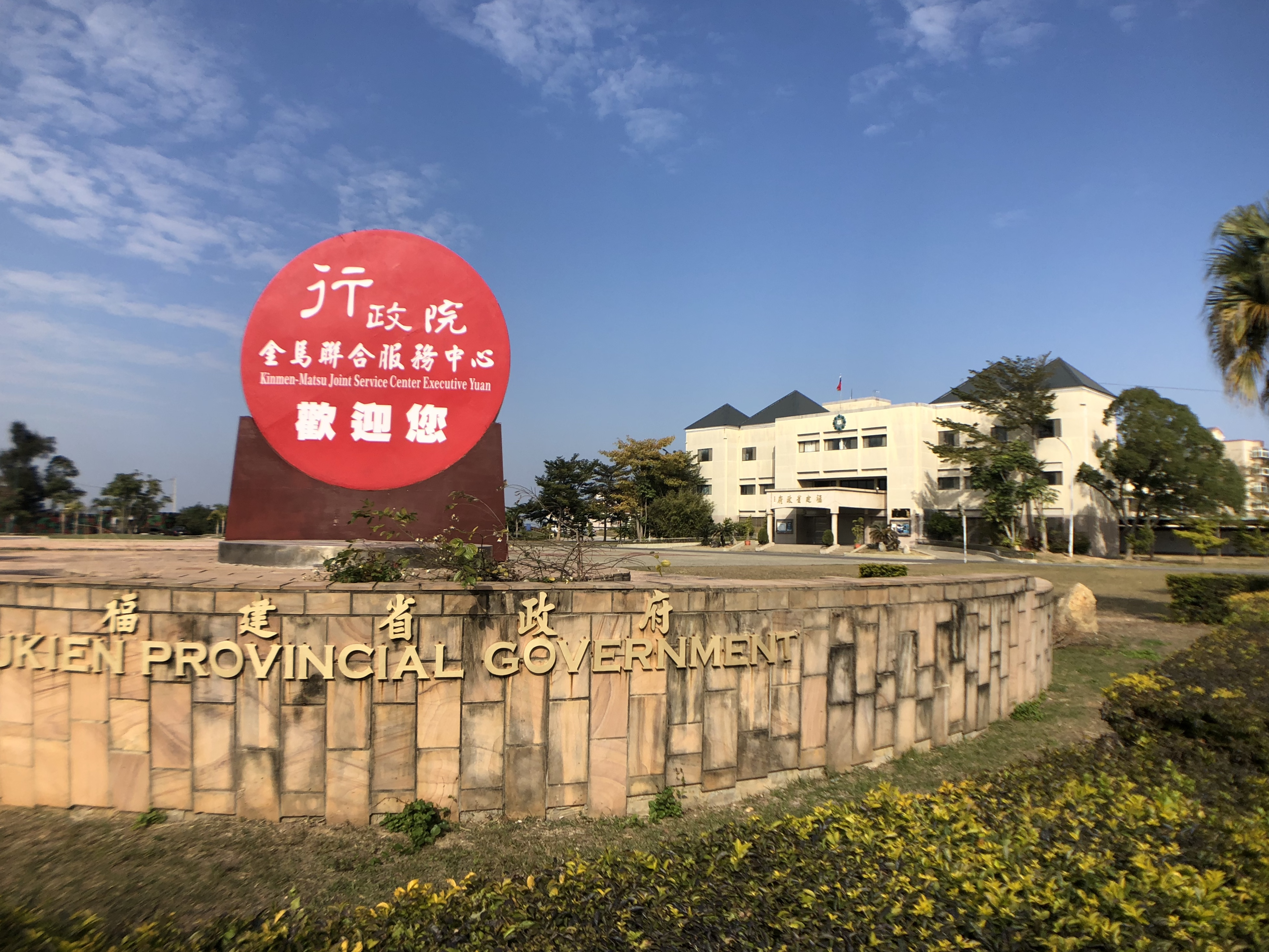

Agency overview
- Formed: 17 January 2017
- Preceding agency: Fukien Provincial Government
- Jurisdiction: Kinmen and Lienchiang counties
- Headquarters: Jincheng, Kinmen, Republic of China; 24°25′55.1″N 118°18′38.9″E
- Agency executive: Chang Ching-sen, Director
- Parent agency: Executive Yuan
- Website: Official website

Kinmen-Matsu Joint Services Center
- Traditional Chinese: 行政院金馬聯合服務中心
- Simplified Chinese: 行政院金马联合服务中心
- Literal meaning: Golden Horse Joint Service Center of the Executive Yuan
Transcriptions
Standard Mandarin
- Hanyu Pinyin: Xíngzhènyuàn Jīnmǎ Liánhé Fúwù Zhōngxīn
- Wade–Giles: Hsing-cheng-yüan Chin-ma Lien-ho Fu-wu Chung-hsin
Southern Min
- Hokkien POJ: Hêng-chèng-īⁿ Kim-má Liân-ha̍p Ho̍k-bū Tiong-sim

The Kinmen-Matsu Joint Services Center is the agency of the Executive Yuan serving as the local branch government governing the counties of Kinmen and Lienchiang (Matsu Islands).

== History ==
The agency was inaugurated on 17 January 2017 as the successor agency to the Fukien Provincial Government in a ceremony officiated by Premier Lin Chuan in Kinmen.

On 1 July 2018, by a resolution passed during the 3606th meeting of the Executive Yuan, all the remaining duties of the Provincial Government were transferred to the National Development Council and other ministries of the Executive Yuan. The transformations were scheduled to be done before the end of the year 2018.

== Director ==
- Chang Ching-sen (17 January 2017–)

== See also ==
- Kinmen County Government
- Matsu Islands
- Lienchiang County Council
