= Chen Chin-jun =

Taiwanese politician

- 陳景峻
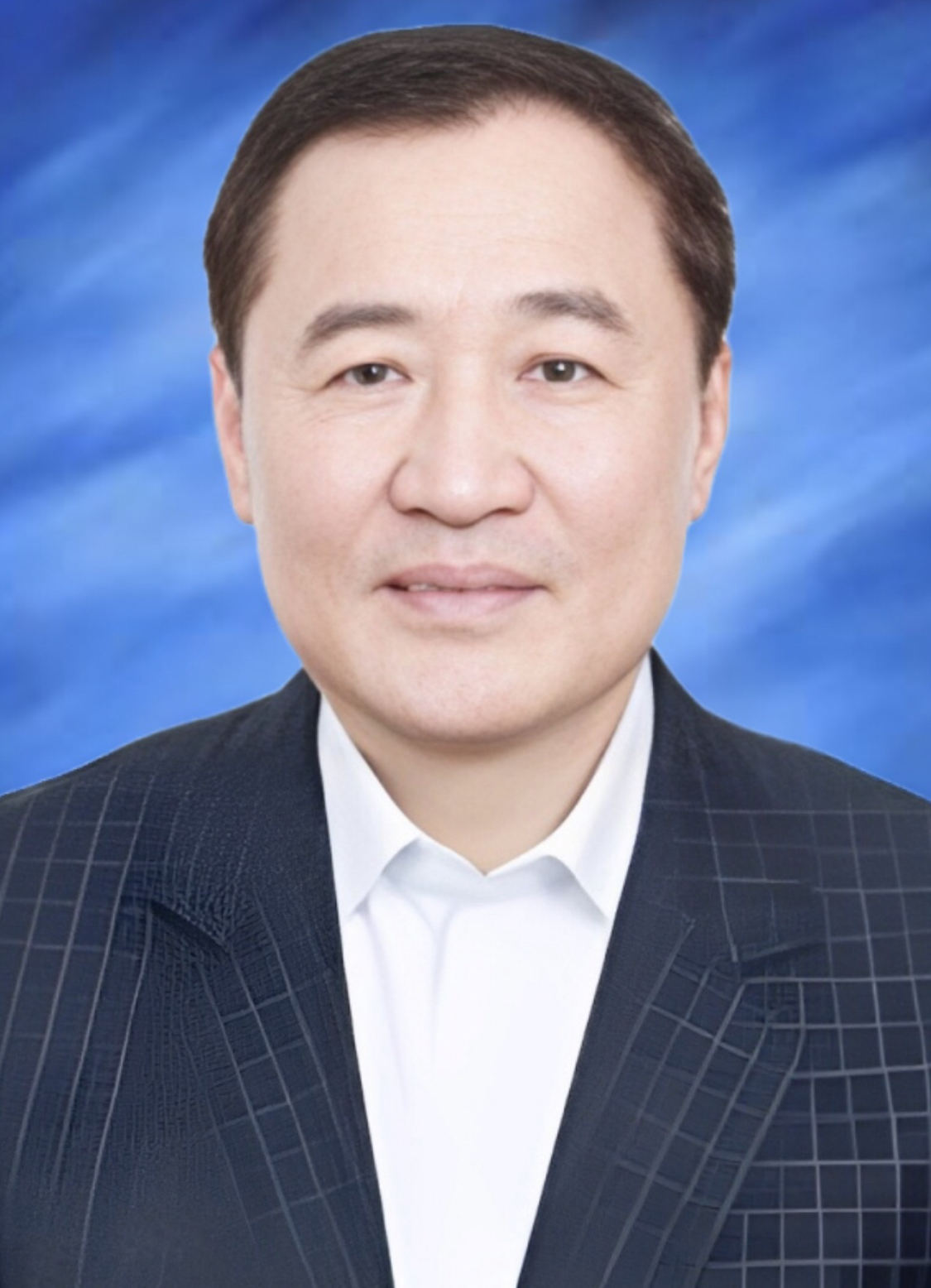

Member of the Control Yuan
- Incumbent
- Assumed office 1 August 2020
- President: Tsai Ing-wen

Secretary-General of the Executive Yuan
- In office 21 May 2007 – 20 May 2008
- Preceded by: Liu Yuh-san
- Succeeded by: Hsueh Hsiang-chuan

Governor of Fujian Province
- In office 28 November 2007 – 20 May 2008
- Preceded by: Yen Chung-cheng; Yang Cheng-hsi (acting)
- Succeeded by: Hsueh Hsiang-chuan

Member of the Legislative Yuan
- In office 1 February 1999 – 20 May 2007
- Constituency: Taipei County 2

Personal details
- Born: 15 June 1956 (age 69)
- Party: Democratic Progressive Party
- Education: Chinese Culture University (BA); National Taiwan University (MA)

Chen Chin-jun (traditional Chinese: 陳景峻; simplified Chinese: 陈景峻; pinyin: Chén Jǐngjùn; born 15 June 1956) is a Taiwanese politician. He was the Secretary-General of the Executive Yuan from 2007 to 2008.

== Executive Yuan secretary-general ==
=== Thoughts on campaigning ===
In September 2007, Chen said that appointed government officials should concentrate to their own work rather than spend time campaigning for others. To cut down on the effect of constant campaigning, Chen announced that a new electoral system would be used after 10 October 2007. The first nationwide election to be affected by this change was the legislative election of 2008. It would utilize single-member districts and first-past-the-post voting. Additionally, the number of representatives elected to the Legislative Yuan was halved from 225 to 113.

=== Allegations of corruption ===
In April 2008, after the news that Huang Fu-yuan, the Director of Taiwan Power Company (Taipower) North Branch, allegedly committed bribery by handing out NT$20 million to ensure his promotion to the position of Vice President of Taipower, Economic Affairs Minister Steve Chen for the first time admitted in the Legislative Yuan that it was Chen Chin-jun who recommended Huang and that also many people were in support of the appointment. Chen however responded that although many people recommended Huang for the position, he only conveyed the message to the Ministry.

In 2011, Chen and two others were found guilty of corruption for their actions in the 2008 legislative elections. The Taipei District Court ruled that Chen, former Veteran Affairs Commission Secretary-General Cha Tai-chen and then deputy defense minister Hu Chen-pu had accepted donations from RPTL International, Ltd., a company that the VAC owned. The money was used to fund four legislative candidates, Yu Tian, Lin Yu-fang, Huang Chung-yung, and Kao Chin Su-mei. Chen was sentenced to seven years and ten months in prison and denied public and electoral rights for three years.

== Deputy mayor of Taipei ==
Ko Wen-je named Chen a deputy mayor of Taipei in February 2016, to replace Chou Li-fang, who had resigned. In October 2017, Chen announced that he would stand in the 2018 local elections to contest the New Taipei City mayoralty. Opinion polls showed that Chen had a low approval rating, and the Democratic Progressive Party eventually nominated Su Tseng-chang. Chen remained in his post as deputy mayor of Taipei until December 2018, resigning days before Ko Wen-je began his second mayoral term.
