= Fuchien (Republic of China province) =

De jure administrative division of Taiwan

Fuchien 福建省
- Province

Name transcription(s)
  - Chinese: 福建省 (Fújiàn Shěng)
  - Abbreviation: FJ / 閩 (pinyin: Mǐn, Tâi-lô: Bân)
  - Foochow: Hók-gióng
  - Hokkien POJ: Hok-kiàn
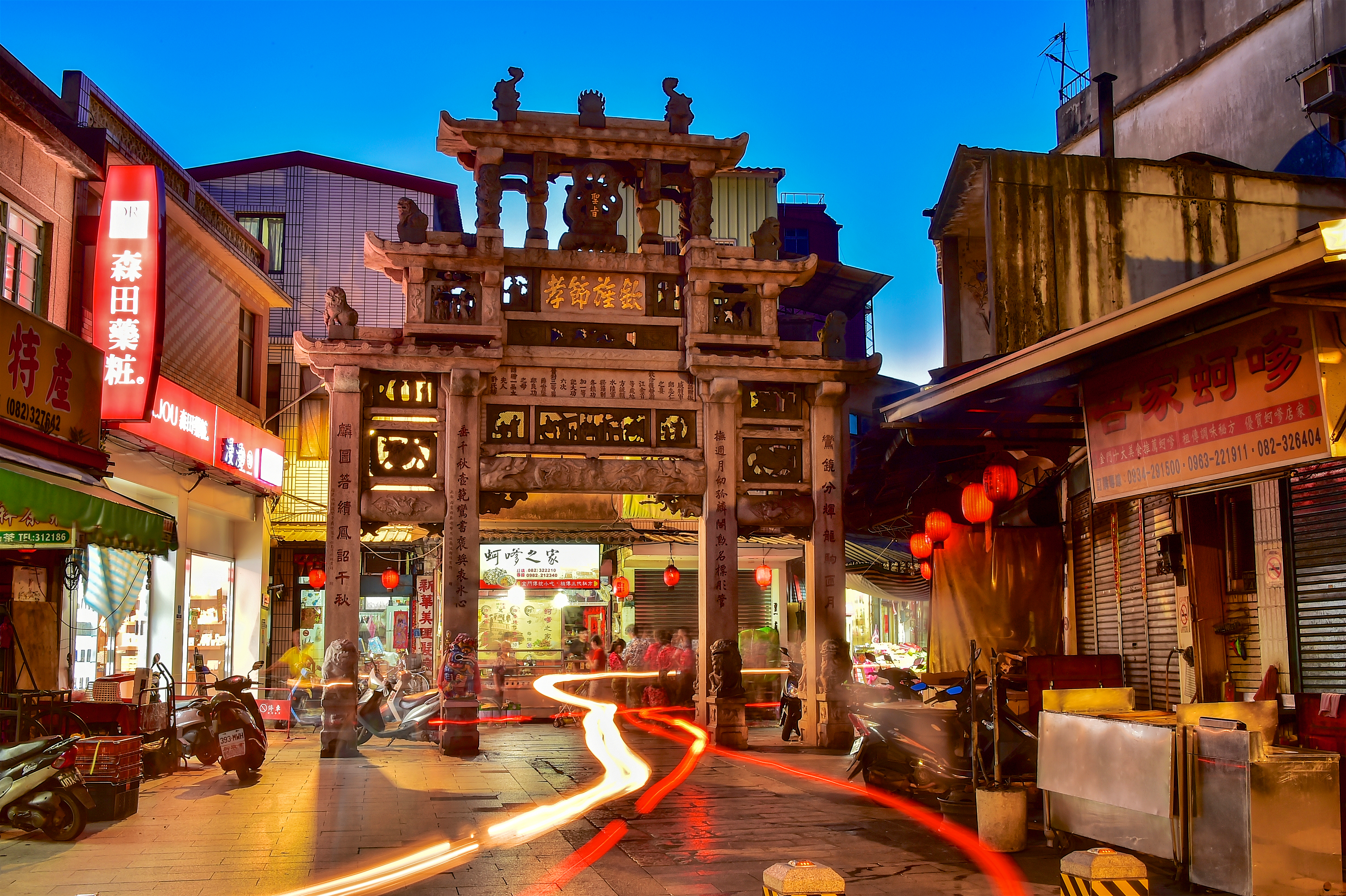
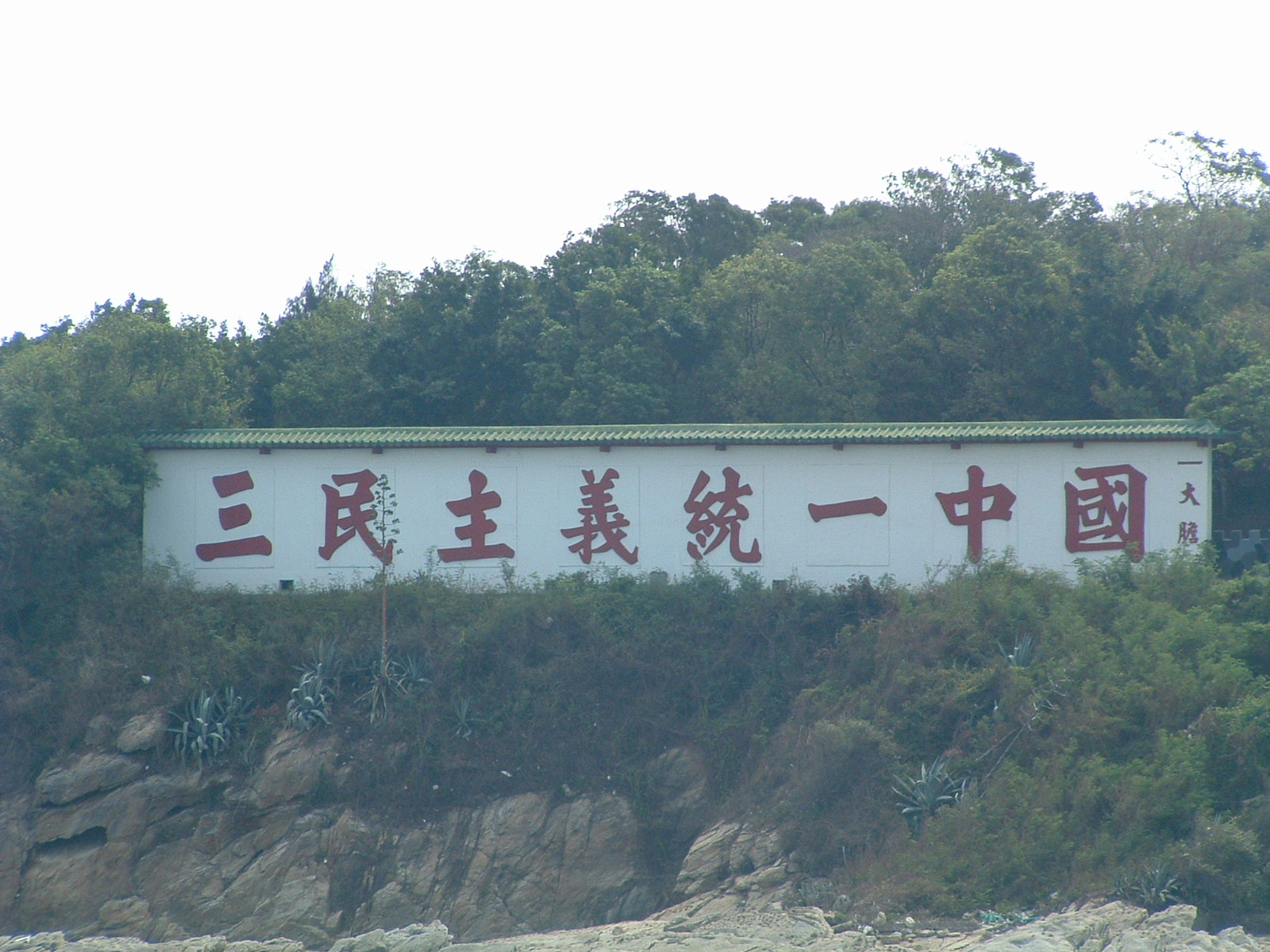
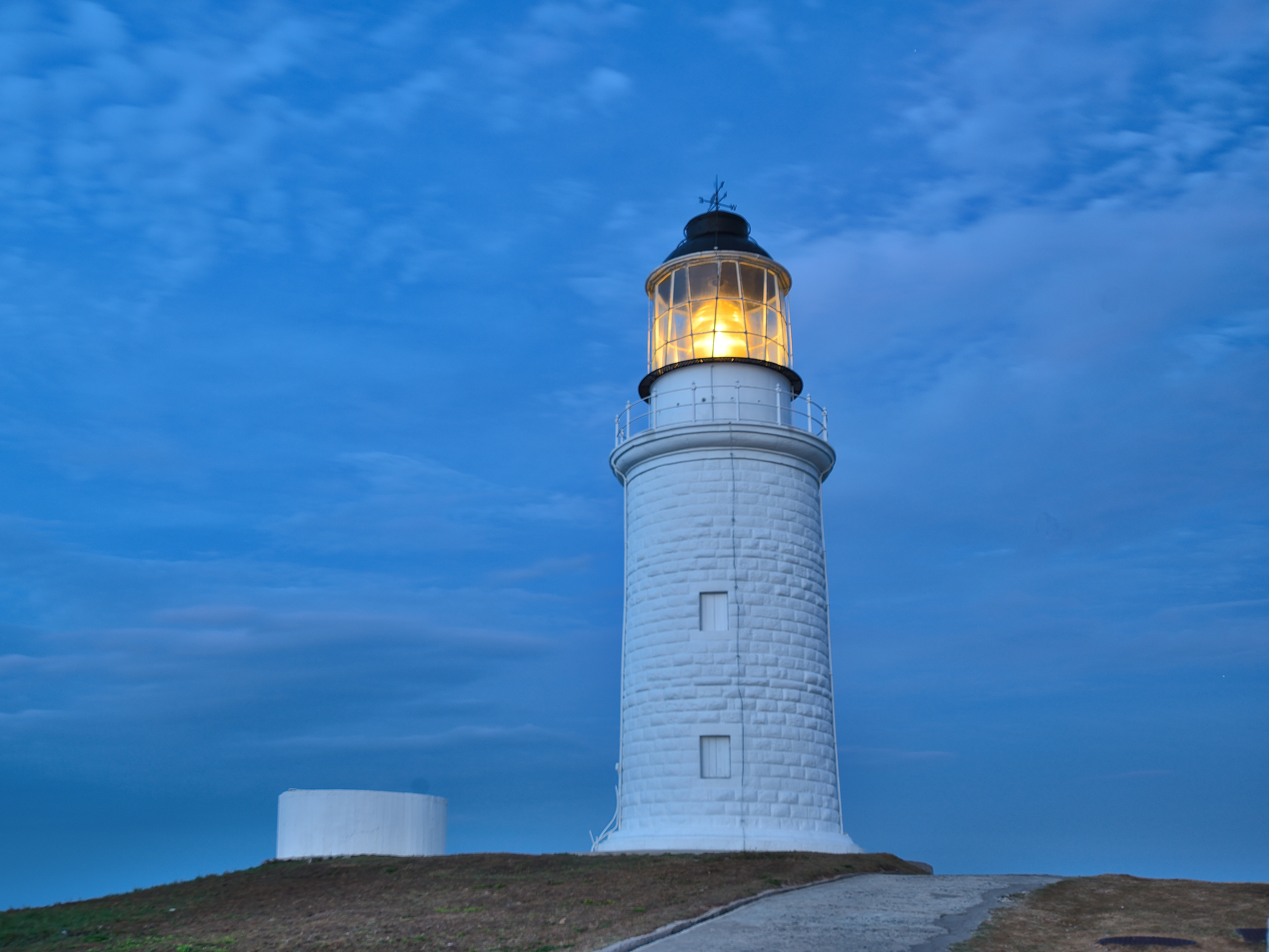
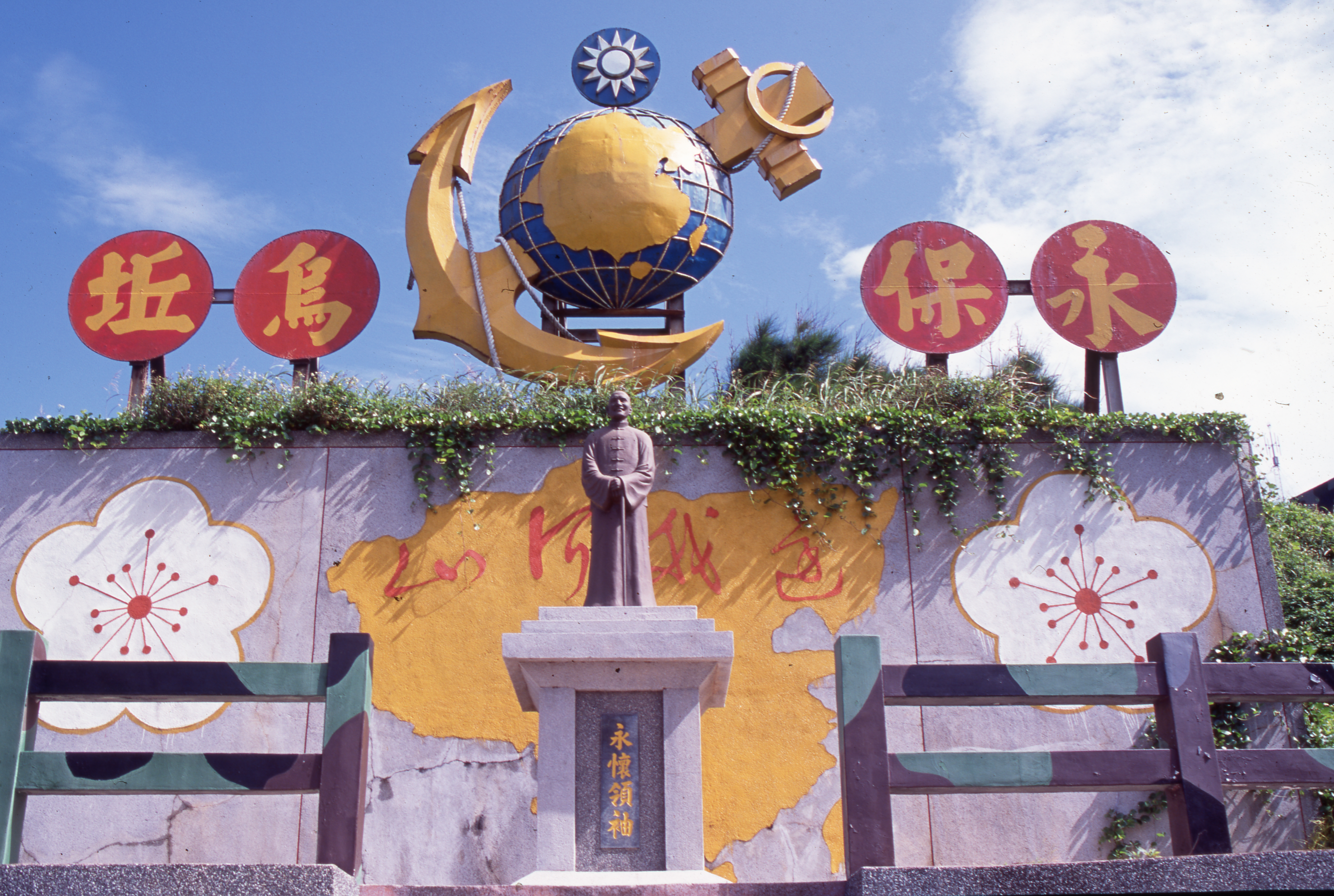
- Chastity Arch for Qiu Liang-gong's Mother Banner of Three People's Principles Unifying China Dongquan Lighthouse Wuqiu, Kinmen

- Seal of Fuchien Province

- Map showing the de facto territories under the nominal province (red)
- Coordinates: 24°25′N 118°19′E
- Country: Republic of China
- As a province of the Republic of China: 1912
- Division of Fujian following the Chinese Civil War: 1949
- Streamlined: July 16, 1956
- Demilitarized: November 7, 1992
- Provincial Government abolished: December 31, 2018
- Named for: 福 Fú: Fuzhou; 建 Jiàn: Jianzhou
- Provincial capital: Foochow (claimed, de jure) (Note: Minhou (1912–1938); Yong'an (1938–1945); Foochow (Minhou) (1945–present); De facto seats after 1949: Jincheng, Kinmen (1949–1956); Hsintien, Taipei Hsien, Taiwan Prov. (1956–1996); Jincheng, Kinmen (1996–2018); Note: The Provincial government was dissolved in July 2018. The Kinmen-Matsu Joint Services Center, located in Jincheng, Kinmen, substitutes its administrative functions as local agency of the Executive Yuan.)
- Largest city: Jincheng, Kinmen
- Divisions: 2 counties (de facto); 67 counties, 2 cities (in 1949)

Government
  - Type: Province (nominal)
  - Body: Fuchien Provincial Government (1927–2018, now de jure) (Note: Dissolved in July 2018.)

Area
  - 1948: 119,340 km^{2} (46,080 sq mi)
  - 2018: 180.4560 km^{2} (69.6745 sq mi)

Population (2020)
  - Total: 153,876
- Demonym(s): Fukienese, Kinmenese, Matsunese

Demographics
  - Languages and dialects: Min, Mandarin
- Time zone: UTC+08:00 (Asia/Taipei)
- Postal code: 209–212, 890–896
- Area codes: (0)82, (0)826, (0)836
- ISO 3166 code: TW
- Website: FKPG.gov.tw

Fuchien
- "Fuchien" in Chinese characters
- Chinese: 福建
- Postal: Fukien
- Literal meaning: "Fú(zhōu) and Jiàn(zhōu)"
Transcriptions
Standard Mandarin
- Hanyu Pinyin: Fújiàn
- Bopomofo: ㄈㄨˊ ㄐㄧㄢˋ
- Gwoyeu Romatzyh: Fwujiann
- Wade–Giles: Fu²-chien⁴
- Tongyong Pinyin: Fújiàn
- Yale Romanization: Fújyàn
- MPS2: Fújiàn
- IPA: [fǔ.tɕjɛ̂n]
Wu
- Romanization: Foh-ji
Hakka
- Pha̍k-fa-sṳ: Fuk-kien or Fuk-kian
Yue: Cantonese
- Yale Romanization: Fūkgin
- Jyutping: Fuk1gin3
- IPA: [fʊk̚˥.kin˧]
Southern Min
- Hokkien POJ: Hok-kiàn
- Tâi-lô: Hok-kiàn
Eastern Min
- Fuzhou BUC: Hók-gióng
Pu-Xian Min
- Hinghwa BUC: Ho̤h-ge̤̍ng
Northern Min
- Jian'ou Romanized: Hŭ-gṳ̿in.g

Abbreviation
- Traditional Chinese: 閩
- Simplified Chinese: 闽
- Literal meaning: [the Mǐn River]
Transcriptions
Standard Mandarin
- Hanyu Pinyin: Mǐn
- Bopomofo: ㄇㄧㄣˇ
- Gwoyeu Romatzyh: Miin
- Wade–Giles: Min³
- Tongyong Pinyin: Mǐn
- Yale Romanization: Mǐn
- MPS2: Mǐn
- IPA: [mìn]
Hakka
- Pha̍k-fa-sṳ: Mén
Yue: Cantonese
- Yale Romanization: Máhn
- Jyutping: Man5
- IPA: [mɐn˩˧]
Southern Min
- Hokkien POJ: Bân
- Tâi-lô: Bân
Eastern Min
- Fuzhou BUC: Mìng
Pu-Xian Min
- Hinghwa BUC: Máng
Northern Min
- Jian'ou Romanized: Mâing

Fujian Province
- Chinese: 福建省
Transcriptions
Standard Mandarin
- Hanyu Pinyin: Fújiàn Shěng
- Bopomofo: ㄈㄨˊ ㄐㄧㄢˋ ㄕㄥˇ
- Gwoyeu Romatzyh: Fwujiann Sheeng
- Wade–Giles: Fu²-chien⁴ Shêng³
- Tongyong Pinyin: Fújiàn Shěng
- Yale Romanization: Fújyàn Shěng
- MPS2: Fújiàn Shěng
- IPA: [fǔ.tɕjɛ̂n ʂə̀ŋ]
Hakka
- Pha̍k-fa-sṳ: Fuk-kien-sén or Fuk-kian-sén
Yue: Cantonese
- Yale Romanization: Fūkgin Sáang
- Jyutping: Fuk1gin3 Saang2
- IPA: [fʊk̚˥.kin˧ saŋ˧˥]
Southern Min
- Hokkien POJ: Hok-kiàn-séng
- Tâi-lô: Hok-kiàn-síng
Eastern Min
- Fuzhou BUC: Hók-gióng sēng

Historical location of Fujian Province in the Republic of China (1912–1949)

Fuchien (Note: In local languages: Traditional Chinese script: 福建; Mandarin Pinyin: Fújiàn; Hokkien: Hok-kiàn; Matsu: Hók-gióng) (Mandarin pronunciation: [fǔ.tɕjɛ̂n]), formerly romanized as Fukien, is an administrative division (or province) of the Republic of China (Taiwan), whose constitution retains provinces as a titular division with no practical administrative function.

The province encompasses three small archipelagos off the coast of Fujian Province of the People's Republic of China, namely the Matsu Islands, which make up Lienchiang County; Kinmen and Wuqiu Islands, which make up Kinmen County. Its administrative center is the Kinmen-Matsu Joint Services Center in Jincheng, Kinmen, serving as its de facto capital. The province is also known as the Golden Horse (Chinese: 金馬; pinyin: jīnmǎ; Pe̍h-ōe-jī: Kim-bé), after the literal reading of the Chinese character abbreviation for "Kinmen-Matsu".

The People's Republic of China gained control of the mainland portion of the province in 1949 during the Chinese Civil War, and the islands are the only part left that remain ROC-controlled. The islands were under military administration during the Cold War; travel restrictions were not lifted until 1992. Provincial administration was transferred to the national and county governments in 1998 following government reforms, and the provincial government was abolished in 2018.

== History ==
=== Imperial China ===
The Han dynasty collapsed at the end of the 2nd century AD, paving the way for the Three Kingdoms era. Sun Quan, the founder of the Kingdom of Wu, spent nearly twenty years subduing the Shan Yue people, the branch of the Yue living in mountains.

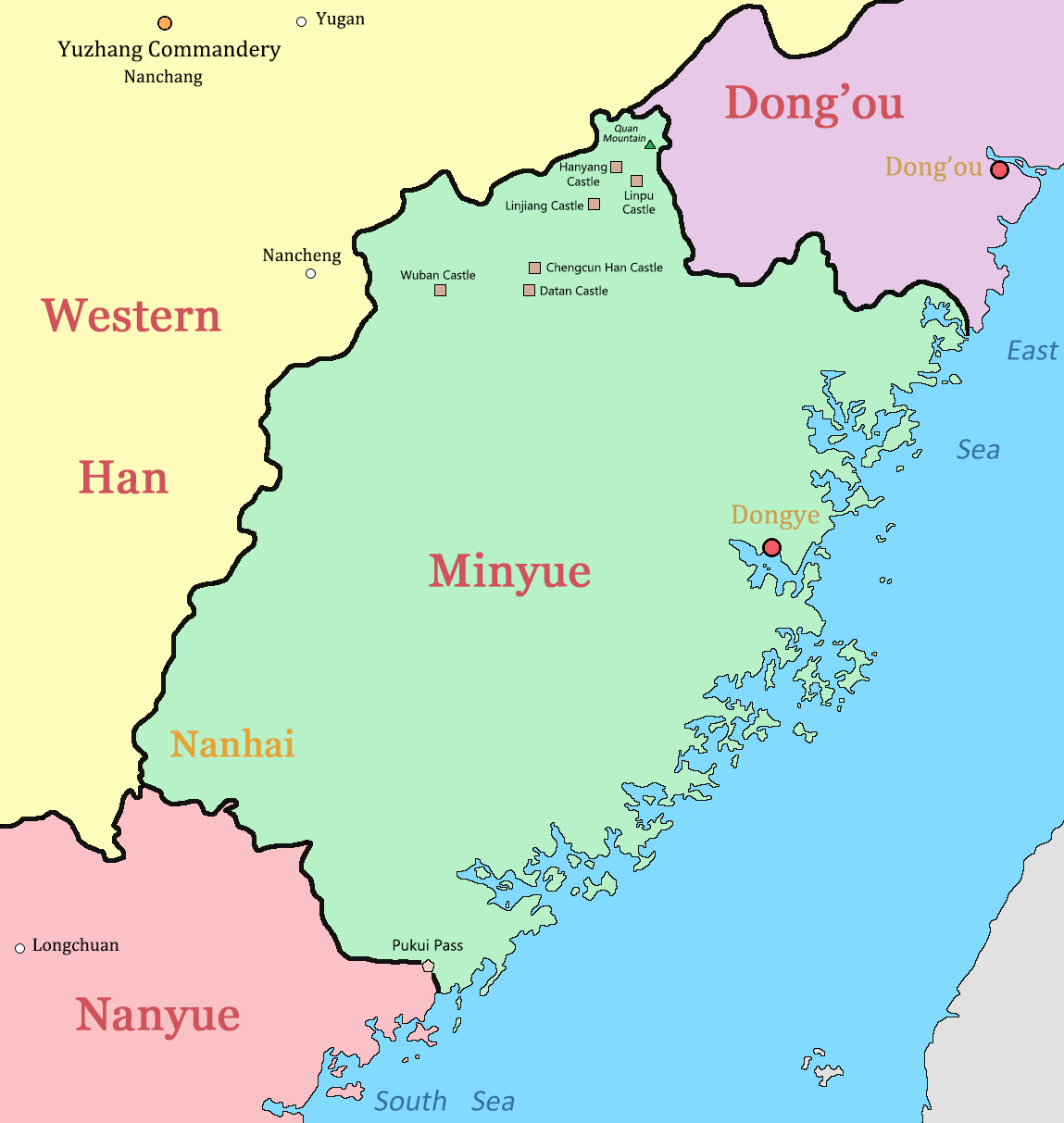
Map of Minyue

Fuchien was also where the kingdom of Minyue was located. The word "Mǐnyuè" was derived by combining "Mǐn" (Chinese: 閩; Pe̍h-ōe-jī: bân), which is perhaps an ethnic name (Chinese: 蠻; pinyin: mán; Pe̍h-ōe-jī: bân), and "Yuè", after the State of Yue, a Spring and Autumn period kingdom in Zhejiang to the north. This is because the royal family of Yuè fled to Fujian after its kingdom was annexed by the State of Chu in 306 BC. Mǐn is also the name of the main river in this area, but the ethnonym is probably older.

The first wave of immigration of the noble class arrived in the province in the early 4th century when the Western Jin dynasty collapsed and the north was torn apart by invasions by nomadic peoples from the north, as well as civil war. These immigrants were primarily from eight families in central China: Lin (林), Huang (黃), Chen (陳), Zheng (鄭), Zhan (詹), Qiu (邱), He (何), and Hu (胡). The first four remain as the major surnames of the province.

Historically, population density in Fujian remained relatively low due to its relative isolation; only two commanderies and sixteen counties were established by the Western Jin dynasty. Like other southern provinces at that time, the province often served as a destination for exiled prisoners and dissidents at that time.

The Tang dynasty (618–907) oversaw the next golden age of China. As the Tang dynasty ended, China was torn apart in the period of the Five Dynasties and Ten Kingdoms. During this time, a second major wave of immigration arrived therein, led by General Wang, who set up an independent Kingdom of Min with its capital in Fuzhou. After the death of the founding king, however, the kingdom suffered from internal strife, and was soon swallowed up by Southern Tang, another southern kingdom.

Quanzhou was blooming into a seaport under the reign of the Min Kingdom, and is the largest seaport in the world. Its population is also greater than Fuzhou. Due to the Ispah Rebellion, Quanzhou was severely damaged. In the early Ming dynasty, Quanzhou was the staging area and supply depot of Zheng He's naval expeditions. Further development was severely hampered by the sea trade ban of the Ming dynasty, and the area was superseded by nearby ports of Guangzhou, Hangzhou, Ningbo and Shanghai despite the lifting of the ban in 1550. Large scale piracy by Wokou (Japanese pirates) was eventually wiped out by Chinese military and Japanese authority of Toyotomi Hideyoshi.

=== Qing Dynasty ===
Late Ming and early Qing dynasty heralded an era of large influx of refugees and another 20 years of sea trade ban under the Kangxi Emperor, a measure intended to counter the refuge Ming government of Koxinga in Taiwan. Incoming refugees, however, did not translate into a sizable workforce owing to their remigration to prosperous Cantonese regions. In 1683, the Qing dynasty conquered Taiwan and annexed it into Fujian province, as Taiwan Prefecture. Settlement of Taiwan by Han Chinese followed, and the majority of people in Taiwan are descendants of Hoklo people from Southern Fujian. Fujian arrived at its present extent after Taiwan was split as its own province in 1885. Shortly thereafter, Taiwan Province would be lost to Japan due to the Qing losing the First Sino-Japanese War which ended in 1895.

=== Republic of China ===
==== Mainland Period ====
The Xinhai Revolution that deposed the Qing dynasty brought the province into the rule of the Republic of China. Fujian briefly gained independence from China again under the Fujian People's Government until it was recontrolled by the ROC during the Warlord Era.

Parts of the province in the northwestern area of Fujian were controlled by the Jiangxi–Fujian Soviet, a component territory controlled by the Chinese Soviet Republic until its collapse in 1934 at the start of the Long March.

It came under Japanese sea blockade during Second Sino-Japanese War.

==== Since 1949 ====
During the late stages of the Chinese Civil War, the ROC lost control of mainland China, including most of Fujian province, and was forced to relocate to Taiwan, while the victorious Chinese Communist forces established the PRC in 1949, subsequently the provincial government of Fujian was also moved from Foochow to Jincheng. In the Battle of Guningtou, however, ROC forces were able to defend the island of Quemoy (Kinmen) just off the coast of Fujian from communist attack. As a result, the ROC has been able to hold on to a number of offshore islands of Fujian, and has continued to maintain a separate Fujian Provincial Government to govern these islands, parallel to the province of Fujian in mainland China.

In 1956, due to heightened potential for military conflict with the PRC, the ROC central government moved the Fujian provincial government out of Fujian to within Taiwan Province in Xindian (now part of New Taipei), and the islands were placed under an extraordinarily tight military administration due to their extreme proximity to mainland China. This was an unusual situation where the government of a province was located and operating in a different province. With the easing of cross-strait relations between the PRC and ROC and the democratization of the ROC in the 1990s, the islands were returned to civilian government in 1992. On January 15, 1996, the provincial government moved back to Kinmen, on Fujian soil.

Beginning in 2010, the ROC significantly diluted the powers of the two provinces it governs, namely Taiwan and Fujian. Most of the authority at the Fujian province level has been delegated to the two county governments of Kinmen and Lienchiang.

== Government ==
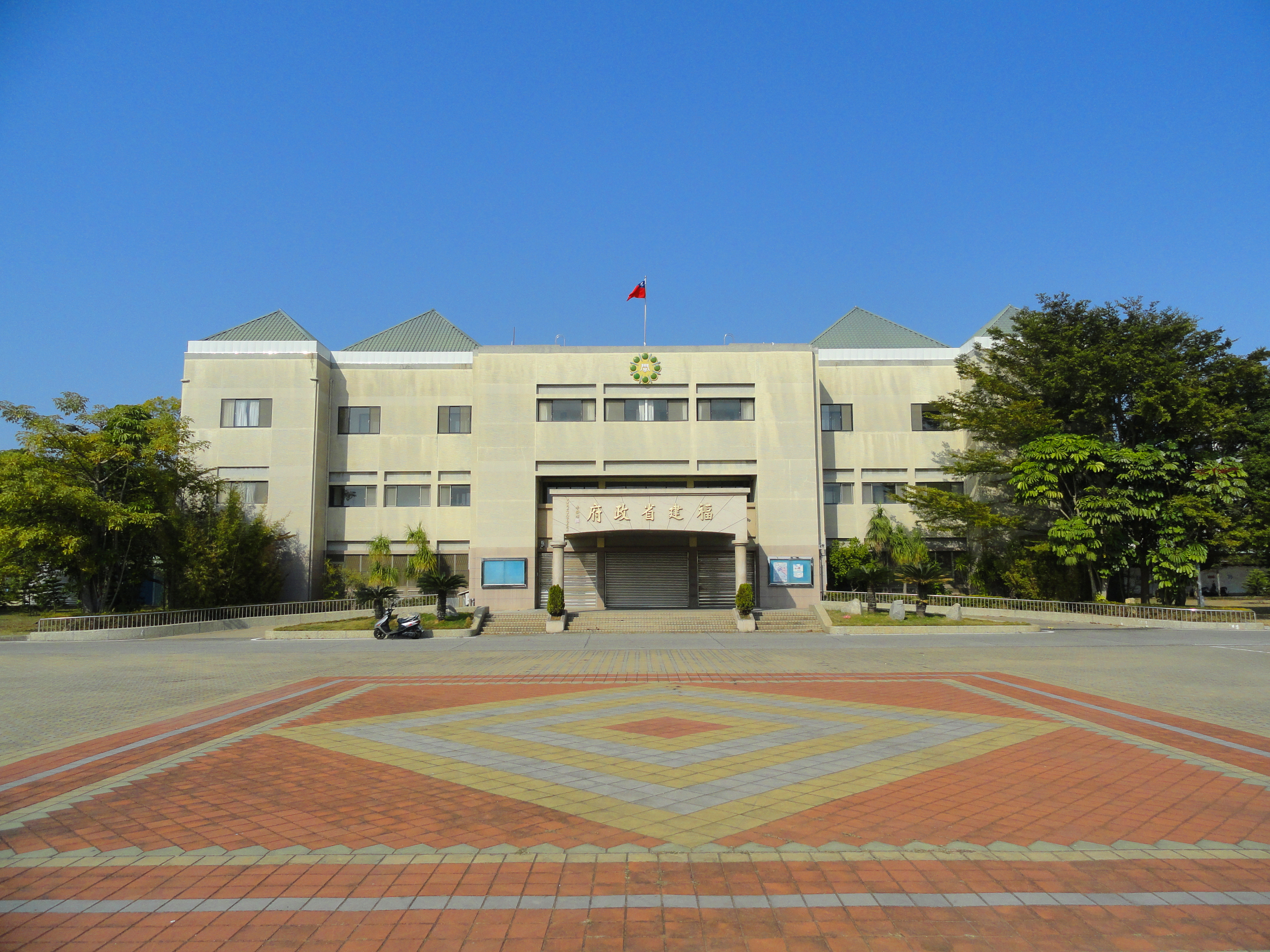
Former Fujian Provincial Government building, now used by the Kinmen-Matsu Joint Services Center.

The Governor of Fujian Province was the head of the Fujian Provincial Government, the governor was also titled the "Chairperson of the Fujian Provincial Government". According to the Additional Articles of the Constitution, the governor was appointed by the central government.

The Fujian Provincial Government was located in Jincheng, Kinmen between January 1996 and 2018.

Provincial administration was transferred to counties and the national-level National Development Council in 1998, with the transition occurring in 1999 and 2000. This followed 1997 constitutional reforms to downsize provincial governments. The provincial government was reduced to a local interface for the national government with appointed rather than elected officers; it became dormant when the remaining staff and responsibilities were transferred in 2018.

The Kinmen-Matsu Joint Services Center was founded in 2017 as the local government office handling administration of the islands. It took over the remaining responsibilities of the provincial government.

== Subdivisions ==
Fujian province nominally comprises two counties: Kinmen County and Lienchiang County. These islands have a total area of 182.66 km^{2} (70.53 sq mi) and a total population of 71,000 (2001).

The following are the islands of Fujian under the administration of the ROC, given by county:

Name	Kinmen County	Lienchiang County
Chinese	金門縣	連江縣
Taiwanese Hokkien	Kim-mn̂g-kuān	Liân-kang-kuān
Hakka	Kîm-mùn-yen	Lièn-kông-yen
Matsunese	Gĭng-muòng-gâing	Lièng-gŏng-gâing
Wuqiunese	Ging-meóng-gā̤ⁿ	Léng-gang-gā̤ⁿ
Flag		
Map		
Islands	numerous islands and islets	36 islands
Islands	Kinmen Islands (金門列島); Kinmen (金門島); Lesser Kinmen (小金門島); Dadan (大膽島); Erdan (二膽島); Dongding (東碇島); Beiding (北碇島); Jiangong (建功嶼); Binlang Islet (檳榔嶼); Fuxing Islet (復興嶼); Menghu Islet (猛虎嶼); Shi Islet (獅嶼); Wuqiu Islands (烏坵嶼); Daqiu (大坵嶼); Xiaoqiu (小坵嶼)	Matsu Islands (馬祖列島); Nangan (南竿島); Beigan (北竿島); Dongju (東莒島); Xiju (西莒島); Dongyin (東引島); Xiyin (西引島); Gaodeng Island (高登島); Daqiu Island (大坵島); Liang Island (亮島); Turtle Island (龜島)
Administrative divisions	6 townships	4 townships

The PRC claims Kinmen as a county of Quanzhou, Fujian and the Matsu Islands as a township of Lianjiang County, Fuzhou, Fujian (with some islands claimed as parts of other areas).

== Demography ==
The population is predominantly of Han Chinese. The language of Lienchiang County is the Fuzhou dialect of Eastern Min. (See Matsu dialect.) The language of Kinmen County is predominantly Hokkien (Quanzhou dialects), as on mainland Taiwan, though on the isolated Wuqiu islands, Puxian Min is spoken.

== Education ==
- National Quemoy University

== See also ==
- Taiwan Province
- Fujian
- Politics of the Republic of China
- Kinmen-Matsu Joint Services Center
- Battle of Kuningtou
- First Taiwan Strait Crisis
- Second Taiwan Strait Crisis
- Third Taiwan Strait Crisis
- Chekiang Province, Republic of China
