= List of islands in the East China Sea =

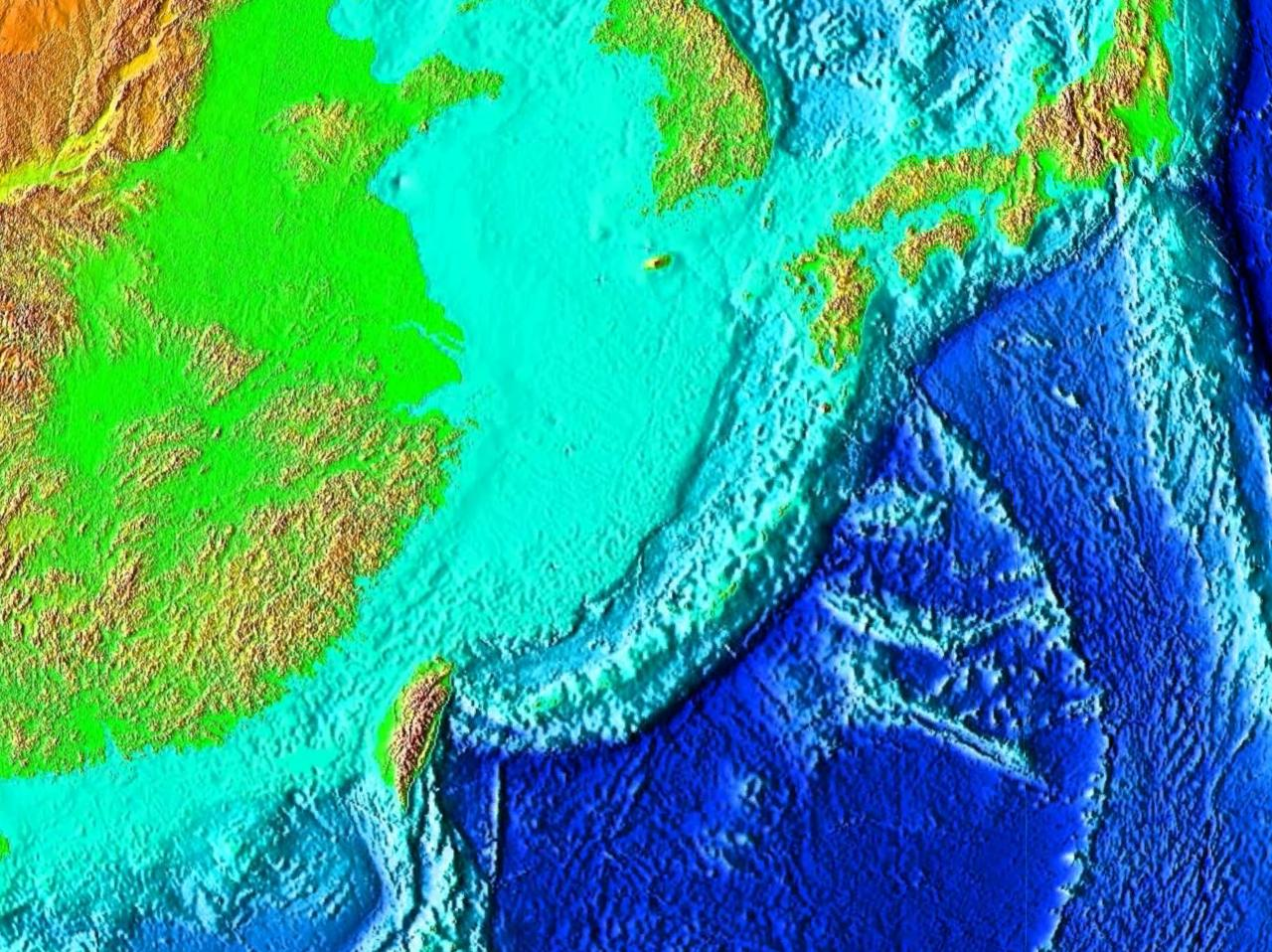
The East China Sea

Islands in the East China Sea include:

- Matsu Islands (29.61 km²)
  - Beigan (Peikan)
    - Gaodeng Island (Kaoteng Island)
    - Daqiu Island (大坵)
    - Liang Island (Lang Tao)
    - Xiaoqiu (Kiao Tse 小坵)
    - Wumingdao / Bluff Head (無名島)
    - Qiaotou (峭頭)
    - Jinyu (進嶼)
    - Langyan (浪岩)
    - Sanlianyu / Trio Rocks (三連嶼)
    - Zhongdao (中島)
    - Baimiao (白廟)
    - Laoshu (老鼠)
    - Turtle Island (亀島)
  - Nankan (Nangan)
  - Dongyin (Tungyin, Tung-yin, Tungyung, Tung Yung)
    - Xiyin (Hsiyin, Siyin)
    - Zhongzhu Island
    - Shuangzijiao
  - Chukuang (Jyuguang)
    - Tungchu (Dongjyu, Dongquan)
    - Hsichu (Xijyu, Xiquan)
    - Yongliou
- Ryukyu Islands (4,597.68 km²—Daitō Islands excluded)
  - Satsunan Islands
    - Ōsumi Islands:
      - Tanegashima, Yaku, Kuchinoerabu, Mageshima
      - Takeshima, Iōjima, Kuroshima
    - Tokara Islands: Kuchinoshima, Nakanoshima, Gajajima, Suwanosejima, Akusekijima, Tairajima, Kodakarajima, Takarajima
    - Amami Islands: Amami Ōshima, Kikaijima, Kakeromajima, Yoroshima, Ukeshima, Tokunoshima, Okinoerabujima, Yoronjima
  - Ryūkyū-shotō
    - Okinawa Islands: Okinawa Island, Kume, Iheya, Izena, Aguni, Ie (Iejima), Iwo Tori Shima (Iōtorishima)
      - Kerama Islands: Tokashiki, Zamami, Aka, Geruma
    - Sakishima Islands
      - Miyako Islands: Miyakojima, Ikema, Ōgami, Irabu, Shimoji, Kurima-jima, Minna, Tarama
      - Yaeyama Islands: Iriomote, Ishigaki, Taketomi, Kohama, Kuroshima, Aragusuku, Hatoma, Yubujima, Hateruma, Yonaguni
- Senkaku Islands (7 km²)
  - Uotsurijima, Kuba Jima, Taisho Jima, Kita Kojima, Minami Kojima, Oki-no-Kita-Iwa, Oki-no-Minami-Iwa, Tobise
- Zhoushan Archipelago (1,440.12 km²)
  - Zhoushan Island
  - Daishan Island
  - Liuheng Island
  - Jintang Island
  - Zhujiajian Island
  - Qushan Island
  - Mount Putuo
- Jeju Island (1,849 km²)
  - Marado
- Pengjia Islet (1.14 km²)
- Mianhua Islet and Pingfong Rock
- Huaping Islet

Total land area: 7,924.55 square kilometres

== See also ==
- List of islands
- List of islands in the Arctic Ocean
- List of islands in the Atlantic Ocean
- List of islands in the Caribbean
- List of islands in the Indian Ocean
- List of islands of Taiwan
- List of islands in the South China Sea
- List of islands of Antarctica and the Southern Ocean
- List of islands of Asia
- List of islands of Hong Kong
- List of islands of the People's Republic of China
