= War and Peace Memorial Park Exhibition Center =

Gallery in Beigan, Lienchiang, Taiwan

- 戰爭和平紀念公園主題館
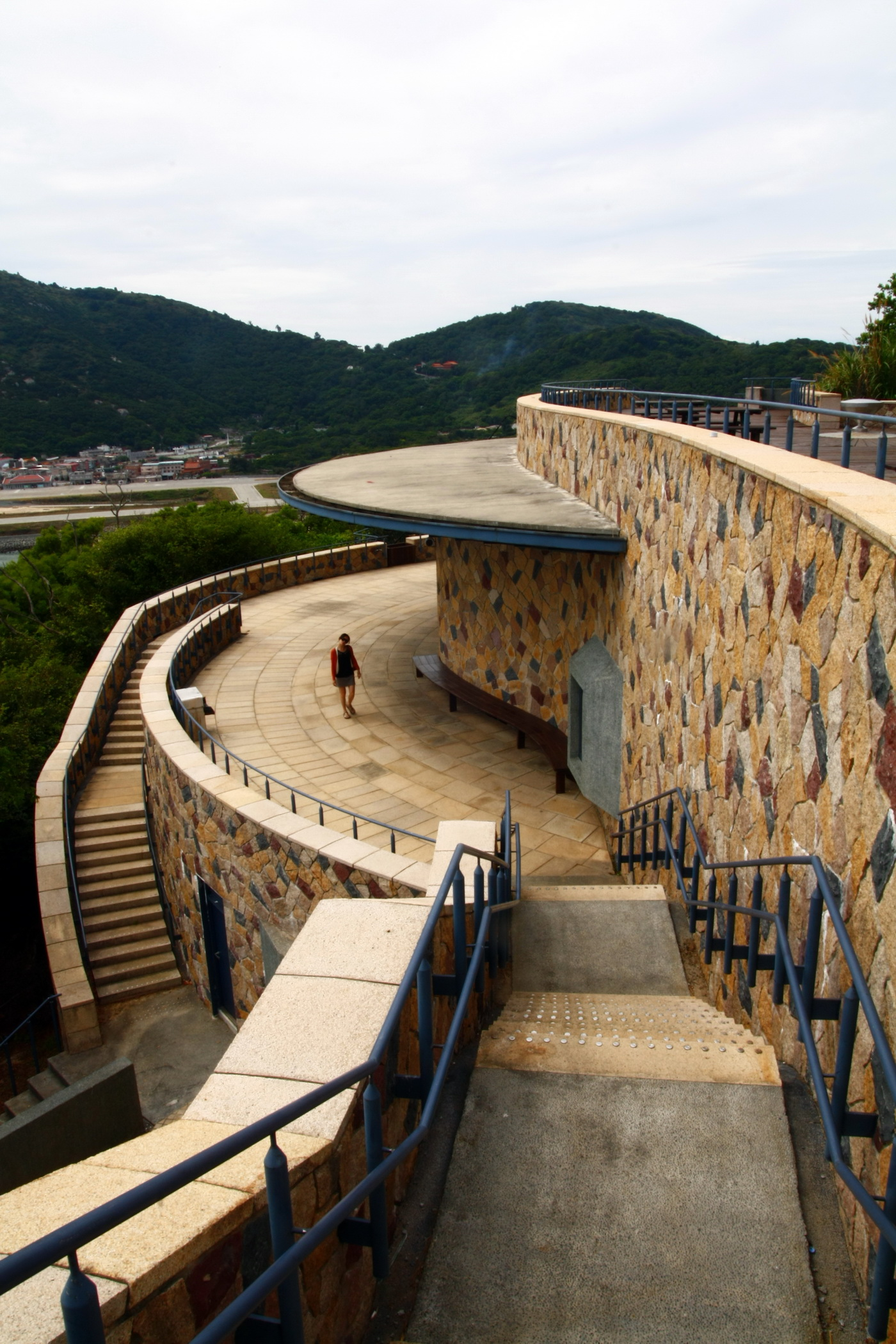
- Interactive map of War and Peace Memorial Park Exhibition Center
- Location: Beigan, Lienchiang, Taiwan
- Coordinates: 26°13′14.2″N 120°00′30.7″E

Construction
- Opened: 29 March 2010

The War and Peace Memorial Park Exhibition Center (traditional Chinese: 戰爭和平紀念公園主題館; simplified Chinese: 战争和平纪念公园主题馆; pinyin: Zhànzhēng Hépíng Jìniàn Gōngyuán Zhǔtí Guǎn) is a gallery in Beigan Township, Lienchiang County, Taiwan.

== History ==
The area around the gallery used to be the Stronghold #06, #08 and #12 during the Chinese Civil War. The planning to establish the center started in 2003 covering a total area of 38.8 which includes the gallery building and the surrounding park. The gallery was opened on 29 March 2010.

== Exhibition ==
The gallery displays history about Matsu under military rule, from the origins, chronology of military events, military items and military-citizens social culture display areas.

== See also ==
- List of tourist attractions in Taiwan
