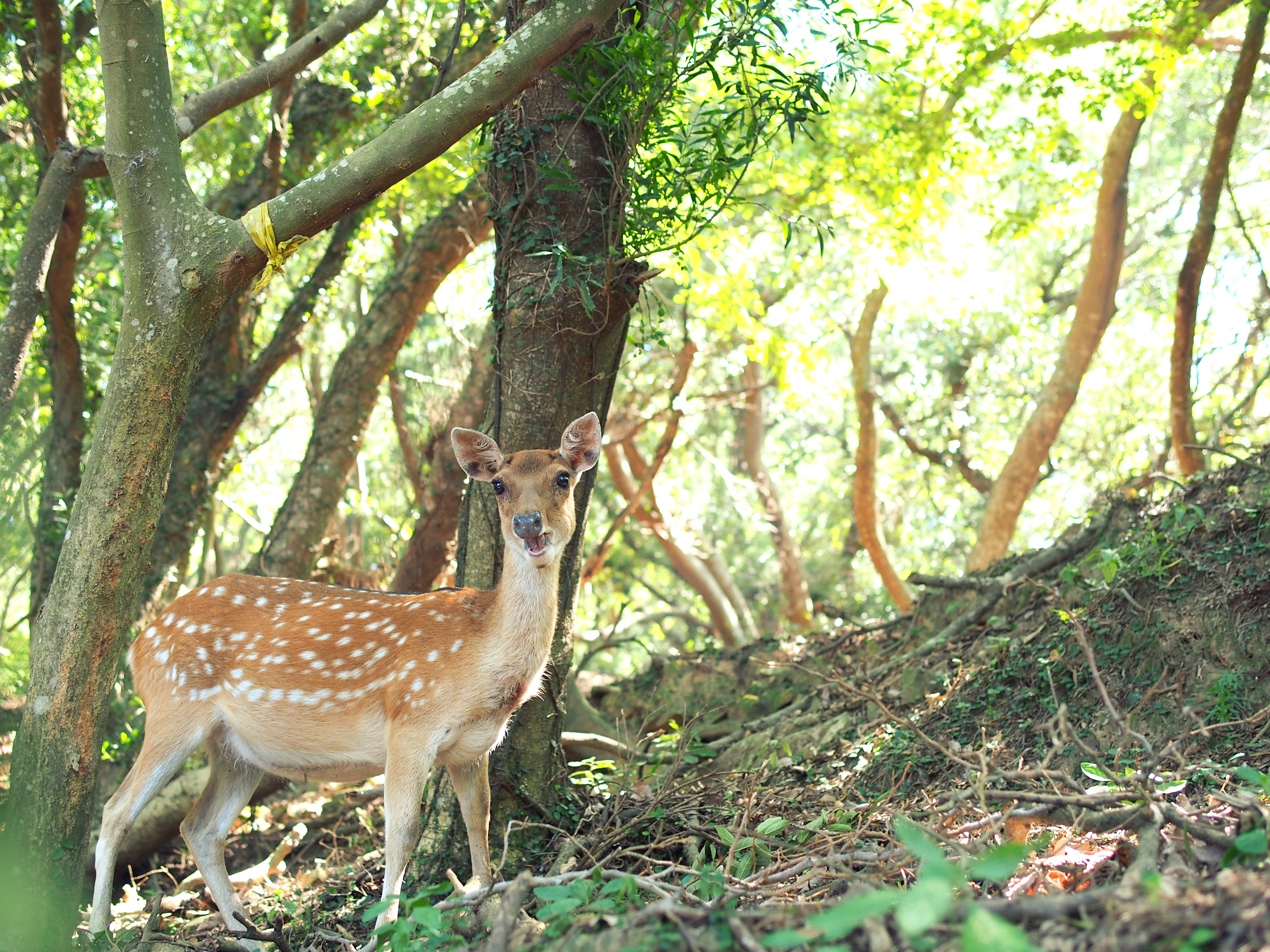
- Formosan sika deer on Daqiu Island

Scientific classification
- Kingdom: Animalia
- Phylum: Chordata
- Class: Mammalia
- Order: Artiodactyla
- Family: Cervidae
- Genus: Cervus
- Species: C. nippon
- Subspecies: C. n. taiouanus

Trinomial name
- Cervus nippon taiouanus Blyth, 1860

= Formosan sika deer =

Subspecies of deer

The Formosan sika deer (Cervus nippon taiouanus) is a subspecies of sika deer endemic to the island of Taiwan. Formosan sika, like most of the terrestrial fauna and flora of Taiwan, arrived on the island during Pleistocene glacial periods when lower sea levels connected Taiwan to the Asian mainland.

== Appearance and behavior ==
Sika stand 90–120 cm at the shoulder, 155 cm in length, 43–68 kg in weight. Males are larger and bear deciduous antlers. The summer coat is light brownish, with obvious white spots, while in winter their coat is darker and the spots fade.

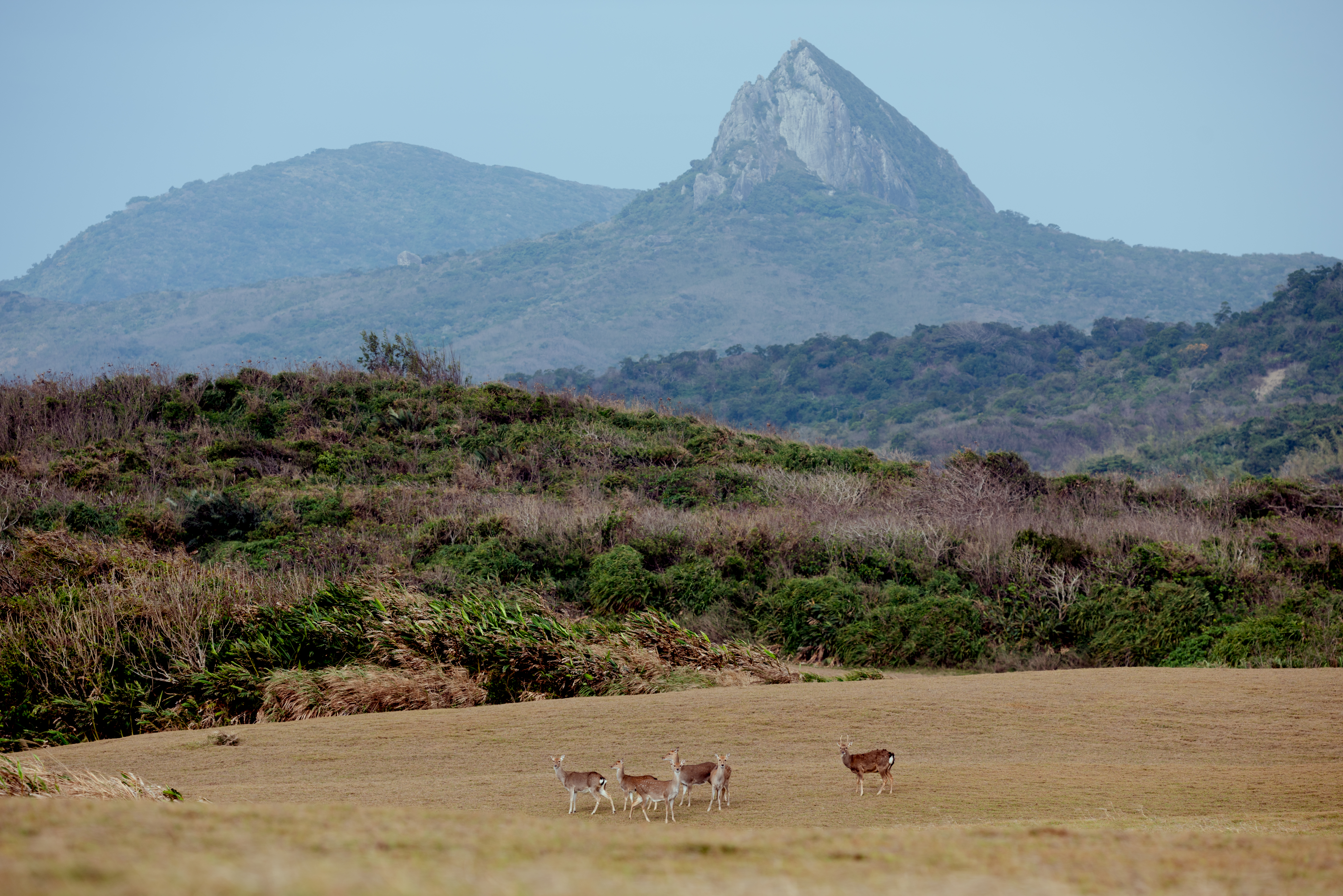
Formosan sika deer at Kenting National Park

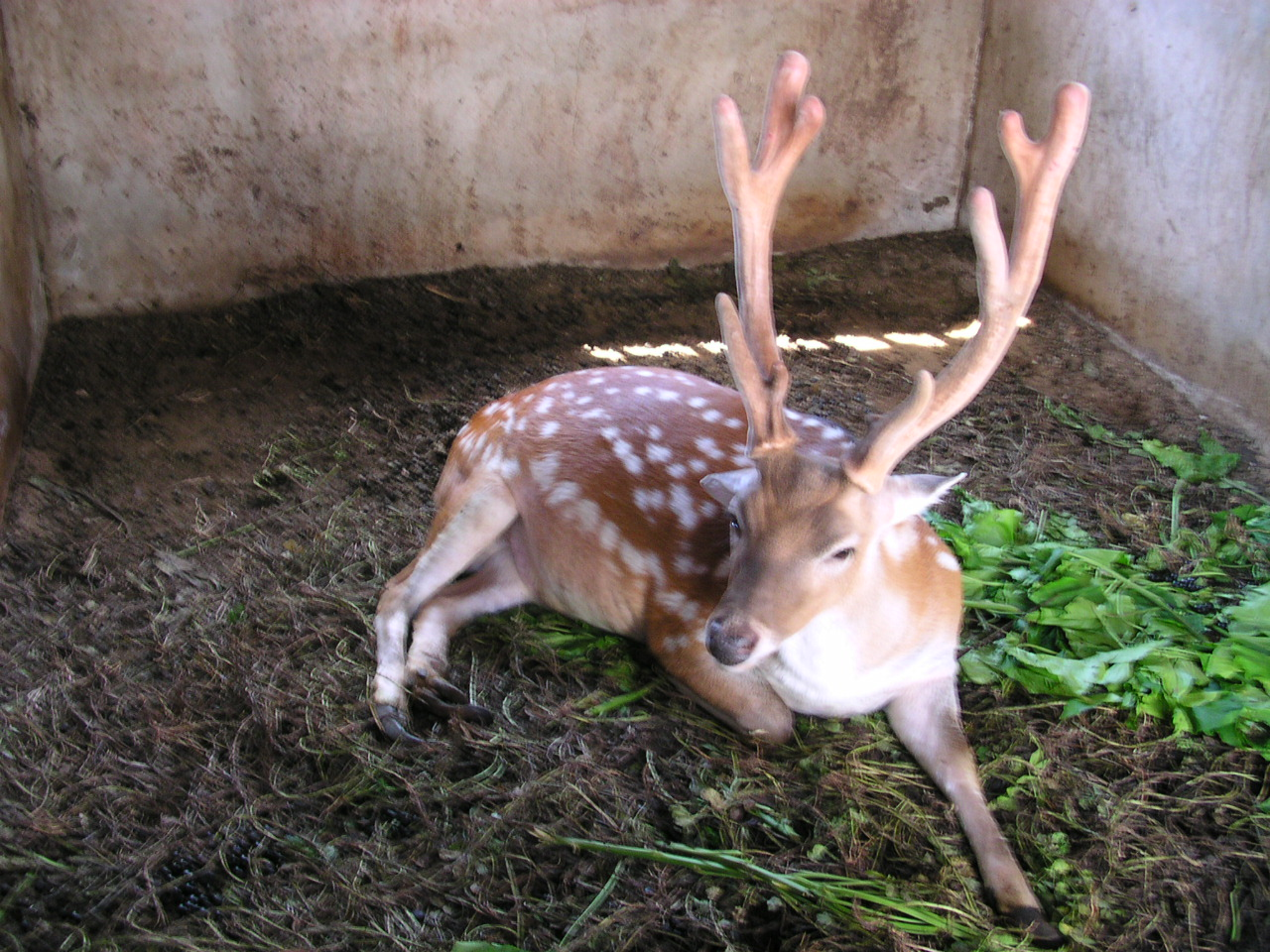
Captive-bred specimen

== Range and habitat ==
The natural distribution of sika on Taiwan was in the woodlands from sea level up to about 300 meters elevation. Sika, like many deer, prefer areas of mixed forest, scrub, and open land. Under natural conditions the low-lying alluvial plain that stretches from present-day Taipei along the west coast almost to the southern tip of the island were prime deer habitat and natural populations would have been quite dense.

== Status ==
Sika populations in Taiwan have been heavily influenced by human activity for the past four hundred years. Until the early 17th century the human population of Taiwan was low and comprised mostly Austronesian peoples who had been living on the island for thousands of years. During the 17th century immigration from mainland China increased dramatically in response to political instability in China and economic opportunities on Taiwan, which from 1624 until 1662 was controlled by the Dutch East India Company (VOC). The VOC, operating from the port of Tayouan (modern-day Anping, Tainan) in southwestern Taiwan, established a trading post whose main business was the export of sika skins to neighboring Asia. During the six decades of Dutch activity two to four million sika skins were exported to China and Japan. Exporting was reduced when the Dutch were forced out of Taiwan in 1662, but continued throughout the Qing period with a switch to Japan as the major export market.

The intensive hunting of sika during the Dutch era must have severely decreased the population of sika. Sika populations continued to decline over the next few centuries as the human population expanded—the natural habitat of sika in the lowland plains was steadily converted to farmland, and later urbanized, as the human population increased. Hunting also continued. As a result, wild sika populations decreased steadily, and in 1969 the last known wild sika was killed.

Formosan Sika at Beijing Wildlife Park

However, deer are easily kept in captivity and there were a number of captive populations of C. n. taiouanus. In 1984 Taiwan’s Council of Agriculture funded the Sika Deer Reintroduction Project, based at Kenting National Park on the southern tip of the island. Twenty-two deer were transferred from the Taipei Zoo to serve as a founder population. Over the next 10 years the deer were maintained in enclosures until their eventual release into the National Park in 1994. Altogether over 200 deer have been released and the current population, now spread beyond the park borders, is estimated to exceed 1000 individuals. Discussions regarding other possible reintroduction sites, including Yangmingshan National Park near Taipei, are ongoing. Daqiu Island, Beigan Township, Lienchiang County (the Matsu Islands) is known for its population of Formosan sika deer introduced in the 1990s.

== See also ==
- List of endemic species of Taiwan
- Hunting in Taiwan
