= Beigan =

Beigan Township 北竿鄉 Peikan
- Rural Township
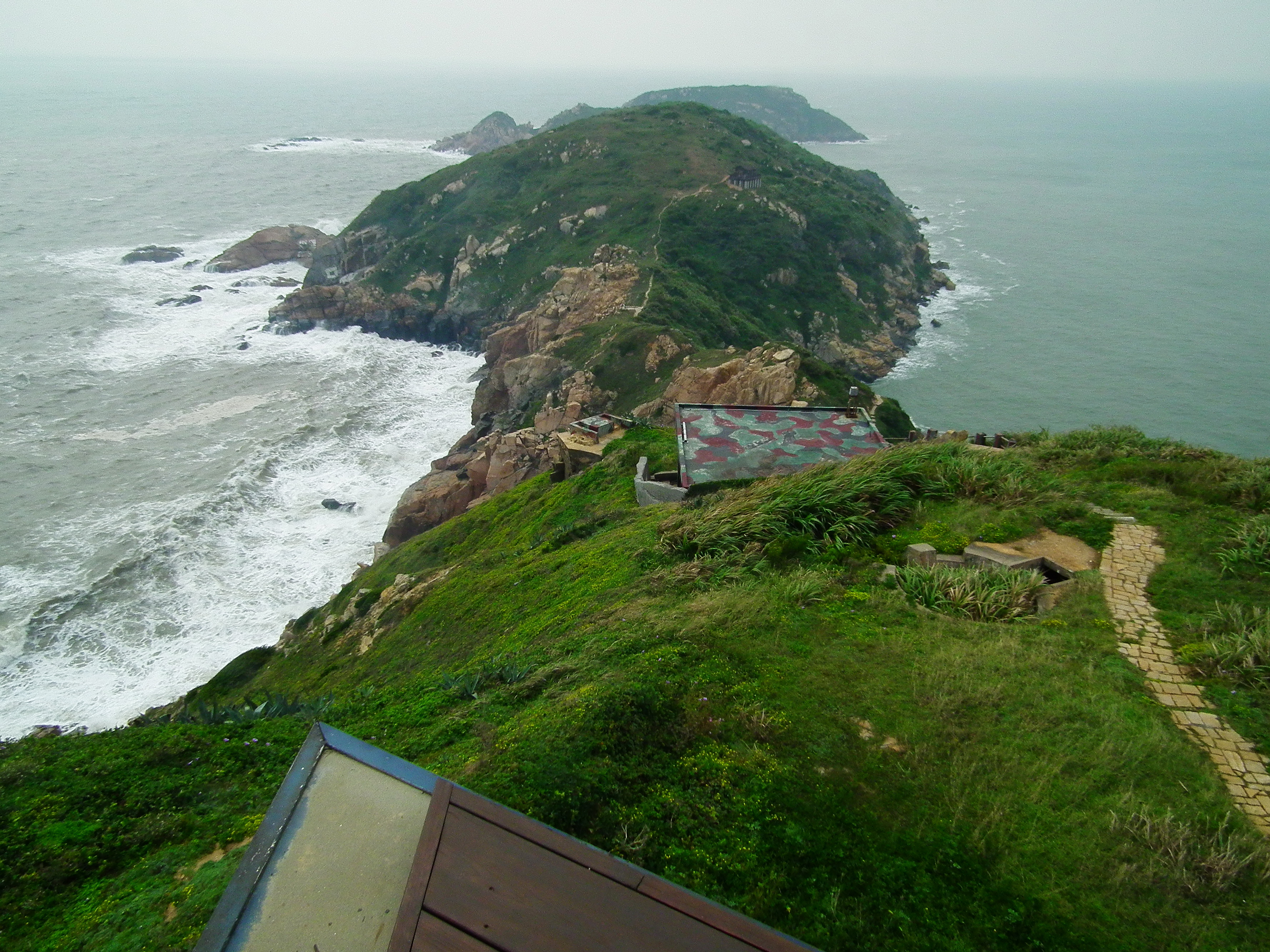
- Beigan Luoshan Trail

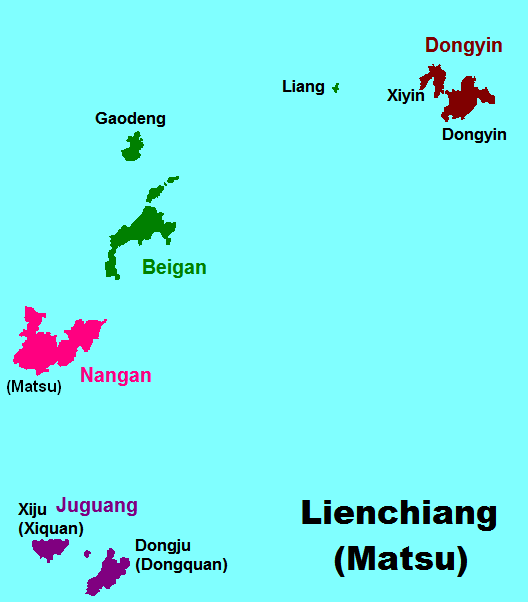
- Beigan Township in Lienchiang County
- Coordinates: 26°13′25″N 119°59′21″E
- Country: Republic of China (Taiwan)
- Province: Fujian (streamlined)
- County: (Lienchiang County) Lienchiang
- Rural villages: 6

Government
  - Mayor: Chen Ju-lan (陳如嵐) (KMT)

Area
  - Total: 9.3 km^{2} (3.6 sq mi)

Population (March 2023)
  - Total: 3,155
  - Density: 340/km^{2} (880/sq mi)
- Time zone: UTC+8 (National Standard Time)
- Postal code: 210
- Area code: (0)836
- Website: client.matsu.idv.tw/tour/beigan-gov/en.htm

Location of Beigan, Lienchiang

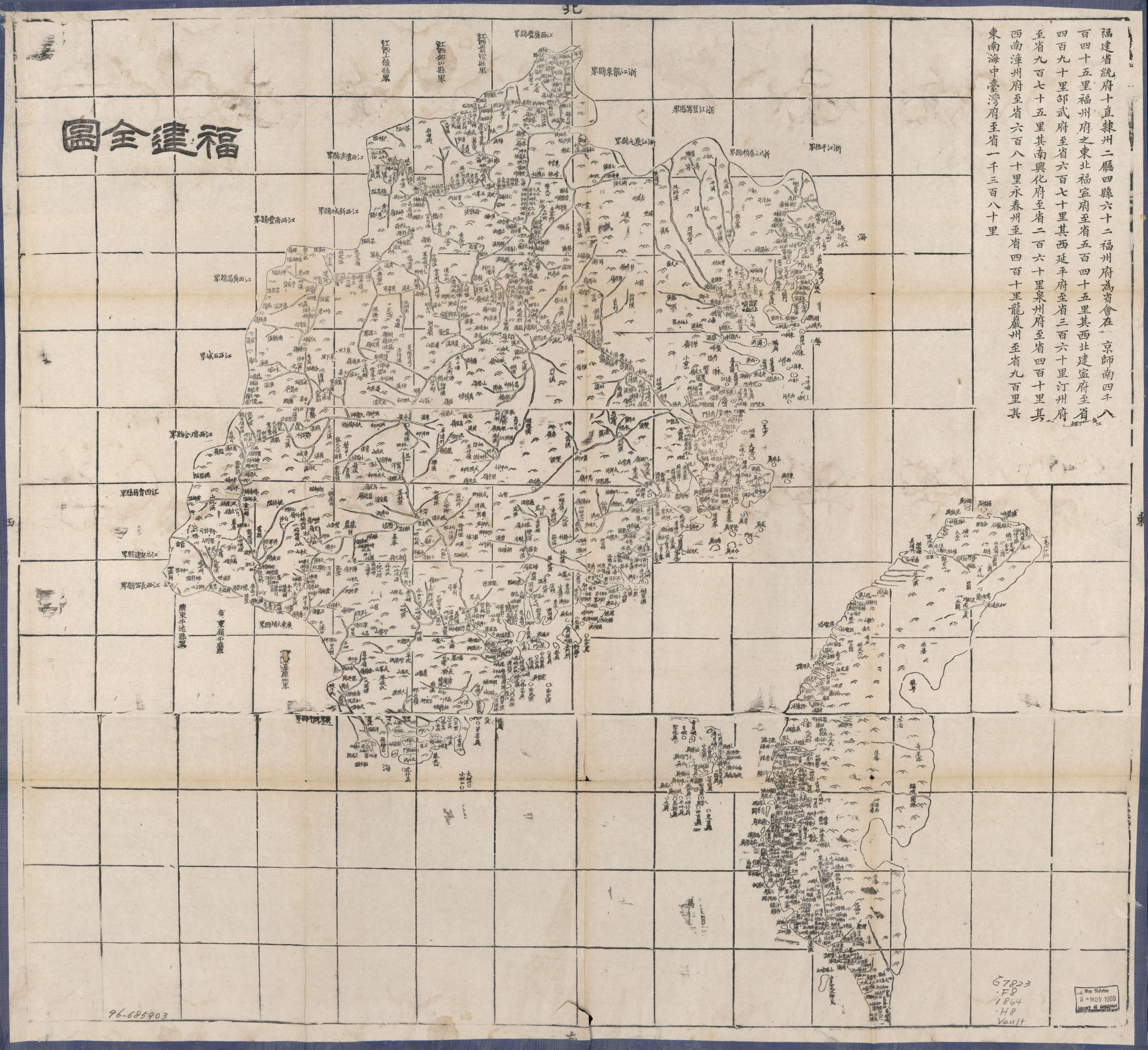
Beigan Island (labelled 下竿塘)

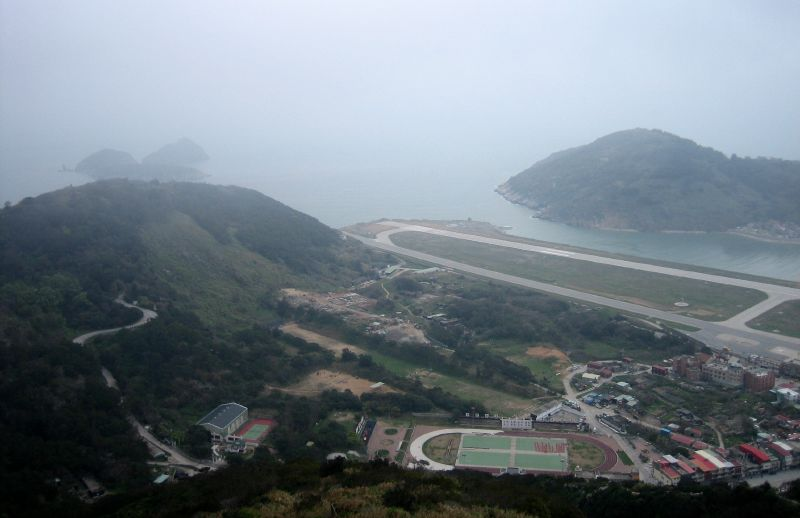
Tangqi and Houwo villages from Bishan (Mount Bi)

Beigan Township (Chinese: 北竿鄉; pinyin: Běigān Xiāng; Foochow Romanized: Báe̤k-găng-hiŏng), is an insular rural township in Lienchiang County (the Matsu Islands), Taiwan (ROC). The township is in the East China Sea off the coast of Fujian Province, China near Fuzhou (Foochow). Beigan Island, the main island of the township, is the second largest island in the Matsu Islands after Nangan Island. Other smaller islands in the township include Daqiu Island, known for its Formosan sika deer, and Gaodeng Island and Liang Island which are off-limits to the public. The native language many of the inhabitants is Matsu dialect which is one of the statutory languages for public transport announcements in the Matsu Islands.

== Name ==
Beigan/Peikan Township is named for Beigan Island (Peikan Island or Pei-kan), the main island in the township. Beigan Island has also been known as Pei-kan-t'ang, Pei-kan Tang / Peikantang (Chinese: 北竿塘; pinyin: Běigāntáng; Wade–Giles: Pei³-kan¹-t'ang²), Changche shan (長岐山) / Changqidao (長岐島) and Ch'ang-hsü Shan (長㠘山). In Song and Ming records, Beigan Island was called Xiagantang/Xiagantangshan (下竿塘/下干塘/下竿塘山) as opposed to Nangan Island (Matsu Island), which was called Shanggantang/Shanggantangshan (上竿塘/上干塘/上竿塘山).

== History ==
Prehistoric settlement of Beigan dates back over six-thousand years before present.

Fishing villages were established on Beigan Island during the Song and Yuan dynasties.

During the Ming and Qing dynasties, the island was abandoned several times due to the Great Clearance edicts. Pirates were often seen in the area.

In 1754, a watchtower was in place on Beigan Island.

In 1869, the Qing government erected tablets in Tangqi and Qiaozi villages concerning salt taxes.

=== Republic of China ===
On August 18, 1928, during the middle of the night, the previous several days of torrential rain caused a landslide in Qiaozi resulting in the deaths of more than thirty people. One resident was rescued three days after the landslide. A family of eight was wiped out.

In 1934, a lianbao (associated bao) was created encompassing the inhabitants of the islands of Nangan, Beigan, Daqiu, Xiaoqiu, Gaodeng, Xiyang (西洋) and Dongyong (Dongyin). Later, Xiyang and Dongyong (Dongyin) were divided into a separate lianbao.

On September 10, 1937, Japan occupied Beigan and Nangan.

Beigan's vast resources of fish attracted many coastal Fujian residents to settle in the area to fish. In 1949, with the establishment of the People's Republic of China in Mainland China, Matsu was separated from the mainland and was subsequently incorporated under Lienchiang County by the Government of the Republic of China.

In the early 1950s, skirmishes between Nationalist and Communist forces occurred near Gaodeng Island.

On December 12, 1950, Beigan District was established as part of the Matsu Administrative Commission (馬祖行政公署). The county government and baojia system was ended. On August 15, 1953, Lienchiang County government was reestablished including Beigan Township.

On May 31, 1955, a Chinese Communist motor torpedo boat was engaged to the northeast of Beigan Island.

On May 17, 1959, Communist guns on the mainland coast fired 112 shells that landed on Beigan (Peikantang) Island according to the Nationalist Defense Ministry.

On October 25, 1967, Chinese Communist shelling at Tangqi Village lead to the death of one nineteen year-old, injury of six others and the destruction of three buildings.

On May 3, 1977, and May 2 and September 28, 1980, President Chiang Ching-kuo visited the township.

In 1994, the Beigan Airport was built on Beigan Island.

On June 17, 1994, and again on August 31, 1996, President Lee Teng-hui visited the township.

On August 10, 1997, Formosa Airlines Flight 7601 crashed on Beigan Island. All of the crew and passengers died.

On November 17, 2000, President Chen Shui-bian visited the township.

In 2011, prehistoric human skeletons were found on Liang Island.

On January 19, 2013, President Ma Ying-jeou visited the township.

In 2013, the movie 100 Days was filmed in Qinbi (Cinbi) Village.

In 2016, plans for constructing a heart-shaped stone structure at Beigan Island like the Double-Heart of Stacked Stones at Cimei were halted after residents raised environmental concerns.

== Geography ==
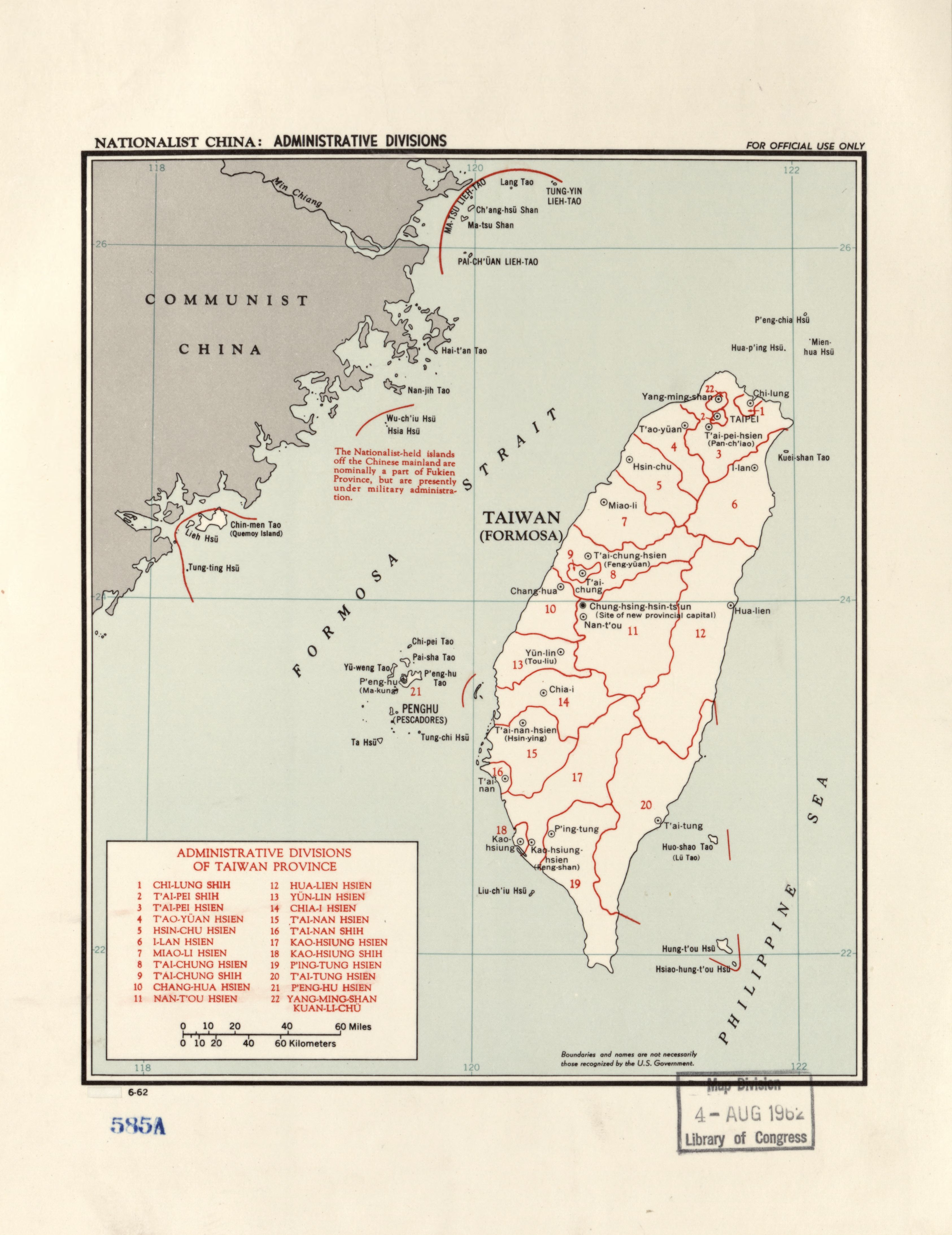
The Matsu Islands (MA-TSU LIEH-TAO) including Beigan Island (Ch'ang-hsü Shan) "The Nationalist-held islands off the Chinese mainland are nominally a part of Fukien Province, but are presently under military administration." (1962)

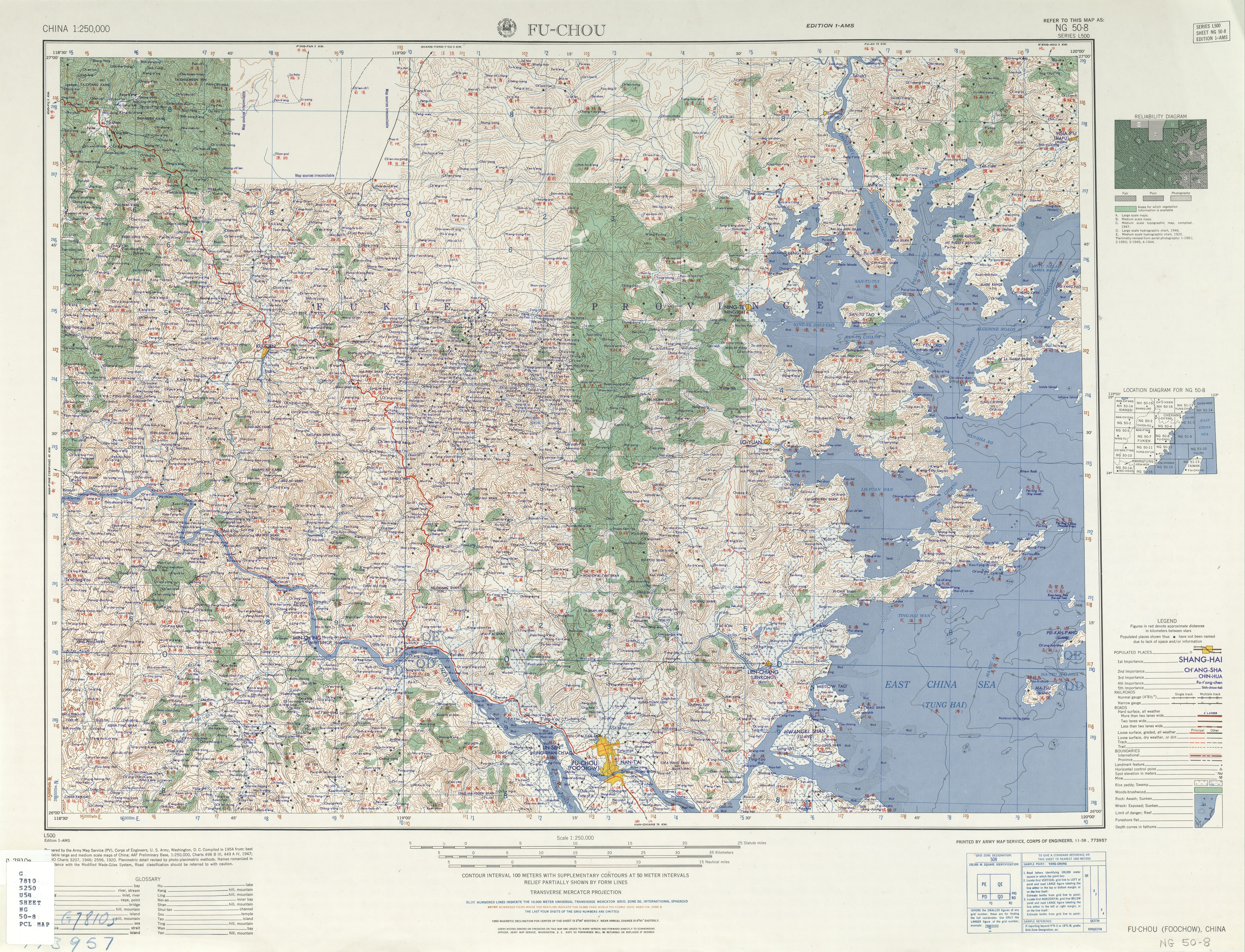
Beigan Island in the East China Sea (labelled as PEI-KAN-T'ANG (ISLAND) 北竿塘) (1954)

Beigan Township is located approximately 110 nautical miles (200 km) northwest of Taiwan Island. The township is located to the north of Nangan (Matsu Island) and is the second largest island in the Matsu Islands. At their closet points, Beigan Island and Nangan Island are within 3 kilometres (1.6 nmi) of each other. The population center of Beigan is Tangqi (Tan-chi) village and is the place where major shops and restaurant are located.

Beigan is a long and narrow island with tall mountains. Its highest peak is Bishan (Mount Bi) (Chinese: 壁山; pinyin: Bìshān), standing at 298 metres (978 ft) above sea level, which is the highest point in the Matsu Islands. The terrain of the rest of the island rises and falls with large numbers of sandy beaches and outlying islands.

The main island of Beigan Township is Beigan Island, which is 6.43 square kilometres (2.48 mi^{2}) in area. Minor islands include Gaodeng Island (second largest), Daqiu Island (third largest), Liang Island (fourth largest) and Xiaoqiu Island (小坵) (fifth largest). The northernmost and easternmost points of Beigan Township are on Liang Island, the westernmost point is on Jinyu (進嶼), and the southernmost point is on Queshi (鵲石). Other islands include Wumingdao (無名島), Qiaotou (峭頭), Jinyu (進嶼), Langyan (浪岩) / Liang Reef (Liangjiao Reef; 亮礁), Sanlianyu (Trio Rocks; 三連嶼), Zhongdao (中島), Geli Dao (Clam Island; 蛤蜊島) which is now connected to southern Beigan Island by a causeway and Luoshan (螺山) and Bangshan (蚌山) which are near the northeastern coast of Beigan Island. There is a small island just a few meters off the beach of Qinbi (Chinbi) which is about 5m high called Turtle Island.

== Politics and government ==
=== Administrative divisions ===
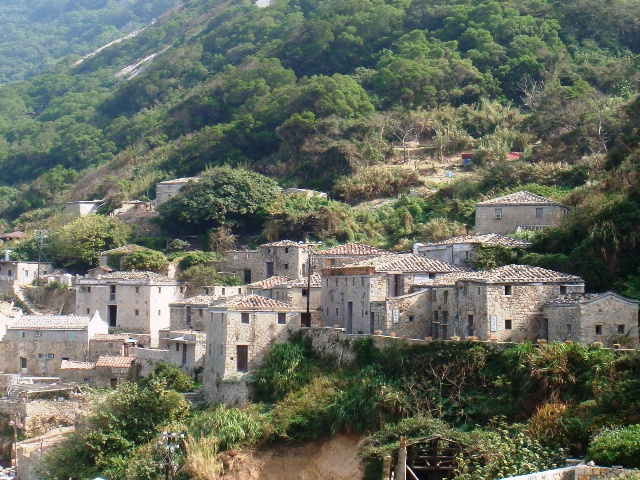
Qinbi (Chinbi) Village

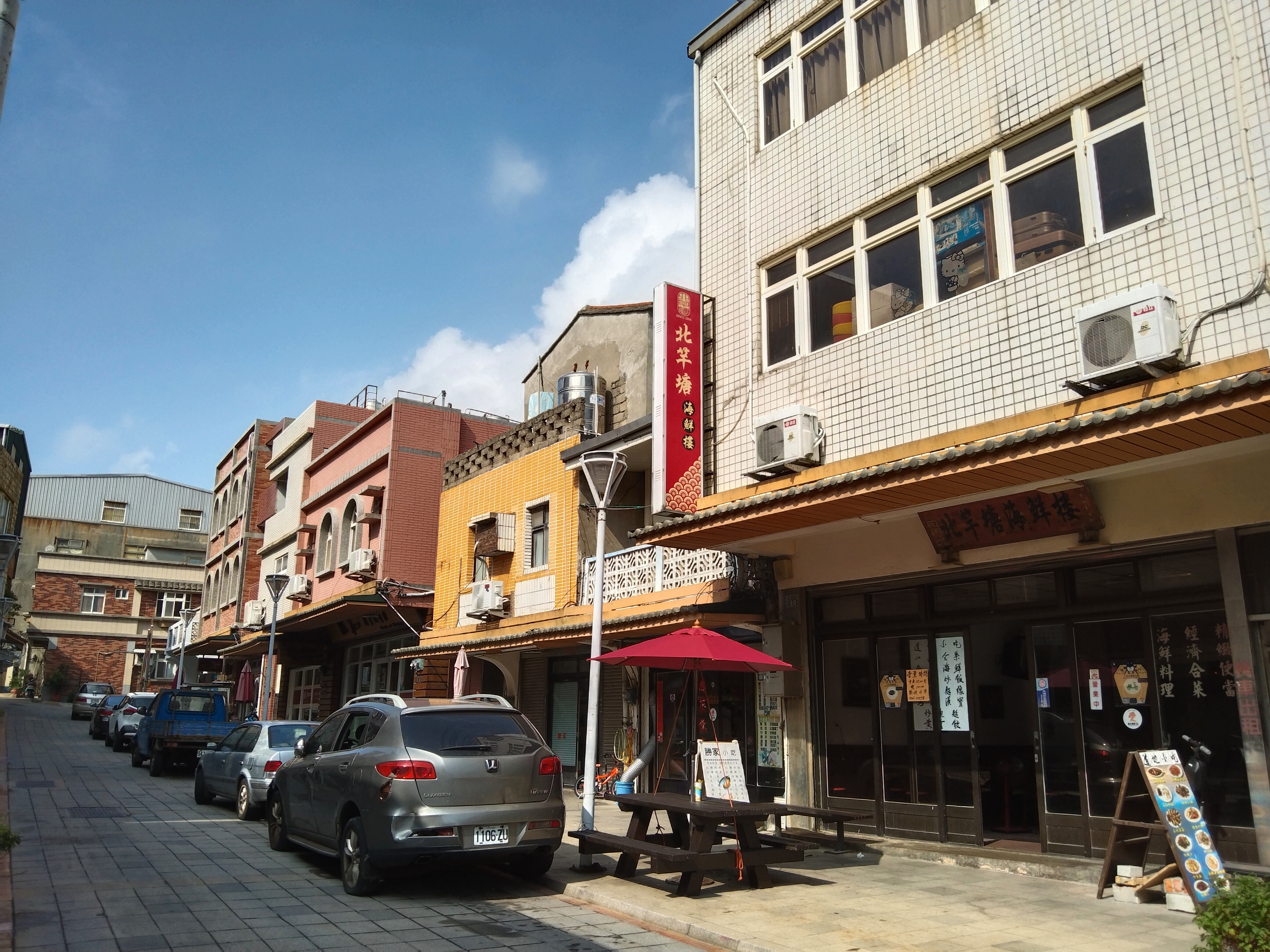
Tangqi Village,the most densely populated village on the island

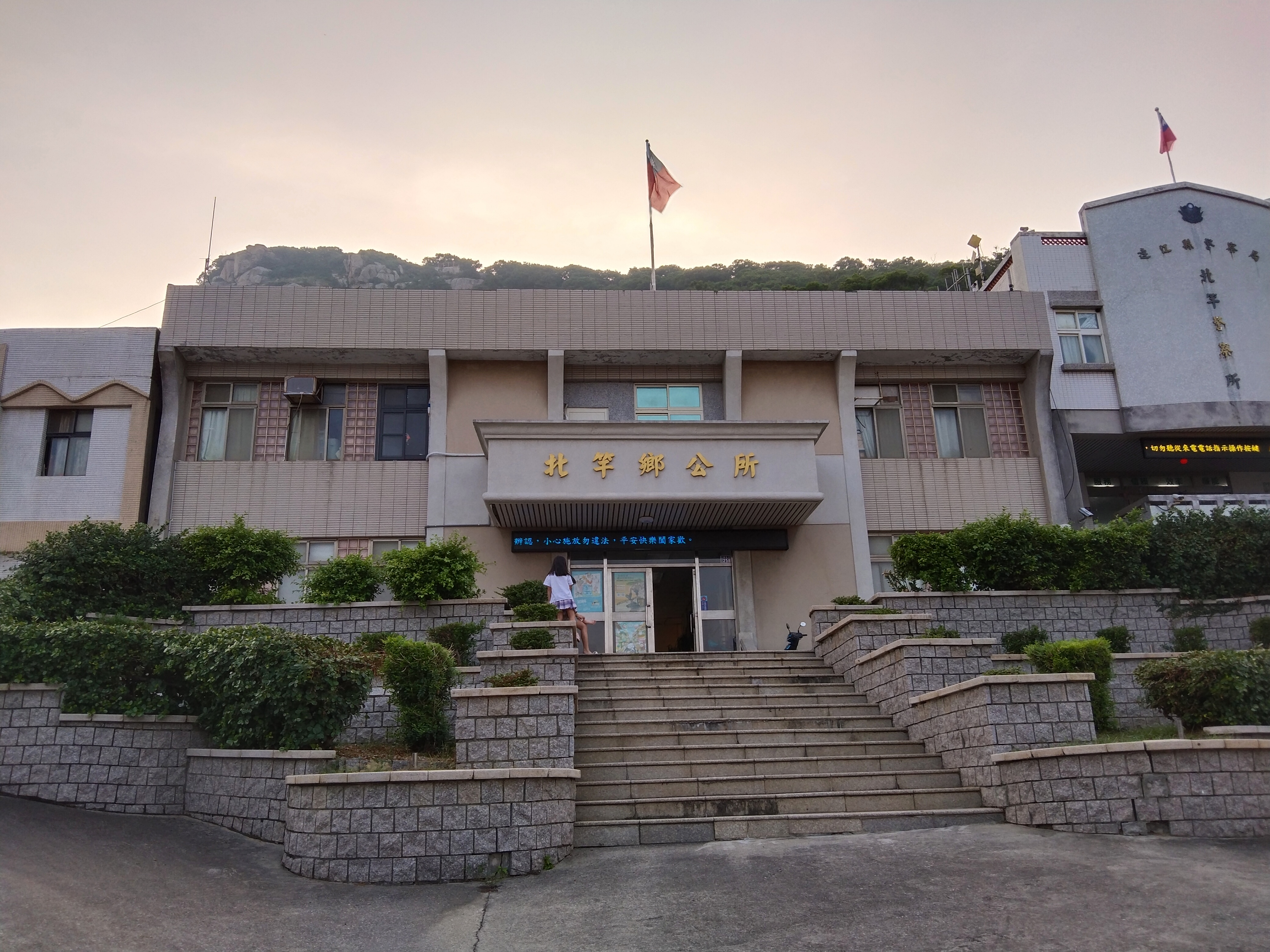
Beigan Township Office

Since the restoration of the county government on August 15, 1953, Beigan Township has been divided into 6 villages:

- Houwo/Hou'ao (Houwo; 后沃村, colloquial form of the earlier name 後澳/后澳), situated on a peninsula that has to be reached through a tunnel under the airport.
- Qinbi (Chinpi /Chinbi / Cinbi) (芹壁村; Foochow Romanized: Kṳ̀ng-biék-chŏng), famous for its fantastic view of Turtle Island, Daqiu Island and Gaodeng Island. Qinbi is known as 'A Mediterranean town on the Taiwan Strait' (「馬祖地中海」).
- Tangqi/Tangci (Tangchi; 塘岐村), the most densely populated village on the island.
- Baisha (Paisha; 白沙村), near the port that the commercial boats park at.
- Banli (Panli; 坂里村, historically 堘村), where the Beihai Tunnel of Beigan is situated.
- Ciaozai / Qiaozi (Chiaozai, Chiaotzu; 橋仔村), located on the northeastern side of Beigan.

=== Mayors ===
Since 1951, Beigan Township has had seventeen mayors:

- Appointed mayors
1. Wang Shih-Fang (王詩芳) Jan 1951 – Dec 1953
2. Lin Sheng-Yen (林聖炎) Dec 1953 – Sep 1954
3. Lin Shou-Chi (林守基) Sep 1954 – Sep 1955
4. Cheng Tseng-Yuan (鄭曾源) Sep 1955 – Sep 1956
5. Yang I-Cheng (楊一誠) Sep 1956 – 5 Nov 1957
6. Yang Tso-Yung (楊作永) 5 Nov 1957 – 1 Aug 1960
7. Chen Shou-Wei (陳壽維) 1 Aug 1960 – 21 Feb 1962
8. Yu Te-Chu (尤德渠) 21 Feb 1962 – 10 Mar 1962, also mayor of Nangan
9. Pan Fu (潘輔) 10 Mar 1962 – 2 Jul 1962, former and later mayor of Nangan
10. Chen I-Peng (陳一鵬) 2 Jul 1962 – 19 May 1970, later mayor of Juguang and then Nangan
11. Li Kuei-Li (李貴立) 19 May 1970 – 1 Jan 1978, former mayor of Juguang
- Elected mayors
1. Wang Li-Teng (王禮登) 1 Jan 1978 -1 Mar 1982
2. Huang Chi-Chung (黃啟忠) 1 Mar 1982 – 1 Mar 1990
3. Wang Shih-Chien (王詩乾) 1 Mar 1990 – 1 Mar 1998
4. Wang Chao-Sheng (王朝生) 1 Mar 1998 – 1 Mar 2006
5. Chou Jui-Ko (周瑞國) 1 Mar 2006 – 24 Dec 2014 (KMT)
6. Chen Ju-Lan (陳如嵐) 24 Dec 2014 – present (KMT), in 2014 ran against Wu Chin-Ping (吳金平), ran unopposed in 2018

== Economy ==
There are branches of 7-Eleven at the villages of Tangqi and Banli and several other shops on the island. With the withdrawal of most of the military forces, the main source of income is now tourism, with several hotels in Tangqi, and numerous B&Bs in Qinbi and Qiaozi. There are no banks on the island of Beigan, but the Chunghwa Post office has an ATM.

== Education ==
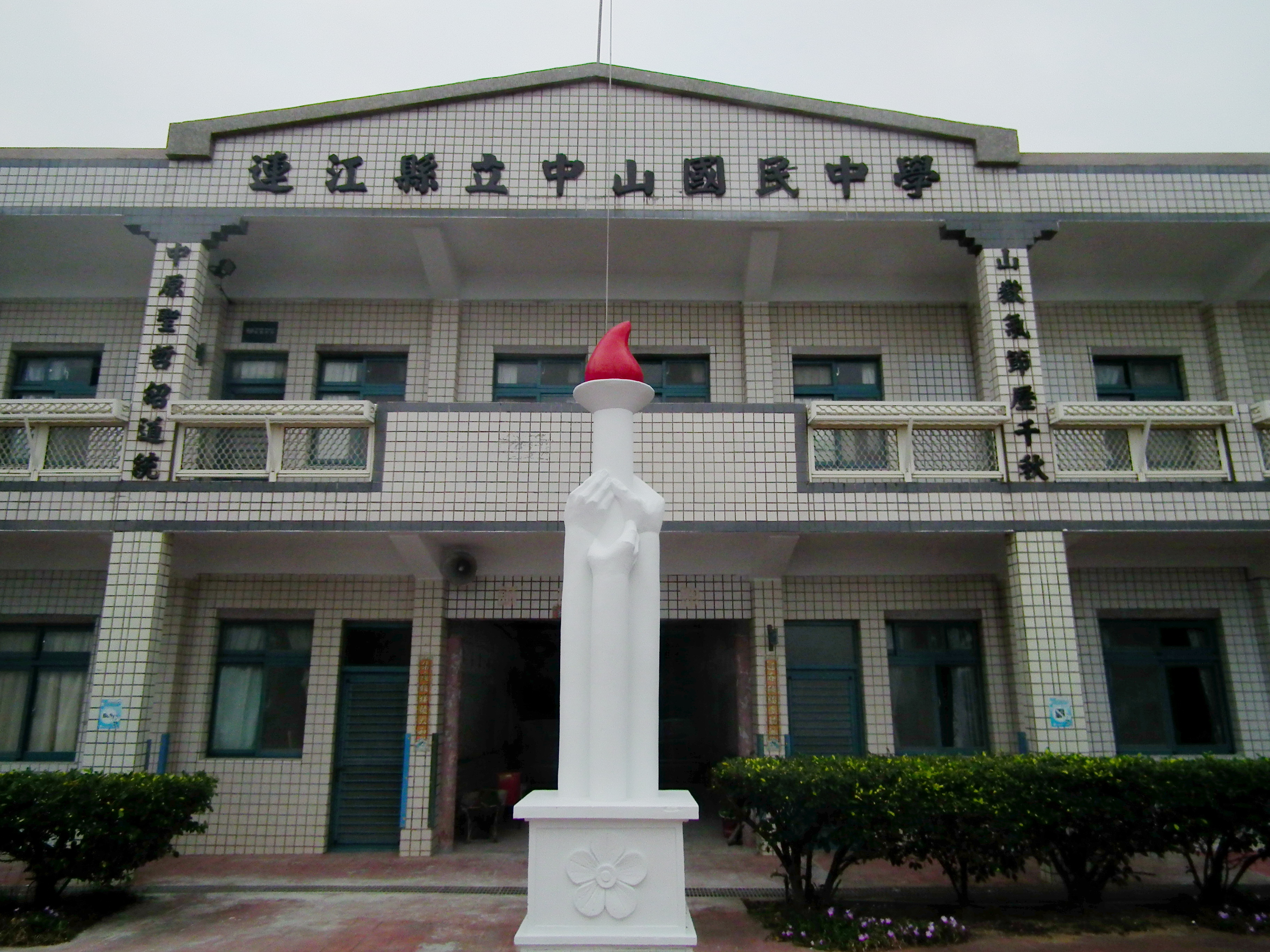
Chung Shan Junior High School

There is one junior high school and one elementary school on Beigan Island.

- Lienchiang County Chung Shan Junior High School (連江縣立中山國民中學)
- Lienchiang County Beigan Township Tang Chi Elementary School (連江縣北竿鄉塘岐國民小學)

In August 2018 (Republic of China calendar year 107), Banli Elementary School (坂里國小校) consolidated into Tang Chi Elementary, since the Banli campus became the National Taiwan Ocean University Matsu Campus (國立臺灣海洋大學馬祖校區).

National Matsu Senior High School (國立馬祖高級中學), operated by the national government, is located in Nangan.

The library of Beigan opens daily from Wednesday to Sundays with the exception of national holidays.

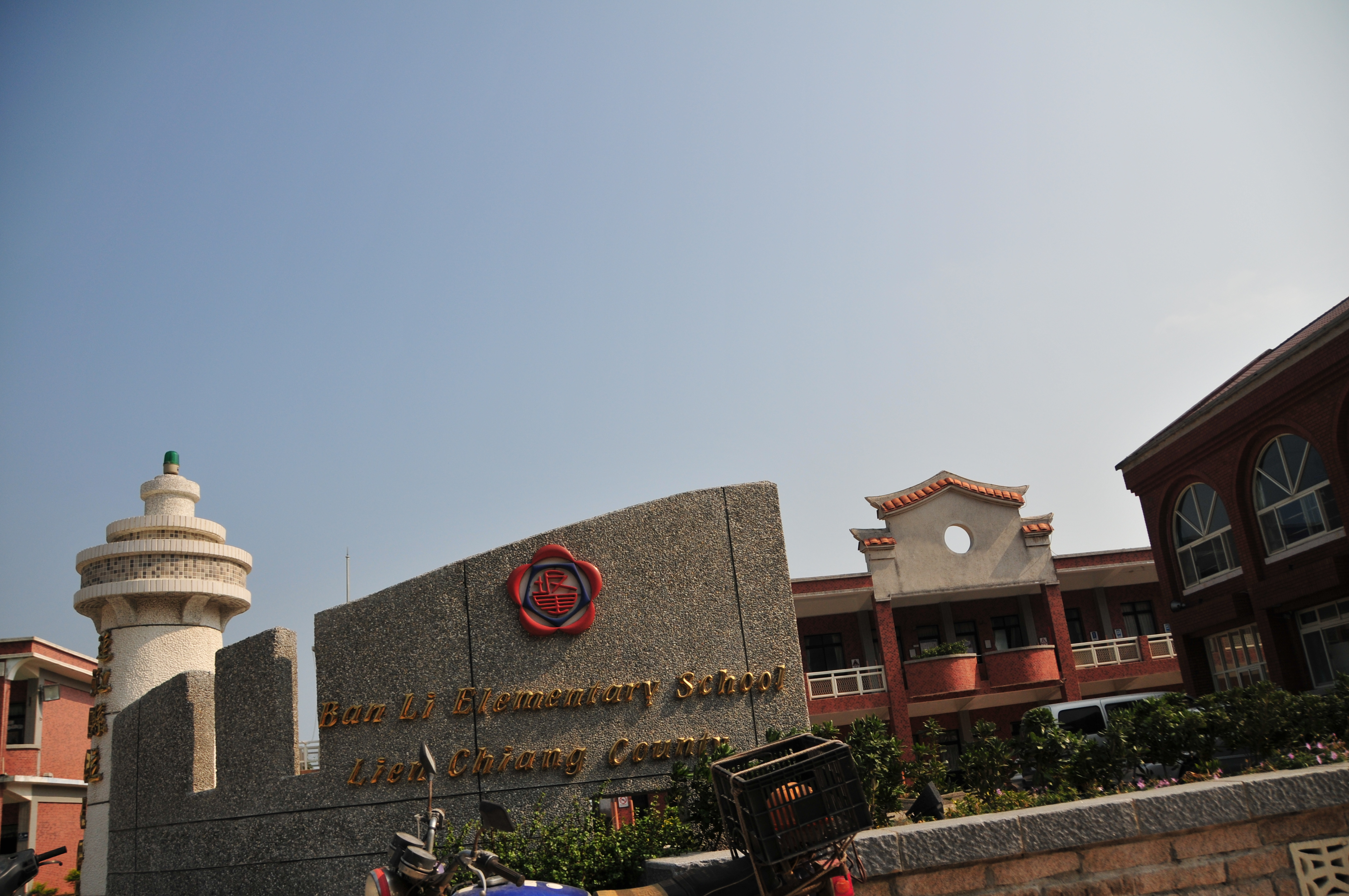
Ban Li Elementary School, which closed in 2018 and now houses National Taiwan Ocean University Matsu Campus

== Medical Institutions ==
- Beigang Health Bureau (衛生所)
- North High Hospital (北高醫院)

== Tourist attractions ==
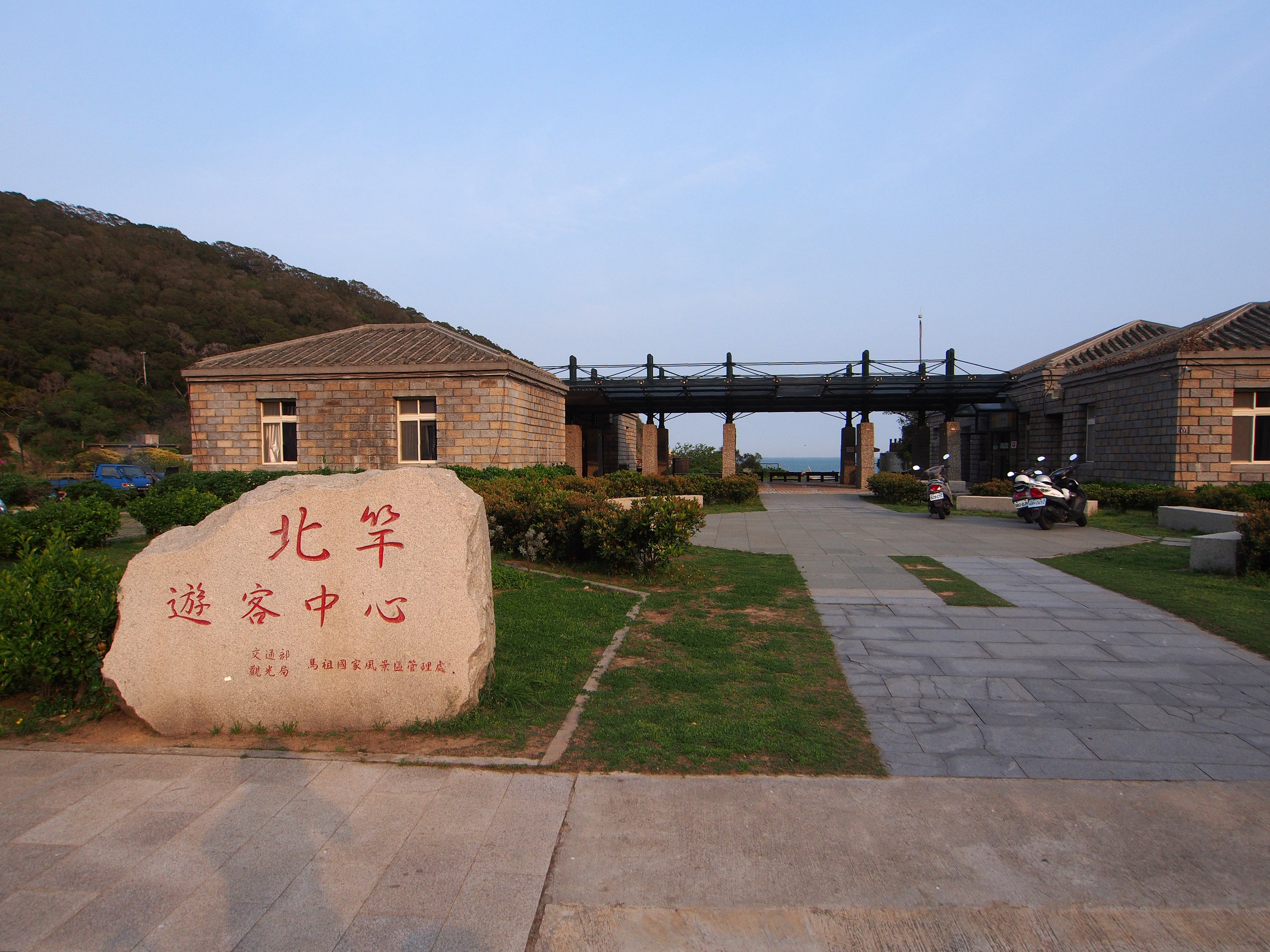
Beigan Visitor Center

- Beihai Tunnel
- Benli Beach
- Tanghou Beach
- Turtle Island
- War and Peace Memorial Park Exhibition Center

== Transportation ==
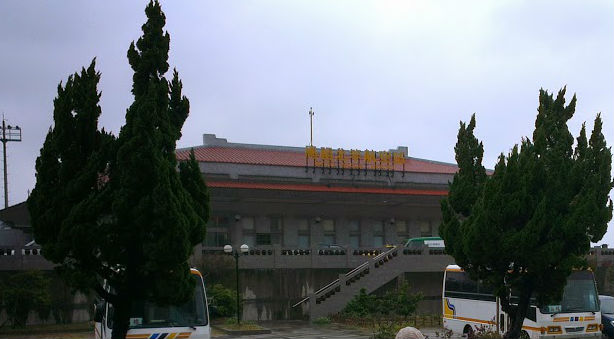
Matsu Beigan Airport

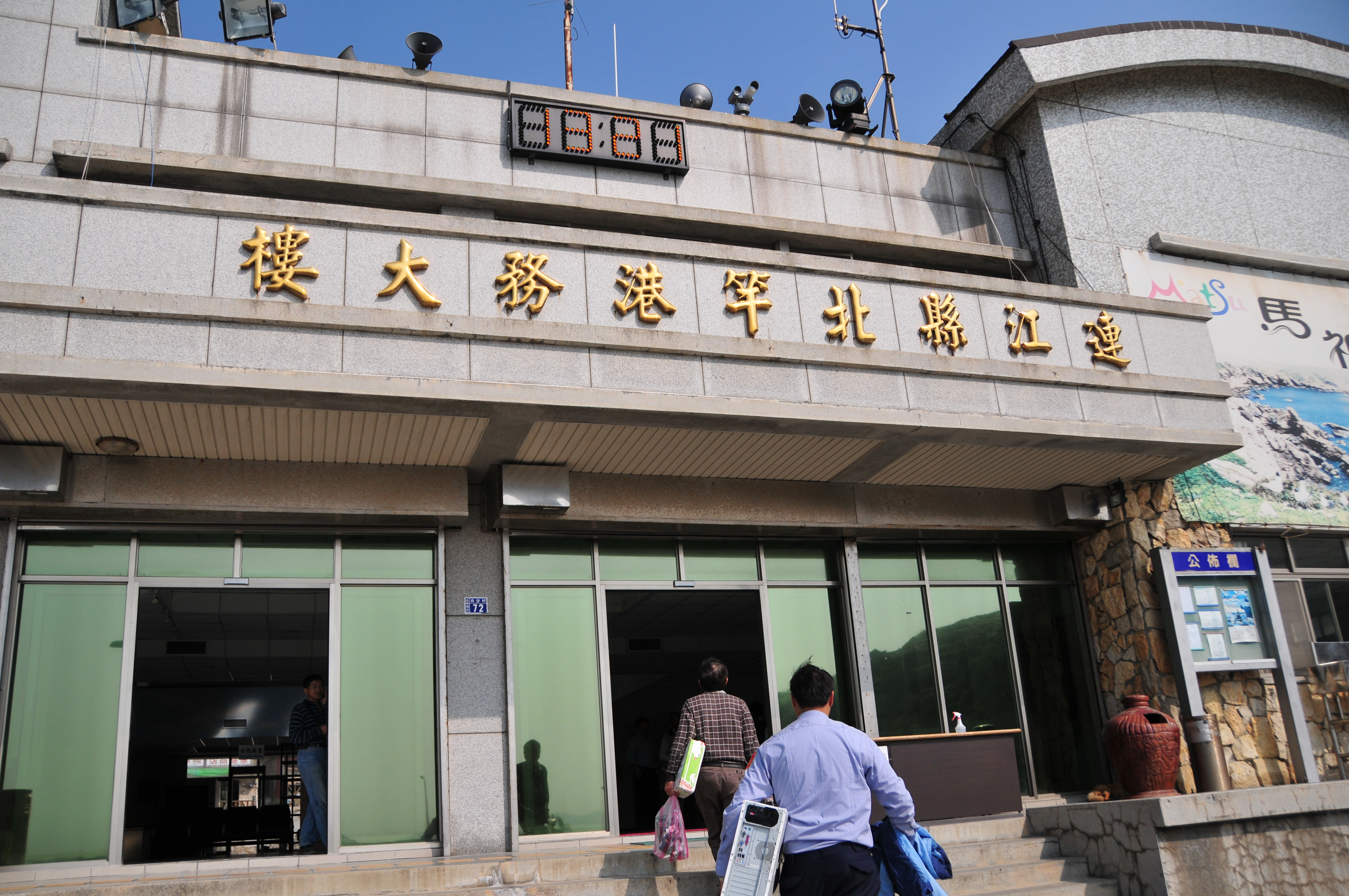
Beigan Harbor

=== Air ===
The Beigan Airport links the Matsu Islands and Taiwan Island at Taipei Songshan Airport and Taichung Airport.

=== Sea ===
The township houses the Beigan Harbor. There are commercial boat rides from Nangan regularly every 10 to 15 minutes. Boats from the Port of Keelung on Taiwan Island regularly visit Nangan, and from Nangan one can take the ferry to Beigan.

Starting 23 December 2015, there will be direct ferry service between Beigan and Huangqi in Lianjiang County, Fuzhou, Fujian, Mainland China.

=== Road ===
Roads in Beigan are served by taxi or rented cars and buses. Scooters can also be rented from several places.

== Gallery ==
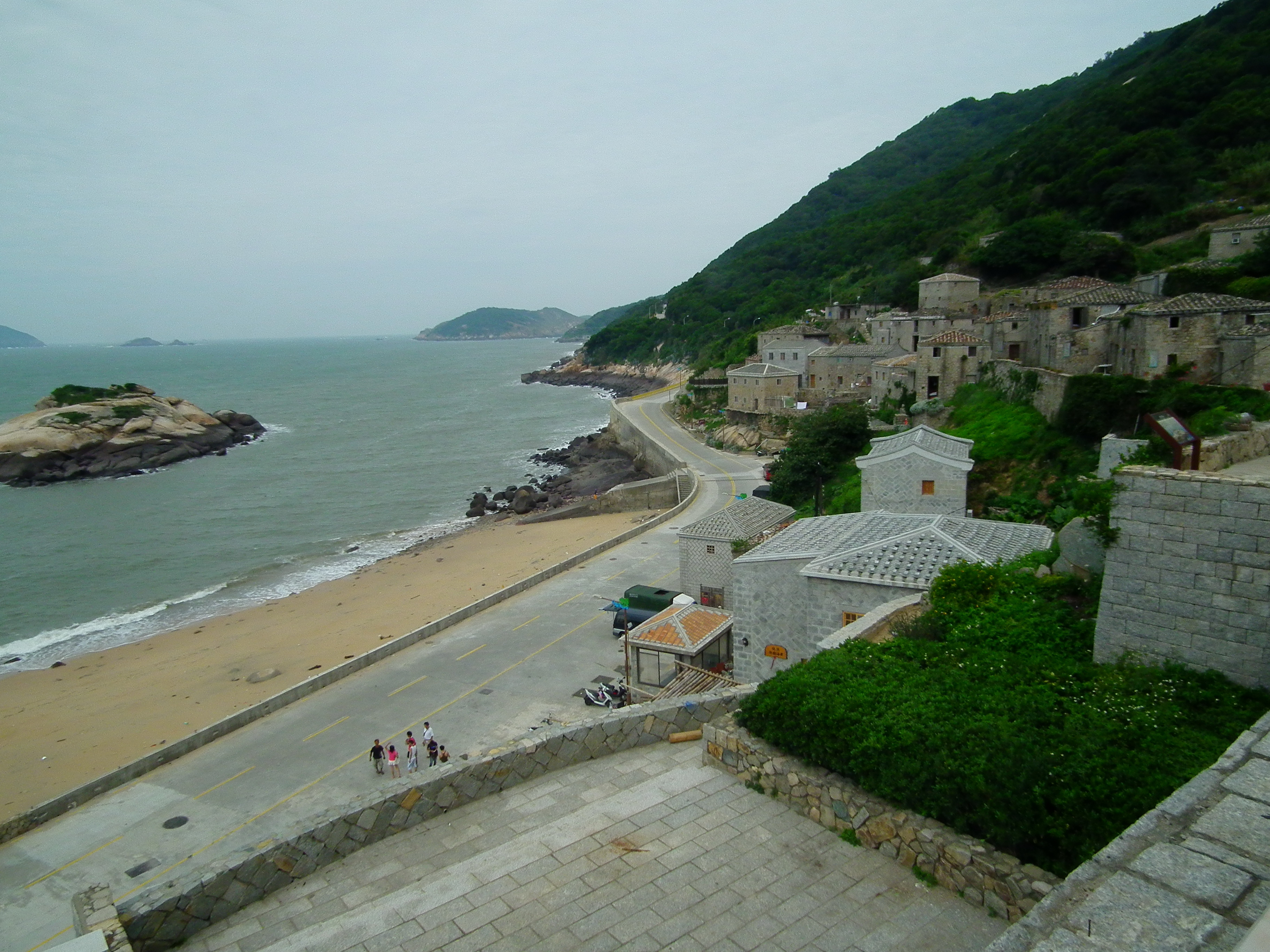
Qinbi (Chinbi) Village and Turtle Island

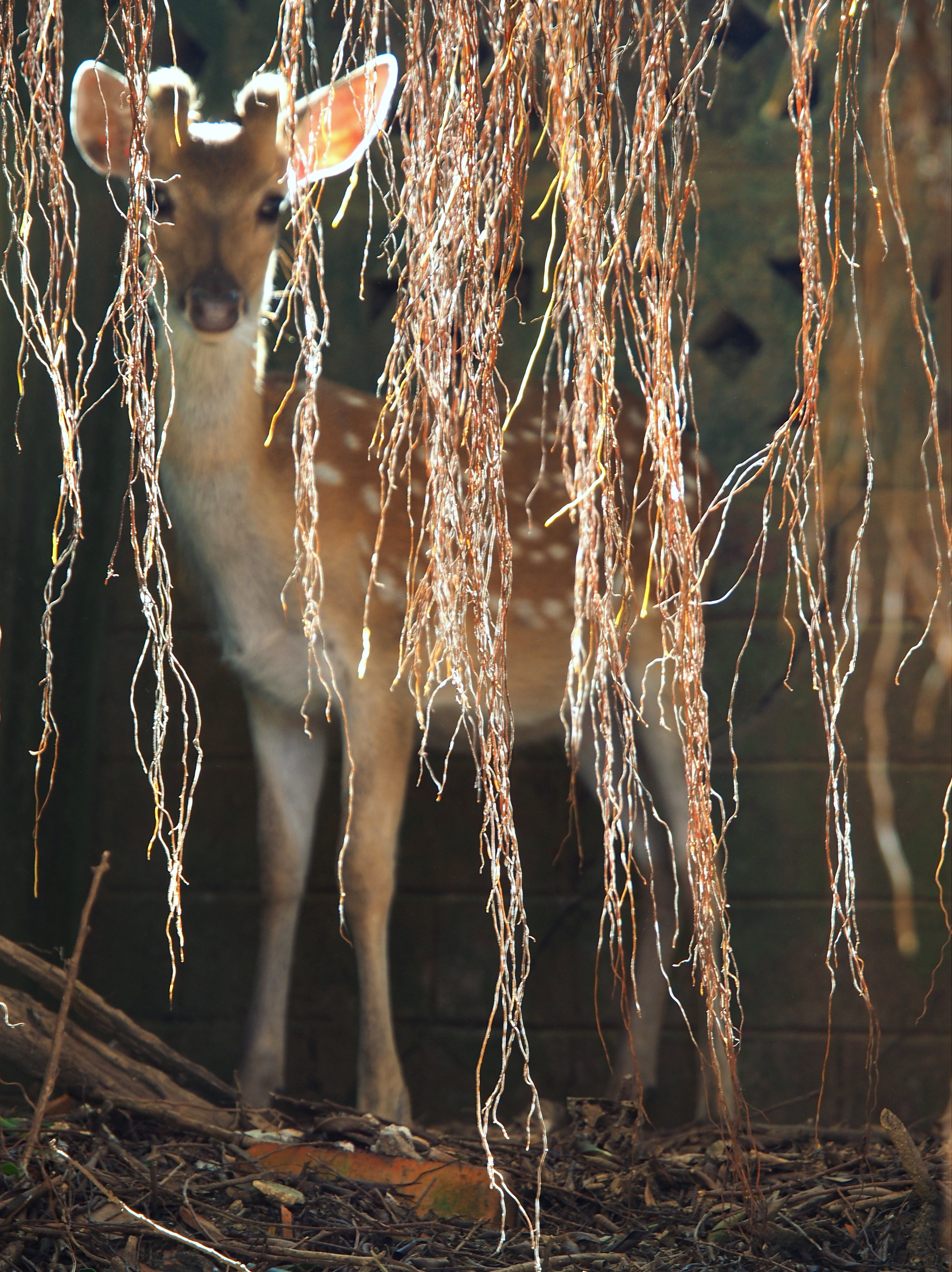
Formosan sika deer on Daqiu Island (Matsu National Scenic Area)

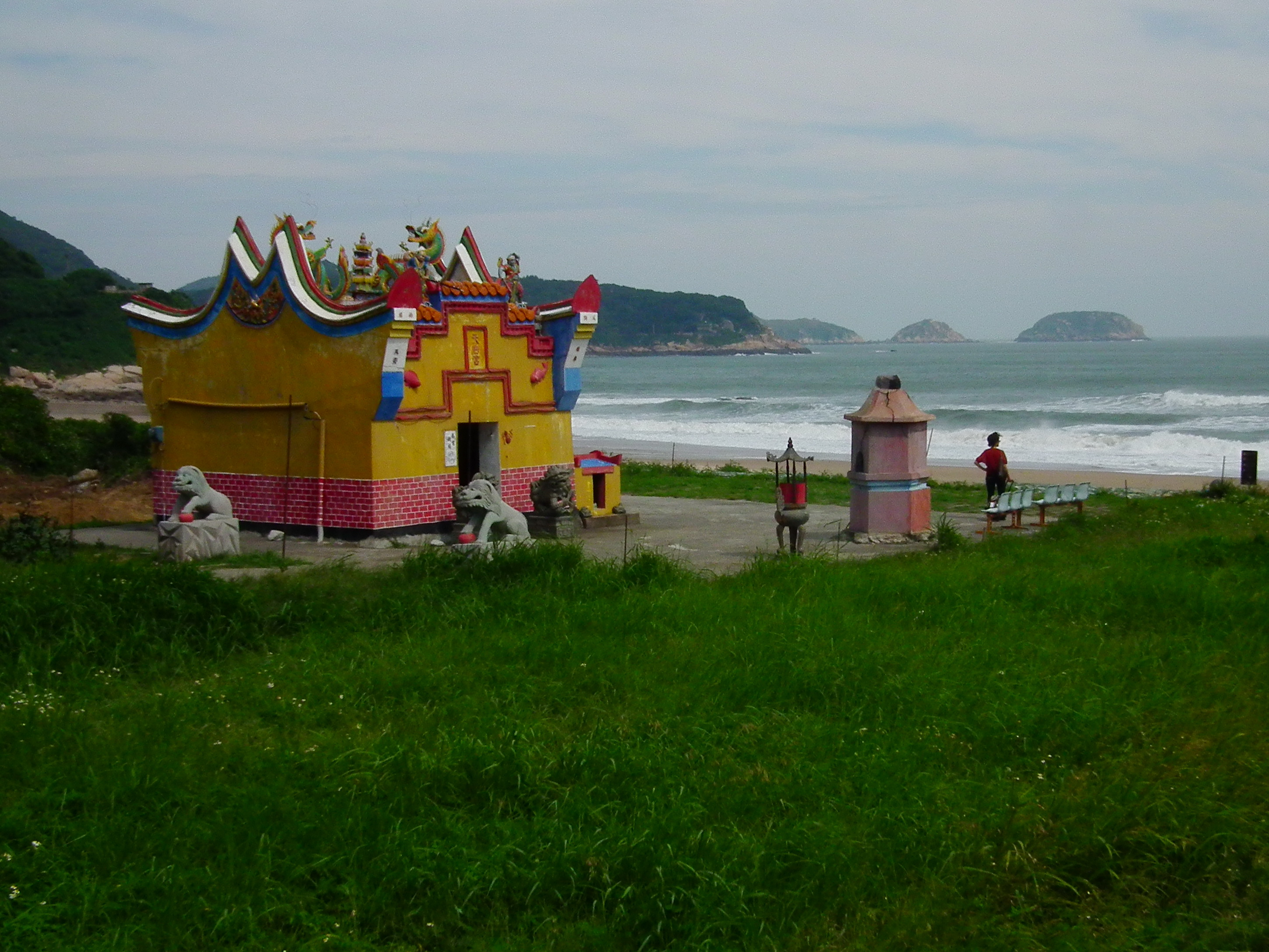
Banli Tianhou Temple

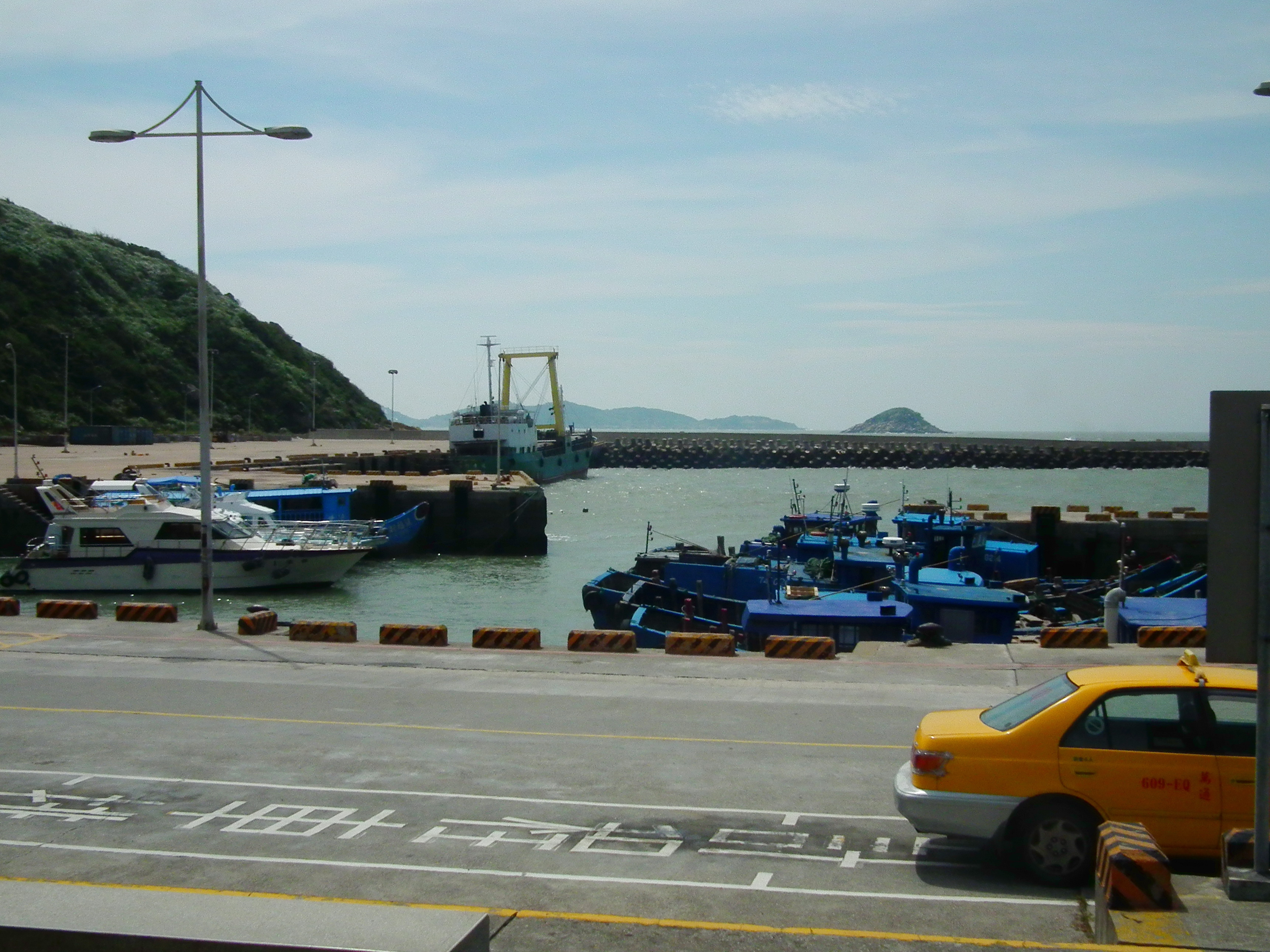
Baisha Harbor

== See also ==
- List of islands in the East China Sea
- List of islands of Taiwan
