= Daqiu Island =

Island west of Taiwan

Coordinates: 26°14′49″N 120°00′02″E

Native name: 大坵島 (Chinese)
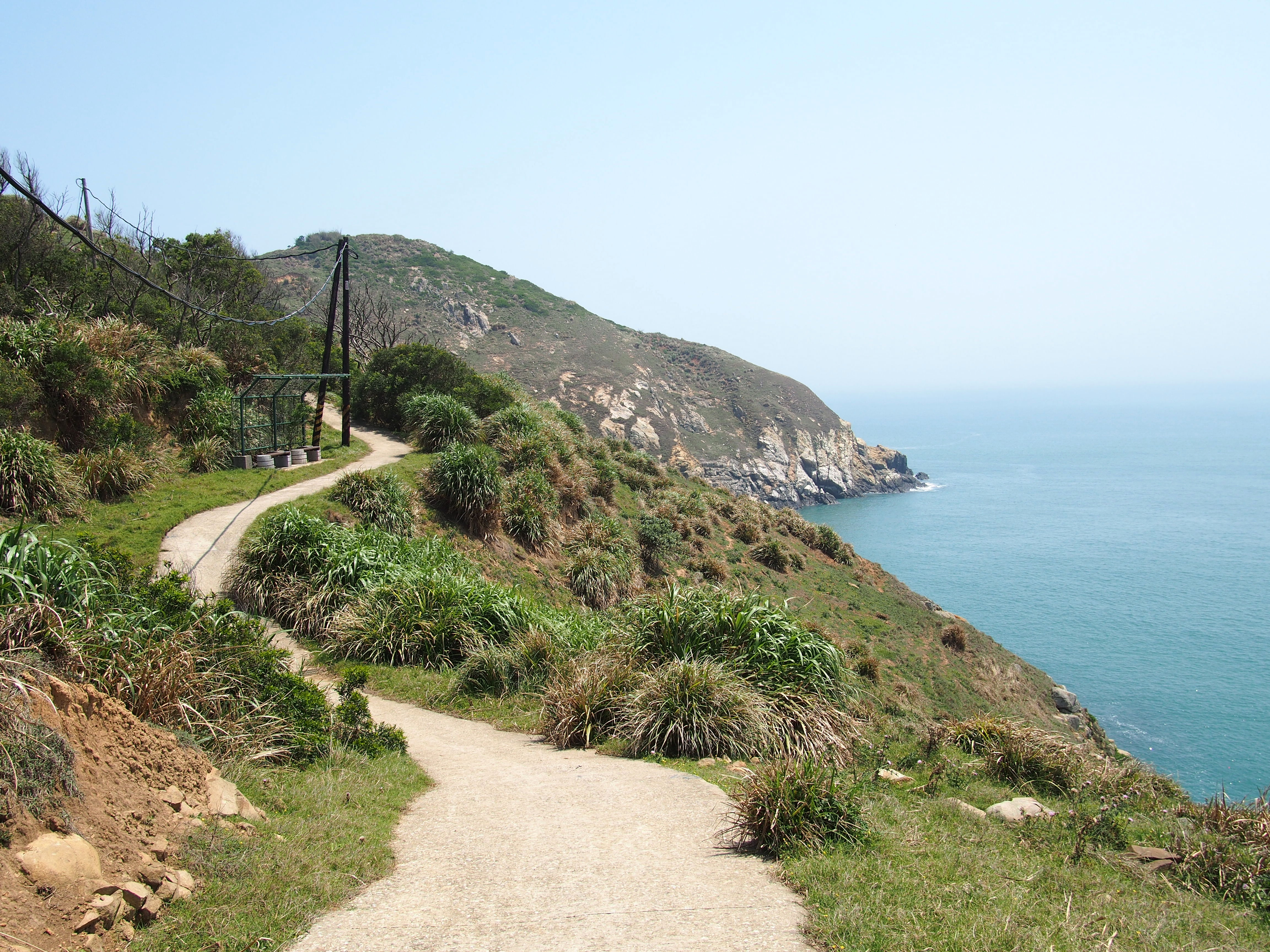

- Location in the East China Sea

Geography
- Location: north of Beigan Island, Beigan Township, Lienchiang County (the Matsu Islands), Fujian, Republic of China (Taiwan)
- Area: 0.53 km^{2} (0.20 sq mi)

Administration
- Republic of China (Taiwan)
- Province: Fujian (streamlined)
- County: Lienchiang (the Matsu Islands)
- Rural Township: Beigan

Demographics
- Population: 1 (2018)

Additional information
- Time zone: National Standard Time (UTC+8)

Daqiu Island (Ta Chiu/Tachiu) (Chinese: 大坵島; pinyin: Dàqiū Dǎo; Wade–Giles: Ta^{4}-chʻiu^{1} Tao^{3}; Foochow Romanized: Duâi-kiŭ-dō̤) is an island in the East China Sea, part of Beigan Township, Lienchiang County (the Matsu Islands), Fujian Province, Republic of China (Taiwan). The island has been uninhabited; it is open to the public. The smaller Xiaoqiu Island (小坵島) is located to the northeast of Daqiu Island.

In October 2020, a bridge between Daqiu Island and Beigan Island was under construction.

== Overview ==
The Lienchiang County government operates a ferry service to the island during the summer. The island can be reached during the off season by chartering a boat.

The island is known for its population of Formosan sika deer. A toxic invasive plant species, Solanum pseudocapsicum, now occupies nearly ten percent of the area of the island and is a threat to the deer population.

A school that was built on the island in 1965 is now abandoned.

== Demographics ==
During the 20th century, several hundred residents and military personnel lived on the island.

In 1970, 280 people from 45 families lived on the island.

On the afternoon of April 7, 1990, Chen Chin-Kuan (陳金官) and his family left the island to live on Beigan (Peikan), leaving only military personnel remaining on the island.

In 1996, the defense forces left the island. On August 15, 1998, the military personnel stationed on the island left the island, leaving the island uninhabited. Since that time, one person had taken up residence on the island.

As of March 2023, the island is uninhabited.

== Gallery ==
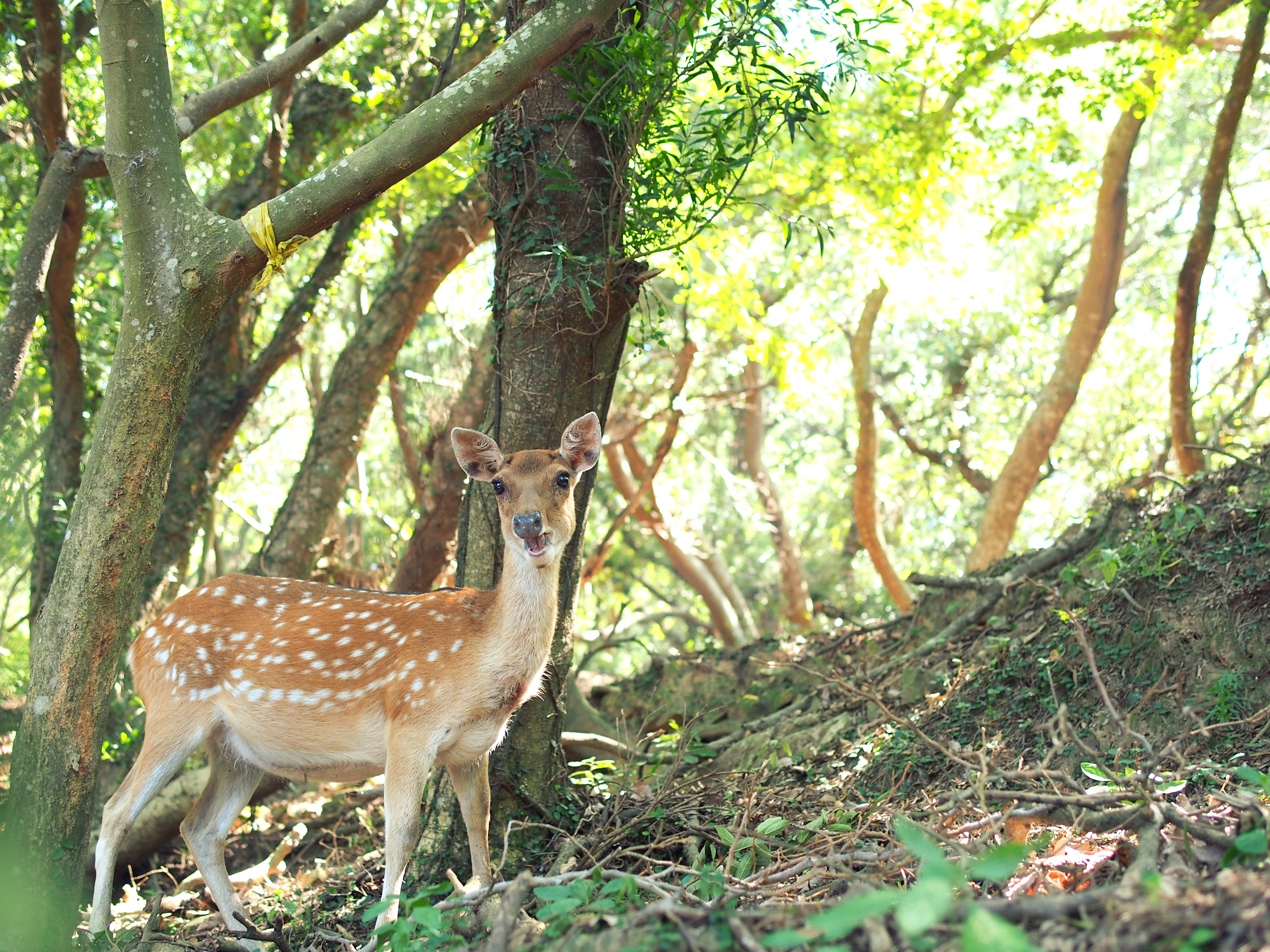
A Formosan sika deer on the island

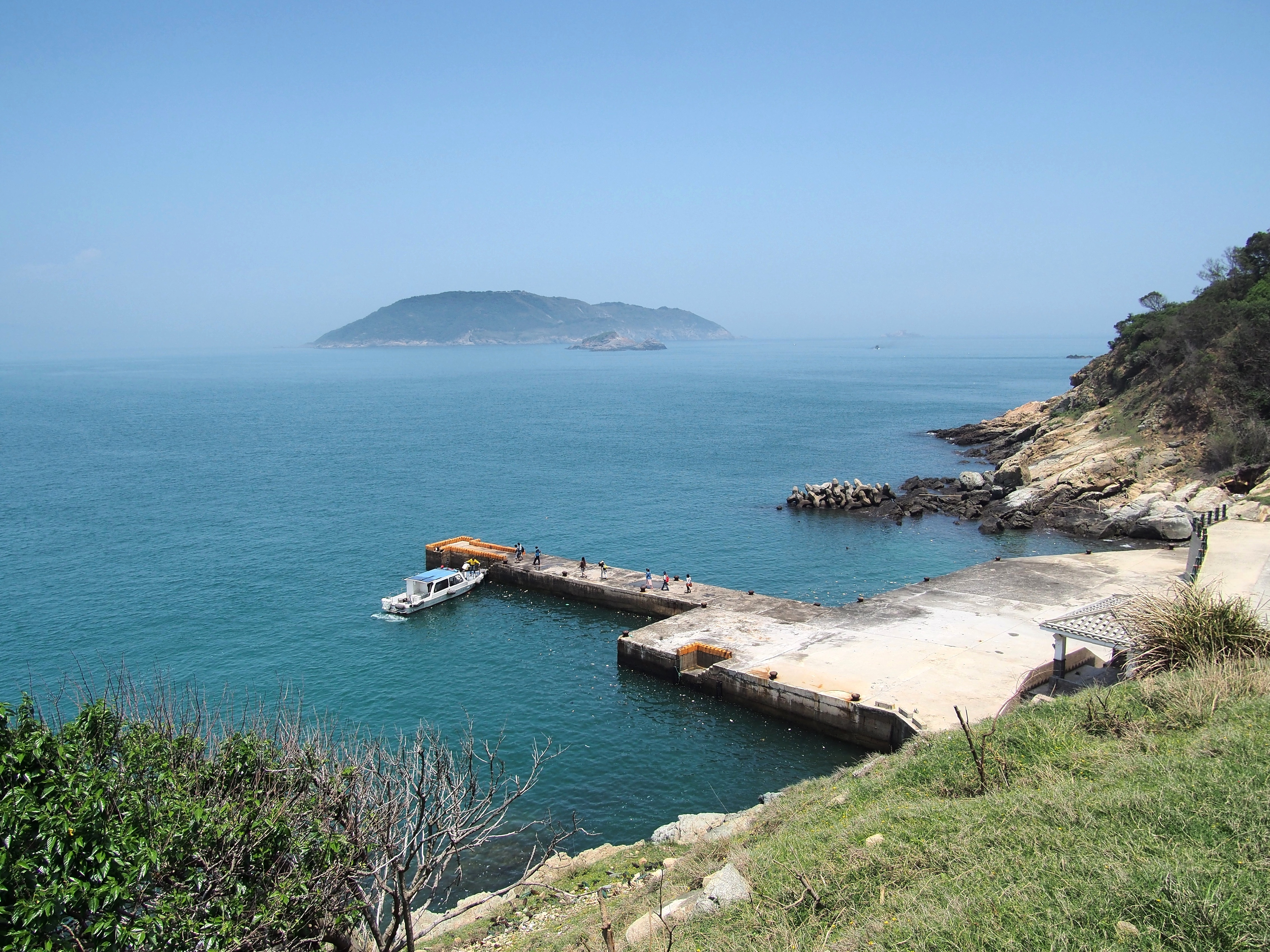
Daqiu Island dock

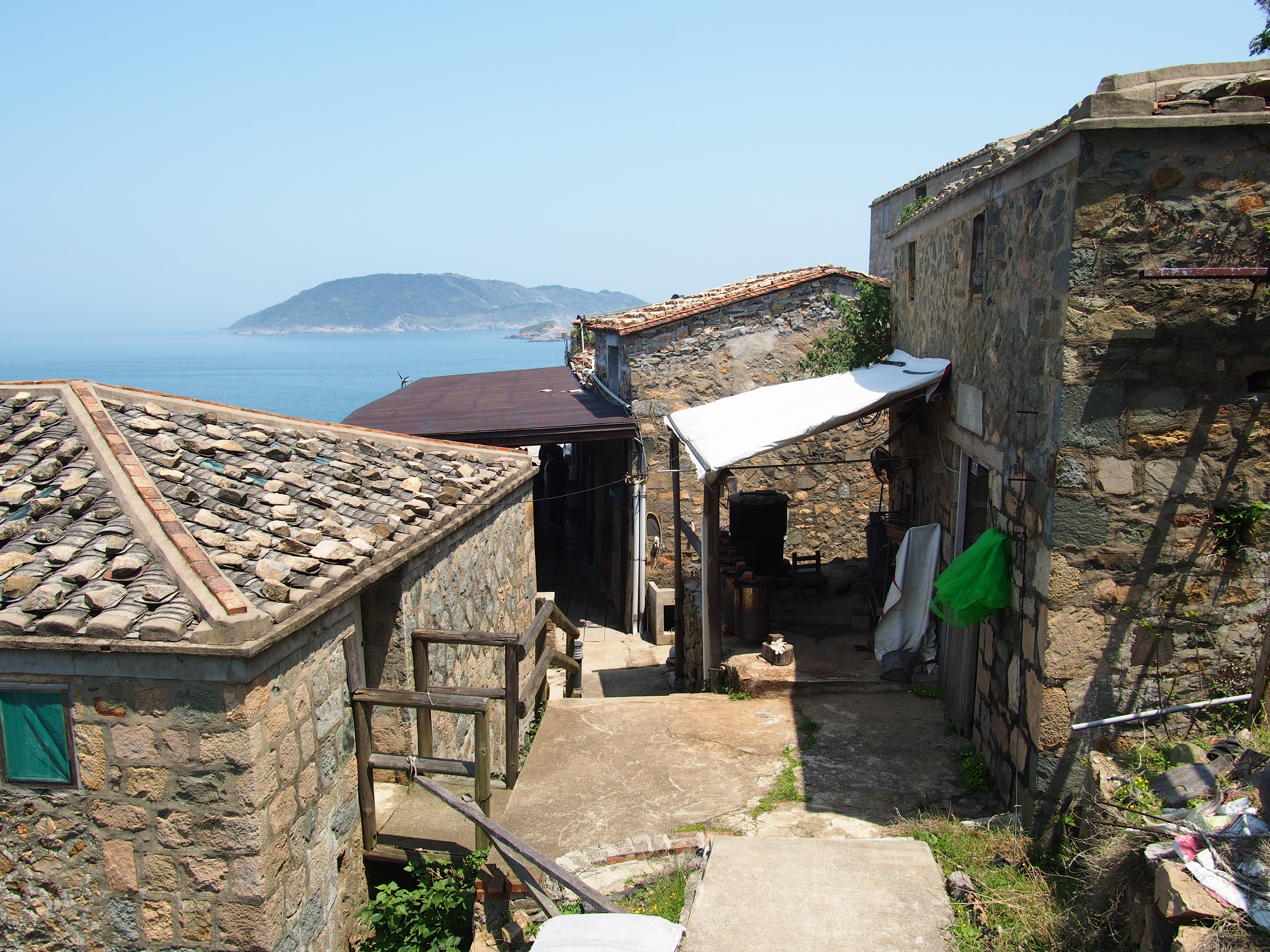
Buildings of the former village

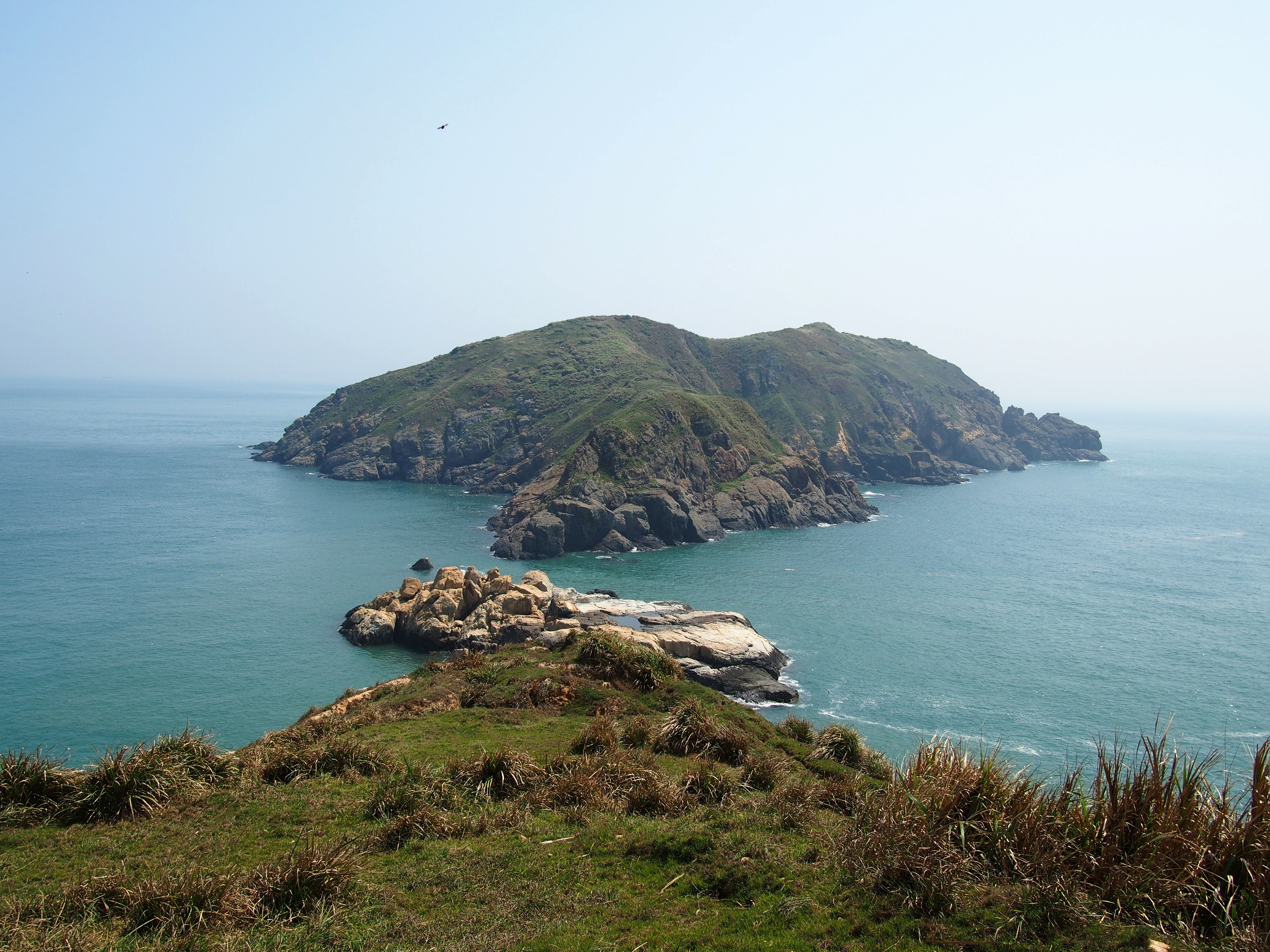
View of nearby Xiaoqiu Island

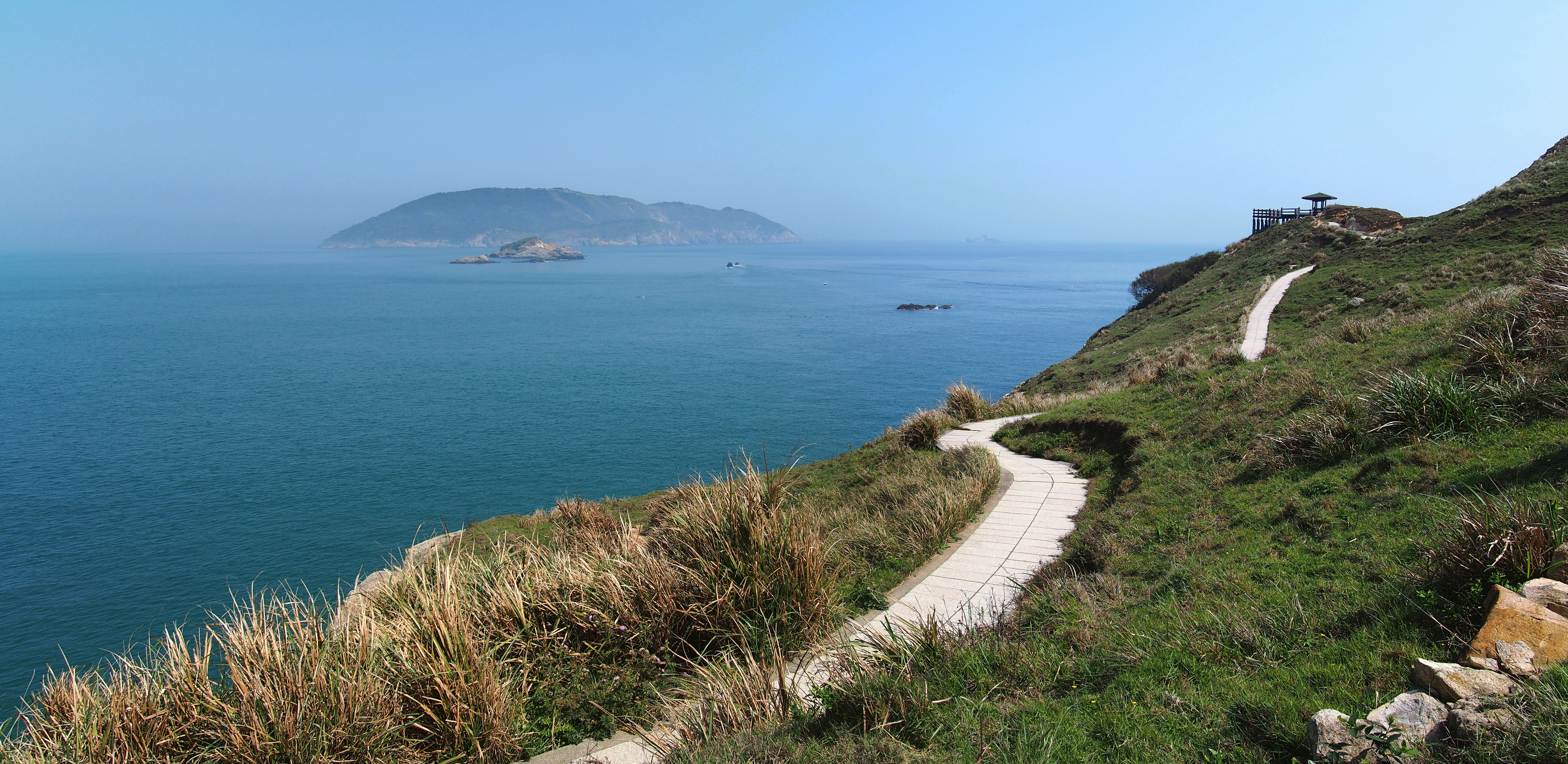
Daqiu Island Walkway
(with Gaodeng Island in the distance)

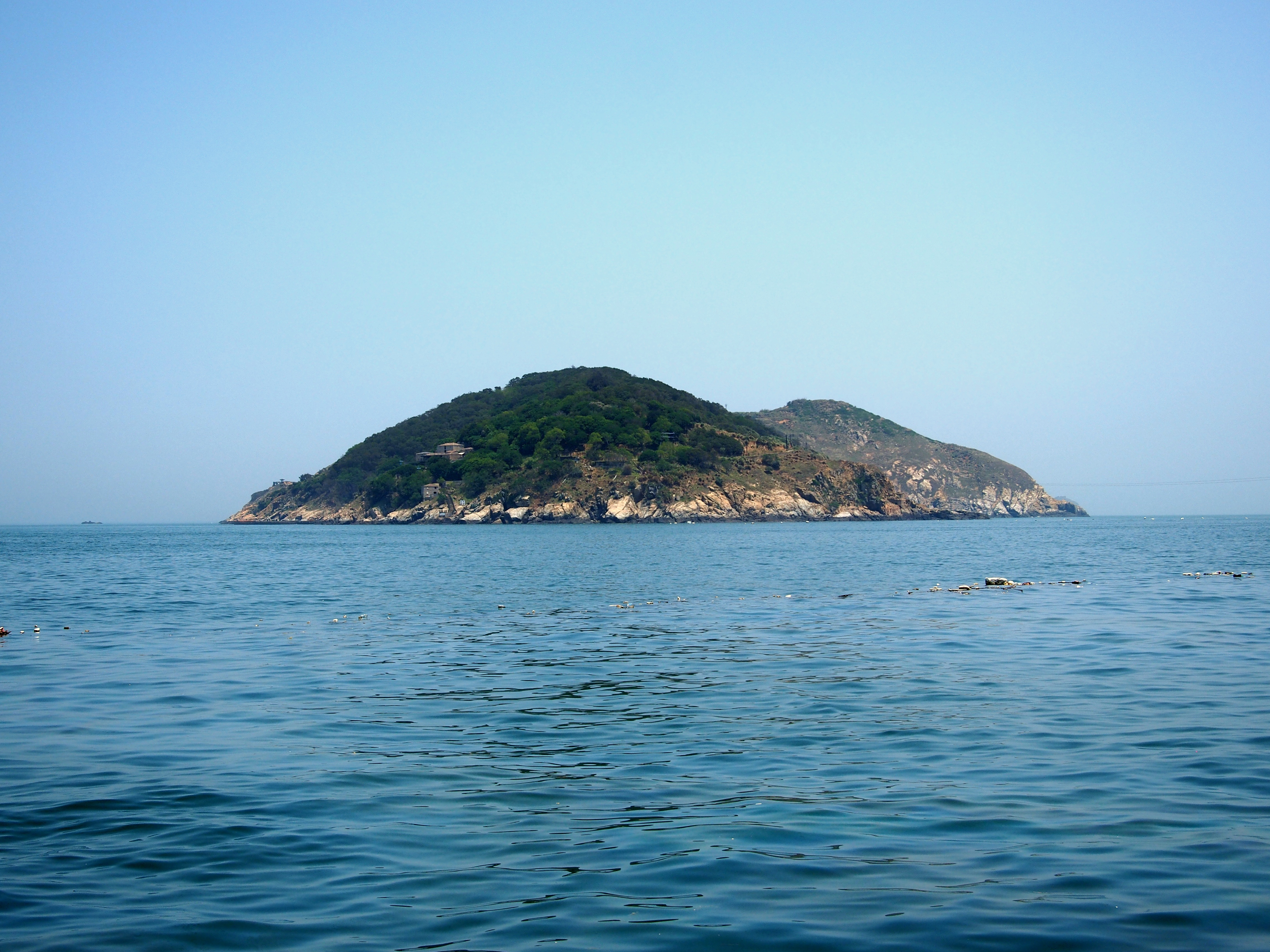
Daqiu Island

== See also ==
- Cisco, Utah, another ghost town with one modern resident
- List of islands in the East China Sea
- List of islands of Taiwan
- The similarly named Daqiu and Xiaoqiu of Wuqiu, Kinmen
