= Turtle Island (Matsu) =

Island in Beigan, Lienchiang, Taiwan

Native name: 龜島
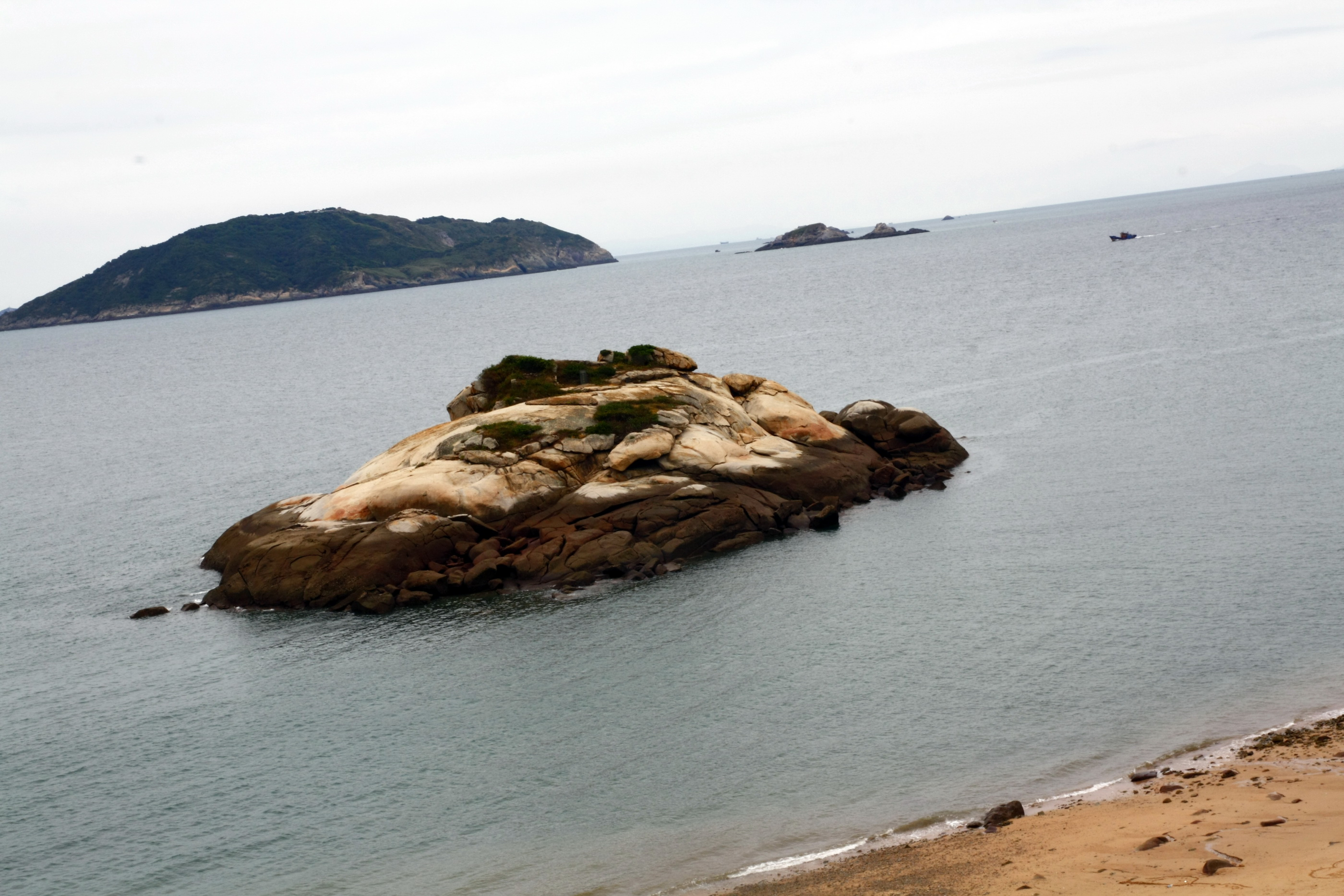

- Taiwan

Geography
- Location: Off the coast of Qinbi (Chinbi) Village on Beigan Island, Beigan, Lienchiang, Taiwan
- Coordinates: 26°13′35.9″N 119°58′57.8″E
- Archipelago: Matsu Islands
- Total islands: 1

The Turtle Island (traditional Chinese: 龜島; simplified Chinese: 龟岛; pinyin: Guī Dǎo; Foochow Romanized: Gŭi-dō̤) is an island in Beigan Township, Lienchiang County, Taiwan.

== Geology ==
The island composes of granite rock which rises above sea water level. Its cracked surface makes it look like a gigantic turtle resting in the sea.

== Gallery ==
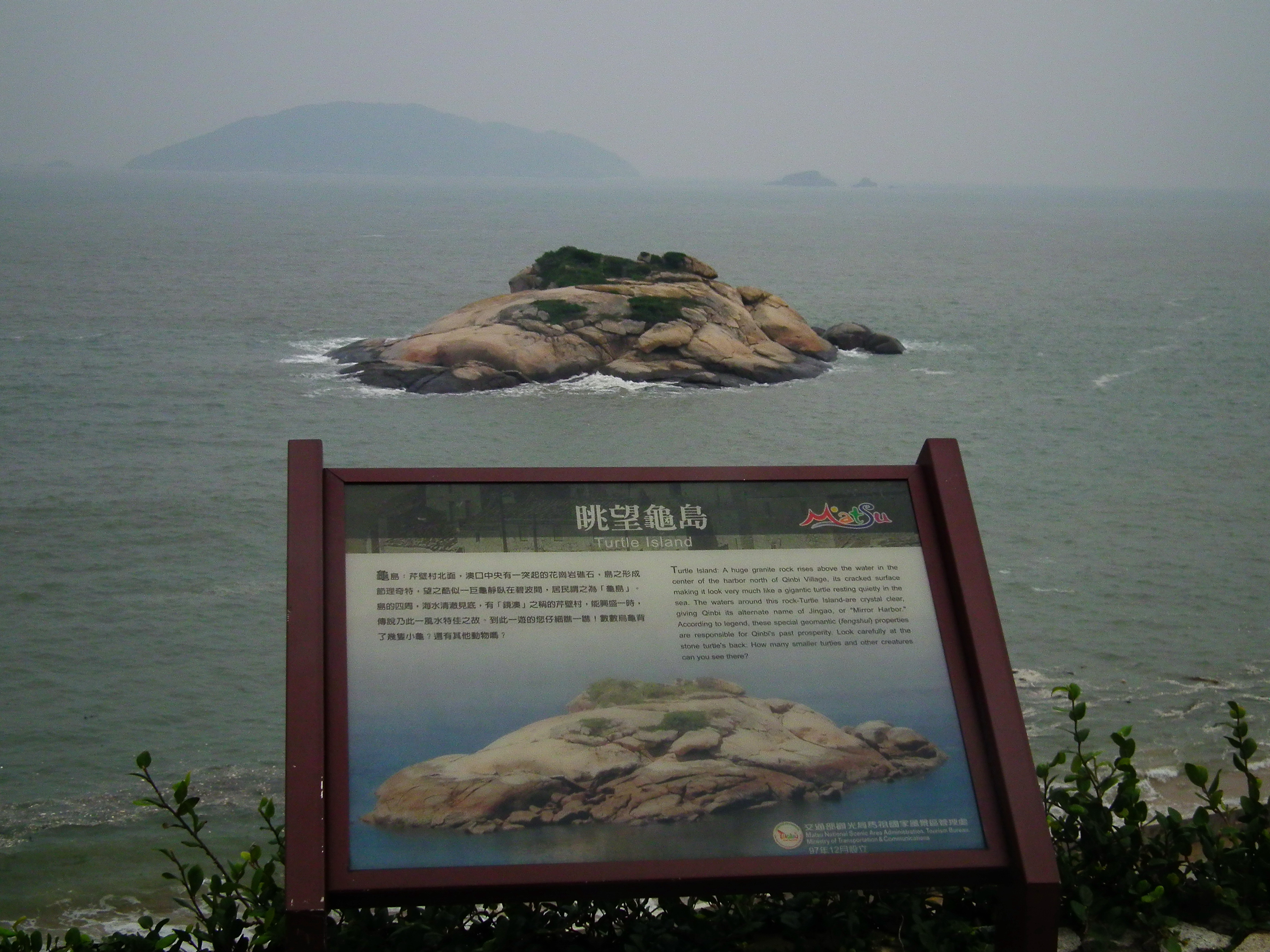
Turtle Island
(with Gaodeng Island in the background)

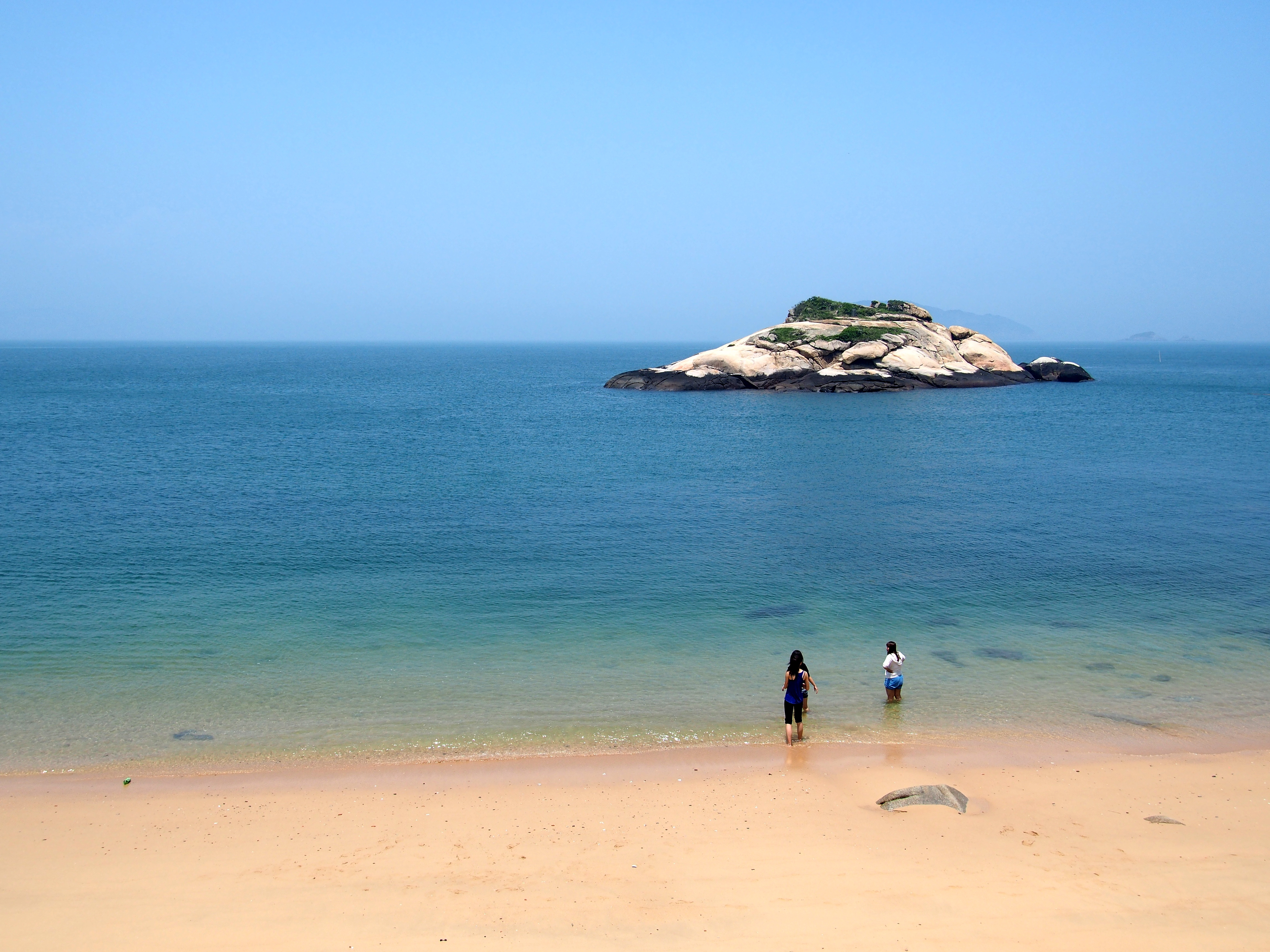
Turtle Island closeup

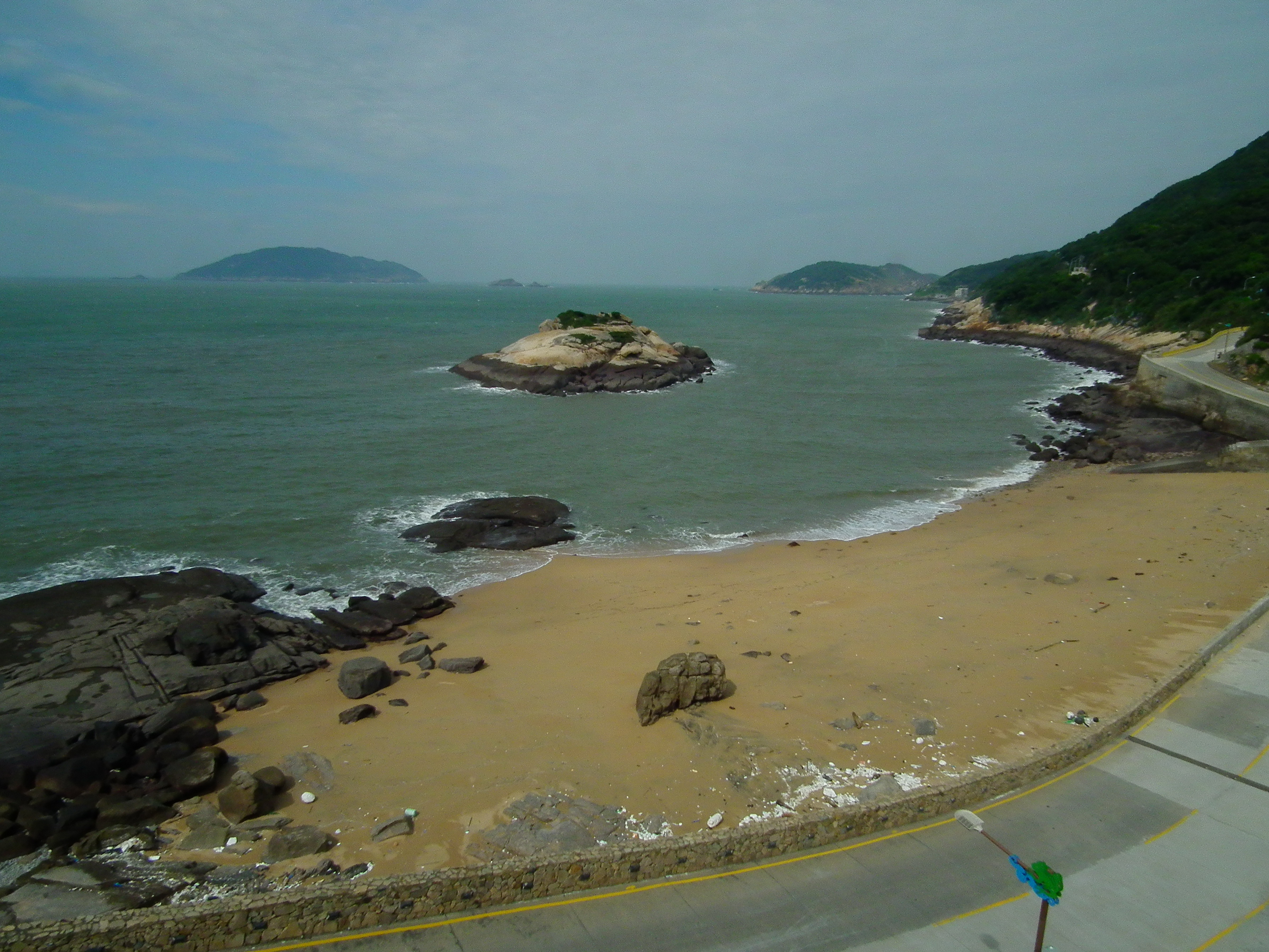
Turtle Island on Mirror Bay

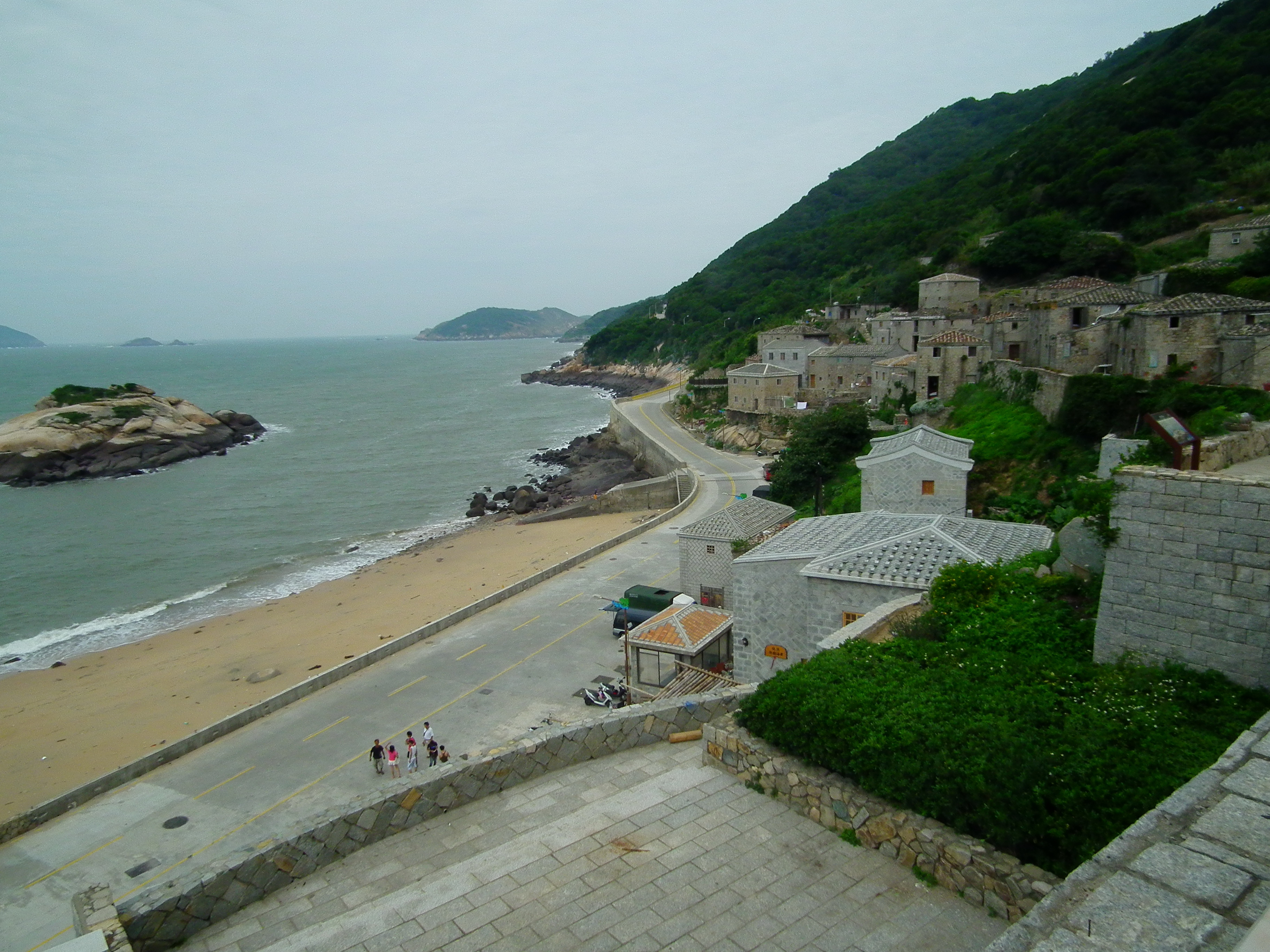
Turtle Island and Qinbi (Chinbi) Village

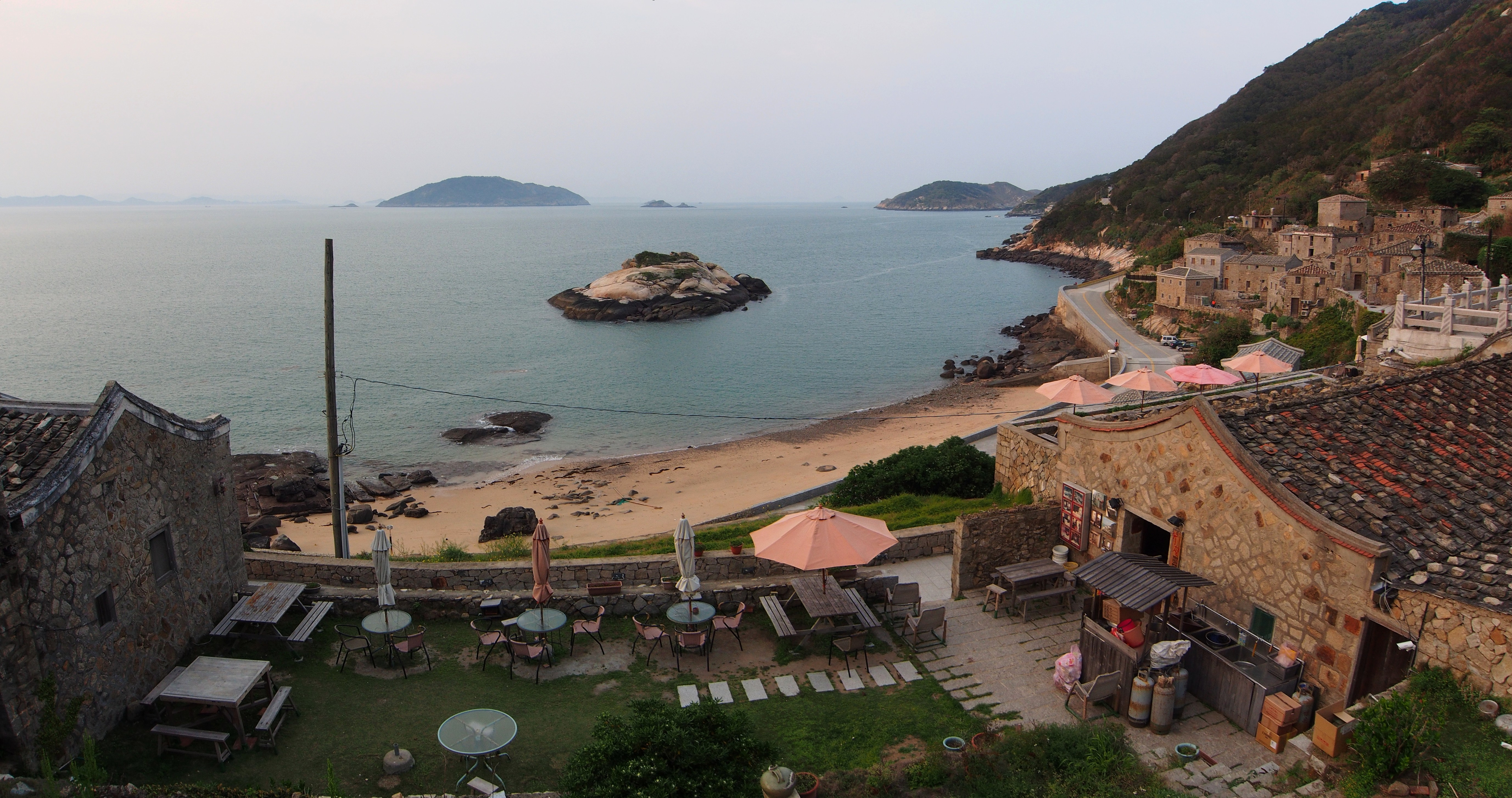
Turtle Island and surrounding area

== See also ==
- List of tourist attractions in Taiwan
- List of islands of Taiwan
