= Niaoyu =

Island in Baisha, Penghu, Taiwan

Coordinates: 23°39′40″N 119°39′37″E

Niaoyu (Traditional Chinese: 鳥嶼) is an island in the Penghu Archipelago,located off the eastern coast of Baisha Island and northeast of Yuanbei Island. Administratively, it belongs to Baisha Township in Penghu County, Taiwan.

== Overview ==
Niaoyu covers an area of approximately 26.5 hectares and has a coastline of about 2.5 kilometers. The island's terrain is lower in the north and higher in the center, composed of basalt. The terrain is lofty and impressive. Facing the northeast, the island has long been subjected to the northeast monsoon and strong sea waves, resulting in intense wind and sea erosion. This has created a well-developed and rich coastal landscape. The eastern coast features columnar basalt formations that extend to the northern coast, forming towering and majestic sea cliffs. At the top, a lighthouse guides ships navigating the northern waters, marking the highest elevation in the northern sea area of Penghu.
