= List of islands of Taiwan =

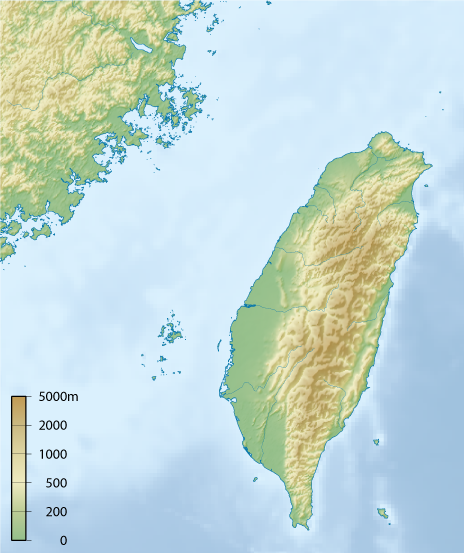
Map of Taiwan

The islands comprising the Taiwan Area under the jurisdiction of the Republic of China (ROC) are classified into various island groups. The island of Taiwan, also known as Formosa, is the largest island and the main component of the ROC-controlled territories. Islands that are claimed by the ROC but not administered, including those administered by the People's Republic of China (PRC), and those disputed with other countries such as the Tiaoyutai Islands (Senkaku Islands) and most of the South China Sea Islands, are excluded from this list.

At the adoption of Additional Articles of the Constitution of the Republic of China in the 1990s, these islands collectively form the "Free area of the Republic of China" or known alternatively as "Taiwan Area", which legally defines the territorial extent under the actual control of the ROC government.

Some Taiwanese islands have various translations in English due to different systems of romanization in Chinese language in use, or derivation of differing linguistic origins from Mandarin, Hokkien, indigenous languages or other foreign languages. Some islands also have different names derived from particular historical periods which remain in use to this day.

== Archipelagos of Taiwan ==
There are in total of 168 islands which can be classified into the following geographical units:

Geographical unit name	Chinese	Mandarin (Pinyin)	Taiwanese (Pe̍h-ōe-jī)	Hakka (Pha̍k-fa-sṳ)	Other name	Number of islands	Major islands	Provincial-level division
Taiwan	臺灣	Táiwān	Tâi-oân	Thòi-vàn	Formosa	22	Taiwan, Orchid, Green, Lamay, Guishan	Taiwan Province, Taipei Municipality, Taichung Municipality, Kaohsiung Municipality, New Taipei Municipality, Tainan Municipality, Taoyuan Municipality
Penghu	澎湖	Pénghú	Phêⁿ-ô	Phàng-fù	Pescadores	90	Penghu, Xiyu, Baisha, Cimei, Wang'an	Taiwan Province
Kinmen	金門	Jīnmén	Kim-mn̂g	Kîm-mùn	Quemoy	numerous	Kinmen, Lieyu, Dadan, Erdan	Fuchien Province
Matsu	馬祖	Mǎzǔ	Má-chó͘	Mâ-chú		36	Nangan, Beigan, Dongyin, Xiyin, Dongju, Xiju	Fuchien Province
Wuqiu	烏坵	Wūqiū	O͘-khiu	Vû-hiu	Ockseu	2	Daqiu, Xiaoqiu	Fuchien Province
Tungsha/Dongsha	東沙	Dōngshā	Tang-soa	Tûng-sâ	Pratas	1	Pratas Island	Kaohsiung Municipality
Nansha	南沙	Nánshā	Lâm-soa	Nàm-sâ	Spratly	2	Taiping Island, Zhongzhou Reef	Kaohsiung Municipality

There are four contemporary geopolitical definitions of the extent of "Taiwan":
1. The state, a.k.a. the "Republic of China" (ROC), including all 168 islands administered by the ROC;
2. The traditional Taiwan region (本島地區), excluding Kinmen, Matsu, and Wuqiu, which are traditionally parts of Fujian Province, and also excluding the ROC-controlled South China Sea Islands;
3. The traditional region without Penghu, which is sometimes regarded as a separate region;
4. The main island of Taiwan alone, excluding all of the nearby small islands.

Note: The Senkaku Islands, which are controlled by Japan, are disputed by the PRC (People's Republic of China) and the ROC as being a part of Taiwan (known as "Tiaoyutai" in Taiwanese Mandarin). Japan administers the Senkaku Islands as a part of the Ryukyu Islands.

== List of major islands by area ==
Taiwanese islands over 5 km^{2} in area
Order	Name	Chinese	Taiwanese	Hakka	Geographical unit	Administrative divisions		Area (km^{2})	Note
Order	Name	Chinese	Taiwanese	Hakka	Geographical unit	Second-level (county)	Third-level (township)	Area (km^{2})	Note
1	Taiwan Main Island (Formosa)	臺灣本島	Tâi-oân pún-tó	Thòi-vàn pún-tó	Taiwan	Multiple special municipalities, counties, and autonomous municipalities	Multiple districts, mountain indigenous districts, county-administered cities, and townships	35,808	
2	Kinmen Main Island	金門本島	Kim-mn̂g pún-tó	Kîm-mùn pún-tó	Kinmen	Kinmen County	Jincheng Township (Urban; County seat), Jinhu Township (Urban), Jinsha Township (Urban), Jinning Township (Rural)	134.25	
3	Penghu Main Island	澎湖本島	Phêⁿ-ô pún-tó	Phàng-fù pún-tó	Penghu	Penghu County	Magong City (County seat), Huxi Township (Rural)	65.41	
4	Orchid Island	蘭嶼	Lân-sū	Làn-yí	Taiwan	Taitung County	Lanyu Township (Mountain indigenous)	46.82	
5	Xiyu Island	西嶼	Sai-sū	Sî-yí	Penghu	Penghu County	Xiyu Township (Rural)	17.84	
–	Waisanding Shoal	外傘頂洲	Gōa-sòaⁿ-téng-chiu	Ngoi-san táng-chû	Taiwan	Yunlin County	Kouhu Township (Rural)	17.22	Taiwan's largest natural offshore shoal
6	Green Island	綠島	Le̍k-tó	Liu̍k-tó	Taiwan	Taitung County	Lyudao Township (Rural)	15.09	
7	Lesser Kinmen Island	小金門島	Sió-kim-mn̂g-tó	Séu-kîm-mùn-tó	Kinmen	Kinmen County	Lieyu Township (Rural)	14.85	
8	Baisha Island	白沙島	Pe̍h-soa-tó	Pha̍k-sâ-tó	Penghu	Penghu County	Baisha Township (Rural)	13.88	
9	Nangan Island	南竿島	Lâm-kan-tó	Nàm-kôn-tó	Matsu	Lienchiang County	Nangan Township (Rural; County seat)	10.43	
10	Cimei Island	七美嶼	Chhit-bí-tó	Chhit-mî-yí	Penghu	Penghu County	Cimei Township (Rural)	7.59	
11	Liuqiu Island	琉球嶼	Liû-khiû-sū	Liù-khiù-yí	Taiwan	Pingtung County	Liuqiu Township (Rural)	6.80	
12	Wang'an Island	望安島	Bāng-oaⁿ-tó	Mong-ôn-tó	Penghu	Penghu County	Wang'an Township (Rural)	6.74	
13	Beigan Island	北竿島	Pak-kan-tó	Pet-kôn-tó	Matsu	Lienchiang County	Beigan Township (Rural)	6.44	

== List of islands by geographical unit ==
=== Taiwan proper ===
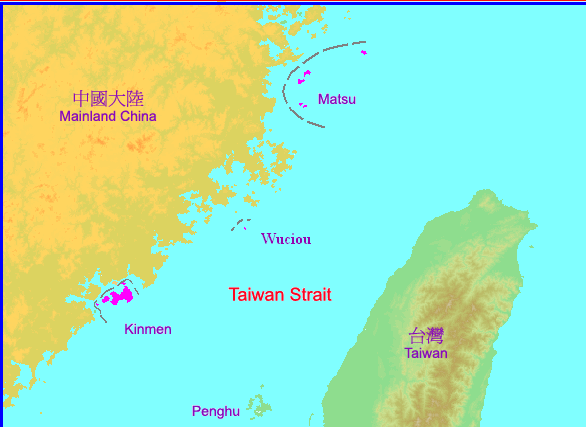
Location map of outlying islands governed by Taiwan

Penghu Islands

- Taiwan Main Island (Formosa; 臺灣島)
  - Kaohsiung City
    - Cijin Island (旗津島); formerly a longshore bar connected to the island of Taiwan at the southern tip, this link was severed in 1975 due to Kaohsiung Port construction.
  - Keelung City
    - Keelung Islet (基隆嶼)
    - Hoping Island (和平島)
    - The Three Northern Islands (北方三島)
      - Huaping Islet (花瓶嶼)
      - Mianhua Islet (棉花嶼), the easternmost island under the actual control of the Republic of China
      - Pengjia Islet (彭佳嶼)
  - Nantou County
    - Lalu Island (拉魯島); a lake island within the Sun Moon Lake
  - New Taipei City
    - Twin Candlestick Islets (Zhútái Shuāng Yǔ; 燭臺雙嶼)
  - Pingtung County
    - Liuqiu Island (Lamay Islet; 琉球嶼)
    - Qixingyan Reef (Seven star reefs; 七星岩)
  - Taitung County
    - Green Island (Lyudao, Samasana; 綠島)
    - Orchid Island (Lanyu, Ponso no Tao, Botel Tobago; 蘭嶼)
    - Lesser Orchid Island (Hsiao Lanyu, Jimagaod; 小蘭嶼)
    - Sanxiantai Island (三仙台)
  - Yilan County
    - Guishan Island / Gueishan Island (Turtle Mount; 龜山島)
    - Guiluan Island (Kuei-luan Tao, Kiran-to; 龜卵島, 龜卵嶼)
  - Hualien County
    - Ciporan Island

=== Penghu/Pescadores ===
- Penghu County (Penghu Islands/Pescadores Islands; 澎湖群島)
  - Penghu Main Island (澎湖島)
  - Hujing Island (Hujing Islet, Huching Island; 虎井嶼)
  - Tongpan Island (桶盤嶼)
  - Baisha Islands/Baisha Township (白沙群島)
    - Baisha Main Island (白沙島)
    - Jibei Island (吉貝嶼)
    - Chungtun (Zhongtun) Island (中屯嶼)
    - Yuanbei Island (員貝嶼)
    - Tiejhen (Tiezhen) Island (鐵砧嶼)
    - Gupo Island (姑婆嶼)
    - Xianjiao Island (險礁嶼)
    - Bird Island (鳥嶼)
    - Mudou Island (目斗嶼)
  - Siyu (Yuwong, Yü-weng Tao, Gyoō-tō; 西嶼, 漁翁島)
    - Xiaomen Yu (Siaomen Islet, Hsiao-men hsü, Shō-mon-sho; 小門嶼)
    - Haiqian Reef (海墘礁)
  - Cimei (Qimei;七美嶼)
  - Wang-an (望安島)
    - Hua Islet (花嶼)
    - Mau Islets (貓嶼)
    - Cau Islet (草嶼)
    - Nan Yun (南塭/南𥔋)
    - Maanshan Islet (馬鞍山嶼)
    - Jiangjyunao Islet (Chiang-chün-ao hsü, Shōgunō-sho; 將軍澳嶼)
    - Chuanfanyu Reef (船帆嶼礁)
    - Toujin (頭巾)
    - Tiejhen (鐵砧)
    - West Islet (Hsi-hsü-p'ing, Sei-sūpin; 西嶼平)
    - East Islet (Tung-hsü-p'ing, Tō-sūpin; 東嶼平)
    - Siji Islet (Hsi-chi hsü, Saikichi-sho; 西吉嶼)
    - Chutou Islet (鋤頭嶼)
    - Dongji Island (Dongji Islet, Tung-chi hsü, Tō-kichi-sho; 東吉嶼)

=== Kinmen/Quemoy ===
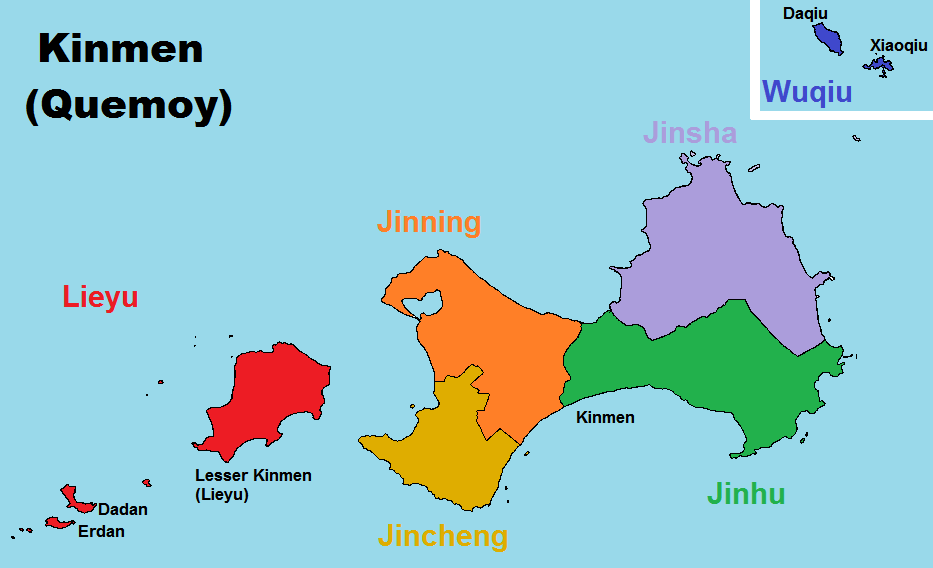
Kinmen County

- Kinmen County (Kinmen, Quemoy, Main island; 大金門, 金門本島) (main island, divided into four townships)
  - Jinhu Township
    - Dongding Island (東碇島, 東椗島) (approximately 35 km (22 mi) to the southwest)
    - Beiding Island (北碇島) (approximately 4 km (2.5 mi) to the east)
    - Mu Yu (母嶼) 24.413039°N 118.458664°E
    - etc.
  - Jinsha Township
    - Cao Islet (草嶼) 24.523335°N 118.437021°E
    - Hou Islet/Xishanyu (后嶼/西山嶼) 24.529171°N 118.41233°E
    - Baiyan Island (白巖)
    - Dabo Reef (大撥)
    - Xiaobo Reef (Siaobo Reef; 小撥)
    - Dongge (Tung-ko; 東割) 24.521109°N 118.430865°E
    - Guan'ao Jiao (Kuan-ao Chiao; 官澳礁) 24.522582°N 118.396617°E
    - Xiyuan Yu (Hsi-yüan Yü; 西園嶼) 24.518203°N 118.403333°E
    - Gou Yu (狗嶼)
    - Yangshanyu (洋山嶼)
    - etc.
  - Jinning Township
    - Daqian (大墘)
  - Jincheng Township
    - Jiangong Islet (建功嶼)
    - Hei Yan (Hei Yen; 黑巖) 24.406302°N 118.346546°E
    - Dayan Islet, Dayan Yu (Ta-yen Hsü, Ta-lu-tung; 大岩嶼) 24.389849°N 118.339489°E
    - etc.
  - Lieyu Township
    - Lesser Kinmen (Hsiao Kinmen, Lieyu; 小金門, 烈嶼) (second largest island of Kinmen County)
    - Dadan Island (大膽島)
    - Erdan Island (二膽島)
    - Fuxing Islet (Fuhsing Islet; Phaktia) (復興嶼)
    - Menghu Islet (猛虎嶼)
    - Shi Islet (Lion Islet) (獅嶼)
    - Binlang Islet (檳榔嶼)
    - Hsiao Kinmen Island (小金門島)
    - Houtouyu (後頭嶼)
    - Wu Jiao (Wu Chiao; 烏礁) 24.459722°N 118.24°E
    - Guizijiao (桂子礁)
    - Huangyu (黃嶼)
    - Sanjiaojiao/Yanyu (三腳礁/三角礁/煙嶼) 24.431981°N 118.191131°E
    - Niuxinjiao (牛心礁)
    - Chijiaojiao (赤角礁)
    - Xiaodan (Hsiao-tan, Siaodan; 小擔) 24.451683°N 118.212235°E
    - Menkou Jiao (門口礁)
    - Tu Yu ('Rabbit Islet', Tuyu, T'u Hsü; 兔嶼) 24.395924°N 118.17145°E
    - Dananjiao (大南礁)
    - Shishan (石山)
    - Sandan/Sandandao (San-tan 三膽/三擔島) 24.377596°N 118.145256°E
    - Sidan/Sidandao (Ssu-tan, Tao-sao Hsü 四膽/四擔島) 24.37777°N 118.14219°E
    - Wudan (Wu-tan 五膽/五擔) 24.374599°N 118.13847°E
    - Muyu (目嶼)
    - etc.

=== Matsu Islands ===
Lienchiang County (Matsu Islands)

- Matsu Islands (馬祖列島)
  - Beigan (Peikan; 北竿)
    - Gaodeng Island (Kaoteng; 高登島)
    - Daqiu Island (大坵)
    - Xiaoqiu (Kiao Tse 小坵)
    - Wumingdao / Bluff Head (Wu-ming Tao; 無名島) 26.236295°N 120.011882°E
    - Qiaotou (Ch’iao-t’ou; 峭頭) 26.238689°N 120.015353°E
    - Jinyu (進嶼)
    - Liang Island (亮島)
    - Langyan (浪岩) / Liang Reef (Liangjiao Reef; 亮礁)
    - Sanlianyu / Trio Rocks (三連嶼)
    - Zhongdao (中島)
    - Baimiao (白廟)
    - Laoshu (老鼠)
    - Turtle Island (亀島)
  - Nankan (Nangan; 南竿)
    - Huangguanyu (黃官嶼)
    - Liuquanjiao (劉泉礁) 26°05′07.9″N 119°57′43.4″E
    - Xiejiao (鞋礁)
    - Beiquanjiao (北泉礁)
  - Dongyin (Tungyin; 東引)
    - Xiyin (Hsiyin; 西引)
    - Beigu Reef (北固礁) 26.389633°N 120.482731°E *The northernmost island under the actual control of the Republic of China.
    - Zhongzhu Island (Chung-chu Tao; 中柱島)
    - Furong Reef (Furong Jiao; 芙蓉礁) 26.378663°N 120.483884°E
    - Shuangzijiao (雙子礁)
    - Dongsha Dao (Tung-sha Tao; 東沙島)
  - Chukuang (Jyuguang; 莒光)
    - Tungchu (Dongjyu, Dongquan; 東莒, 東犬)
    - Hsichu (Xijyu, Xiquan; 西莒, 西犬)
    - Xiniuyu (犀牛嶼)
    - Sheshan (蛇山)
    - Lintou'ao (林頭坳)
    - Dayu (大嶼)
    - Yongliou (永留嶼)

=== Wuqiu/Ockseu ===
- Wuqiu (Ockseu, Wuchiu, Wuciou; 烏坵)
  - Daqiu (Tachiu, Taciou; 大坵)
  - Xiaoqiu (Hsiaochiu; 小坵)

=== South China Sea Islands ===
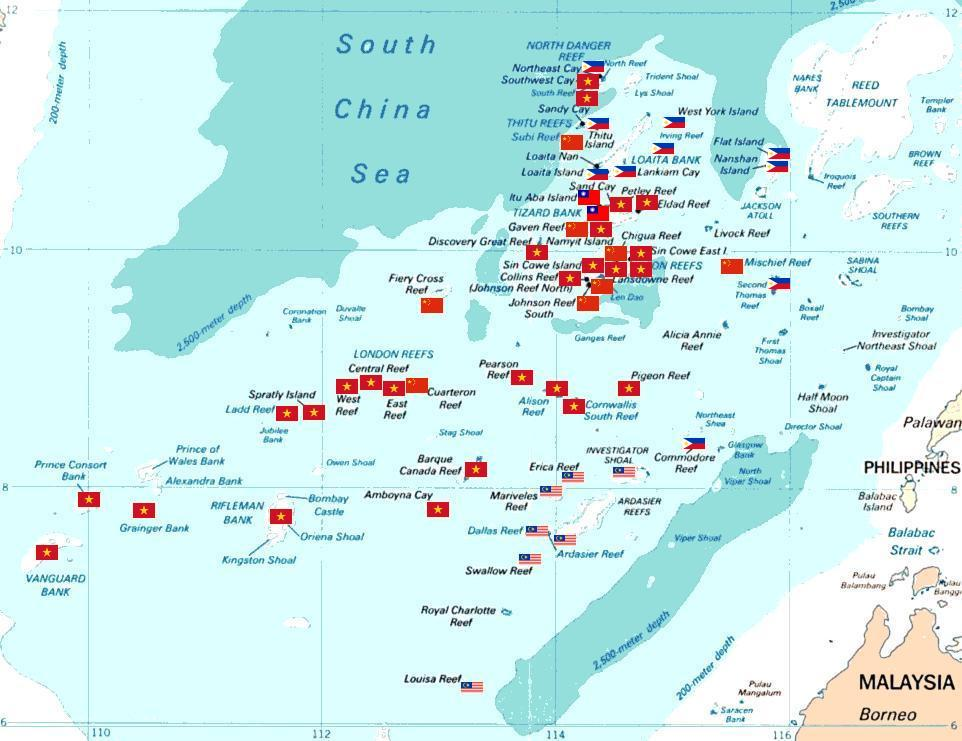
Map of various countries occupying the Spratly Islands

- South China Sea Islands (南海諸島) (Administration under Cijin District, Kaohsiung Municipality; only the following islands listed below are controlled by the ROC)
  - Pratas Island (Tungsha, Dong-sha; 東沙群島)
  - Spratly Islands (Nansha, Nan-sha; 南沙群島; disputed with several Southeast Asian countries and China)
    - Taiping (Itu Aba; 太平島)
    - Zhongzhou Reef (Chung-Chou Reef; 中洲礁)

== Disputed islands ==
The highly controversial sovereignty disputes over both the Japan-controlled Senkaku Islands and the South China Sea Islands (which are disputed and controlled by several countries) are complex with the disputed status of both Taiwan (the territories outlined in the 1951 Treaty of San Francisco) and the Republic of China (ROC) which controls Taiwan. As the ROC and the People's Republic of China (PRC) still compete their de jure claim as the sole legitimate government of the entire China, they effectively lay claim to the same extent of islands, including the South China Sea Islands and the Senkaku Islands, among others. This makes these disputes multi-layered and therefore virtually impossible to solve by following the guidelines of international law.

The ROC maintains its historical claims to all of the South China Sea Islands. They are also claimed by five other claimants, namely the PRC, Vietnam, the Philippines, Malaysia, and Brunei. The islands within the Pratas and Spratly Islands which remain under the control of the ROC are assigned to Cijin District, Kaohsiung City, thus technically defining these islands to be part of the "Taiwan Area". The United Nations considers the South China Sea to be "international waters" and does not acknowledge any of the South China Sea Islands as "true islands". The acknowledgement of these islands as "true islands" is crucial because the definition of "islands" would justify the creation of an exclusive economic zone around them, which can be used to cut off international shipping lanes and to acquire natural resources such as oil which lie beneath the ocean.

Meanwhile, the Japanese-controlled Senkaku Islands are claimed by the ROC as "Tiaoyutai Islands" within Toucheng Township, Yilan County and are considered to be part of geographic and provincial Taiwan by the ROC. The Senkaku Islands lie about 186 kilometres from the northeast of Taiwan Island, and situated roughly 330 kilometres from the east of mainland China. They form the westernmost extremity of the "Ryukyu Islands", which Japan administers as Okinawa Prefecture. The PRC also claims the Senkaku Islands as "Diaoyu Islands" as part of its claimed "Taiwan Province".

The PRC claims the islands of Taiwan and Penghu as part of its 23rd Taiwan Province, together with the Japanese-controlled Senkaku Islands (claimed as "Tiaoyutai Islands"), which are also claimed by the ROC as part of its own Taiwan Province. The PRC claims Kinmen as a county of the prefecture-level city Quanzhou, in Fujian Province. Matsu is claimed as part of Lianjiang County, part of Fuzhou, in Fujian Province. The Wuqiu islands are claimed as part of Xiuyu District, a district of the prefecture-level city Putian, in Fujian Province. Pratas Island is claimed as part of Chengqu in Shanwei (Swabue) Guangdong Province. The Nansha Islands controlled by the ROC, i.e. Taiping Island and Zhongzhou Reef, are claimed as part of Sansha, in Hainan Province. The PRC thus claims the ROC-controlled islands as part of its own Taiwan Province (Taiwan and Penghu), Fujian Province (Kinmen, Matsu, and Wuqiu), Guangdong Province (Dongsha) and Hainan Province (Nansha).

== See also ==
- Tiaoyutai Islands (釣魚臺列嶼) – de facto administered by Japan as the Senkaku Islands
- Geography of Taiwan
- List of islands
- List of islands in the South China Sea
- List of Taiwanese superlatives
- Tachen Islands (islands evacuated in 1955)
