= Koba =

Koba may refer to:

== Places ==
- Koba, Burkina Faso
- Koba, Indonesia, a town in Bangka-Belitung, Indonesia
- Koba, Faranah, Guinea
- Koba, Kindia, Guinea
- Koba Island, one of the Aru Islands of Indonesia
- Gupo Island, an island in Penghu County, Taiwan
- Fitzroy Island (Queensland), originally Koba, an island off the coast of Far North Queensland, Australia
- Niokolo-Koba National Park, a World Heritage Site and natural protected area in south eastern Senegal near the Guinea-Bissau border
- Niokolo-Koba Airport
- Kapitaï and Koba, two areas on the coast of West Africa which were the object of German colonial initiatives in 1884 and 1885. They lay between the Pongo and Dubréka rivers, south of Senegal and Gambia in modern Guinea

== People ==
- Koba, a nickname used by Joseph Stalin
- Koba (given name)
- Koba (surname), a Japanese surname

== Fictional figures ==
- Koba, a character from the 1883 novel The Patricide by Alexander Kazbegi
- Koba, a character from the 2011 film Warrior
- Koba, a fictional bonobo in the Planet of the Apes reboot series

== Arts ==
- Koba Entertainment
- Koba (play), a play by Raymond Williams, based on Stalin's life
- Koba the Dread, a 2002 non-fiction book by Martin Amis
- Koba LaD, real name Marcel Junior Loutarila, French rapper

== Others ==
- Koba language, a language of Indonesia
- Koba (sweet), a confectionery sweet
- Kutama Old Boys Association, Zimbabwe
- Koba, a plant that is indigenous to Ethiopia
