= Chuton Island =

Island in Baisha, Penghu, Taiwan

Coordinates: 23°36′57″N 119°36′26″E

Chuton Island (Traditional Chinese: 中屯嶼), also known as Chuton Islet, is a small island in Penghu County, Taiwan. It belongs to Baisha Township and has a circumference of 5.1819 kilometers. The island is the tenth largest in the Penghu Archipelago and is located between Penghu Main Island and Baisha Island. The island's shape resembles a mound, which is why it was originally named Zhongdun. During the Japanese rule of Taiwan, it was called Zhongdun Village. After the Republic of China took over Taiwan, it was renamed Chuton. Currently, it is designated as Chuton Village.
