= Chuang Chu Yu-nu =

Chinese philanthropist

- 莊朱玉女
- Born: 4 September 1920; Baisha, Penghu, Taiwan
- Died: 13 February 2015 (aged 94)
- Occupation: Philanthropist

Chuang Chu Yu-nu (Chinese: 莊朱玉女; pinyin: Zhuāng Zhū Yùnǚ; Pe̍h-ōe-jī: Chng-Chu Gio̍k-lú; 4 September 1920 – 13 February 2015) was a philanthropist in Taiwan, who was called "the patron saint of poor people". She was known for selling her "10-dollar buffet" (Taiwan Dollar, around US$0.30~0.40), and was given the nickname "Ten Dollar Grandma" (十元阿媽) or "Ten Dollar Bento Grandma" (十元便當阿媽).

== Life ==
Chu Yu-nu was born in Jibei of Baisha, Penghu on 4 September 1920. She married her husband at the age of 16, and moved with him to Kaohsiung, adding his surname Chuang to her full name. During World War II, her husband was ordered by the Japanese Empire to Southeast Asia to be a porter. After that, they both found work with Taiwan Power Company. The couple left Taipower for Kaohsiung Harbor after Chuang Chu's husband was injured climbing a telephone pole.

Chuang Chu felt that her colleagues at Kaohsiung Harbor worked very hard, so she started to run a buffet stall for the workers in 1951. It was free at first, but it cost her too much to operate, so she charged NT$10 per meal, which all you can eat. Her dishes were always rich, which the workers appreciated. She remained in business for 50 years until she fell ill. She died on 13 February 2015.

== Legacy ==
The people of Jibei named a park for Chuang Chu, in which a statue of her stands.
