= Penghu Great Bridge =

Bridge in Penghu, Taiwan

Penghu Great Bridge 澎湖跨海大橋
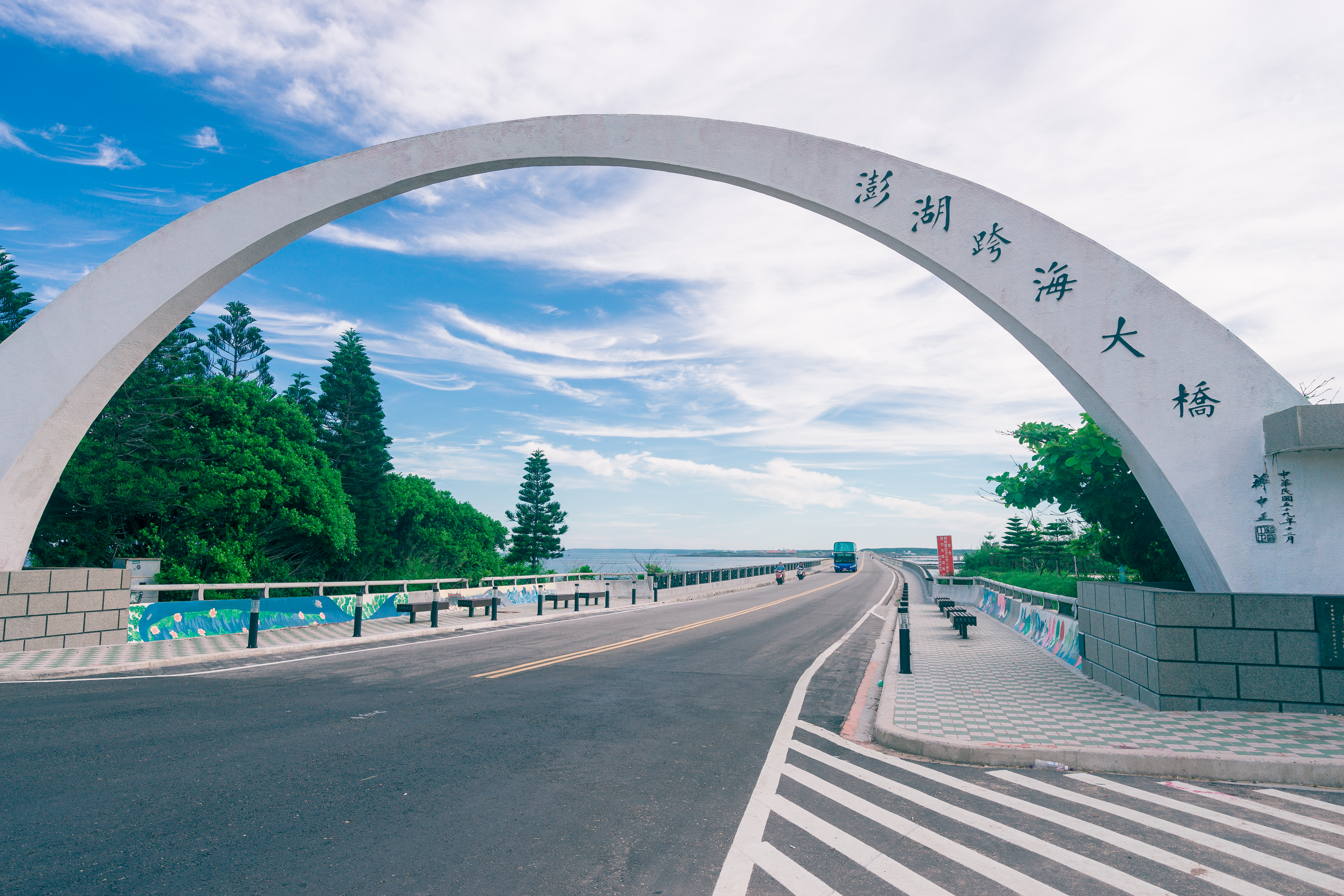
- Coordinates: 23°39′03.5″N 119°32′54.3″E
- Locale: Xiyu and Baisha in Penghu, Taiwan
- Other name: Penghu Trans-Oceanic Bridge

Characteristics
- Design: bridge
- Total length: 2,494 meters
- Width: 13 meters
- No. of lanes: 2

History
- Construction start: 1965
- Construction end: 1970
- Inaugurated: 1 January 1996
- Rebuilt: 1984

Location
- Interactive map of Penghu Great Bridge

The Penghu Great Bridge or Penghu Trans-Oceanic Bridge (traditional Chinese: 澎湖跨海大橋; simplified Chinese: 澎湖跨海大桥; pinyin: Pēnghú Kuàhǎi Dàqiáo) is a bridge in Penghu County, Taiwan. It connects Siyu Island and Baisha Main Island.

== History ==
Below the water's surface between Siyu Island and Baisha Main Island, there are reefs. The current in the region known as Roaring Gate Channel has a top speed of three meters per second and is particularly harsh during the autumn and winter, when winds blow in from the northeast. The construction of the bridge began in 1965 and was completed on 25 December 1970. The bridge was expanded in 1984 due to its erosion and collapse because of the sea wind. On 1 January 1996, it was re-inaugurated as a two-lane road bridge.

== Architecture ==
The bridge was initially 2,478 meters long and 5.1 meters wide. After renovation and expansion, it is now 2,494 meters long and 13 meters wide. It has 7 emergency spaces along the path.

== See also ==
- List of bridges in Taiwan
- Transportation in Taiwan
