= Koba (given name) =

Koba (Georgian: კობა) is a Georgian given name. Notable people with the name include:

- Koba Davitashvili (1971–2020), Georgian politician
- Koba Gogoladze (born 1973), Georgian boxer
- Koba Gurtskaia (born 1966), Georgian military officer
- Koba Gvenetadze (born 1971), Georgian economist
- Koba Jass (born 1990), Latvian ice hockey player
- Koba Kobaladze (born 1969), Georgian military officer
- Koba Shalamberidze (born 1984), Georgian footballer
- Koba Subeliani (born 1979), Georgian politician
- Koba Zakadze (born 1934), Soviet Georgian ski jumper

== History and origin ==
In turn, the name comes from the Hebrew root "qb > Yaakov," which means "to follow, to be behind." It referred to the circumstances of Jacob's birth when he held on to the heel (Hebrew: aqeb) of his older twin brother, Esau. The third patriarch of the Jewish people with whom God formed a covenant and the ancestor of the tribes of Israel, who got their names from his descendants, according to the Hebrew Bible, Jacob, the Talmud, the New Testament, the Koran, and the Baha'i writings.

In the scriptures of Georgian, Koba is a diminutive of lakob. This name means Supplanter.
