= Penghu Refugee Camp =

Former refugee camp in Penghu County, Taiwan (1977–1988)

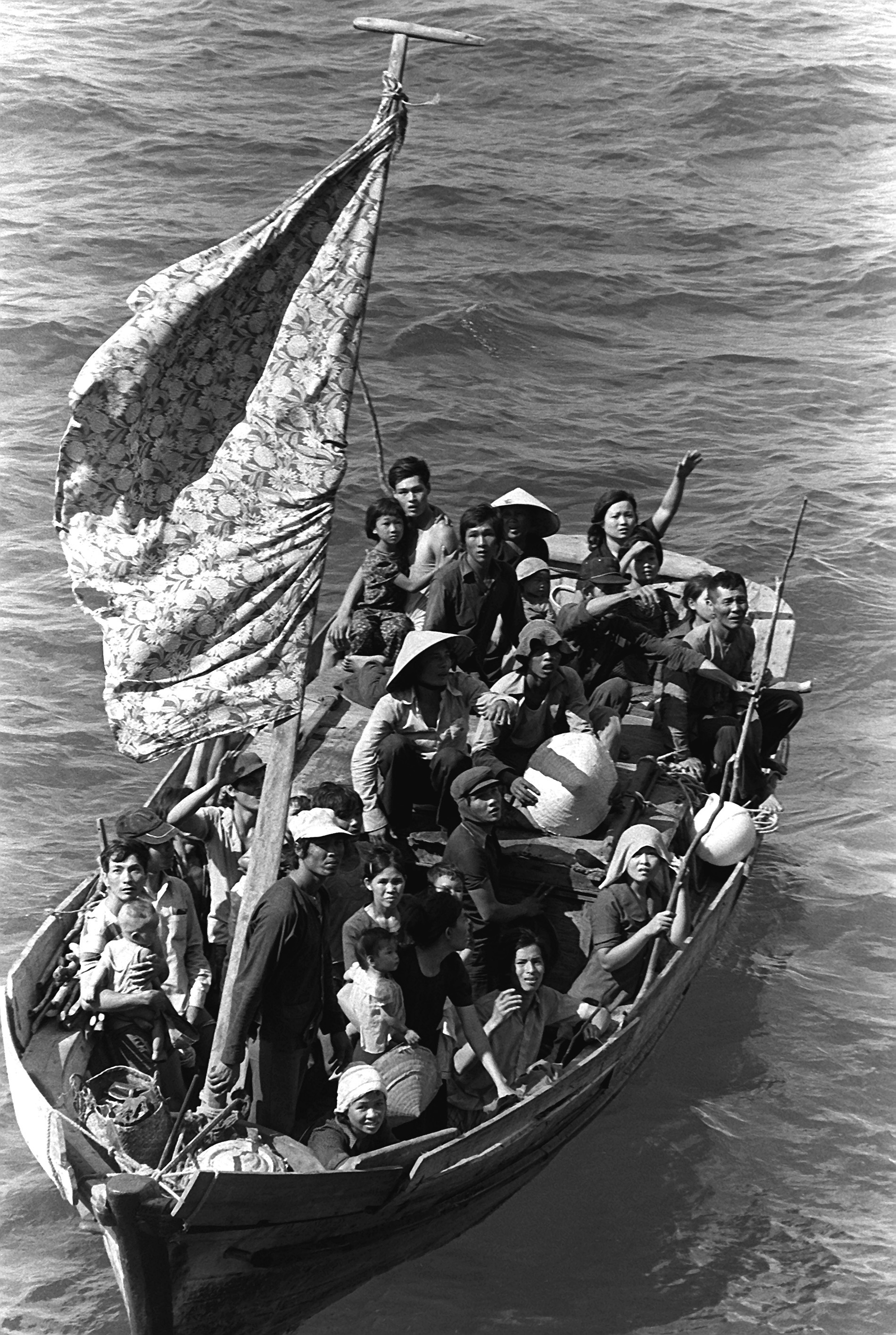
An illustration depicting Vietnamese refugees and boats adrift at sea

The Penghu Refugee Camp (Chinese: 澎湖難民營; pinyin: Pénghú Nànmínyíng) accommodated Vietnamese boat refugees in Taiwan from 1977 to 1988. There were two camps in Penghu County, both originally military sites. One was located in Chuwan Village, Siyu Township, and operated from 1977 to 1979. Another camp in Chiangmei Village (or Jiangmei, Chinese:講美, Taiwanese: Káng-bí), Baisha Township, was more representative; it opened on 1 December 1978, and closed on 28 November 1988, operating for a total of 11 years.

== Background ==
In 1975, after the communist regime of North Vietnam unified the entire country, the capital of South Vietnam, Saigon, was renamed Ho Chi Minh City, prompting a mass exodus of ethnic Chinese who had been living in the South. Beginning in 1977, relations between China and Vietnam deteriorated, and in 1979 China (PRC) invaded Vietnam, triggering the Sino-Vietnamese War. This led to an anti-Chinese campaign in northern Vietnam, forcing many ethnic Chinese there to flee. Among the refugees were also ethnic Chinese from Laos and Cambodia. This wave of displacement became known as the Indochinese refugee crisis. Most of these Vietnamese Chinese refugees fled to Mainland China, Hong Kong, Taiwan, Malaysia, Singapore, the Philippines, and Indonesia.

As the United States had been involved in the Vietnam War, it bore a necessary obligation to assist in the resettlement of refugees after the conflict. In 1977, Taiwan, also referred to as the Free Area of the Republic of China, was still one of the United States' diplomatic allies. During the period when United Nations officials were reviewing refugee applications for resettlement abroad (with the primary permanent resettlement destinations being the United States, Canada, and Australia), Taiwan (Free China) served as a temporary refugee reception and accommodation site.

On 1 January 1979, the United States formally established diplomatic relations with the People's Republic of China, severed ties with Free China (Republic of China, as known as Taiwan), and moved to terminate the long-standing Sino-American Mutual Defense Treaty. As the resettlement of Vietnamese refugees had not yet been completed, the United States continued to provide assistance through the Catholic Relief Services, allowing Taiwan and the United States to maintain unofficial, people-to-people exchanges.

== Establishment of Refugee Camps in Taiwan ==
Administrative divisions of Penghu County, Taiwan

Taiwan's first facility to receive Vietnamese boat people, the "Kaohsiung Reception Center (高雄九曲堂接待所)", primarily took in the first wave of refugees who fled South Vietnam before the fall of Saigon to the Viet Cong in April 1975. According to the 1990 publication "Assisting Refugees from the Indochinese Peninsula 《救助中南半島難民》", this group totaled approximately 3,939 people. Many of these refugees later established communities across Taiwan and settled there permanently.

== Refugee Camps in Penghu ==
The Penghu Refugee Camp was administered by the Penghu Defense Command.

=== Siyu Chuwan Camp ===
The first refugee camp in Penghu was established in 1977 at Chuwan (pinyin: Zhuwan, Chinese: 竹篙灣, Taiwanese: Tik-ko-uan), Siyu Township, using a borrowed ROC Army base as the "Temporary Reception Center for Vietnamese Refugees". The Chuwan center closed around 1979, having operated for only a short period, and was therefore not widely known.

=== Baisha Chiangmei Camp ===
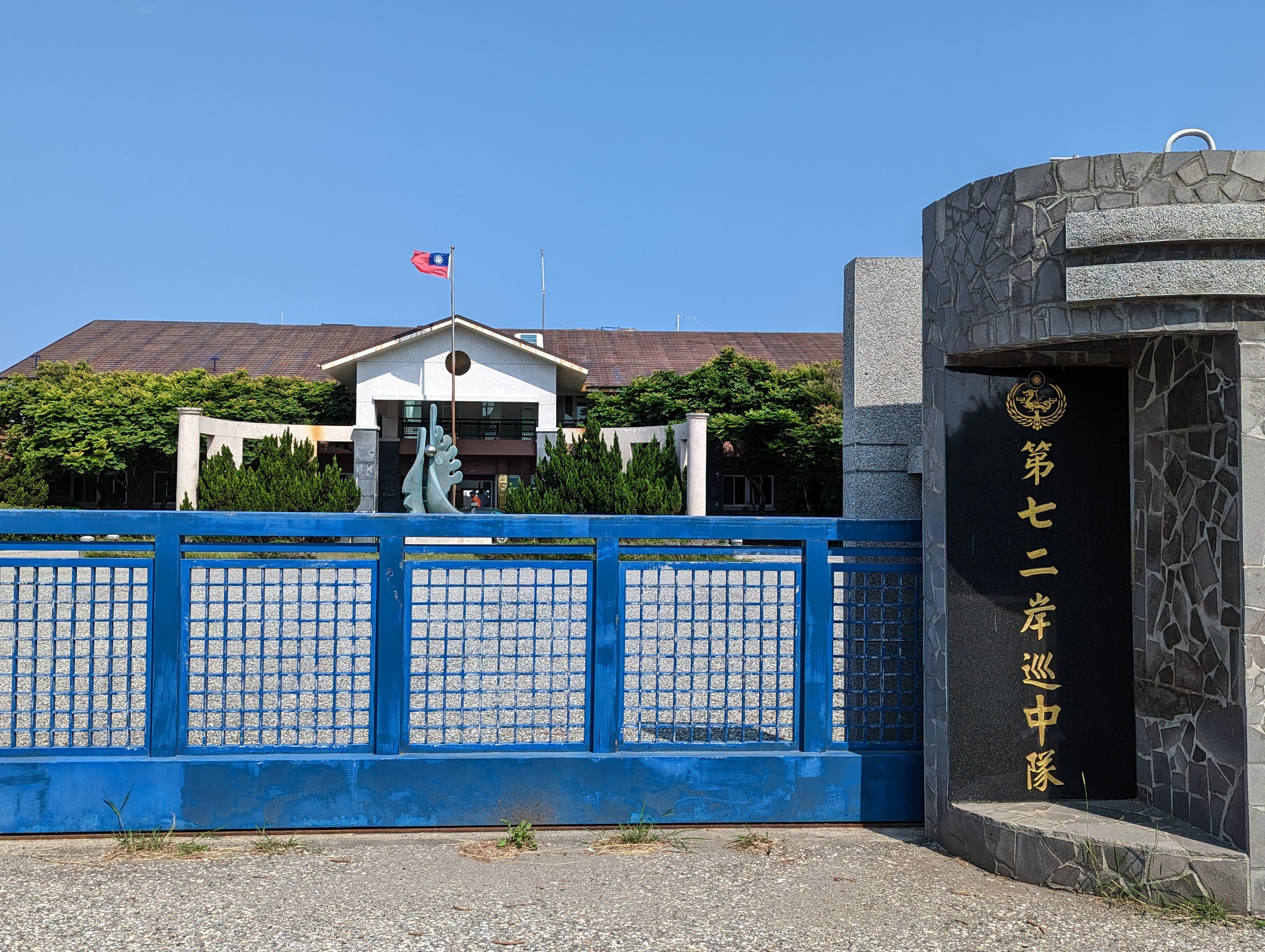
The former site of the Baisha Chiangmei Refugee Camp in Penghu. It is now occupied by the headquarters of the Coast Patrol Corps 7-2, Kinmen–Matsu–Penghu Branch of the Coast Guard Administration, Ocean Affairs Council. The address: No. 141-2, Chiangmei Village, Baisha Township, Penghu County, Taiwan.

Chiangmei Camp (also spelt as Jiangmei via pinyin, Chinese:講美, Taiwanese: Káng-bí), this refugee camp was also converted from former military barracks, and its formal name was the "Chinese Association for Relief and Ensuing Services (CARES)". As the number of refugees housed in Siyu gradually increased, the Siyu facility became insufficient.

On 1 December 1978, a refugee camp in Chiangmei Village, Baisha Township, officially began operation, primarily accommodating Vietnamese refugees under the "Boat People Project". On 15 November 1988, the Chiangmei Village camp was closed, having operated for a total of 11 years. Over that period, it received 45 groups comprising 2,098 people. The refugees were broadly categorized as "ethnic Chinese from South Vietnam", "ethnic Chinese from North Vietnam", and "Vietnamese (Kinh people)", with most of the ethnic Chinese refugees originating from Guangdong Province. Approximately 100 children were born at the camp.

The camp was located at No. 141-2, Chiangmei Village, Baisha Township, Penghu County, near Chiangmei Elementary School. It is said that a few "anti-communist volunteers" who had escaped from Mainland China also stayed there. The remains of the refugee camp were completely demolished in April 2003.

==== Military Announcement ====
On 10 March 2003, shortly before the demolition of the Chiangmei Camp, journalist Asio Liu Chihsiung (劉吉雄), Liu Yu-ching (劉禹慶), and Chuang Hui-hui (莊惠惠) discovered a military notice titled "History of the Refugee Camp" inside the base. The contents are quoted as follows:

民國六十六年六月十六日，首兩批越南難民先後漂流至台東小琉球海域。其時尚無適當機構處理，救總即於澎湖縣西嶼鄉繼光營區設立「越南難民臨時接待所」，即為「接待中心」之前身。嗣後漂流獲救難民日多，業務亦趨繁複，政府乃於六十七年十二月一日委託救總成立「中國大陸災胞救濟總會中南半島難民接待中心」借用白沙鄉軍營，做為難民營舍，擴大收容。本中心恪遵谷理事長「妥善照顧難民」德意，在澎防部司令官及政戰部主任督導支援之下，釐定全般作業程序及計劃，各項業務遂步入正軌。是乃本中心之沿革。越南淪亡，難民顛沛流離逃亡，正是我們足堪借鏡的教訓，我們必須體認，反共與救國乃是一體之兩面不反共即（？）以救國，要救國首須反共。

— 難民營沿革史

Translation of the following Chinese text:

On 16 June 1977, the first two groups of Vietnamese refugees successively drifted into the waters off Taitung Siaoliuqiu. At the time, there was no suitable organization to handle the matter, so the Chinese Association for Relief and Ensuing Services (CARES) established the "Temporary Reception Center for Vietnamese Refugees" at the Chiguang Military Camp (繼光營區) in Siyu Township, Penghu County — the predecessor of what would later become the "Reception Center". As the number of rescued drifting refugees steadily increased and operations grew more complex, on 1 December 1978, the government entrusted the CARES to establish the "Reception Center for Refugees from the Indochinese Peninsula, Chinese Continental Disaster Relief Association", borrowing a military camp in Baisha Township to serve as a refugee camp and expand capacity.

Upholding Chairman Ku's principle of "providing proper care for refugees", and under the supervision and support of the Commander of the Penghu Defense Command and the Director of its Political Warfare Department, the Center formulated comprehensive operational procedures and plans, allowing all aspects of its work to proceed in an orderly manner. This is the history of the Center.

The fall of Vietnam and the plight of its displaced refugees serve as a lesson from which we must learn. We must recognize that anti-communism and national salvation are two sides of the same coin — without opposing communism, there can be no saving the nation; to save the nation, one must first oppose communism.

Journalist Asio Liu Chihsiung said, the notice contains an error: "Taitung Siaoliuqiu" should in fact read "Pingtung Siaoliuqiu".

== Huỳnh Cẩn Du ==
The Route of the Nationalist's (ROC) Retreat to Taipei (Taiwan) in 1949

Huỳnh Cẩn Du (Chinese:黃謹瑜) was born on 23 March 1921 in Lạng Sơn, Vietnam (North Vietnam). His family originated from Qinzhou, Guangdong Province (now part of Guangxi Province). After the outbreak of the Second Sino-Japanese War, Huỳnh Cẩn Du enrolled in a Republic of China Military Academy and participated in several battles against the Japanese Army. In 1945, after the end of World War II and Japan's surrender, he did not return home but was assigned by the Republic of China's military to serve in Jiangsu Province. However, with the outbreak of the Chinese Civil War and a series of defeats for the ROC forces, Huỳnh Cẩn Du was forced to flee.

He returned to his hometown in Lạng Sơn, which was still under French colonial rule at the time, but with the continuing turmoil of war, his family relocated to South Vietnam. On 7 May 1975, Huỳnh Cẩn Du left Vietnam by boat. After 56 days adrift at sea, he was rescued off the coast of Orchid Island, Taiwan. There were a total of 84 refugees aboard, including Huỳnh Cẩn Du, all of whom were granted entry into Taiwan.

By the way, in 1945, with the end of World War II, Taiwan and the Penghu Islands, formerly part of the Japanese Empire, were placed under the administration of the Nationalist government (Republic of China) in the same year. In 1949, during the Chinese Civil War, the People's Liberation Army defeated the Nationalist government, forcing it to retreat to Taiwan and Penghu. On 1 March 1950, the Nationalist government formally established a new government in Taiwan, the national title remained "Republic of China", designating Taipei as its capital, a status it retains to the present.

After arriving in Taiwan, thanks to his background as a former serviceman in the Republic of China's military and his fluency in Vietnamese, he was appointed as a section chief at the Chinese Association for Relief and Ensuing Services (CARES), serving in the operations of the Penghu Refugee Camp for 11 years, until leaving Penghu in 1990.

== Documentaries ==
- Strangers in a Place of Exception (例外之地：台灣海峽之澎湖越南難民營), directed by Asio Liu Chihsiung (劉吉雄), has a runtime of 65 minutes and was released in 2017.
- A Camp Unknown (彼岸他方), directed by Awei Liu (劉建偉), has a runtime of 55'20" and was released in 2023.
- Strangers and Their Babies (陌生人與他們的小孩), directed by Asio Liu Chihsiung (劉吉雄), has a runtime of 88 minutes and was released in 2025.

== See also ==
- 1987 Lieyu massacre
