= Mudou Island =

Island in Baisha, Penghu, Taiwan

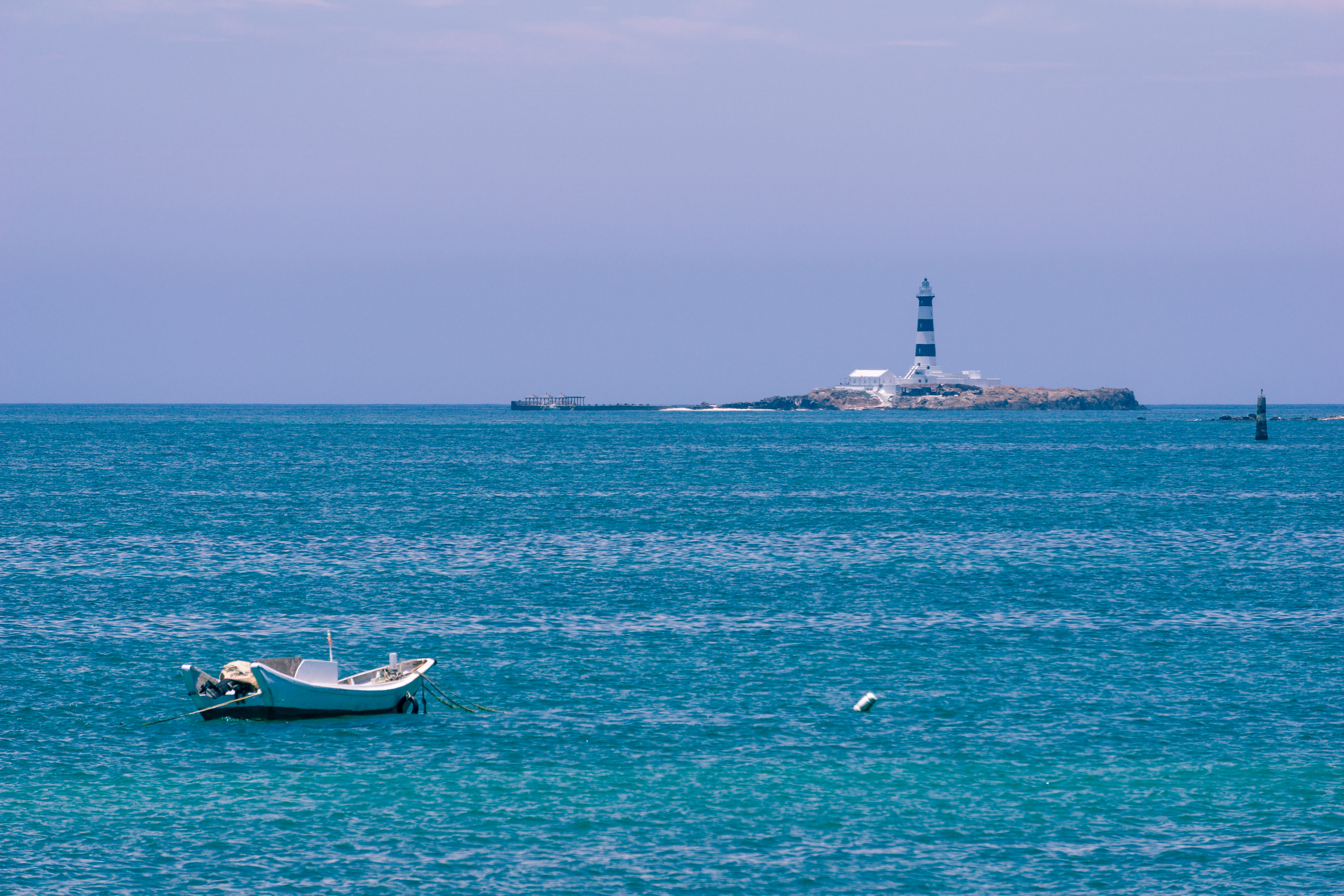

- Location within Taiwan

Geography
- Location: Baisha, Penghu, Taiwan
- Coordinates: 23.786°N 119.600°E

Administration
- Republic of China (Taiwan)

Mudou Island (Chinese: 目斗嶼; pinyin: Mùdǒu Yǔ) is an island in Baisha Township, Penghu County, Taiwan. It is in the Taiwan Strait off the west coast of Taiwan. The island was formed from plateau basalt.

== Name ==
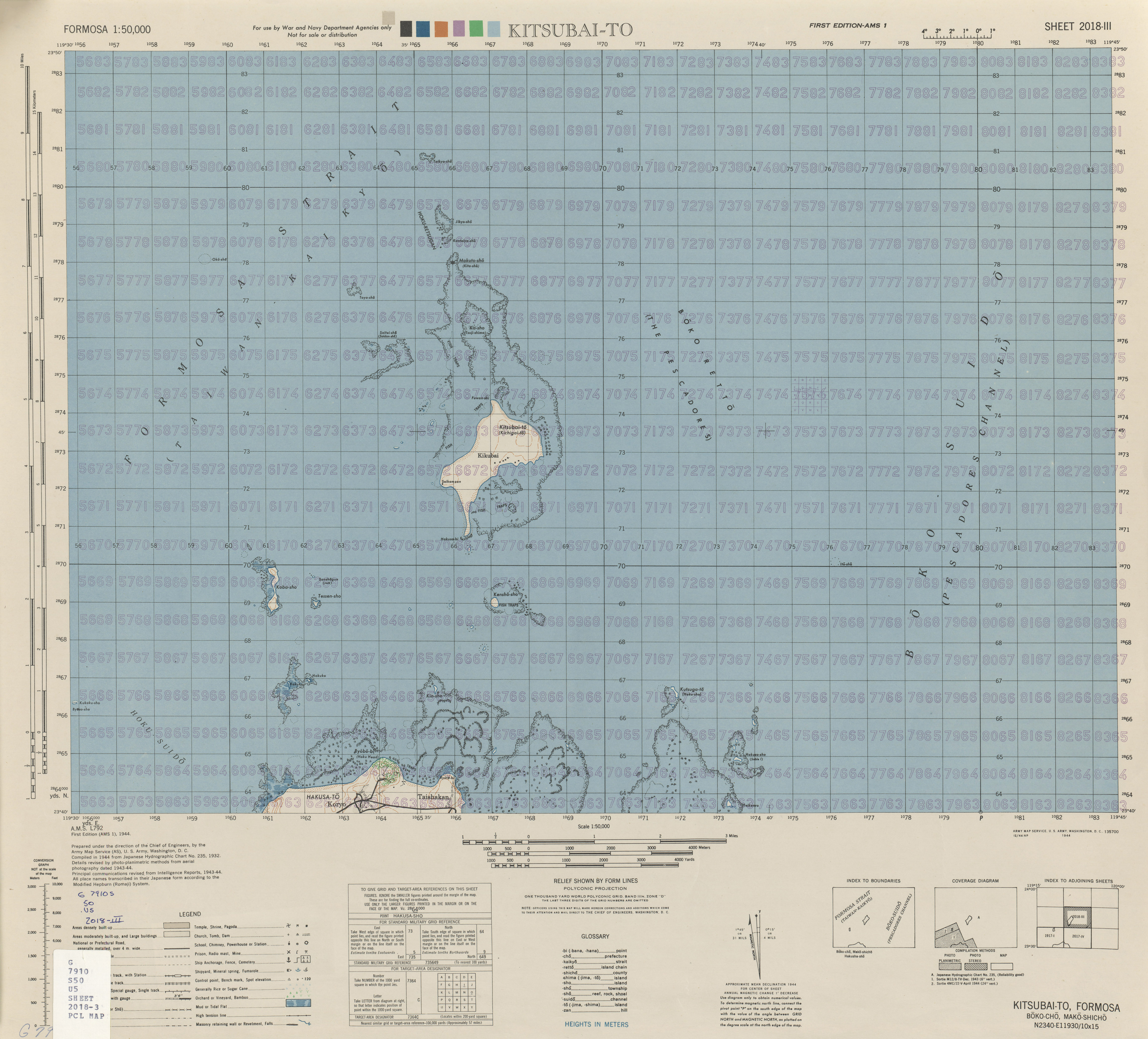
Map including Mudou Island (labeled as Mokuto-shō (Kita-shō)) (1944)

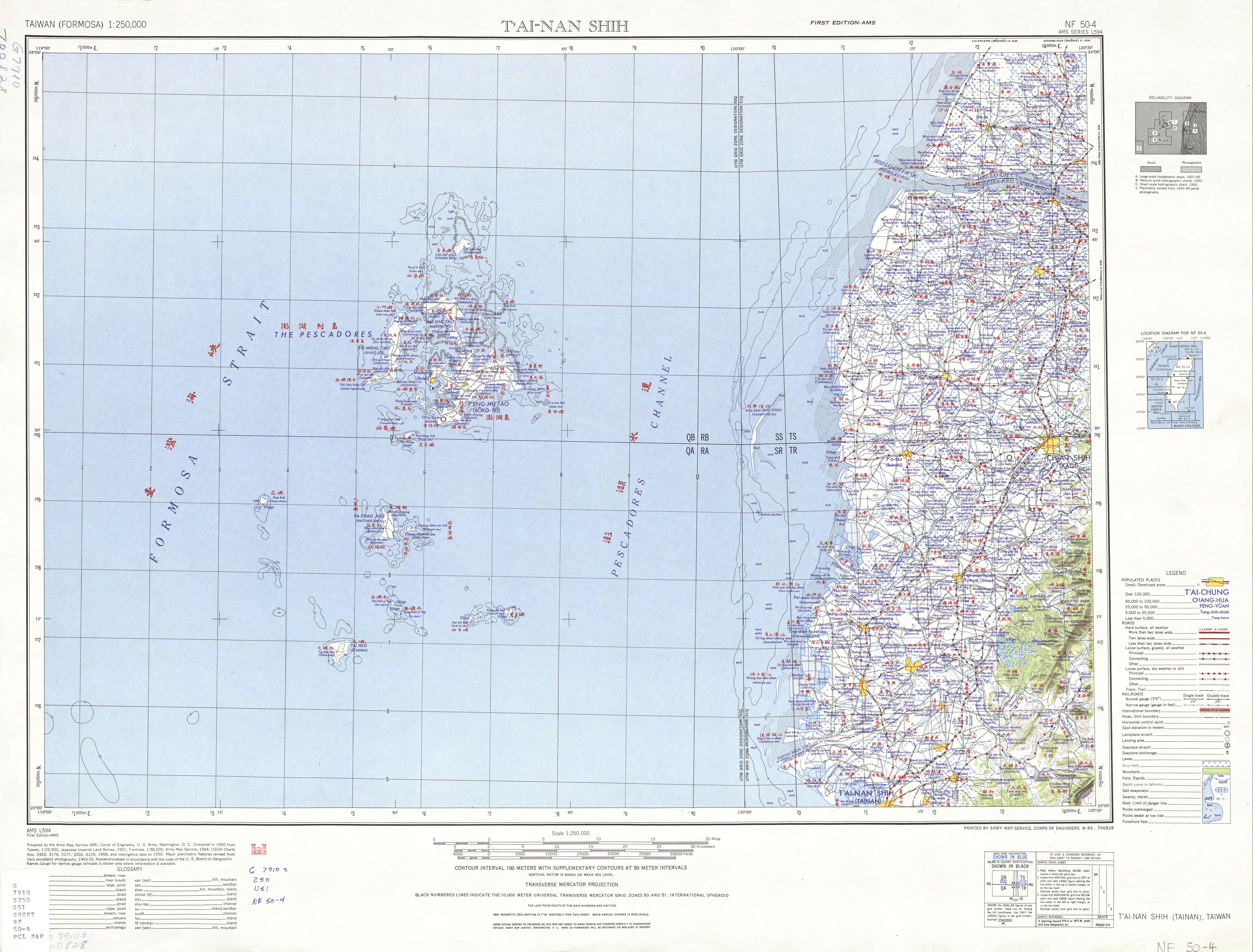
Map including Mudou Island (unlabeled island with 'Light' marking the lighthouse) (1950)

The island was named Ba̍k-táu-sū (墨斗嶼) at first because the shape resembles an ink marker of a carpenter. Japanese colonizer transferred the name from 墨斗 to 目斗, which are pronounced the same in Taiwanese.

== See also ==
- Islands of Taiwan
