= Koba Subeliani =

Georgian politician

Koba Subeliani კობა სუბელიანი

Minister for Internally Displaced Persons from the Occupied Territories, Accommodation and Refugees of Georgia
- In office 29 October 2008 – 4 July 2012
- President: Mikheil Saakashvili
- Preceded by: Giorgi Kheviashvili
- Succeeded by: David Darakhvelidze

Minister of Refugees and Accommodation of Georgia
- In office 22 November 2007 – 6 May 2008

Personal details
- Born: 3 October 1979 (age 46) Sachkhere, Georgia

Koba Subeliani (Georgian: კობა სუბელიანი; born 3 October 1979) is a Georgian politician who served as the Minister for Internally Displaced Persons from the Occupied Territories, Accommodation and Refugees of Georgia from 2008 to 2012.

== Early years ==
Subeliani was born on 3 October 1979 in Sachkhere, Georgia. From 1995 until 1999, he attended Tbilisi Theological Seminary, from 1999 through 2004, he studied at Tbilisi Theological Academy. Starting from 1998, he worked as Assistant Head of Foreign Relations Department of the Patriarchate of the Georgian Orthodox Church. He left the organization in 2004, when he was hired by the Ministry of Defense of Georgia.

== Political career ==
Subeliani served as the Assistant First Deputy Minister of Defense of Georgia until October 2004, when he was appointed Executive Director of the Samegrelo-Zemo Svaneti Governor's Foundation. In May 2005, he was appointed Head of Maintenance and Logistics Services of the Administration of the President of Georgia, a post he held until August 2005. He then worked as the Head of Communal and Public Utility Services of Tbilisi. In November 2007, he was appointed Minister of Refugees and Accommodation of Georgia but left his post in April 2008 to become a member of the Georgian Parliament, where he served until 29 October 2008 when he was re-appointed to the post of the Minister of Refugees and Accommodation of Georgia. In summer of 2010, the ministry was officially renamed to Ministry of Internally Displaced Persons from the Occupied Territories, Accommodation and Refugees. Jondi Bagaturiya of the opposition party Kartuli Dasi had pledged to achieve impeachment of the minister on grounds of appropriation of government funds. The impeachment proposal was put forth in the Georgian Parliament, where on 25 March 2011, 70 out of 81 voted against the motion, leaving Subeliani in his post.

Subeliani is married and, has a son and a daughter.

== See also ==
- List of Georgians
- Cabinet of Georgia
