= Koba (surname) =

Koba (written: 木庭, 木場 or 古葉) is a Japanese surname. Notable people with the surname include:

- Kentaro Koba (木庭 健太郎, born 1952), Japanese politician
- Ryohei Koba (木場 良平, born 1962), Japanese sport shooter
- Takeshi Koba (古葉 竹識), Japanese baseball player and manager
