= Yuanbei Island =

Island in Baisha, Taiwan

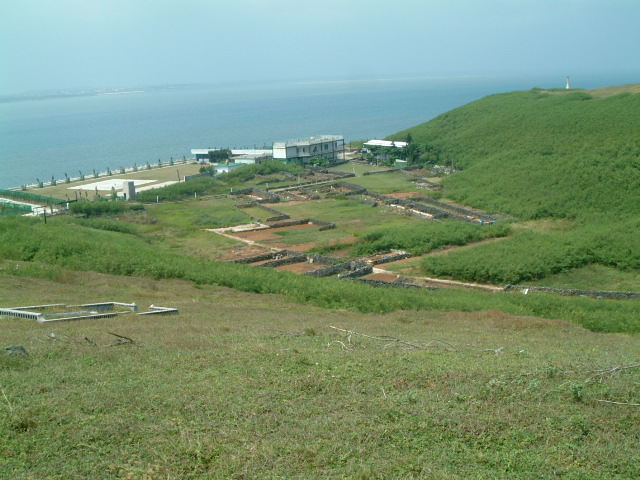

- Location within Taiwan

Geography
- Location: Baisha, Penghu, Taiwan
- Coordinates: 23.648°N 119.634°E

Yuanbei Island or Yuanbei Islet (Chinese: 員貝嶼; pinyin: Yuánbèi Yǔ), also transliterated as Inkai Island, is an island in Baisha Township, Penghu County (the Pescadores), Taiwan.

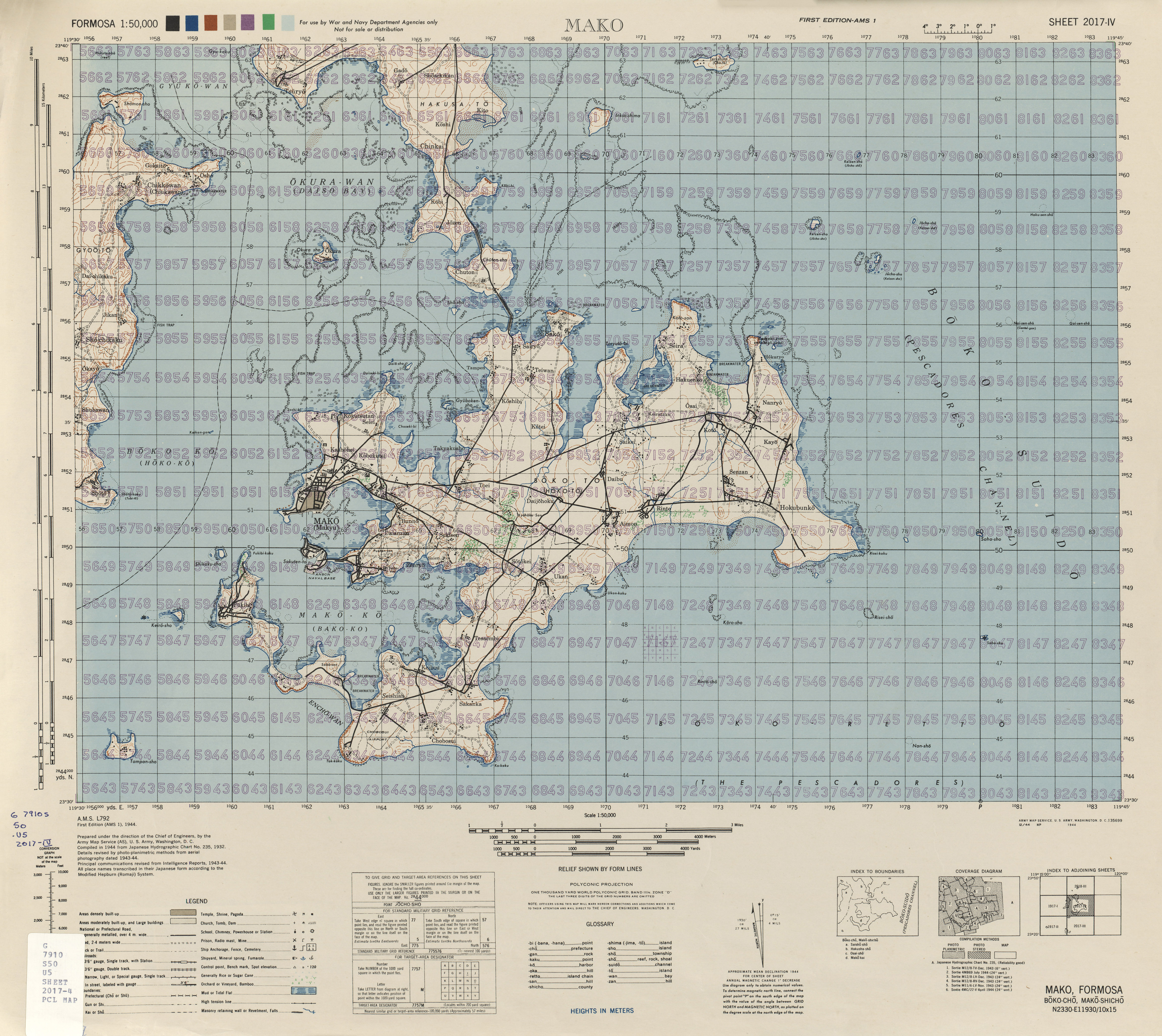
Map including Yuanbei Island (labeled as Inkai-shima) (1944)

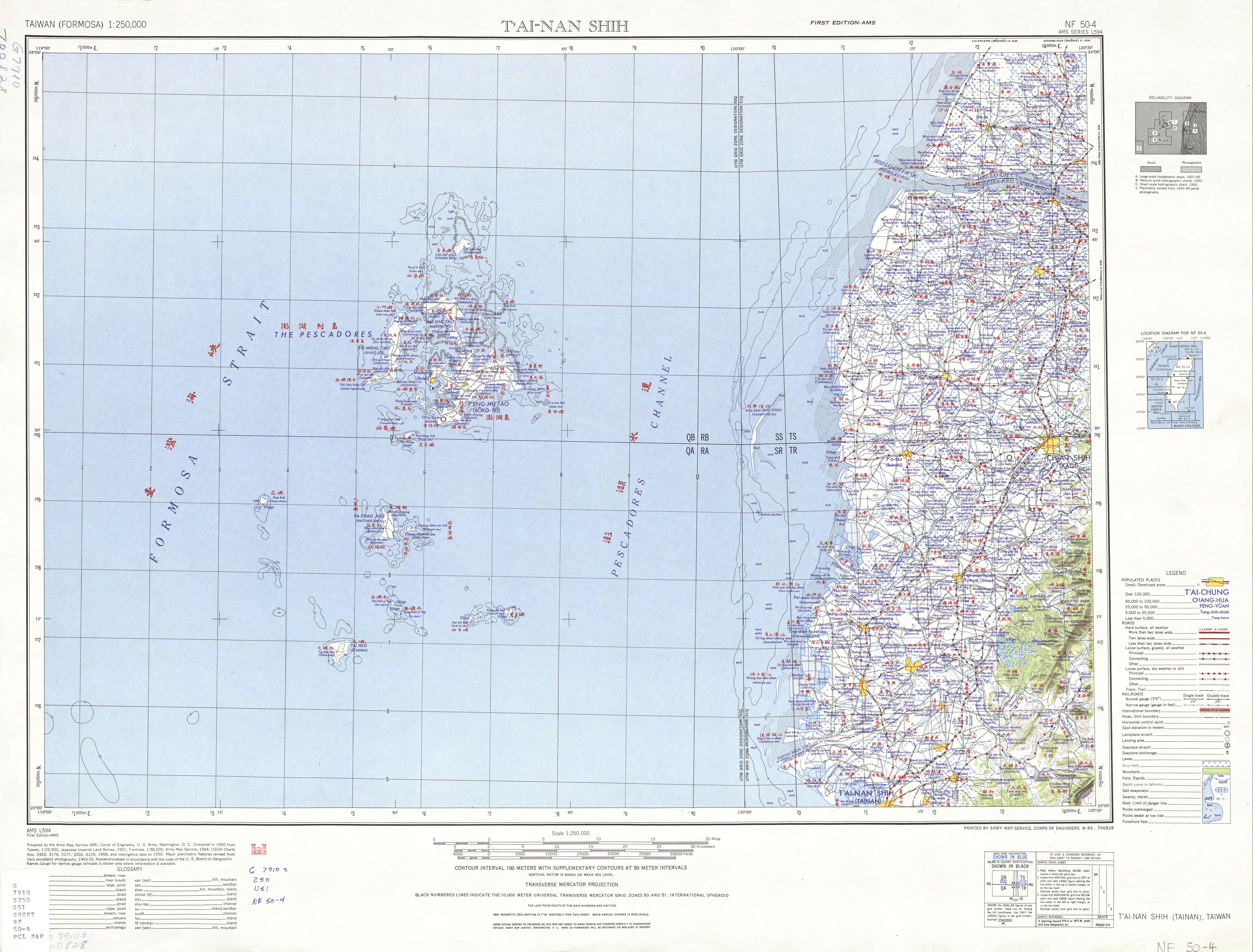
Map including Yuanbei Island (labeled as Yuan-pei hsü (Inkai-shima)) (1950)

== See also ==
- List of islands of Taiwan
