= Jibei Island =

Island in Baisha, Penghu, Taiwan

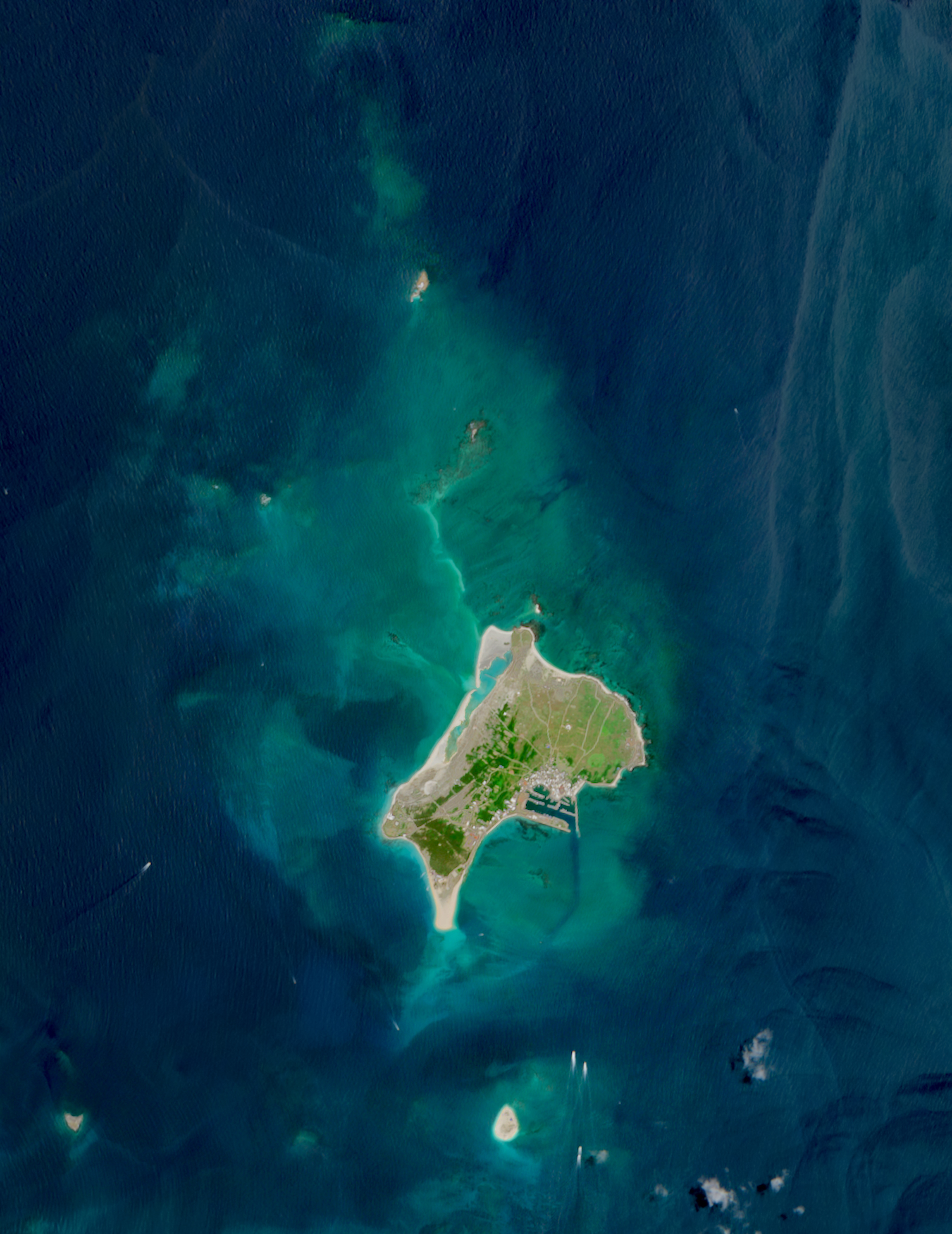

- Location within Taiwan

Geography
- Location: Baisha, Penghu, Taiwan
- Coordinates: 23.745°N 119.600°E
- Area: 3.05 km^{2} (1.18 sq mi)

Jibei Island (Chipei Island; Chinese: 吉貝嶼; pinyin: Jíbèi Yǔ; Wade–Giles: Chi^{2}-pei^{4} Yü^{3}) is an island in Baisha Township, Penghu County, Taiwan.

== Geology ==
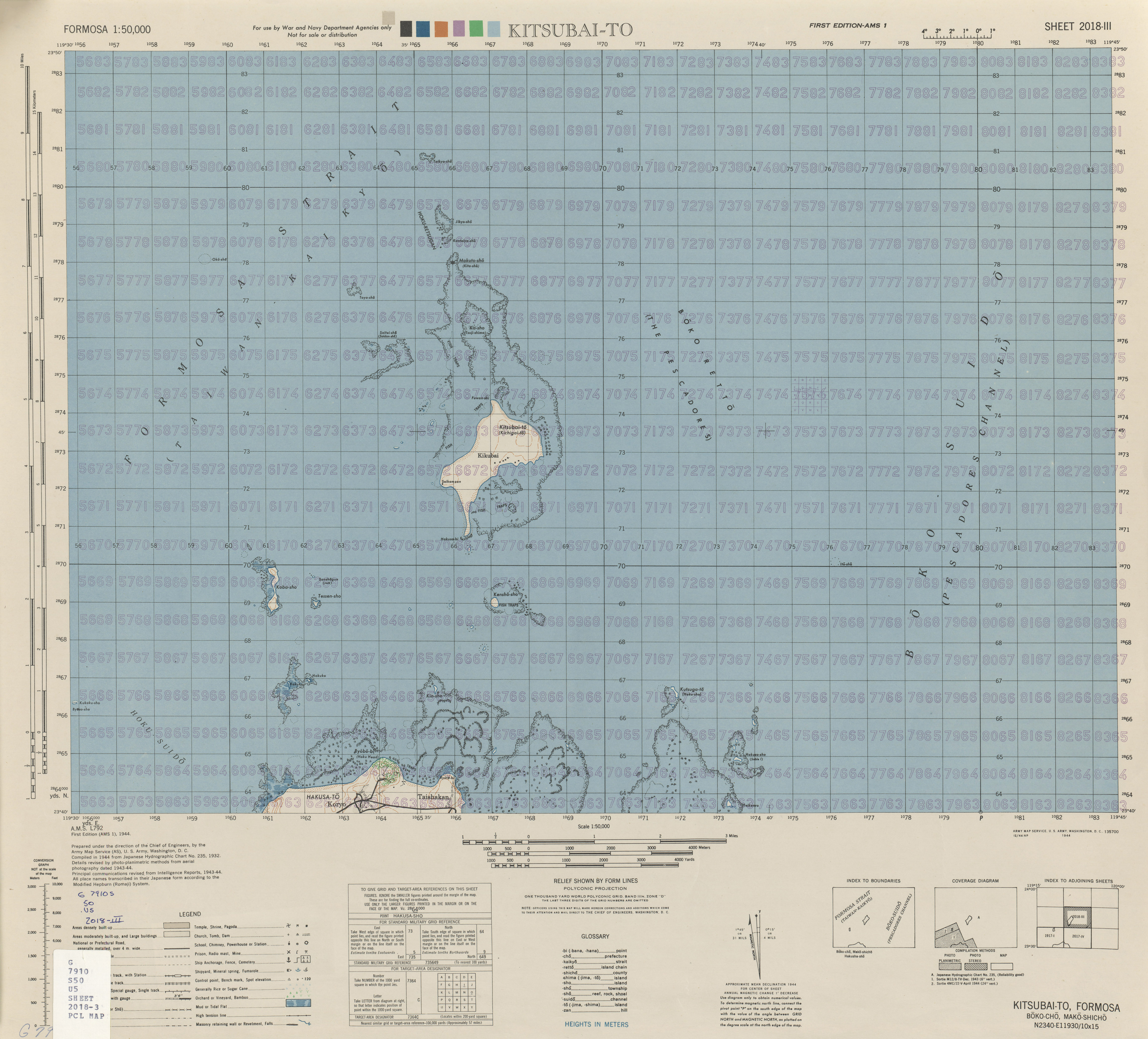
Map of Jibei Island (labeled as Kitsubai-tō (Kichigai-tō)) and surrounding area (1944)

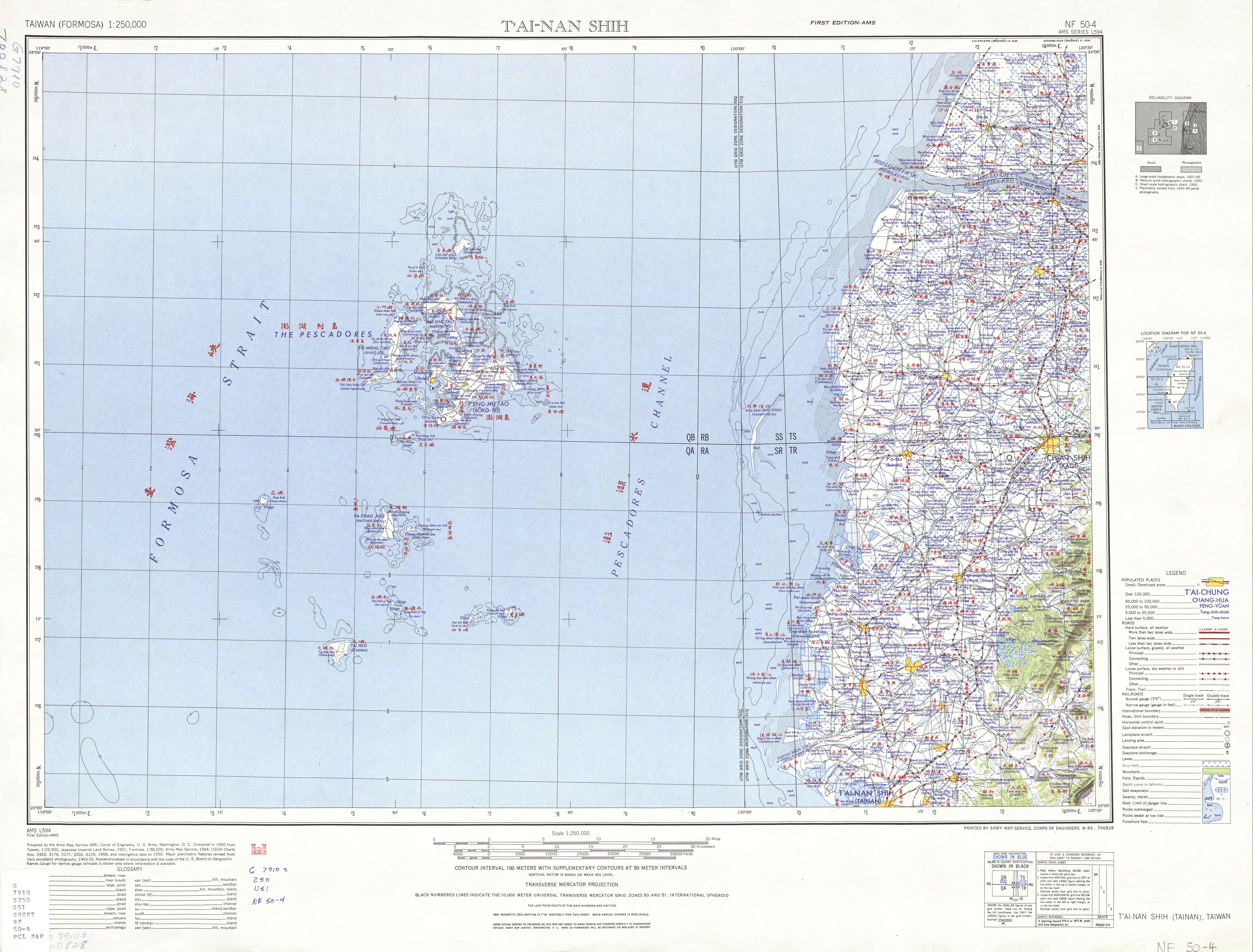
Map including Jibei Island (labeled as CHI-PEI HSÜ (KITSUBAI-SHO) 吉貝嶼) (1950)

The island is located 5.5 km off of Penghu Island with a size of 3.05 km^{2}.

== Transportation ==
The island houses the Jibei wharf, with destination to Chikan wharf and Houliao wharf at Baisha island.

== See also ==
- List of islands of Taiwan
