= Gupo Island =

Island in Baisha, Penghu, Taiwan

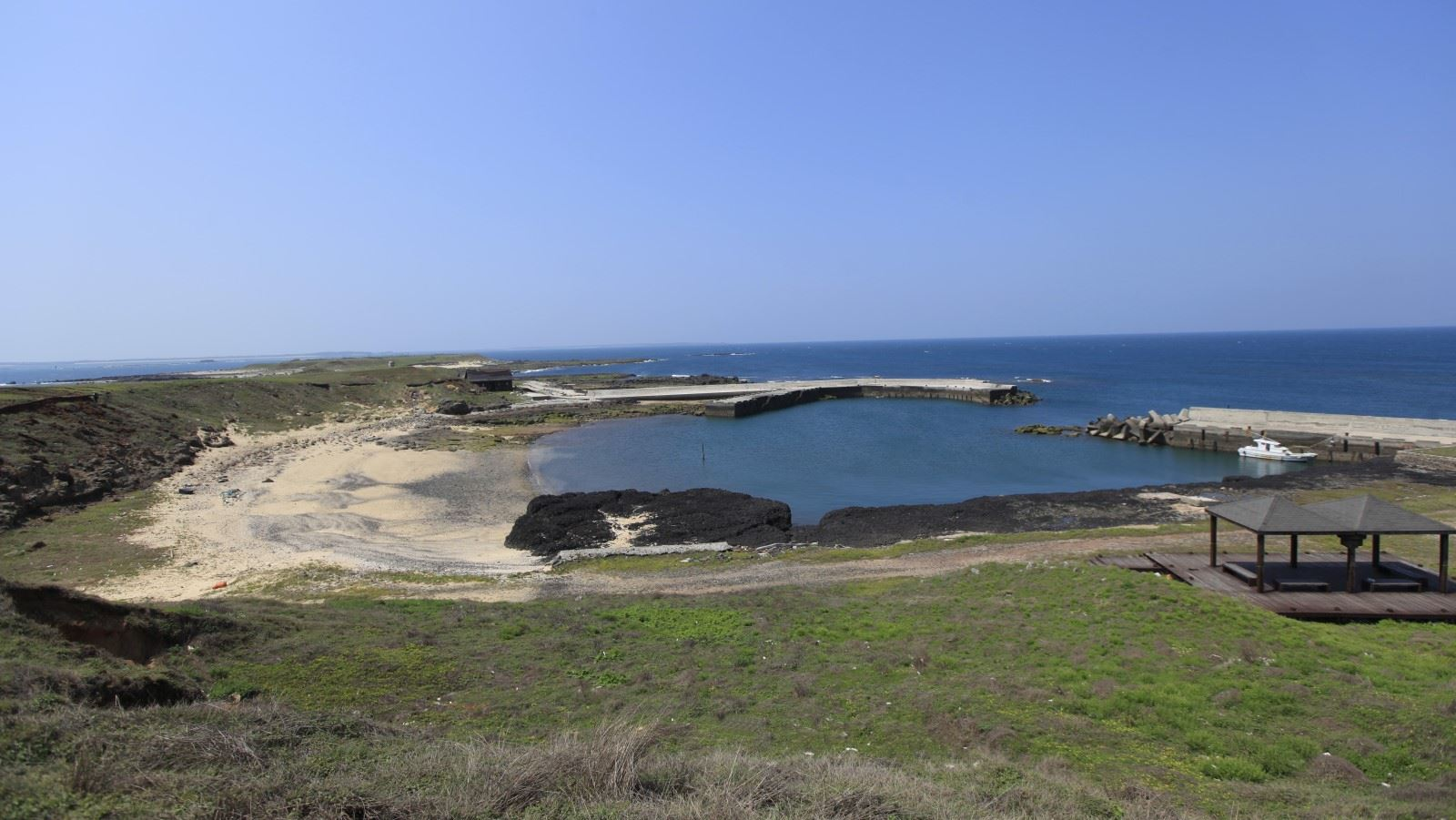

- Location within Taiwan

Geography
- Location: Baisha, Penghu, Taiwan
- Coordinates: 23.715°N 119.556°E

Gupo Island (Chinese: 姑婆嶼; pinyin: Gūpó Yǔ; Pe̍h-ōe-jī: Ko͘-pô-sū), also transliterated as Koba Island, is an island in Baisha Township, Penghu County, Taiwan.

== Demographics ==
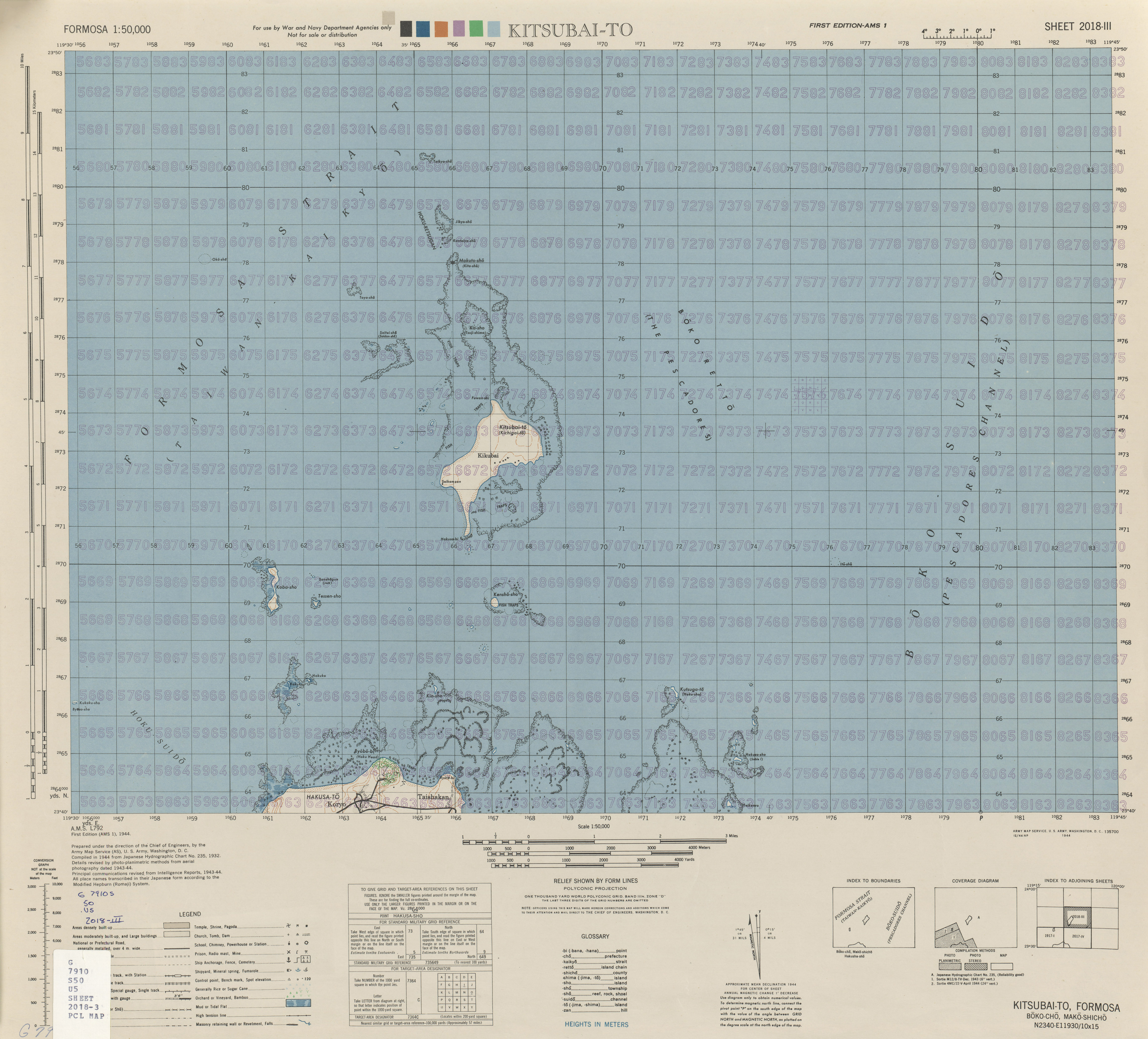
Map including Gupo Island (labeled as Koba-sho) (1944)

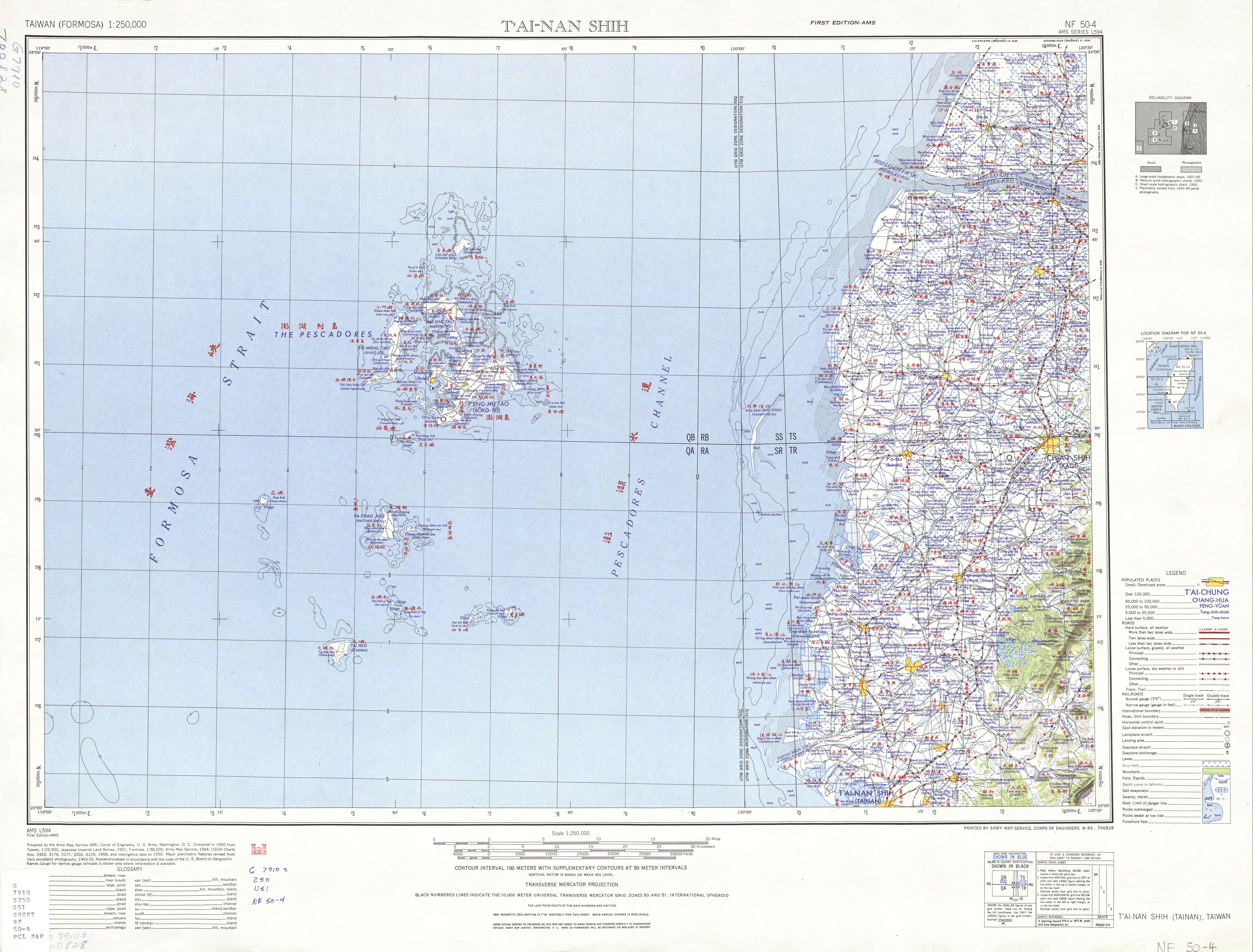
Map including Gupo Island (labeled as Ku-p’o hsü (Koba-sho) 姑婆嶼) (1950)

The island is uninhabitated.

== Economy ==
Nearby residents come to the island for laver harvest in early winter every year.

== See also ==
- List of islands of Taiwan
