= Xianjiao Island =

Island in Baisha, Penghu, Taiwan

- Interactive map of Xianjiao Island

Geography
- Location: Penghu (the Pescadores), Taiwan
- Coordinates: 23.7120°N 119.6081°E

Xianjiao Island (Chinese: 險礁嶼) is an island in Baisha Township, Penghu Islands (the Pescadores) archipelago.

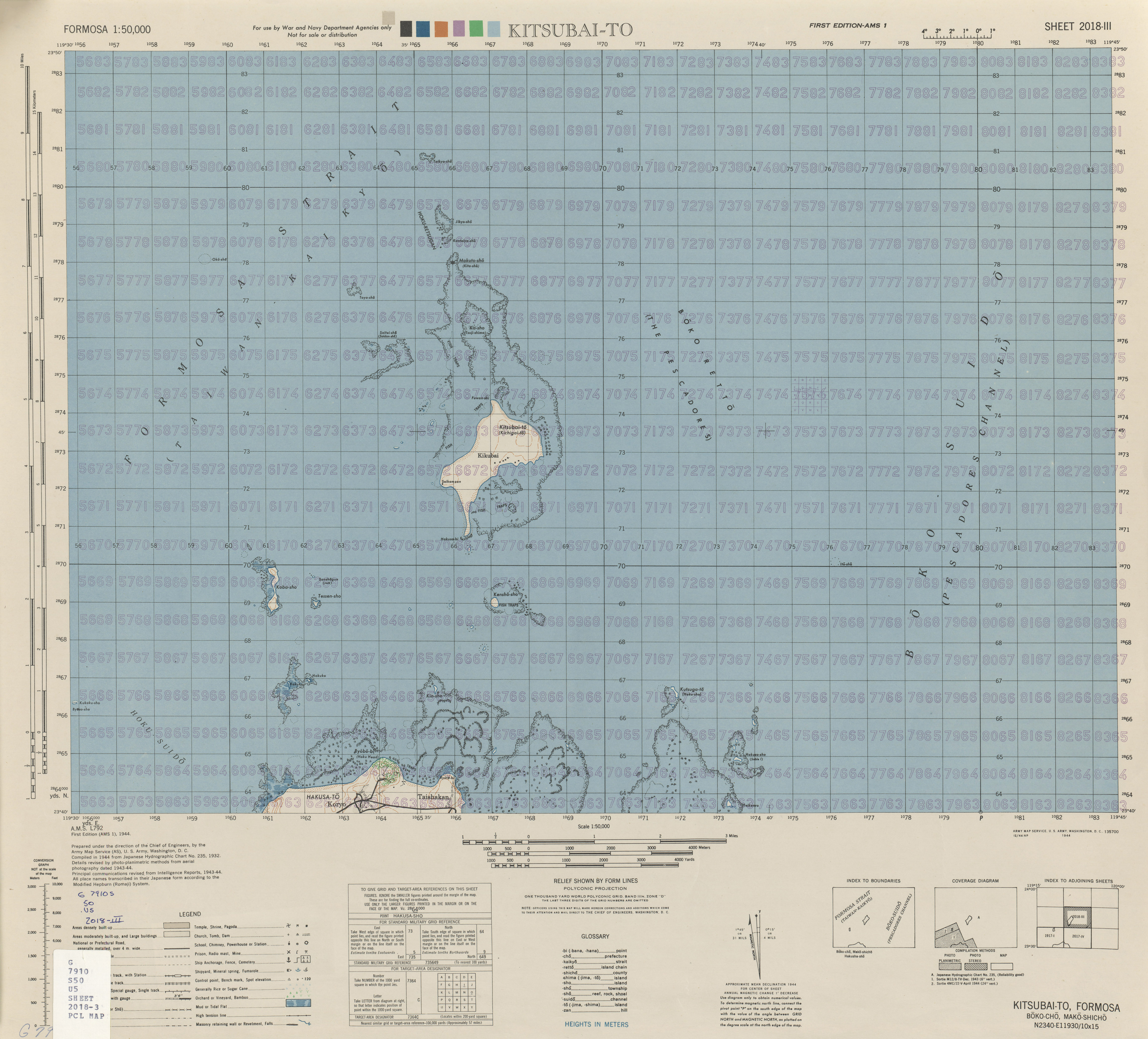
Map including Xianjiao Island (labeled as Kenshō-sho) (1944)

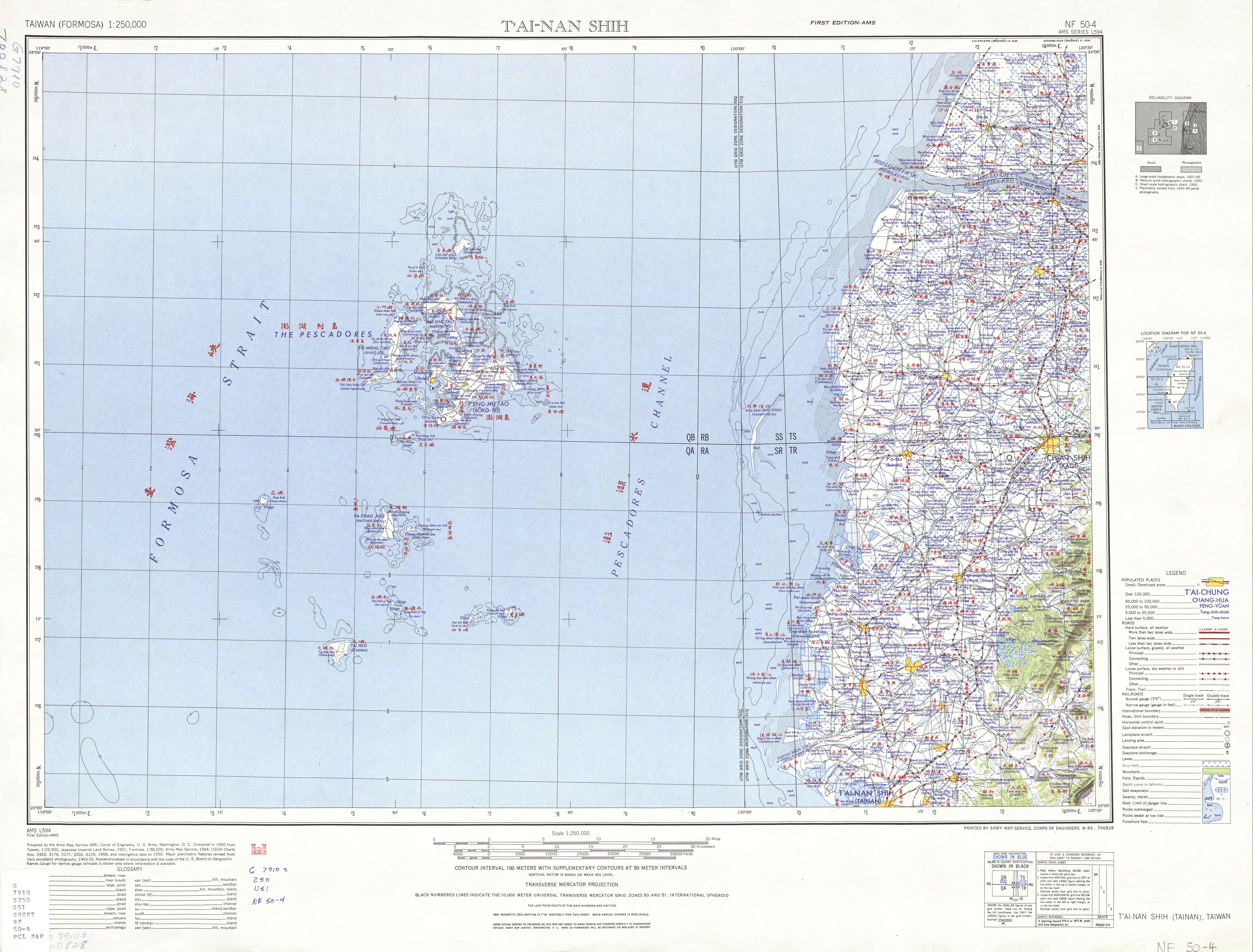
Map including Xianjiao Island (unlabeled island) (1950)

It is in the Taiwan Strait of the South China Sea, off the west coast of Taiwan.

== See also ==
- Islands of Taiwan
