= Baisha Island =

Island in Baisha, Penghu, Taiwan

Coordinates: 23°39′20″N 119°35′40″E

Baisha Island (Chinese: 白沙島), covering an area of 13.8763 square kilometers, is the largest island in Baisha Township of Penghu County, Taiwan. The terrain of the island slopes from the south to gradually flatten in the north. It is separated from the offshore islands of Beihai and connected to Xiyu. The island produces Jiabao melons, Penghu loofahs, and Hami melons, earning it the nickname "the homeland of melons and fruits".

The northern coast of the island is covered with fine sand composed of coral fragments, which have accumulated over a long period to form a large white sandy beach, thus giving it the name Baisha ("white sand") Island. According to the population statistics of Penghu County Civil Affairs Bureau, in April 2024, the island had a population of 10,084.
