= Baisha, Penghu =

Coordinates: 23°39′48.21″N 119°35′32.5″E

Baisha Township 白沙鄉 Pai-sha, Hakusa
- Rural township
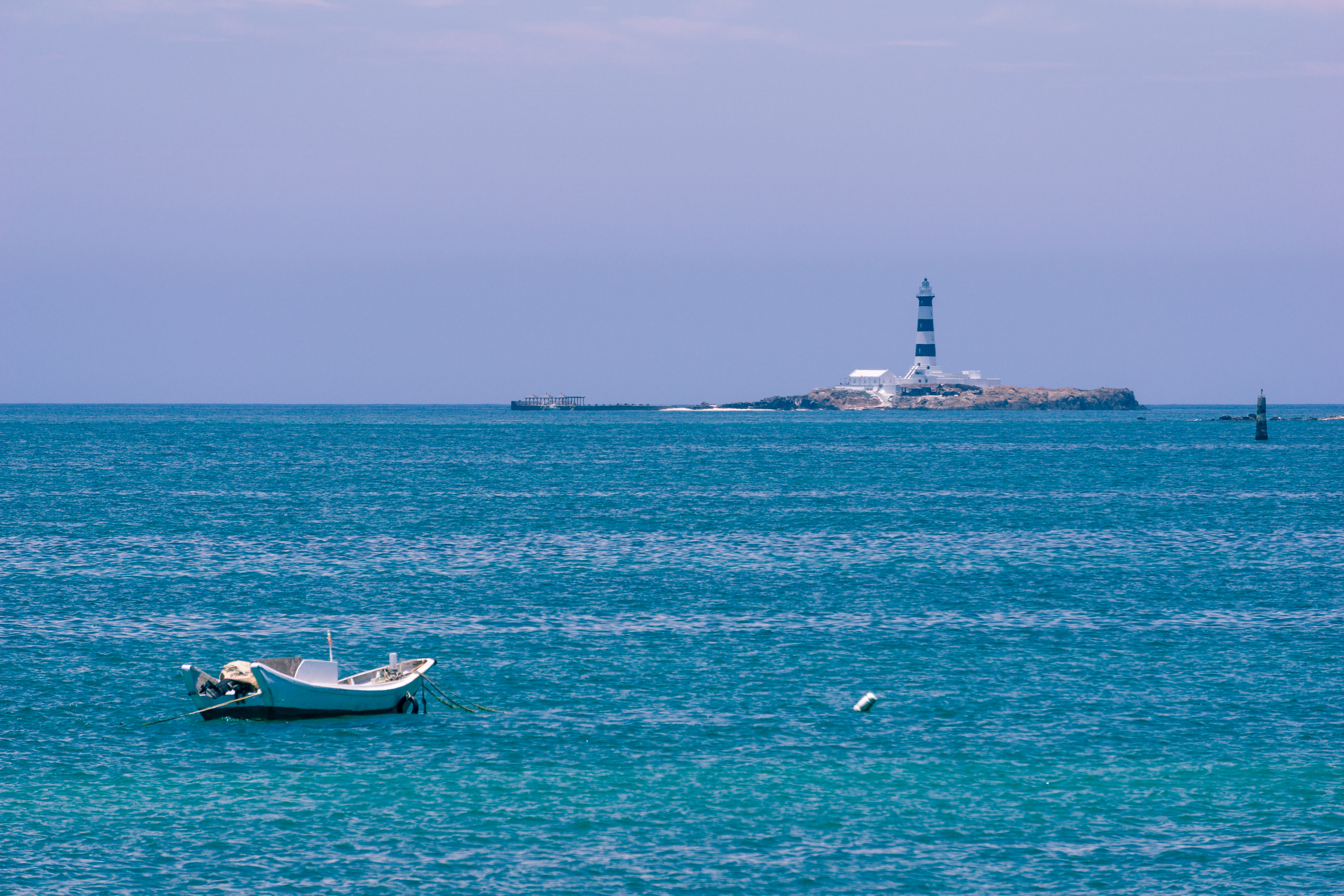
- Lighthouse on Mudou Island in Baisha Township

- Baisha Township in Penghu County
- Country: Republic of China (Taiwan)
- County: (Penghu County) Penghu
- Rural Villages (村): 15

Government
  - Mayor (鄉長): Wan-Fu Song (宋萬富)

Area
  - Total: 20 km^{2} (7.7 sq mi)

Population (February 2023)
  - Total: 10,048
  - Density: 500/km^{2} (1,300/sq mi)
- Time zone: UTC+8 (National Standard Time)
- Postal code: 884
- Website: www.baisha.gov.tw (in Chinese), www.baisha.gov.tw/en (in English)

Baisha Township
- Traditional Chinese: 白沙鄉
- Literal meaning: White sand township
Transcriptions
Standard Mandarin
- Hanyu Pinyin: Báishā Xiāng
- Bopomofo: ㄅㄞˊ ㄕㄚ ㄒㄧㄤ
- Tongyong Pinyin: Bái-sha Xiang
- IPA: [pʰaǐ.ʂá ɕiáŋ]
Southern Min
- Hokkien POJ: Pe̍h-soa-hiong
- Tâi-lô: Pe̍h-sua-hiong

Baisha Township is a rural township in Penghu County, Taiwan. It is located to the north of Penghu Main Island and linked to Siyu Island by the Penghu Trans-Oceanic Bridge, which at 2.5 km (1.6 mi) long is the longest of its kind in east Asia. The township has a population of 10,048.

== Geography ==
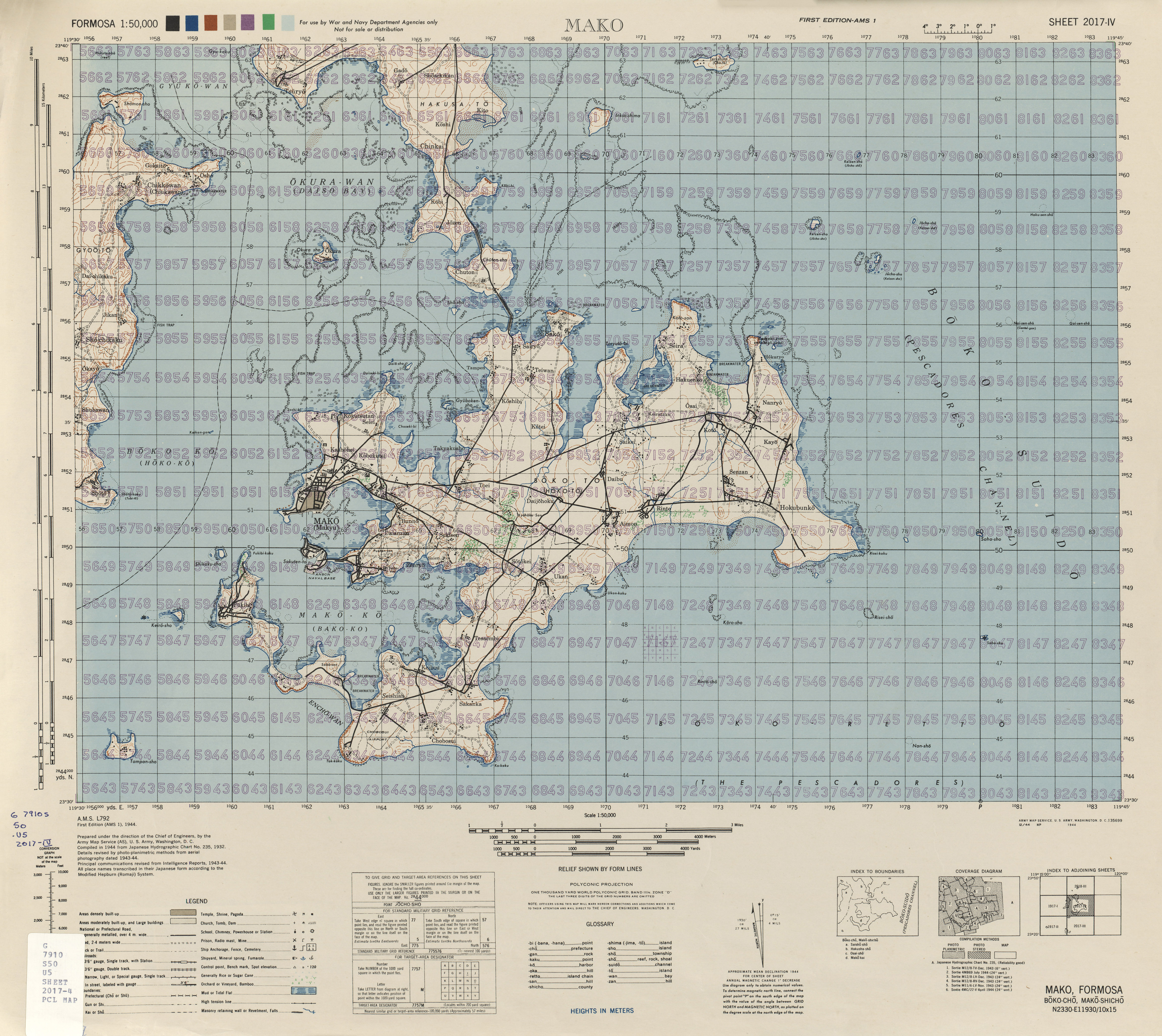
Map of part of Baisha (labeled as HAKUSA-TŌ) (1944)

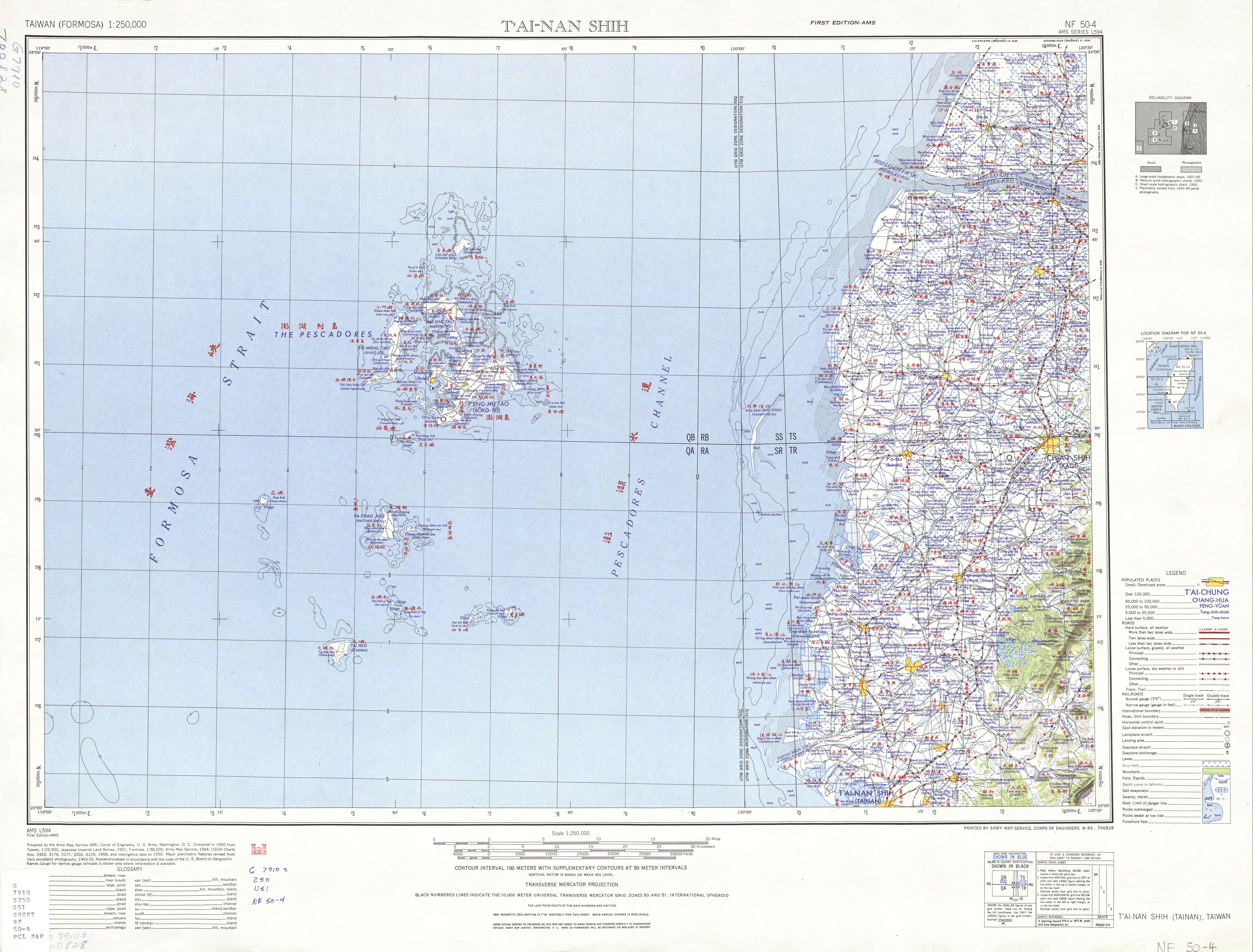
Map including Baisha (labeled as PAI-SHA TAO (HAKUSA-TŌ) 白沙島) (1950)

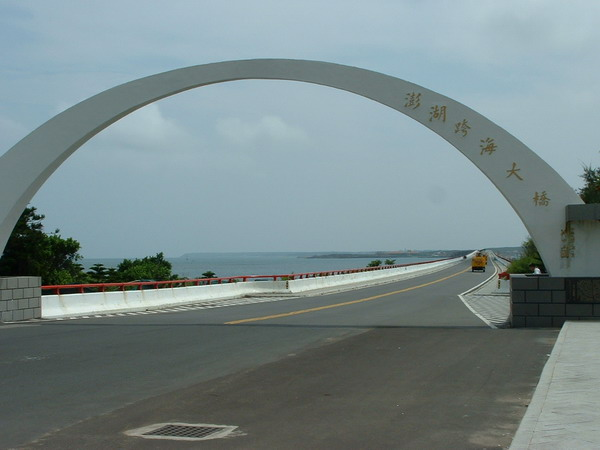
The Penghu Great Bridge

The township is spread over 20 islands, including:

- Baisha Main Island (白沙島; Pe̍h-sua-tó)
- Jibei Island (吉貝嶼; Kiat-puè-sū), former known as Jiabei Island (嘉貝嶼; Ka-puà-sū)
- Bird Island (鳥嶼; Tsiáu-sū), the most densely populated island of Penghu, with 1,226 residents sharing an area of 0.4 km^{2} (0.2 sq mi)
- Chungtun (Zhongtun) Island (中屯嶼; Tiong-tun-sū), former known as Zhongdun Island (中墩嶼)
- Dacang Island (大倉嶼; Tuā-tshng-sū)
- Yuanbei Island (員貝嶼; Înn-puà-sū)
- Mudou Island (目斗嶼; Ba̍k-táu-sū), former known as Modou Island (墨斗嶼)
- Tiejhen (Tiezhen) Island (鐵砧嶼; Thih-tiam-sū)
- Gupo Island (姑婆嶼; Koo-pô-sū)
- Xianjiao Island (險礁嶼; Hiám-ta-sū)

== Administrative divisions ==
The township comprises 15 villages:

- Chengcian/Chengqian (城前村)
- Chihkan/Chikan (赤崁村)
- Dacang (大倉村)
- Gangzih/Gangzi (港子村)
- Houliao (後寮村)
- Jiangmei (講美村)
- Jibei (吉貝村) on Jibei Island
- Niaoyu (鳥嶼村) on Niau Island / Bird Island
- Citou/Qitou (岐頭村)
- Tongliang (通梁村)
- Watong (瓦硐村)
- Siaochih/Xiaochi (小赤村)
- Yuanbei (員貝村) on Yuanbei Island
- Jhenhai/Zhenhai (鎮海村)
- Jhongtun/Zhongtun (中屯村) on Zhongtun Island

== Transportation ==
- Chikan Wharf
- Houliao Wharf
- Jibei Wharf

== Notable natives ==
- Chuang Chu Yu-nu, philanthropist

== See also ==
- Penghu Refugee Camp
