= Chen Chia-hsun desertion case =

The Chen Chia-hsun case, also known as the Erdan Island desertion incident, was a disappearance incident involving Republic of China Army Private First Class Chen Chia-hsun on Erdan Island in Kinmen County. On 9 March 2023, Chen, who was assigned to the Erdan Garrison of the Erdan Defense Company under the Lieyu Garrison Battalion of the Kinmen Defense Command, went missing. It was later learned that he had been rescued by the China Coast Guard and taken to Xiamen, where he was accommodated by Chinese authorities.On 17 March, the Kinmen branch of the Fujian District Prosecutors Office issued a wanted notice for Chen.

== Background ==
=== Erdan Island ===
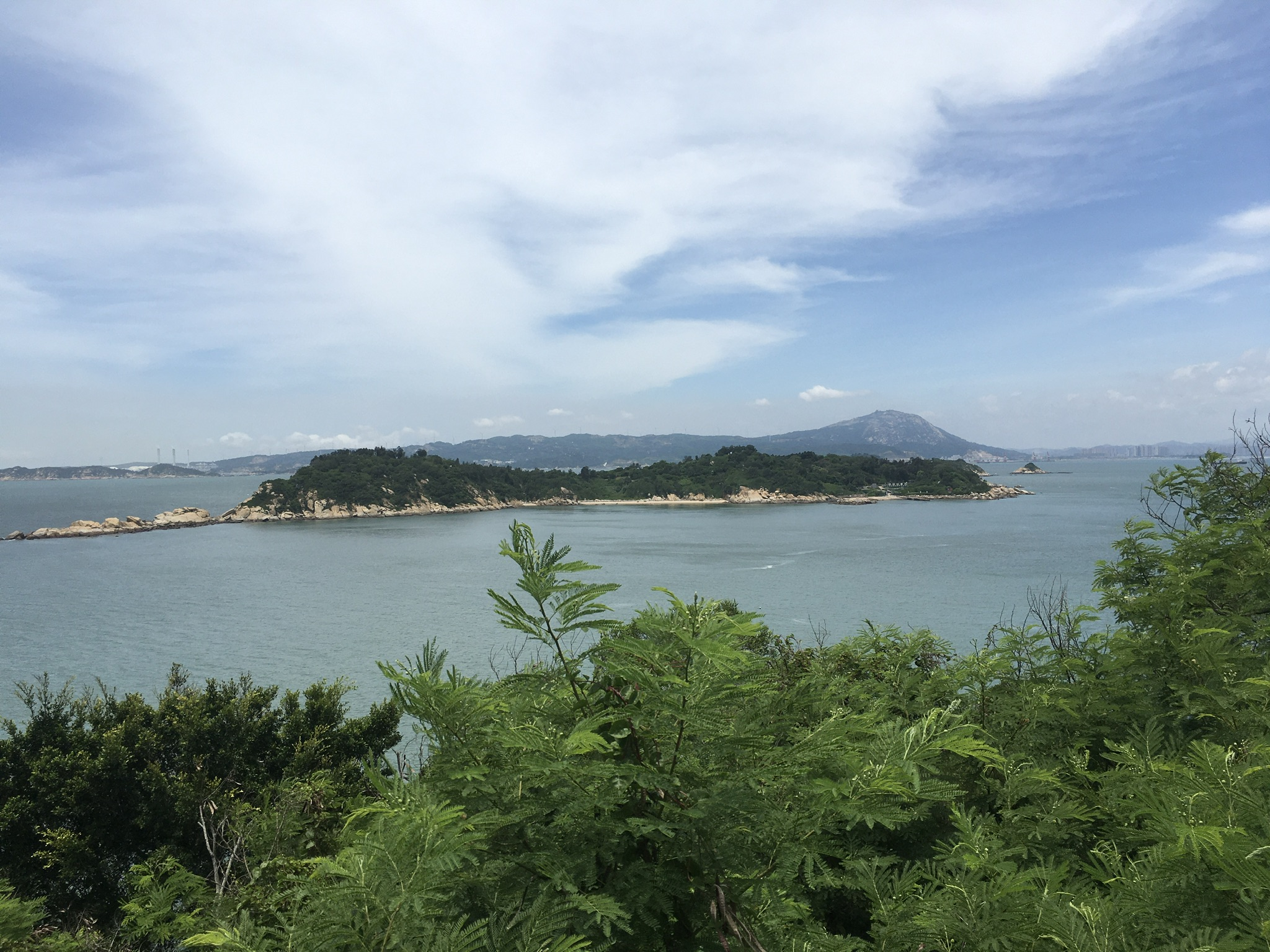
Erdan Island, viewed from Dadan Island; the island is garrisoned by dozens of troops.

Erdan Island is administered by Lieyu Township, Kinmen County, Fujian Province of the Republic of China (Taiwan). It is one of the offshore islands under the control of the Republic of China and lies southwest of Lieyu Island. Together with nearby Dadan Island, located about 800 meters away, it has been described as “the frontline of the frontline” and “an offshore island among offshore islands.” The island is located approximately seven nautical miles from Xiamen and hosts a company-level military garrison.

=== Swimming Across the Strait and Subsequent Handling ===
A major ebb tide began around Erdan Island at 07:28 on 9 March 2023. The direction of the outgoing tide happened to lead from Dadan Island toward Xiamen. According to estimates, anyone reaching the beach area between Erdan and Dadan islands could be carried toward Xiamen by the tide without even having to swim.

Military camps in the Kinmen area maintain strict controls over floating objects.

The previous case of a serviceman stationed on an offshore island swimming to the mainland occurred in 1996, 27 years earlier. During that period, there had been more than twenty incidents in which people from mainland China reached offshore islands by swimming or drifting. In the past, vessels operated by the International Red Cross and Red Crescent Movement were used to return such individuals. In recent years, the Coast Guard Administration has transported them to the median line, where they were received by authorities on the other side.

=== Chen Chia-hsun ===
Chen Chia-hsun held a Class B cook certification issued by the Ministry of Labor (Taiwan). He served as a food service specialist (mess hall soldier) in the military.He was a volunteer serviceman and had been scheduled to leave the military in 2024.[13] Before his disappearance, he reportedly told fellow soldiers that he had dreamed that he was in Xiamen that day.

According to Chen's father, Chen had personal debts of more than NT$300,000 incurred outside the military and had been making monthly repayments. However, Chen's friends claimed that he owed between NT$1 million and NT$2 million to illegal moneylenders. Chen's former girlfriend stated that he had financial management problems, including loans used to purchase a heavy motorcycle and excessive spending on mobile game microtransactions.

== Incident Response ==
At 06:50 on 9 March, Staff Sergeant Hsieh, the duty officer, discovered that Chen Chia-hsun was absent from the dining hall and immediately reported the matter to the company commander. At 07:20, the entire unit was organized to search for Chen but failed to locate him. At 08:00, the unit assembled again for a headcount, but Chen was still missing. The incident was then reported through the chain of command, and his family was notified. Chen's father arrived on Erdan Island at 16:20 on the same day. The garrison battalion issued a notice of Chen's unauthorized departure on 10 March, and the Republic of China Military Police initiated an investigation on 11 March in accordance with legal procedures.

The Kinmen Defense Command conducted inspections of weapons, ammunition, life jackets, communications equipment, and information systems, and found no shortages.

On the morning of 9 March, the Twelfth (Kinmen) Patrol Area of the Kinmen-Matsu-Penghu Branch of the Coast Guard Administration received a notification from the Kinmen Defense Command and dispatched patrol vessels to waters near Erdan Island. Search operations were carried out according to search-and-rescue planning systems, while nearby uninhabited islands and shallow reef areas were also searched. The Ninth Shore Patrol Brigade strengthened searches along coastlines under its jurisdiction. Through cross-strait law enforcement and search-and-rescue channels, the Coast Guard Administration requested assistance from mainland authorities and asked the Fisheries Radio Station to broadcast requests for assistance to vessels operating nearby. As of 08:00 on 13 March, a total of 28 vessel deployments, 149 vehicle deployments, and 434 personnel had participated in search-and-rescue operations.

The Mainland Affairs Council learned on 10 March that Chen was in mainland China. On 12 March, it requested that the Straits Exchange Foundation confirm media reports that Chen had been rescued by the China Coast Guard and sought assistance in ensuring his safe return to Taiwan. On 13 March, the Mainland Affairs Council confirmed that Chen was in mainland China, and the Coast Guard Administration suspended its search-and-rescue operations.

== Intelligence Information ==
At 07:30 on 9 March 2023, Chen Chia-hsun was last seen wearing a life jacket. He subsequently left Erdan Island carrying only his mobile phone and wallet. After drifting to the median line of the Taiwan Strait between Sandan Island and Xiamen, he became exhausted and used his phone to call for help. At around 09:30, he was rescued by a vessel dispatched by the China Coast Guard and taken to Xiamen, where he was accommodated at a Coast Guard facility.

Chen reportedly told mainland authorities that he did not wish to return to Taiwan.After being questioned by the Xiamen General Station of Exit and Entry Frontier inspection, the Xiamen Public Security Bureau, and the Xiamen State Security Bureau, mainland authorities concluded that he had no political motives. Due to the sensitivity of the case, it was reported to Beijing for further handling, and mainland authorities later agreed to allow his family to visit him in Xiamen.

== Response ==
=== Judicial Proceedings ===
On 14 March, after Chen Chia-hsun had been absent from his unit for six days, the Kinmen Defense Command transferred the case to the Kinmen Military Police for investigation in accordance with the "Procedures for Handling Wanted Cases Involving Active-Duty Military Personnel Who Desert and Death Investigation Cases".

On the same day, the Kinmen Military Police transferred the results of their investigation to the Kinmen branch of the Fujian District Prosecutors Office.

On 17 March, the Kinmen District Prosecutors Office formally issued a wanted notice for Chen on suspicion of violating Articles 39 and 40 of the Criminal Code of the Armed Forces for "intent to permanently evade military service" and "failing to return after six days of leave", with a statute of limitations of twenty years. Prosecutors ruled out emotional issues, improper discipline, and suicide, and concluded that multiple pieces of evidence indicated that Chen's departure from his unit was related to financial problems.

On 18 March, the Ministry of Justice Investigation Bureau searched Chen's residence. The bureau emphasized that the Kinmen Military Police were leading the investigation under the direction of prosecutors from the Kinmen District Prosecutors Office, while the Fujian Field Office assisted in searching his registered residence.

On 21 March, the Kinmen District Prosecutors Office requested assistance from the Department of International and Cross-Strait Legal Affairs of the Ministry of Justice, asking mainland authorities to return Chen under the Agreement on Joint Crime-Fighting and Mutual Judicial Assistance Across the Taiwan Straits and the Operational Guidelines for the Arrest and Repatriation of Criminal Offenders or Criminal Suspects Across the Taiwan Straits.

=== Military Response ===
On 14 March, the Ministry of National Defense（Taiwan） announced plans to strengthen assessments of personnel stationed on offshore islands, with increased screening regarding finances, relationships, and physical and mental health. Personnel found to have unusual circumstances would be reassigned.

On 15 March, Minister of National Defense (Taiwan) Chiu Kuo-cheng responded to concerns raised in the Legislative Yuan's Foreign Affairs and National Defense Committee regarding possible leaks of military information from Erdan Island. He stated that there was no need to redeploy troops stationed there and remarked that "that era has already passed".

On 27 March, Deputy Minister of National Defense Po Hung-hui Alex stated that the ministry had always disclosed information truthfully and that cognitive warfare efforts had not succeeded. He emphasized that unauthorized absence and desertion in the face of the enemy were absolutely unacceptable and noted that desertion during wartime could be punishable by death.

== Impact ==
Retired Republic of China Army Major General Yu Beichen stated that the Ministry of National Defense should bear full responsibility. He noted that mess hall personnel often had a better understanding of the defense arrangements on Erdan Island than ordinary soldiers, since they needed to know how many troops were stationed at each position, who was on leave, and where adjustments had been made. He added that leaving one's post during military service and heading east would be considered desertion, while heading west would be regarded as defection.

Former Republic of China Air Force Deputy Commander Chang Yen-ting pointed out that the bright color of Chen's life jacket raised questions as to why sentries had failed to notice him entering the water and suggested that there were suspicious circumstances surrounding the incident.

Chen Kuo-ming, chief editor of Defence International Magazine, stated that regardless of Chen's motives, the military careers of officers responsible for the Erdan Garrison, including squad leaders, platoon leaders, company commander (lieutenant colonel), and the commander of the Lieyu Garrison Battalion, would likely be affected. He also suggested that the commander of the Kinmen Defense Command could face disciplinary action for management failures, which could be seen as a form of collective punishment.

Former Democratic Progressive Party legislator Kuo Cheng-liang stated that the incident would cause the international community to question the military management and loyalty of the Republic of China Armed Forces, thereby damaging their image.

Wu Tzu-chia,chairman of the board of Formosa Publishing Co., Ltd， described the incident as an example of cognitive warfare, arguing that it had caused considerable disruption in Taiwan at minimal cost and questioning the effectiveness of anti-China policies.
