= Port of Xiamen =

Coordinates: 24.502262°N 118.084531°E

Port of Xiamen 厦门港
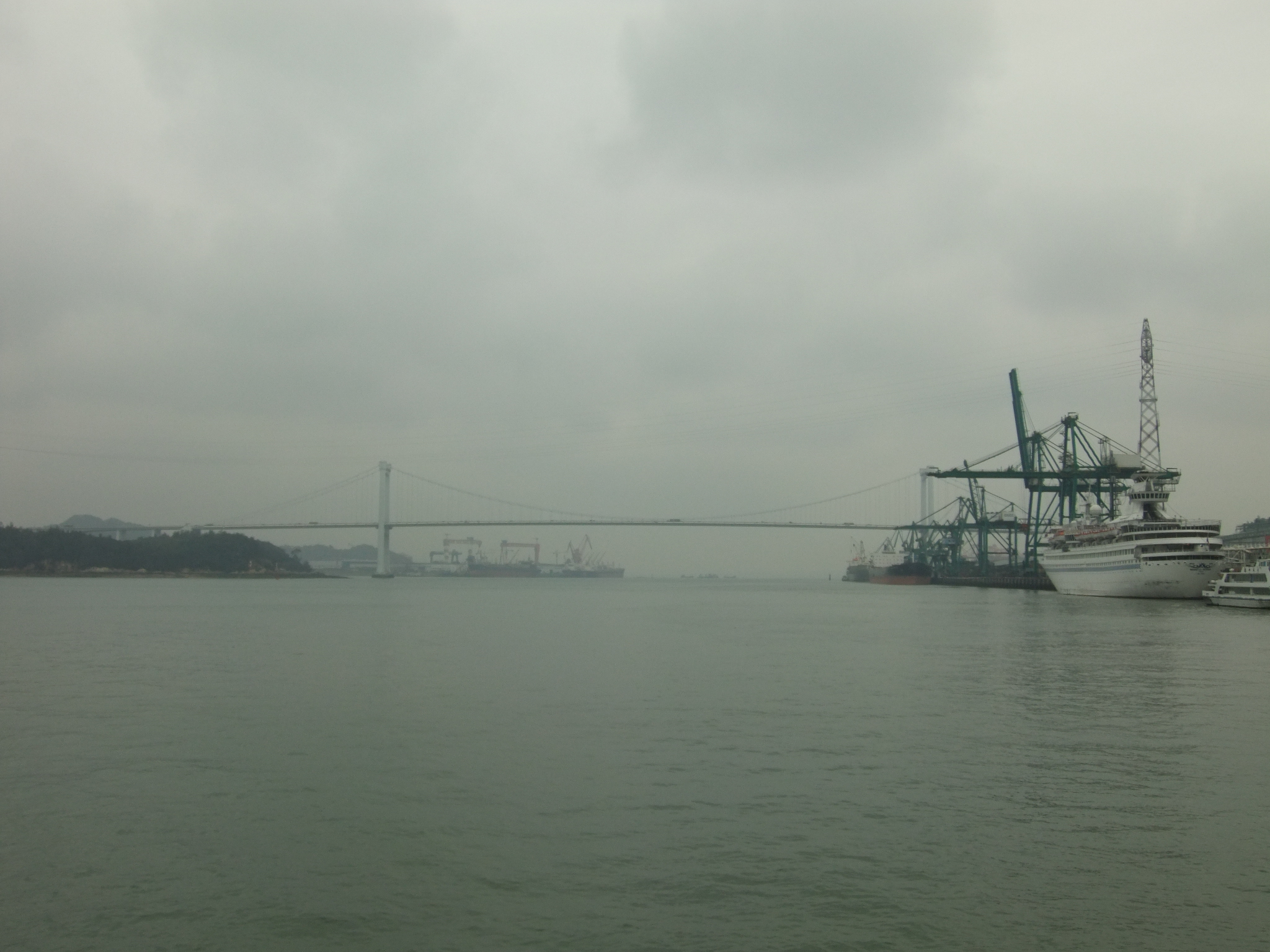
- Some of Xiamen port facilities, seen against the background of Haicang Bridge
- Click on the map for a fullscreen view

Location
- Country: People's Republic of China
- Location: Xiamen, Fujian

Details
- Owned by: Xiamen Port Authority

Port of Xiamen
- Simplified Chinese: 厦门港
- Traditional Chinese: 廈門港
Transcriptions
Standard Mandarin
- Hanyu Pinyin: Xià Mén Gǎng
- Wade–Giles: Hah Mùhn Góng
Southern Min
- Hokkien POJ: E-mng Kang

The Port of Xiamen or Port of Amoy or Amoy Port is an important deep water port located on Xiamen Island, the adjacent mainland coast, and along the estuary of the Jiulong River in southern Fujian, China. It is one of the trunk line ports in the Asia-Pacific region. In 2024, it is ranked the 8th-largest container port in China and ranks 13th in the world. It is the 4th port in China with the capacity to handle 6th-generation large container vessels. In 2013, Xiamen handled 191 million tons of cargo, including 8.08 million TEUs of containers. On 31 August 2010, Xiamen Port incorporated the neighboring port of Zhangzhou to form the largest port of China's Southeast. This was a relatively uncommon case of ports merging across jurisdictions.

The port comprises twelve areas including Heping, Dongdu, Haitian, Shihushan, Gaoqi, and Liuwudian (in Tong'an District).

The world's top 20 shipping companies have all established major shipping routes and operations in Xiamen. A total of 68 shipping routes serve over 50 countries to almost all the major ports in the world, yielding an average 469 ship calls at the port each month. In addition, passenger services also operate from Xiamen to Hong Kong, Guangzhou, Shanghai and Wenzhou, as well as frequent ferry service to the Shuitou terminal in Kinmen Island (R.O.C.).

The port is owned and operated by Xiamen Port Authority (厦门港口管理局) which is a department of the Xiamen Municipal Government.

The port is part of the 21st Century Maritime Silk Road that runs from the Chinese coast to Singapore, towards the southern tip of India to Mombasa, from there through the Red Sea via the Suez Canal to the Mediterranean, there to the Upper Adriatic region to the northern Italian hub of Trieste with its connections to Central Europe and the North Sea. The port is also home to a coast guard base.

== Infrastructure ==
Xiamen is a well-developed first-class port. Dongdu harbor is located on Haicang district which is on the mainland. The coast line in the harbor area stretches for 30 kilometres (19 mi), and the depth of water reaches up to 17 metres (56 ft).

The port offers 74 berths. One can handle vessels of 100,000 or more tonnes, 23 berths are for 10,000 or more tonnes, and two handle vessels between berths for 5,000 and 10,000 tonnes. There are nine container terminals.

== Approach Channel ==
Ships approaching and departing from Xiamen Port uses the channel between ROC-controlled Dadan Island and PRC-controlled Qingyu Island to access the Taiwan Strait. Starting December 2015, Taiwan's Ministry of Transportation and Communications opened the channel between Dadan Island and Menghu Islet (both are ROC-controlled) as a shortcut for ships using the Liuwudian, Xiang'an area of the Xiamen Port.

== Developments ==
Xiamen is the first mainland port to start the direct shipment of cargo to Kaohsiung in Taiwan. The initial cargo handling capacity totalled 1.34 million TEUs of containers.
