= Kinmen Defense Command =

- 金門防衛指揮部 (Chinese)
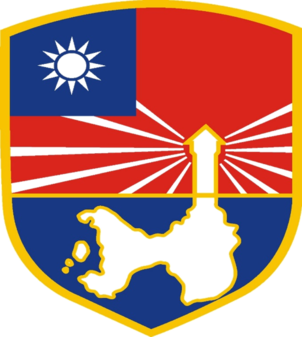
- Badge of the Kiman Defense Command
- Active: 1949–present
- Country: Republic of China
- Branch: Republic of China Army
- Type: Command
- Size: about 3,000
- Garrison/HQ: Kinmen
- Nickname: Taiwu Troops

Commanders
- Commander: Lieutenant General Li Dingzhong
- Deputy Commander: Major General Zhou Guojian
- Chief of Staff: Major General Li Qihuan

The Kinmen Defense Command (Chinese: 金門防衛指揮部, abbreviated as: Kinmen Defense Command, team name "Taiwu Force") is one of the defense commands under the Republic of China Army. The command is stationed in Kinmen County, with a total strength of about 3,000. The commander is a lieutenant general. He is responsible for combat command and military control in the Kinmen area during wartime. In its heyday, the total strength was about 100,000. The team's name was originally "Qingtian" Force", and has been responsible for the first-line defense tasks in the free areas of the Republic of China since its establishment. In March 2006, in compliance with the National Defense Organization Law, it was renamed the Kinmen Defense Command. The command was formerly known as the Army's Twelfth Corps.

The force maintains troops on Dadan and Erdan Islands.

== Organization ==
Kinmen Defense Command (金門防衛指揮部)

- Jindong (金東, Kinmen East) Defense Team
- Jinshih (金西, Kinmen West) Defense Team
- Shihyu (獅嶼) Defense Team
- Artillery Group
