= Baishui =

Baishui (Chinese: 白水, lit. "White Water") may refer to:

== Places ==
- The Baishui River (白水江, Baishuijiang)
- Baishui County (白水县, Baishuixian), in Weinan, Shaanxi
- Baishui Town (disambiguation) (白水镇, Baishuizhen), for all towns named Baishui
- Baishui, Miluo (白水镇), a town in Miluo City, Hunan province
- several Baishui Townships (白水乡, Baishuixiang)
  - Baishui Township, Guiyang County, in Guiyang County, Hunan
  - Baishui Township, Wanzai County, in Wanzai County, Jiangxi
  - Baishui Township, Luxi County, Yunnan, in Luxi County, Yunnan
