= Shiyu =

Shiyu may refer to

- Shi Islet
- A New Account of the Tales of the World (Shishuo Xinyu)
- Wei Jin Shiyu, a source cited by Pei Songzhi in his annotations to Sanguozhi.
