= Baishui, Fujian =

Coordinates: 24.3332°N 117.8664°E

Baishui (Chinese: 白水镇; pinyin: Báishuǐ Zhèn; Pe̍h-ōe-jī: Pe̍h-chúi-tìn) is a town in Longhai county-level city, in the municipal region of Zhangzhou, Fujian. It lies on the right bank of the Jiulong River's south branch. It is also referred to as "Pechuia"(simplified Chinese: 白水营; traditional Chinese: 白水營; Pe̍h-ōe-jī: Pe̍h-chúi-iâⁿ) in 19/20th-century missionary records.

== Specialities ==
Baishui is famous for its peanut candy, cooked and packaged in streetfront shops throughout the town.

== Administration ==
The town runs 1 neighbourhood and 15 village committees.

Population : 44682 (2003)

=== Villages ===
- Baishui (白水村)
- Fangtian (方田村)
- Xifeng (西凤村)
- Jiaobian (郊边村)
- Loukeng (楼埭村)
- JinAo (金鳌村)
- Jingyuan (井园村)
- Shanmei (山美村)
- Zhuanglin (庄林村)
- Cimei (磁美村)
- Shanbian (山边村)
- Xialiao (下辽村)
- Daxia (大下村)
- Xiatian (下田村)

== Transportation ==
Dongyuan Town lies right across the river and is accessible by ferry. A faster, closed-cabin boat takes passengers downriver to Xiamen (40 min).

The Shenyang-Haikou Expressway passes through the town, but has no exit/entrance here.
