= Haicheng County =

Historical county of China

Haicheng County 海澄縣
- County of China
- 1567–1960
- History
  - Established: 17 January 1567
  - Disestablished: 1960
| Succeeded by |
| Longhai City |
- Today part of: China

Haicheng County
- Traditional Chinese: 海澄縣
Transcriptions
Standard Mandarin
- Hanyu Pinyin: Hǎichéng Xiàn
- Wade–Giles: Hai^{3}cheng^{2} Hsien^{4}
Southern Min
- Hokkien POJ: Hái-têng-koān

Haicheng County was a historic county in South China, dating to the Ming Dynasty. During the late Ming Dynasty, Haicheng was one of China's most important ports, earning the moniker "Little Suzhou-Hangzhou" (小蘇杭), a reference to the historically prominent trading centers of Hangzhou and Suzhou.

== History ==
Haicheng was elevated to county status on 17 January 1567 during the Ming Dynasty, and was the site of Yuegang (Moon Harbor), a major seaport handling the majority of maritime trade with Southeast Asia. Haicheng County was merged with Longxi County in 1960 to form the modern-day Longhai City in Fujian Province. For most of its history, the administrative center of the county was in Shima (石碼).
