= Gangwei =

Town in Longhai, Zhangzhou, Fujian, China

Gangwei 港尾镇 Chiang-wei, Kang-wei
- Town
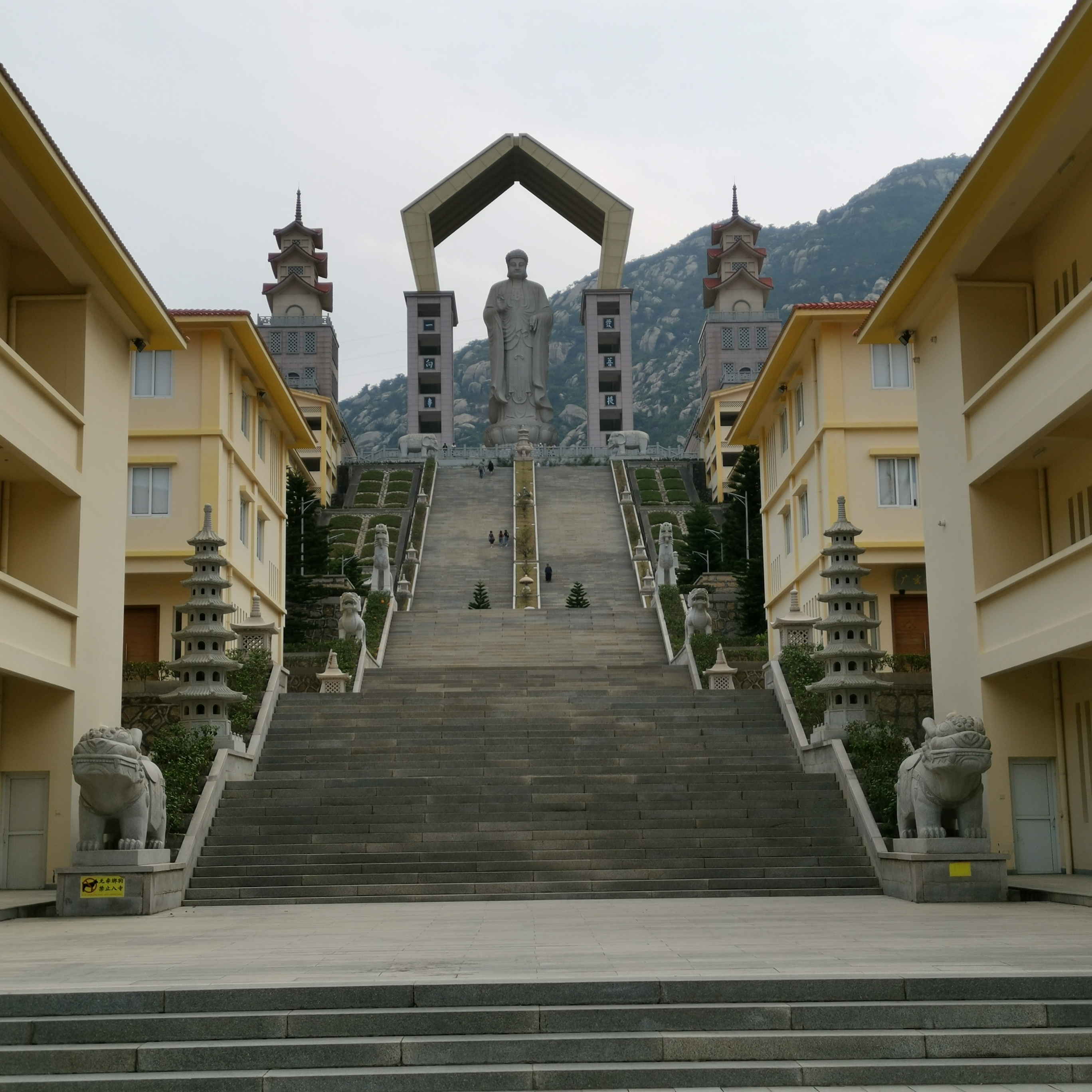
- Zuoqi Village Puzhao Zen Temple

- Location in the South China Sea Gangwei (Southeast Asia) Gangwei (Asia)
- Country: People's Republic of China
- Province: Fujian
- Prefecture-level city: Zhangzhou
- County-level city: Longhai
- Village-level divisions: 16

Area
  - Total: 147.2 km^{2} (56.8 sq mi)

Population (2010)
  - Total: 46,790
  - Density: 317.9/km^{2} (823.3/sq mi)
- Time zone: UTC+8 (China Standard)

Location of Gangwei

Gangwei (Chinese: 港尾镇; pinyin: Gǎngwěi Zhèn; Pe̍h-ōe-jī: Káng-bóe-tìn) is a town in Longhai City, in Zhangzhou, Fujian, China (PRC).

== History ==
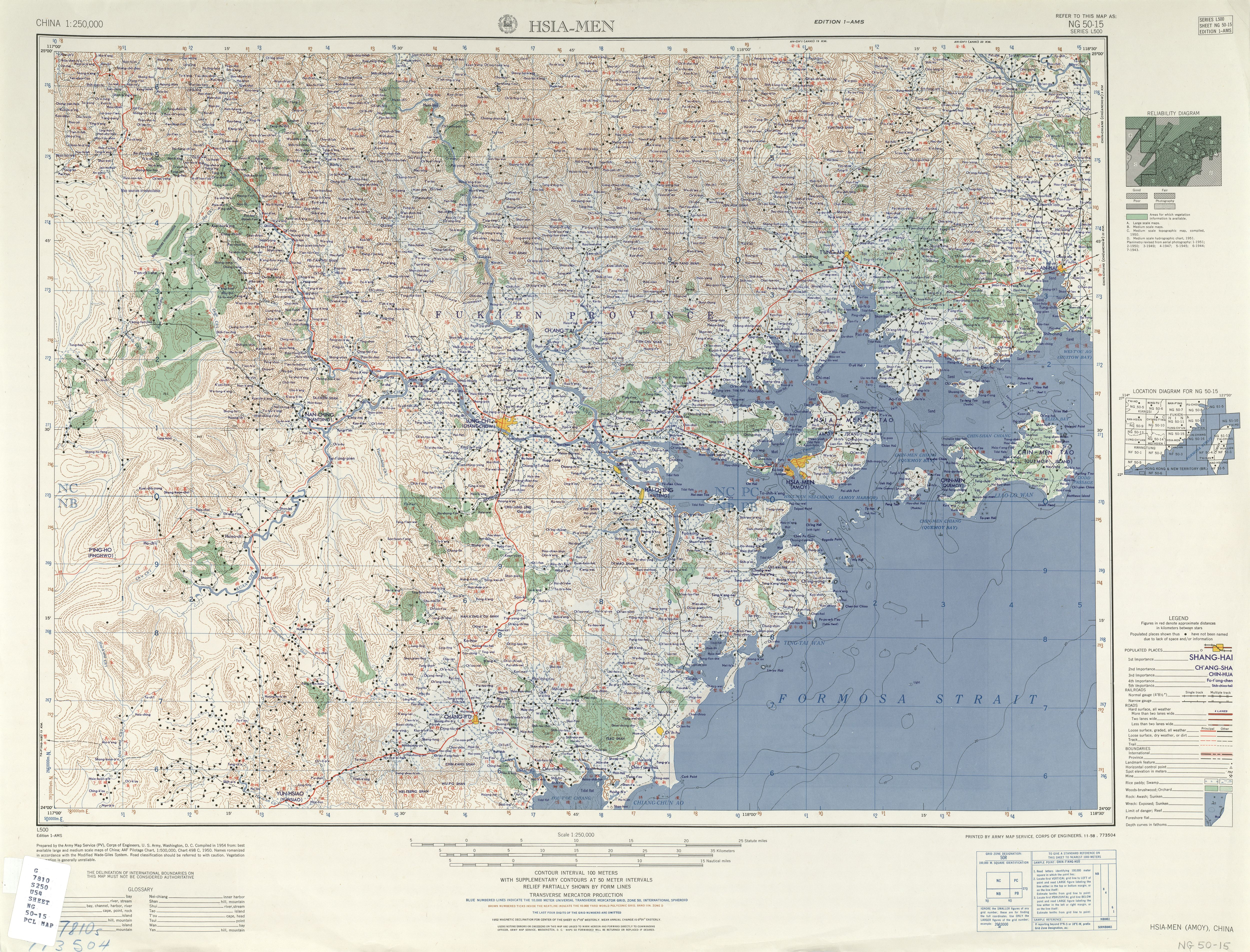
Map including Gangwei (labeled as Chiang-wei) (AMS, 1954)

In the Second Taiwan Strait Crisis in 1958, Daomei (岛美) in Gangwei was one of the areas from which PLA forces shelled Kinmen County (Quemoy), Republic of China (Taiwan). The Daomei milita dug eleven trenches and built 136 air raid shelters. On September 8, Chinese Nationalist forces fired 1,285 shells at Wu Yu, destroying 151 homes and a granary. 37 members of the Daomei militia took eight boats to Wu Yu bringing 130,000 jin of food for the islanders. No one died or was injured.

In February–March 1959, Huojian Commune ('rocket commune'; 火箭公社) and Hongqi Commune ('red flag commune'; 红旗公社) were combined to create Gangwei Commune (港尾公社).

In late 1984, Gangwei Commune became Gangwei Township (港尾乡).

On January 1, 1988, ten villages of Gangwei Township were transferred to Longjiao She Ethnic Township (隆教畲族乡).

On December 29, 1988, Gangwei Township became Gangwei Town (港尾镇).

Railway development plans include the construction of a 45-km-long branch line from Zhangzhou railway station eastward, across most of Longhai City, to terminate at the China Merchants Group industrial area (招商局漳州开发区) on the southwestern shore of Xiamen Harbor, opposite Xiamen Island (24°24′31″N 118°01′037″E). The branch will be known as the Gangwei Railway (港尾铁路), and will support trains running at speeds up to 120 km/h. Its opening is planned for 2013.

== Geography ==
Islands in Gangwei include:

- Bai Yu (白屿)
- Shuangyu Dao (双鱼岛), man-made island 24.378458°N 118.067306°E
- Pozao Yu (破灶屿)
- Qing Yu (Ch'ing Hsü, Chingyu; 青屿 / 青嶼, also 下青屿) 24.363631°N 118.124438°E (southwest of Dadan Island and Erdan Island in Lieyu Township, Kinmen County, Taiwan (ROC))
- Wu'an Yu (浯垵屿)
- Wu Yu (Wu Hsu; 浯屿/浯屿岛) 24.331636°N 118.14494°E (south of Dadan Island and Erdan Island in Lieyu Township, Kinmen County, Taiwan (ROC))
- Xiaopozao Yu (小破灶屿)

== Administrative divisions ==
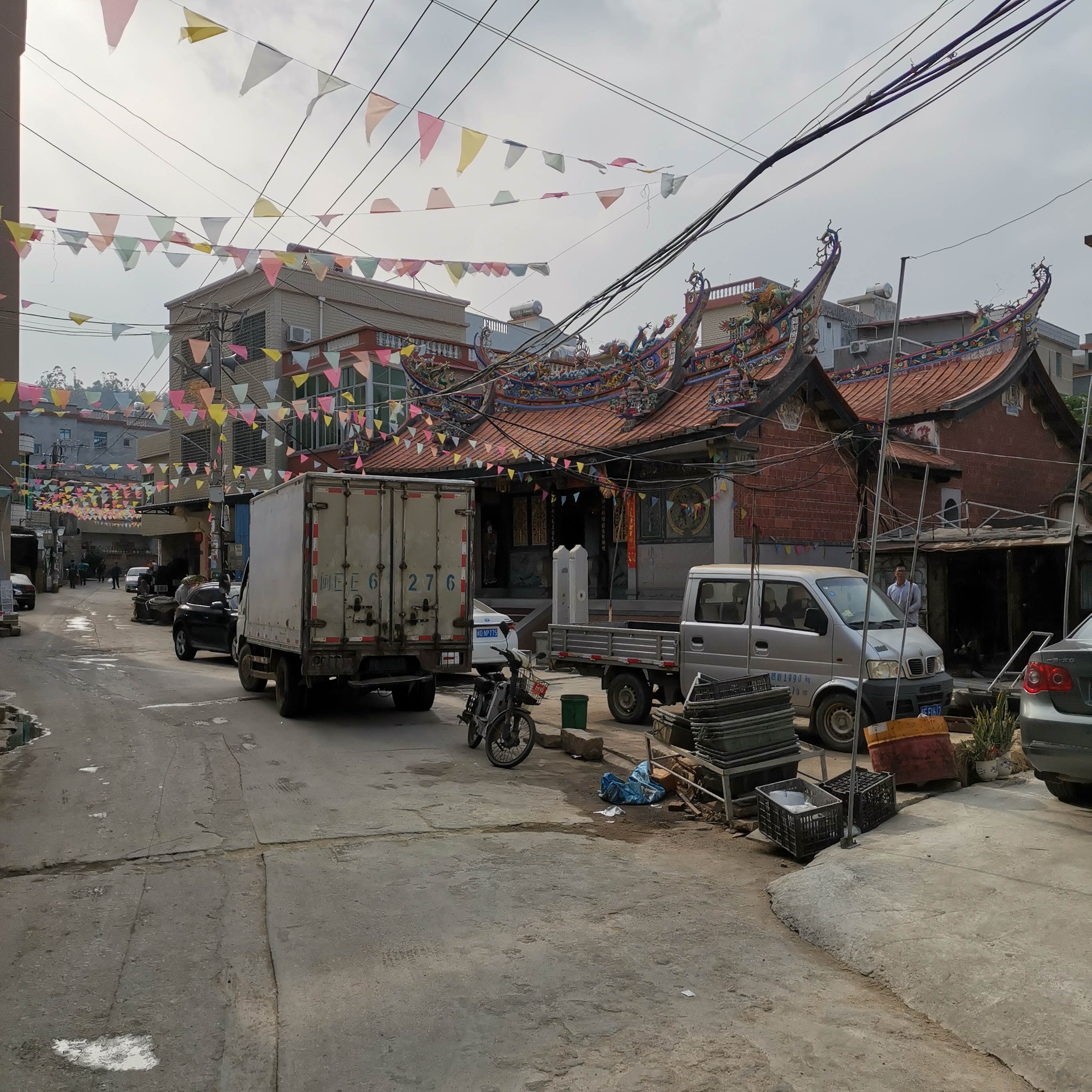
Doumei Village

The town administers 1 residential community and 15 villages:

- Meishi (梅市社区)
- Tangtou (汤头村)
- Dongkeng (东坑村)
- Gucheng (古城村)
- Shengshan (省山村)
- Shibu (石埠村)
- Shangwu (上午村)
- Meishi (梅市村) - Longhai sheriff's substation (派出所, paichusuo)
- Chengwai (城外村)
- Gelin (格林村)
- Shatan/Shayun (沙坛村/沙澐村)
- Kaohou (考后村)
- Zhuoqi (卓岐村/卓崎村)
- Doumei (斗美村)
- Shenwo/Shen'ao (深沃村/深澳村)
- Wuyu (浯屿村), centered on the island Wu Yu

== Demographics ==
Historical population
Year	Pop.	±% p.a.
2000	58,562	—
2010	46,790	−2.22%
