= Baishui Town =

Baishui (白水镇, lit. "white water") could refer to the following Chinese towns:

- Baishui, Fujian, in Longhai
- Baishui, Gansu, in Kongtong District, Pingliang
- Baishui, Guizhou, in Guanling Buyei and Miao Autonomous County
- Baishui, Miluo, Hunan
- Baishui, Qiyang County, Hunan
- Baishui, Jishui County, Jiangxi
- Baishui, Wangcang County, Sichuan
- Baishui, Honghe, in Luxi County, Yunnan
- Baishui, Zhanyi County, Yunnan
