= Haicheng, Fujian =

Haicheng 海澄镇 Hái-têng
- Town
- Location in Fujian Haicheng (China)
- Coordinates: 24°24′54″N 117°51′3″E
- Country: People's Republic of China
- Province: Fujian
- Prefecture-level city: Zhangzhou
- County-level city: Longhai
- Time zone: UTC+8 (China Standard)

Haicheng, Fujian
- Chinese: 海澄
Transcriptions
Standard Mandarin
- Hanyu Pinyin: Hǎichéng
Southern Min
- Hokkien POJ: Hái-têng

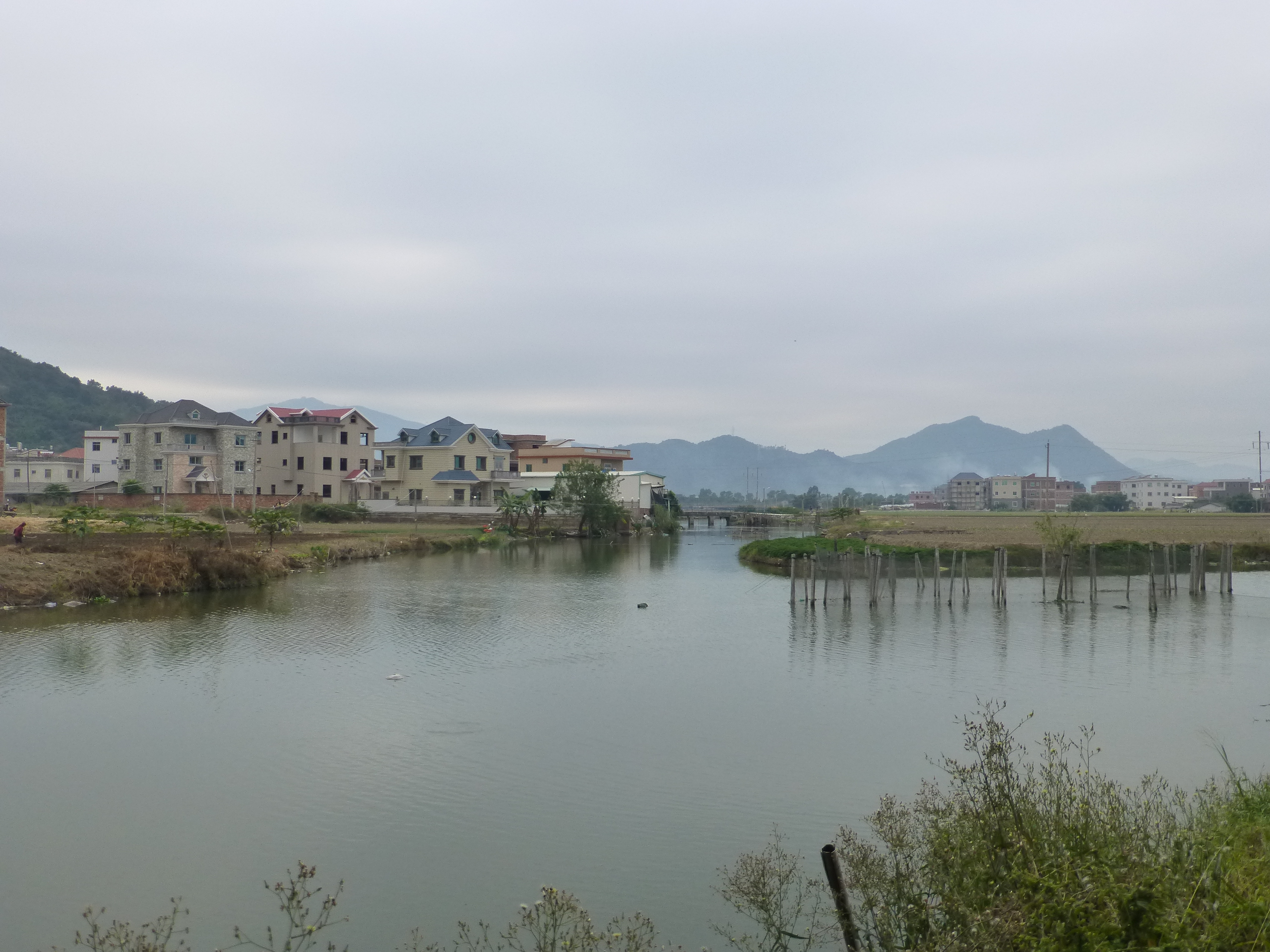
Around Haicheng Town, Longhai City

Haicheng (Chinese: 海澄; pinyin: Hǎichéng; Pe̍h-ōe-jī: Hái-têng) is a town of Longhai City, Fujian, China. As of 2018, it has 5 residential communities and 19 villages under its administration.

== History ==
Haicheng used to be known as Yuegang (lit. 'Moon Harbor') for its crescent-shaped shoreline. It was a bustling port during the Ming dynasty even under the sea ban (haijin) which prohibited private maritime trade. Following the revocation of the sea ban in the 1567, the old smuggling port of Yuegang was renamed to Haicheng ("clear seas") and was designated to be the port where foreign trade (except with Japan) was to be conducted in Fujian. Haicheng became a key port for China's silver trade with Manila in the Spanish Philippines and rose to become one of Fujian's four main commercial ports.
