= Shi Islet =

Islet west of Taiwan

Coordinates: 24.4557079°N 118.2269356°E

Native name: 獅嶼 (Chinese)
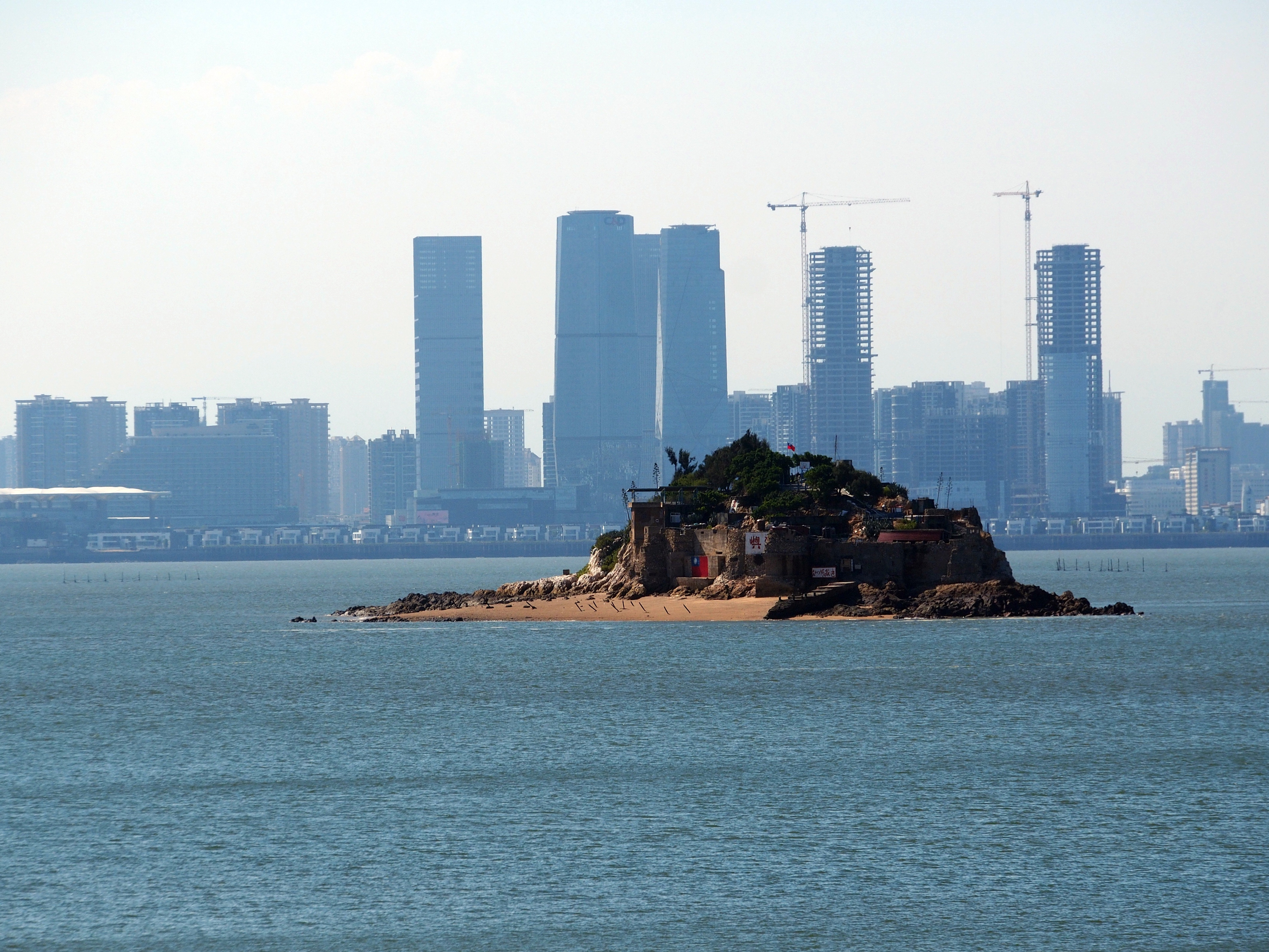
- Shi Islet with Xiamen City in background
- Interactive map of Shi Islet

Geography
- Location: Lieyu Township, Kinmen County (Quemoy), Fujian (Fukien), Republic of China (Taiwan)
- Area: 0.0070 km^{2} (0.0027 sq mi)

Administration
- Republic of China (Taiwan)
- Province: Fujian (Fukien) (streamlined)
- County: Kinmen (Quemoy)
- Rural Township: Lieyu

Additional information
- Time zone: National Standard Time (UTC+8)

Location of Shi Islet

Shi Islet (Chinese: 獅嶼; pinyin: Shī Yǔ; Pe̍h-ōe-jī: sai-sū; lit. 'Lion Islet'; also Shi Yu, Shih Yü, Shiyu, Shiyu Islet and Lion Islet) is an islet located northwest of Lesser Kinmen (Lieyu) in Lieyu Township, Kinmen County (Quemoy), Fujian Province, Republic of China (Taiwan). Military personnel are stationed on Shi Islet.

The islet was originally named Shu Islet (鼠嶼; Shǔ Yǔ; 'rat islet'). The current name, given by Chiang Ching-kuo during his visits to military bases in Kinmen, was adopted in 1960.

== History ==
After 0:00 AM on July 7, 1953, the People's Liberation Army 31st Army 92nd Division landed on Shi Islet to start an attack on ROC troops, leading to 3 killed and 4 captured.

At around 4 PM on August 19, 2016, a 23 year old Chinese man landed on Shi Islet after rowing from Xiamen Island (Amoy) on a piece of polystyrene and was immediately arrested by the Shi Islet defense forces.

On July 23, 2019, Ho Cheng, the new leader of the ROC Army Kinmen Defense Command, visited the soldiers on Shi Islet and Menghu Islet.

=== Shiyu slaughter ===
In January 1985, a Chinese sampan carrying eight fisherman floated onshore the islet after its engine broke down and identified themself as civilians in emergency communication. Kinmen Defense Command ordered the stationed platoon to kill them regardless. Six died under crossfire; two escaped to a rock cave and kneeled down begging for mercy, then were pushed off the rock cliff to fall to death under the KDC's second urgent order.

Searching the sampan later only found a fisher's letter draft to his mother about having collected sufficient yarn to knit a sweater for her to pass the winter. The letter was submitted, but the case was covered with the corpses hidden under the beach west of the harbor. Then the soldiers were warned not to leak any information and transferred to another post on Kinmen main island.

The case was hidden for 37 years until being exposed by another massacre's re-investigation in 2022.

== Geography ==
Shi Islet is located 1 km (0.62 mi) from Lesser Kinmen Island (Lieyu) and 4 km (2.5 mi) from Xiamen Island (Amoy), Fujian, China (PRC).

== In popular culture ==
The islet appeared in the 2010 Japanese movie Liar Game: The Final Stage.

== Gallery ==
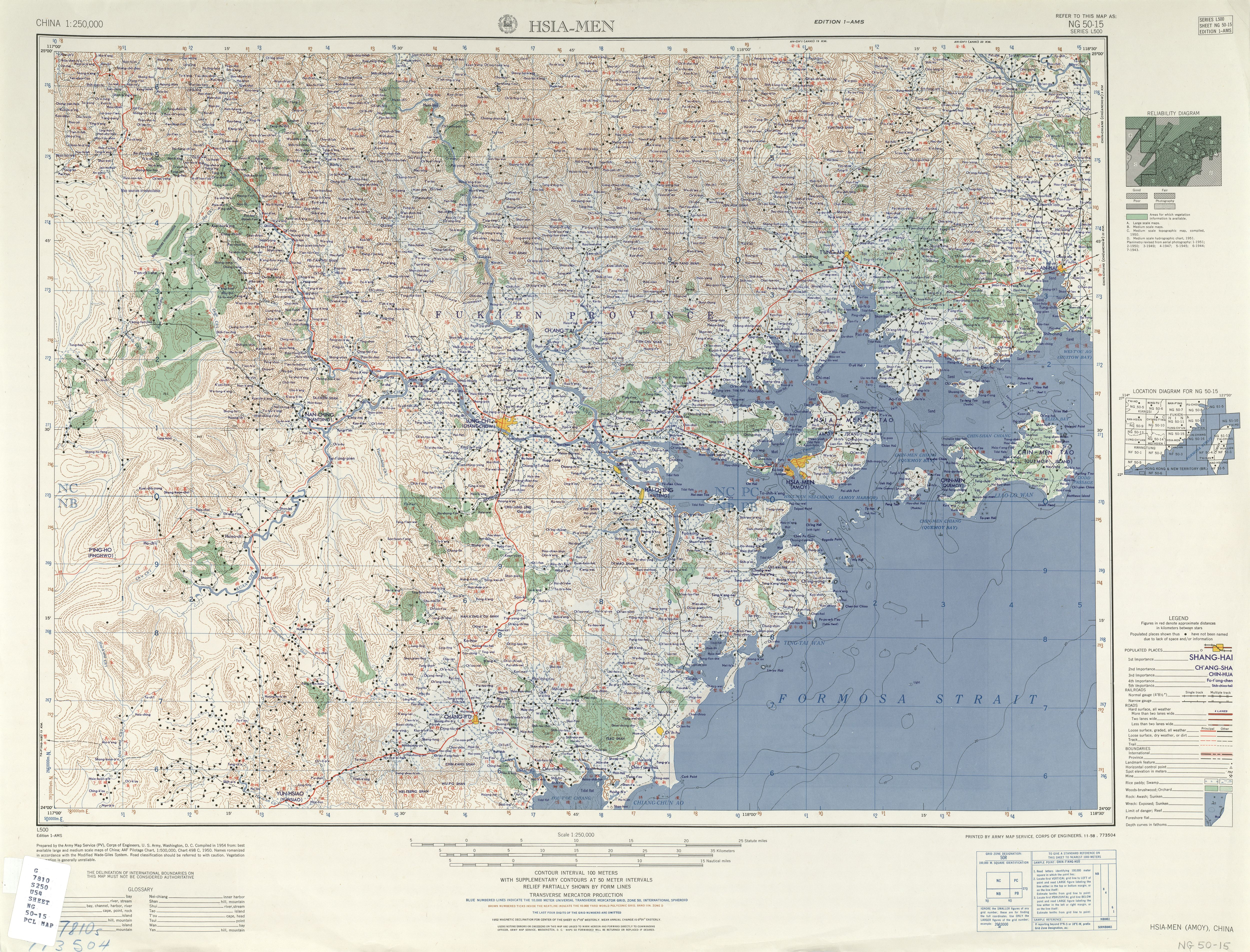
Map including Shi Islet (unlabelled islet between Lieyu (Lesser Kinmen) and Xiamen Island (Amoy)) (AMS, 1954)

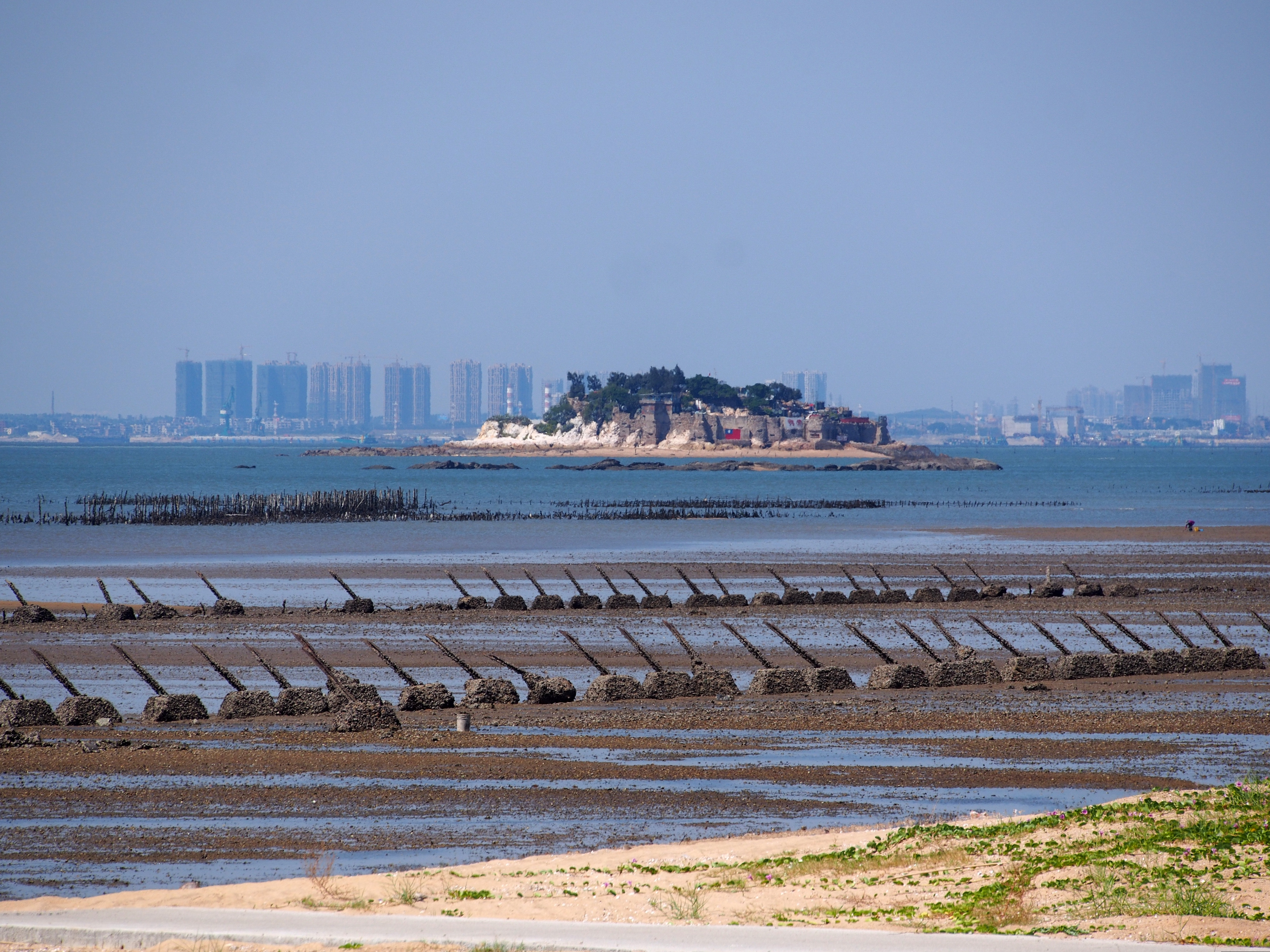
Shi Islet (background) and Anti-landing Spikes on Lesser Kinmen's Shanglin Coast (foreground)

== See also ==
- List of islands of Taiwan
