= Erdan Island =

Island in Lieyu, Kinmen, Republic of China

Native name: 二膽島
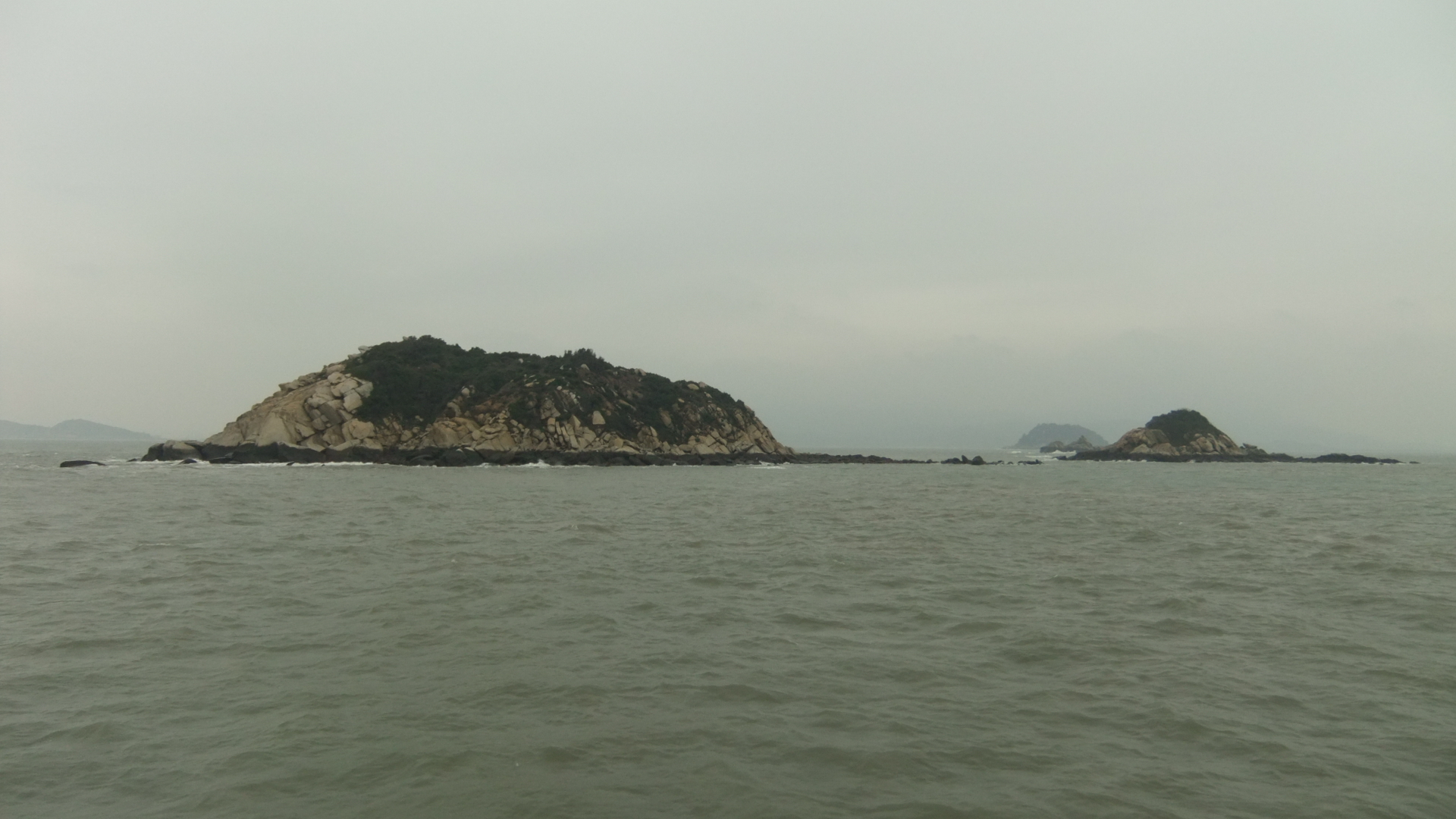
- View of Dadan Island and Erdan Island

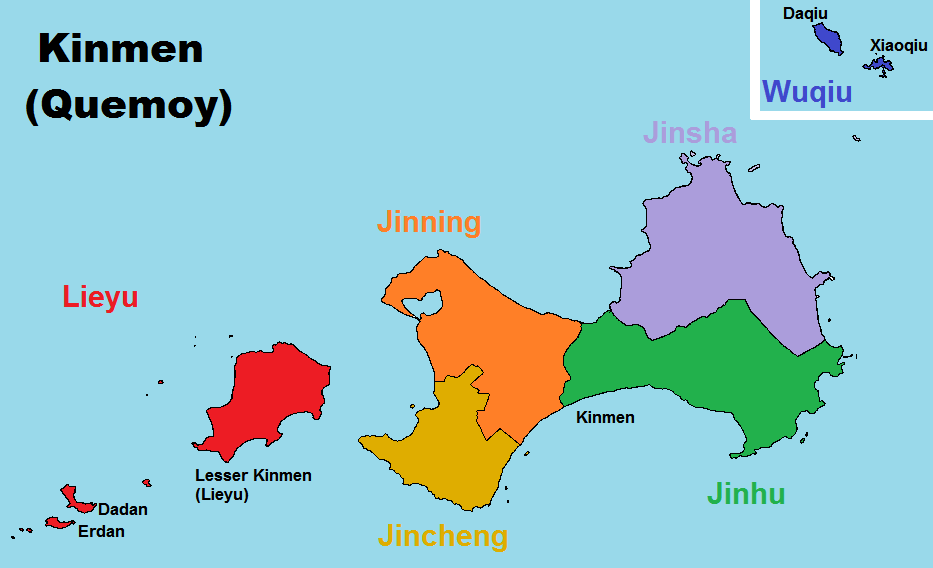
- Erdan Island in Kinmen County

- Taiwan

Geography
- Location: Lieyu Township, Kinmen County (Quemoy), Fuchien, Republic of China (Taiwan)
- Coordinates: 24°22′40.9″N 118°09′40.7″E
- Area: 0.2800 km^{2} (0.1081 sq mi)

Erdan Island (Erhtan Island) (Chinese: 二膽島; pinyin: Èrdǎn Dǎo, also 二擔島) is an island in Lieyu Township, Kinmen County (Quemoy), Taiwan. The island has been called Seao-tan. Erdan Island is 12 km (7.5 mi) from Greater Kinmen Island and 4 km (2.5 mi) from Xiamen (Amoy) Island.

== History ==
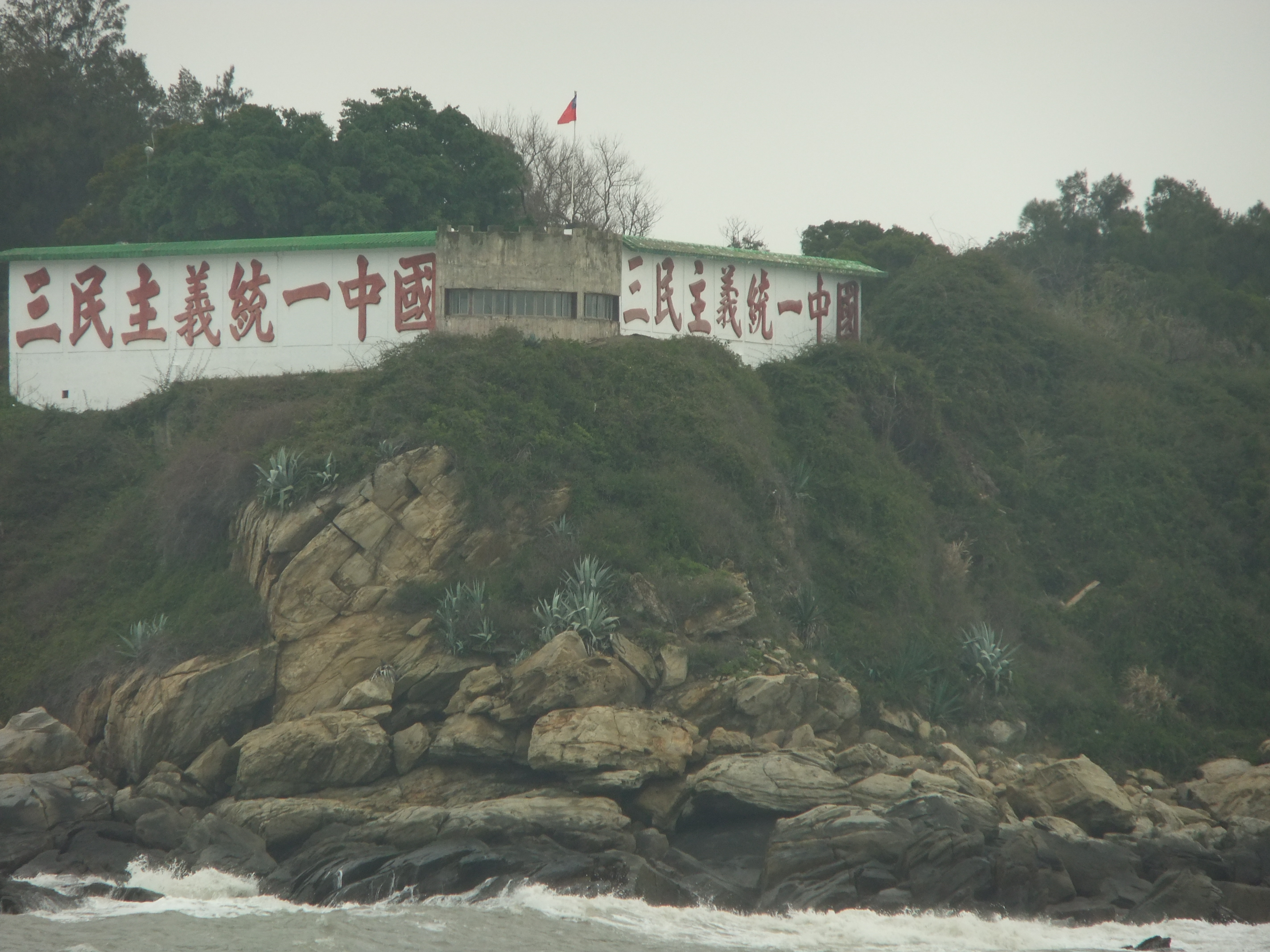
Fortress wall bearing slogan "Three Principles of the People Unite China" built by Gen. Zhao in Aug. 1986, dismissed after 1987 Lieyu Massacre.

External image
- Declassified nuclear strike plan portraits significance of Erdan's critical position in history of Cold War

On February 21, 1942, more than fifty anti-Japanese dissidents were taken to the island, tortured and killed in a mass execution.

Chinese Nationalist spokesmen reported that Chinese Communists shelled Dadan and Erdan between June 26–28, 1957. At that time, Chinese Nationalist strength on the islands was around 1,100 men.

On September 6, 2011, President Ma Ying-jeou visited with the troops stationed on Erdan Island.

In November 2013, the island was designated as battlefield culture landscape by the Cultural Affairs Bureau of Kinmen County Government. The island was handed over from Kinmen Defense Command of the Republic of China Armed Forces to the county government on 1 July 2014.

On August 16, 2022, two Taiwan soldiers on Erdan threw stones at a Chinese drone that got near their guard post. On August 30, 2022, Taiwan soldiers on Erdan fired at a Chinese drone.

On March 9, 2023, Chen Chia-hsun (陳嘉壎), a Taiwan soldier on Erdan, was missing at roll call. He allegedly deserted to China.

== Geography ==
The island covers an area of 0.28 km^{2} (0.11 mi^{2}). Erdan Island's Mt. Jiaoshi (Mt. Jiaoshih; 礁石山) reaches 55 m (180 ft) above sea level.

Dadan Island is 800 m (2,600 ft) from Erdan Island at the closest point.

The islands of Wu Yu and Qing Yu in Gangwei, Longhai City, Zhangzhou, Fujian, China are located to the south of Erdan Island.

== Tourist attractions ==
- Erdan Hero Tunnel

== See also ==
- List of islands of Taiwan
- Dadan Island
