= Longhai, Zhangzhou =

Longhai 龙海区 Liông-hái, Lung-hai
- District
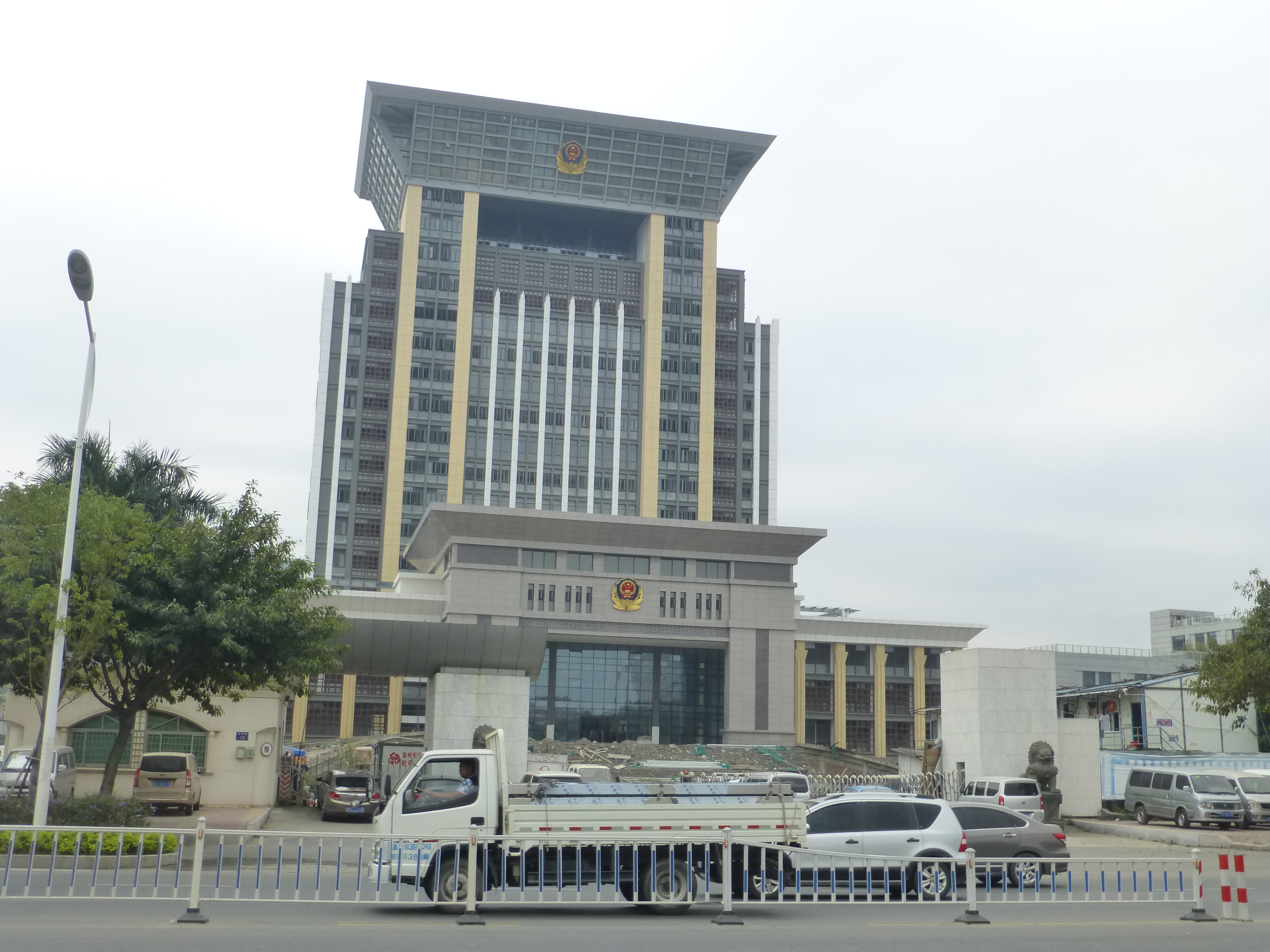
- Government offices in Longhai

- Location in Fujian
- Coordinates: 24°27′N 117°48′E
- Country: People's Republic of China
- Province: Fujian
- Prefecture-level city: Zhangzhou

Area
  - Total: 1,117.17 km^{2} (431.34 sq mi)

Population (2020)
  - Total: 952,000
  - Density: 852/km^{2} (2,210/sq mi)
- Time zone: UTC+8 (China Standard)
- Website: www.lhw.gov.cn

Longhai, Zhangzhou
- Traditional Chinese: 龍海
- Simplified Chinese: 龙海
- Literal meaning: Dragon Sea
Transcriptions
Standard Mandarin
- Hanyu Pinyin: Lónghǎi
Southern Min
- Hokkien POJ: Liông-hái

Longhai District (simplified Chinese: 龙海区; traditional Chinese: 龍海區; pinyin: Lónghǎi Qū; Pe̍h-ōe-jī: Liông-hái-khu / Liông-hái-khi) is a district in Zhangzhou, in the south of Fujian province, China.

Longhai spans an area of 1,117.17 square kilometres (431.34 mi^{2}), and, as of 2016, it has a population of approximately 736,400.

== History ==
Following the revocation of the sea ban (haijin) in the late Ming, Yuegang (within present-day Haicheng in Longhai) became a key port for China's silver trade with Manila in the Spanish Philippines. It was one of Fujian's four main commercial ports.

It was formed from the merger of the former Longxi (Lungki) (龍溪縣; Liông-khe koān) and Haicheng (海澄縣; Hái-têng koān) counties on August 15, 1960.

== Geography ==
Longhai located along the lower banks of the Jiulong River, with mountainous terrain in its western, southern, and northern portions, and the Xiamen Bay to its east. The city's highest point is Mount Dajian (大尖山) in Chengxi, which reaches 953.6 metres (3,129 ft) in elevation. The city's lowest point is Jiujiejiao (九节礁) on Wuyu Island (浯屿岛) in Gangwei, which lies 47 metres (154 ft) below sea level. Longhai has three major river basins.

=== Climate ===
Climate data for Longhai, elevation 32 m (105 ft), (1991–2020 normals, extremes 1981–present)
Month	Jan	Feb	Mar	Apr	May	Jun	Jul	Aug	Sep	Oct	Nov	Dec	Year
Record high °C (°F)	28.5 (83.3)	28.7 (83.7)	31.5 (88.7)	33.5 (92.3)	39.5 (103.1)	36.5 (97.7)	38.0 (100.4)	37.6 (99.7)	35.8 (96.4)	34.5 (94.1)	34.4 (93.9)	27.0 (80.6)	39.5 (103.1)
Mean daily maximum °C (°F)	18.4 (65.1)	18.9 (66.0)	21.2 (70.2)	25.6 (78.1)	28.9 (84.0)	31.6 (88.9)	34.1 (93.4)	33.7 (92.7)	32.1 (89.8)	28.9 (84.0)	25.1 (77.2)	20.5 (68.9)	26.6 (79.9)
Daily mean °C (°F)	13.9 (57.0)	14.4 (57.9)	16.6 (61.9)	20.8 (69.4)	24.5 (76.1)	27.4 (81.3)	29.2 (84.6)	28.8 (83.8)	27.4 (81.3)	24.2 (75.6)	20.4 (68.7)	15.9 (60.6)	22.0 (71.5)
Mean daily minimum °C (°F)	11.0 (51.8)	11.6 (52.9)	13.7 (56.7)	17.7 (63.9)	21.4 (70.5)	24.5 (76.1)	25.8 (78.4)	25.6 (78.1)	24.3 (75.7)	20.8 (69.4)	17.2 (63.0)	12.8 (55.0)	18.9 (66.0)
Record low °C (°F)	1.8 (35.2)	0.7 (33.3)	2.8 (37.0)	8.0 (46.4)	13.1 (55.6)	16.1 (61.0)	21.5 (70.7)	19.7 (67.5)	17.1 (62.8)	11.7 (53.1)	6.4 (43.5)	0.7 (33.3)	0.7 (33.3)
Average precipitation mm (inches)	44.2 (1.74)	71.8 (2.83)	104.9 (4.13)	130.9 (5.15)	197.4 (7.77)	274.0 (10.79)	172.0 (6.77)	252.7 (9.95)	142.9 (5.63)	56.2 (2.21)	39.3 (1.55)	45.5 (1.79)	1,531.8 (60.31)
Average precipitation days (≥ 0.1 mm)	7.3	11.0	13.7	13.4	15.8	17.3	11.7	14.0	10.3	4.2	5.0	6.7	130.4
Average relative humidity (%)	73	76	77	77	79	81	76	78	75	68	70	70	75
Mean monthly sunshine hours	141.2	111.4	115.6	133.9	147.6	166.7	246.5	216.4	198.0	197.5	165.8	154.7	1,995.3
Percentage possible sunshine	42	35	31	35	36	41	59	54	54	55	51	47	45
Source: China Meteorological Administration All-time May high and May provincial record highall-time November high

== Administration ==
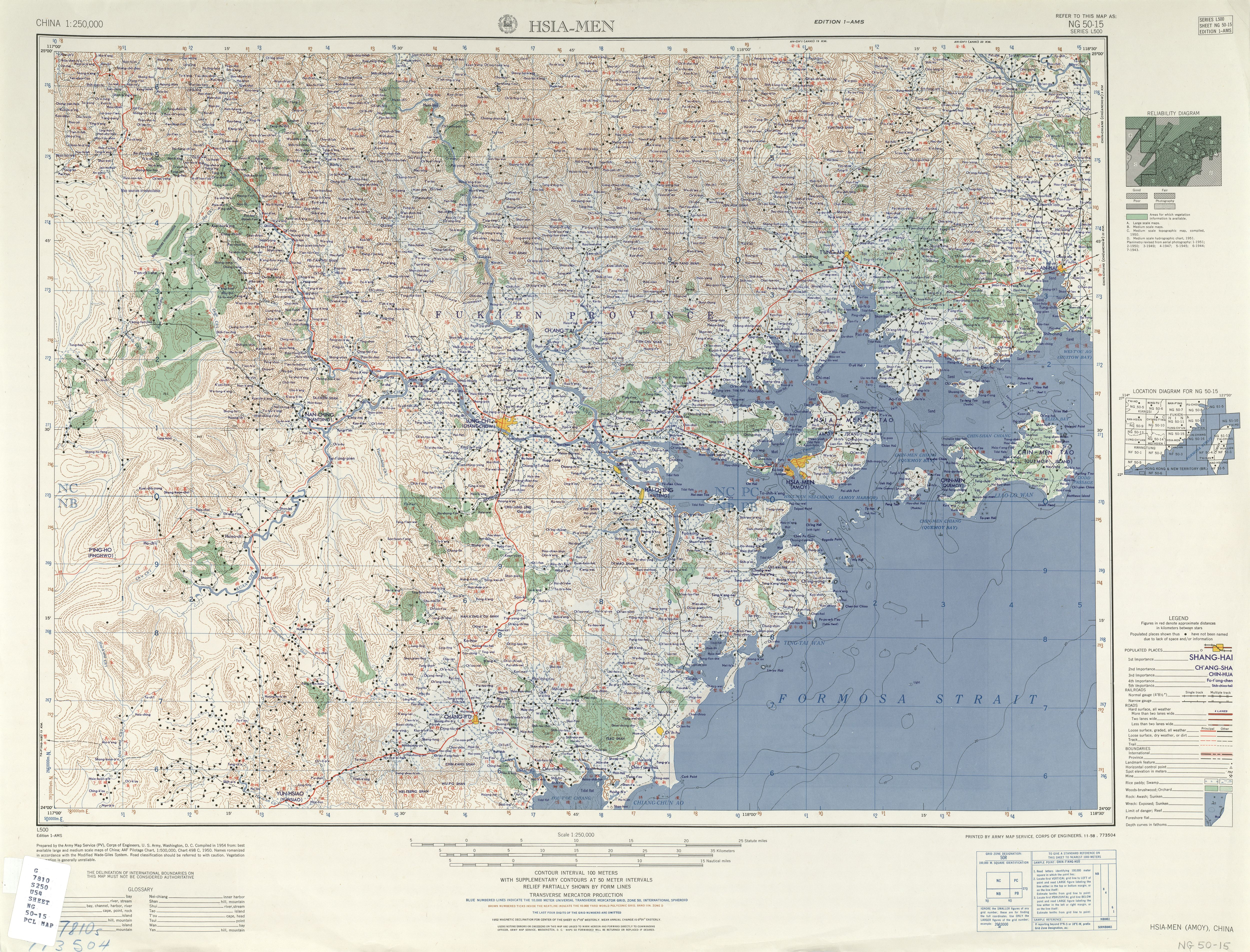
Map including Longhai (1954)

Longhai's main urban area comprises Shima. The city's executive, legislature and judiciary are located there, along with the CPC and PSB branches.

Longhai administers 12 towns, 1 township, 1 ethnic township, 3 township-level farms, 2 township-level tree farms, and 1 development zones.

=== Towns ===
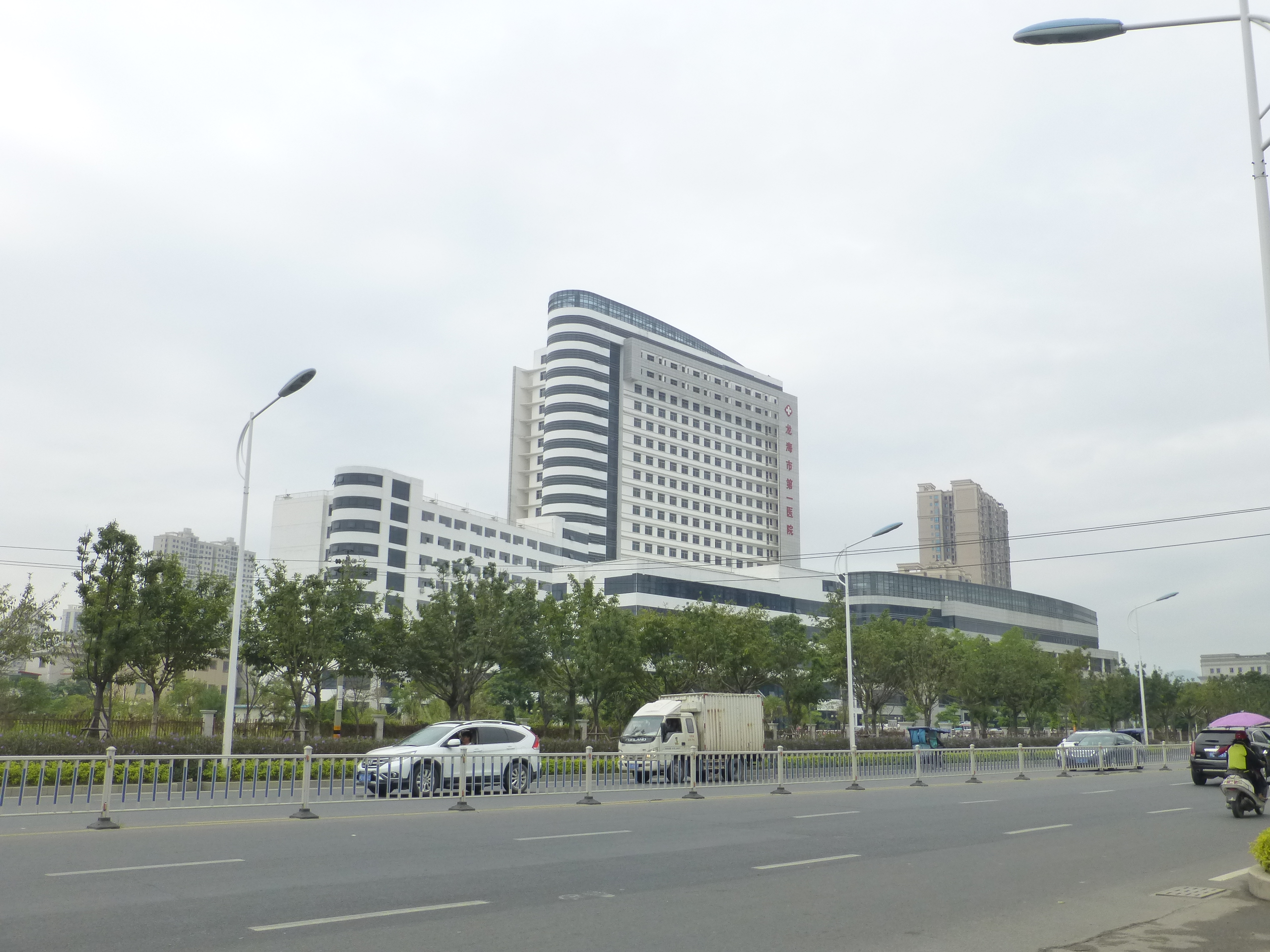
Longhai Hospital No. 1

Longhai's 12 towns are Shima, Haicheng, Jiaomei, Baishui, Fugong, Chengxi, Gangwei, Jiuhu, Yancuo, Bangshan, Zini, and Dongyuan.

=== Townships ===
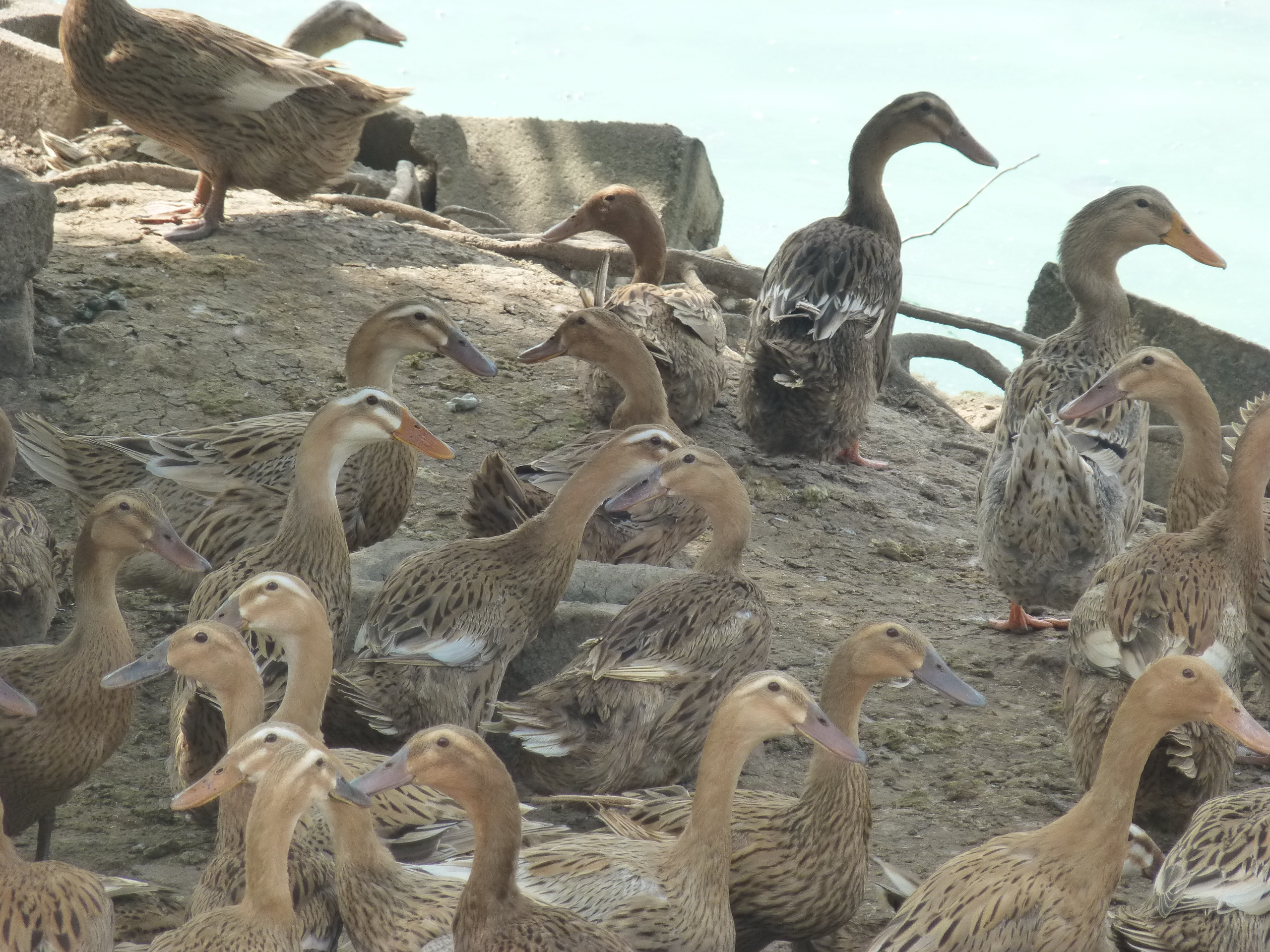
Ducks at Yancuo Town

Longhai's sole township is Dongsi Township.

=== Ethnic townships ===
Longhai's sole ethnic township is Longjiao She Ethnic Township.

=== Township-level farms ===
Longhai's 3 township-level farms are Shuangdi Overseas Chinese Farm (双第华侨农场), Chengxi Farm (程溪农场), and Longhai Seed Farm (良种场).

=== Township-level tree farms ===
Longhai's 2 township-level tree farms are Jiulongling Tree Farm (九龙岭林场) and Linxia Tree Farm (林下林场).

=== Development zones ===
Longhai's sole development zone is the Zhangzhou China Merchant's Group Development Zone. Strictly speaking, the zone stands within the territory of one or another of the city-administered towns, townships, etc. listed above.

== Demographics ==
As of 2016, the city has a population of 736,400, of which, 241,000 (32.7%) live in urban areas. 50.55% of the population is reported as males, and 49.45% as females. 20.05% of the population is under the age of 18, 25.50% are from ages 18 to 35, 37.70% are from ages 35–60, and 16.75% are over 60 years in age.

== Economy ==
As of 2016, the city's gross domestic product totaled ¥45.768 billion, and the city's economy grew 9.3% from the previous year. The mean annual disposable income of the city's urban residents totaled ¥31,621 that same year, and totaled ¥16,101 for rural residents.

Companies with a presence in Longhai include Maxxis, China National Offshore Oil Corporation, King Long, Fujian Zishan Group, Haixin Group, and China Greenfresh.

Longhai has a number of mineral deposits, and is home to 147 mining areas. Major minerals mined in Longhai include granite, tuff, peat, feldspar, and kaolin. Significant amounts of mineral water is also extracted in the city.

== Transportation ==
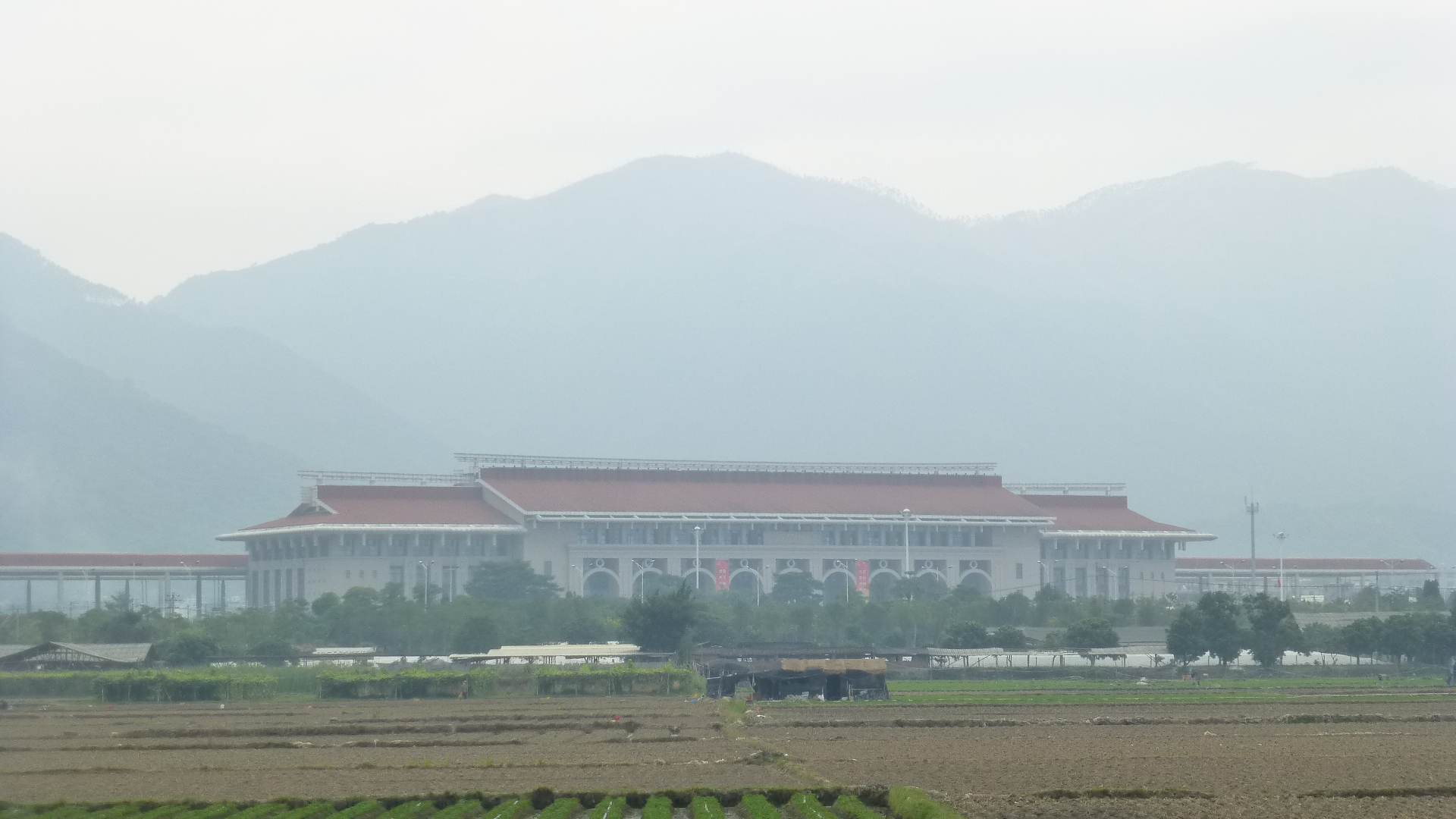
Zhangzhou Railway Station

Longhai's only railway station is Zhangzhou Railway Station. The station is located in It is located near Hongtang Village (洪塘村), in Yancuo, but, as its name indicates, it is actually closer to Zhangzhou's main urban area than to Longhai's. It is the junction of two high-speed rail lines: the Longyan-Xiamen Railway (opened in June 2012) and the Xiamen-Shenzhen Railway (to open by 2013), which share their tracks from Zhangzhou to Xiamen.

Railway development plans also include the construction of a 45-km-long branch line from Zhangzhou Railway Station eastward, across most of Longhai City to terminate at the Zhangzhou China Merchant's Group Development Zone in Gangwei on the southwestern shore of Xiamen Harbor, opposite Xiamen Island (24°24′00″N 118°03′00″E). The branch will be known as Gangwei Railway (港尾铁路), and will support trains running at speeds up to 120 km/h. Its opening is planned for 2013.

The Zhangzhou Port tariff-free industrial export zone is located in Gangwei.

== Notable people ==
- Corazon Aquino, the 11th President of the Philippines, traced her ancestry to the village of Hongjianwei, within Longhai.
- Lien Chan, a prominent Taiwanese politician, traces his ancestry to Longhai.
