= Yuegang =

Seaport in China

Locations of Yuegang, Zhangzhou, and Xiamen

Yuegang (Chinese: 月港; pinyin: Yuègǎng; Pe̍h-ōe-jī: Goe̍h-káng; lit. 'Moon Harbour') was a seaport situated at the estuary of the Jiulong River in present-day Haicheng town in Zhangzhou, Fujian, China. Known as a smuggling hub since the early Ming dynasty, Yuegang rose to prominence in the 16th century as the Ming government cracked down on other hubs of private maritime trade, deemed illegal at the time due to the isolationist haijin laws. When the prohibitions were lifted in 1567, Yuegang was designated as the port in Fujian from where it is legal to trade overseas. Since then, it flourished as the Chinese terminus of the trans-Pacific trade carried by the Manila galleon through its trade with the Spanish Philippines until it was overshadowed by Xiamen in the 17th century.

== Smuggling trade ==
The coastal province of Fujian was home to a long maritime tradition, giving rise to many great ports during the Song dynasty (960–1279) such as Quanzhou and Fuzhou, from where sea trade abroad to Southeast Asia, the Hindu world, the Islamic world, and the East African world brought merchants great fortune. These maritime trade networks were disrupted by the Mongol conquests, and the Ming dynasty who displaced the Mongols in the 14th century adopted an agrarian policy that discouraged private sea trade. Under the haijin ("maritime prohibition") laws, all overseas trade were to be conducted through the so-called tributary trade, where foreign states presented tributes to the Chinese court and received gifts as a sign of imperial favour in return. Fuzhou and Quanzhou were designated as the officials seaports for this trade, but as tributary trade was tightly controlled by the government, it was inadequate to the demands of the markets, both domestic and foreign. Eventually Fujianese smugglers converged at the comparatively remote port of Yuegang ("Moon Harbour") in southern Fujian, so named because of its crescent-shaped harbour. By the beginning the 14th century, merchants were recorded to be building multi-masted oceangoing vessels in Yuegang to go to Ryukyu Islands and Southeast Asia, flouting the maritime prohibitions.

Foreign goods flowed into Yuegang while Jingdezhen porcelain with Islamic designs were exported to Southeast Asian markets. Soon kilns were set up in nearby Zhangzhou to take advantage of the accessible maritime trade route, giving rise to the export porcelain known as Zhangzhou ware at a time when Jingdezhen suffered a temporary decline since it could not keep up with the pace that the market demanded. In the early 16th century, Europeans starting with the Portuguese joined this trade at Yuegang, and the Yuegang merchants were noted to be using Portuguese firearms as early as 1533. The flourishing trade earned Yuegang the nickname "Little Suhang", a reference to the great metropolises of Suzhou and Hangzhou.

As other smuggling ports like Shuangyu further up the coast were shut down by the Ming army in the late 1540s, Yuegang, being relatively unscathed by the pirate suppression campaigns, gradually thrived as the primary Chinese port of the overseas smuggling trade. In the early 1560s, it was recorded that the Yuegang port was home to up to 200 oceangoing vessels.

== Legal trade ==
As the pirate suppression campaigns went on, some Ming officials examined the roots of piracy and determined that the harsh maritime prohibition laws were effectively forcing the coastal populace into piracy by criminalizing their commercial livelihoods. By relaxing the prohibition, they argued, the government could tax the maritime trade and eliminate one of the causes of piracy, and the tax revenues could further fund efforts to combat actual piracy. Officials petitioned to establish a new administrative county at Yuegang in the early 1520s, the 1540s, and the 1560s along this line of reasoning, and finally succeeded after the death of the hardliner Jiajing Emperor. On 17 January 1567, the Haicheng County was established at Yuegang, and it was here that the maritime prohibition laws were relaxed, making Yuegang the only port where private overseas trade was legal. With this, along with the suppression of the lingering piracy in the area by general Yu Dayou in 1569, Yuegang was converted from a pirate den to an official trading port.

The legalization of trade at Yuegang was well-timed, since the Spanish began to take possession of the Philippines in 1565 and Yuegang merchants sailing to Manila found it a bustling port dealing goods from New Spain. Beginning from 1573, Chinese silks and porcelain were carried across the Pacific Ocean by the Manila galleons, while New World crops and precious metals from the Americas returned via the galleons and were brought to China by the Yuegang merchants, resulting in a number of drastic changes in Chinese society. Many staples of the modern Chinese diet, like the sweet potato, maize, and tomato were first introduced to China through the Yuegang trade. Tobacco also came to China via Yuegang, inaugurating the custom of smoking in China. Silver traded from Spanish Philippines through the Manila-Acapulco Galleon Trade, minted in New Spain (Mexico), mined in Potosí (Bolivia) circulated in China through Yuegang in the form of Spanish silver dollar coins and the influx of silver reinvigorated the Chinese silverware industry. Architecturally, Yuegang and its surrounding areas were noticeably transformed by the foreign trade as Chinese buildings utilizing red bricks in the Roman-Islamic style appeared in the late Ming dynasty. The Daiwei village (埭尾) south of Yuegang, noted for its concentration of more than 60 brick-and-mortar buildings of similar size and orientation, represents an example of the hybridization of the Chinese courtyard dwelling style and western red brick masonry technique as a result of globalization via the Yuegang trade.

== Decline ==
While the legalization of trade put a stop to the smuggling trade, the concentration of wealth in southern Fujian resulted in the rise of the merchant-pirate Zheng Zhilong, who came to dominate the Taiwan Strait after consolidating the merchant and pirate groups along the Fujian coast. Zheng Zhilong based himself in the port of Anhai since 1630, and through his influence Anhai prospered at the expense of the officially-sanctioned Yuegang port. When Zheng Zhilong surrendered to the Manchu invaders during the Ming-Qing transition, his son Zheng Chenggong (Koxinga) took control of his pirate consortium and remained loyal to the Ming dynasty. Yuegang came under the control of Koxinga and was relegated to a supply depot that forwarded taxes to his base of Xiamen.

In 1656, Koxinga's commander in Haicheng Huang Wu (黃梧) surrendered the city to the Qing dynasty, depriving Koxinga the port of Yuegang and years of supplies stocked there. Huang Wu further suggested to the Qing that the Zheng organization could be starved into disintegration if their maritime trade routes were cut off. The Shunzhi Emperor acted on the advice, banning all private maritime trade and travel on August 6 of that year. This ban did not accomplish much since the merchants in Qing-held territories merely continued trading through smuggling. This prompted an escalation to the Great Clearance edicts which mandated the evacuation of Haicheng county in 1660, relocating its residents to the interior. These edicts were harshly enforced, and the port was devastated. When the sea ban was lifted after the defeat of the Zheng kingdom in Taiwan in 1684, Xiamen, not Yuegang, was made the Qing dynasty's seaport of choice in Fujian. In 1727, Xiamen officially took Yuegang's previous status as Fujian's only official port where foreign trade was legal.

== See also ==
- Nan'ao One - shipwreck of a Chinese junk on the Yuegang-Manila route
- Kraak ware or Swatow ware - style of Chinese porcelain exported from Yuegang
