= Dadan Island =

Island in Fuchien, Republic of China

Native name: 大膽島
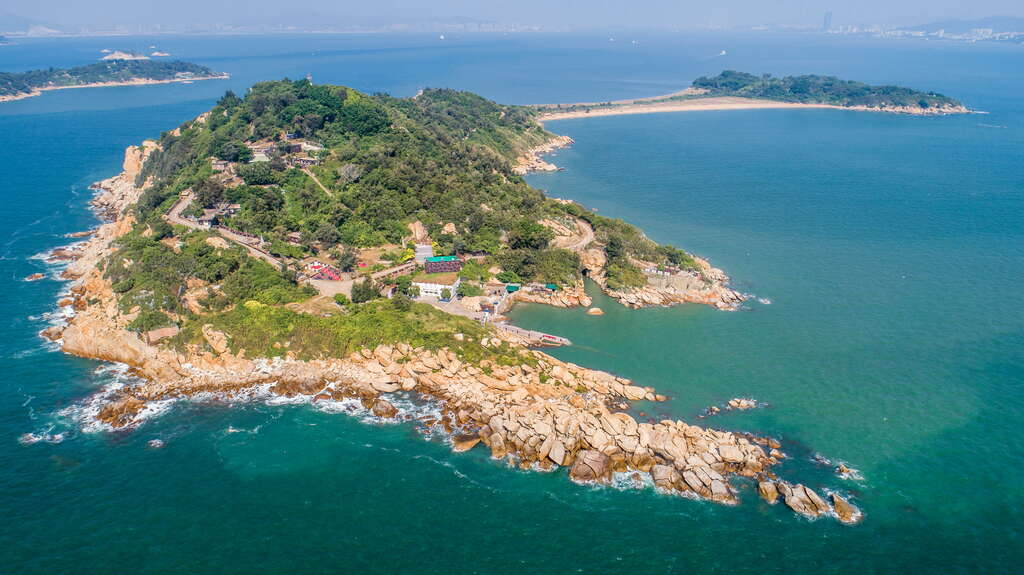

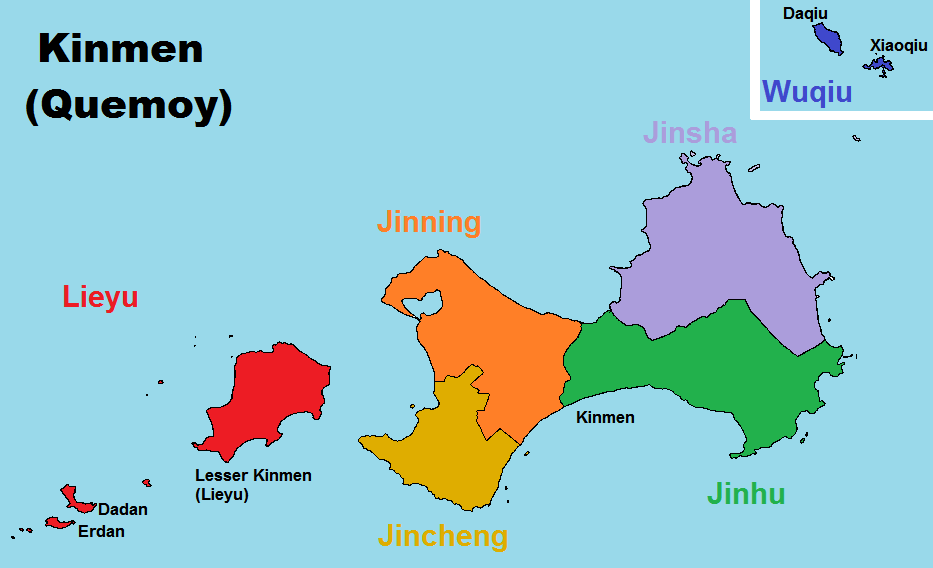
- Dadan Island in Kinmen County

- Location within Taiwan

Geography
- Location: Lieyu, Kinmen, Fuchien, Republic of China
- Coordinates: 24°23′25″N 118°09′56″E
- Area: 0.7900 km^{2} (0.3050 sq mi)
- Highest elevation: 98 m (322 ft)

Dadan Island (Tatan, Taitan Island, Tae-tan/Taetan) (Chinese: 大膽島; pinyin: Dàdǎn Dǎo; Pe̍h-ōe-jī: tōa-táⁿ tó; lit. 'Island of Boldness', originally 大擔島) is an island in Lieyu Township, Kinmen County, Fuchien Province, Republic of China (Taiwan). The island is in the Taiwan Strait, along the coast of Mainland China. It is located approximately 12,000 m (7.5 mi) to the southwest of Lesser Kinmen (Lieyu) and approximately 4,400 m (2.7 mi) from Xiamen (Amoy).

== History ==
In March 1853, HMS Rattler struck a sunken rock at Amoy, China and was severely damaged. She was beached at Tae-tan (Dadan) for repairs.

Since 1949, Dadan Island has several times become the battlefront of conflicts between the People's Liberation Army and the Republic of China Armed Forces.

On July 26, 1950, ROC forces on the island, in total 298 soldiers, repulsed an attack (大擔島戰役) from a People's Liberation Army force of 700 soldiers that landed on the island.

In October 1951, Chiang Ching-kuo visited the island and gave the island its current name.

External image
- Declassified nuclear strike plan shows geographical relativity between Dadan, Xiamen & Lieyu

Chinese Nationalist spokesmen reported that Chinese Communists shelled Dadan and Erdan between June 26–28, 1957. At that time, Chinese Nationalist strength on the islands was around 1,100 men.

On May 9–10, 2002, President Chen Shui-bian visited Dadan (Tatan) and delivered remarks concerning Cross-Strait relations.

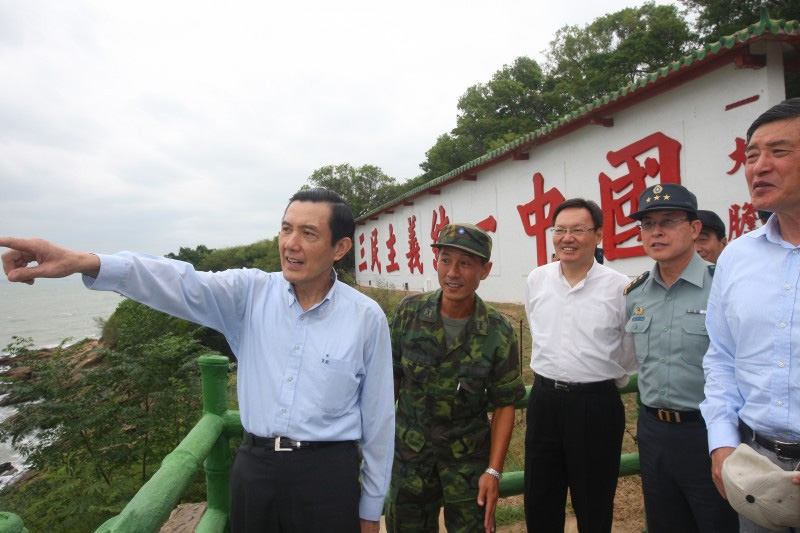
President Ma Ying-jeou visits Dadan Island

On 30 June 2014, the control of the island and surrounding islets was handed over from the Republic of China Armed Forces to the civilian under the Coast Guard Administration of Kinmen County Government.

From 26 July until 31 October 2018, the island was opened to the public on trial basis which attracted 3,000 people in total. On 1 March 2019, the island was officially opened for tourism. A maximum of 150 people can visit the island on a given day and sight-seers must apply for permission to visit ten days before their visit. Residents of mainland China, Hong Kong and Macau are prohibited from visiting the island.

In July 2024 the Kinmen County Government said tours to the island would resume on a trial basis.

== Geography ==
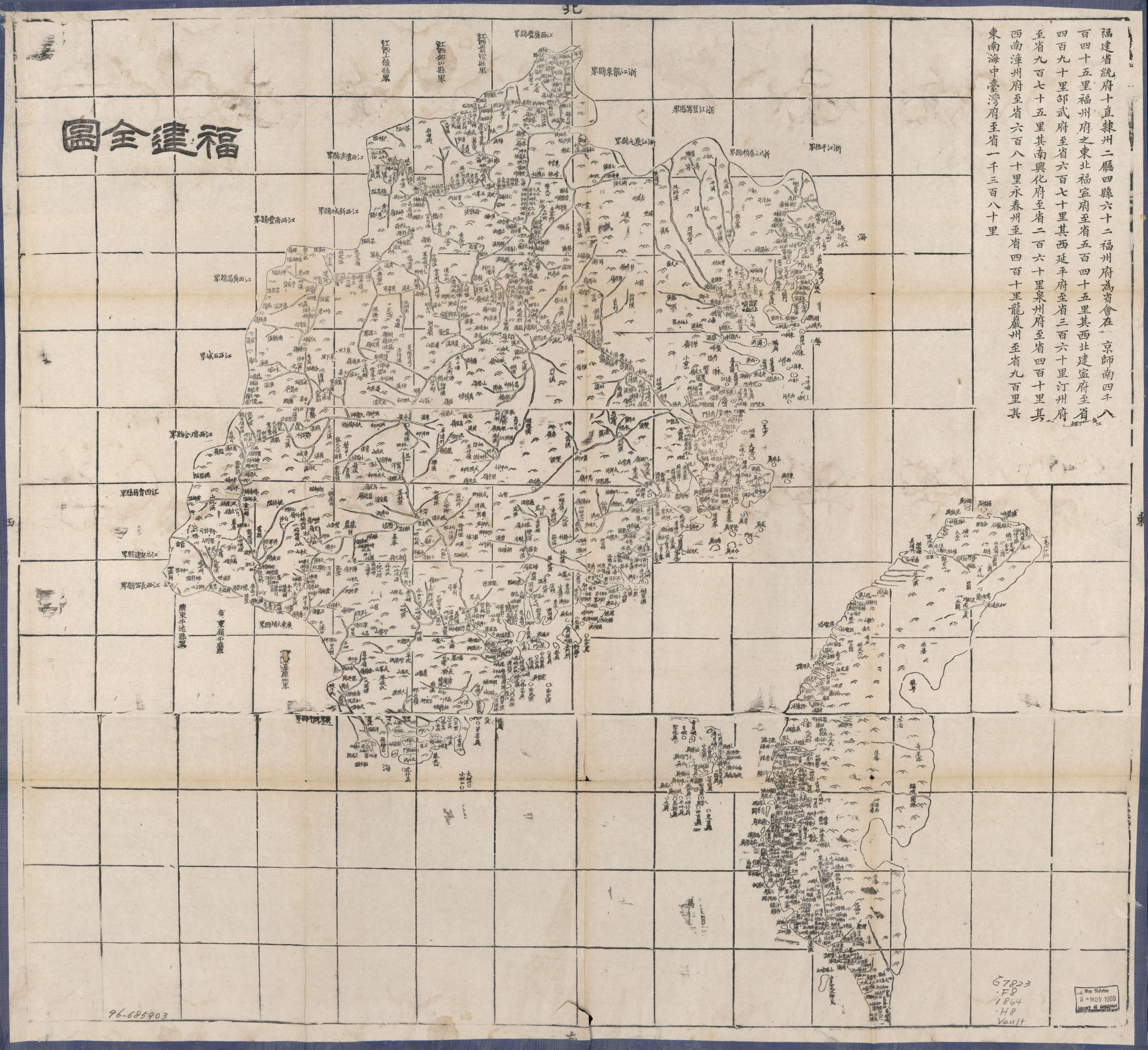
Dadan Island (labelled 大担㠘)

The total surface area of Dadan Island is 0.79 km^{2} (0.31 sq mi). The northern and southern part of the island are more elevated than its central area, which contains a strip of sandy beach. Mountains on the island include Beishan ('north mountain', Mt. Beishan; 北山) which reaches 45 m (148 ft) above sea level, Mt. Xiaohu ('little tiger mountain', Mt. Siaohu; 小虎山) which reaches 34 m (112 ft) above sea level, and Nanshan ('south mountain', Mt. Nanshan; 南山) which reaches 98 m (322 ft) above sea level.

Erdan Island is 800 m (2,600 ft) from Dadan Island at the closest point.

Dadan Island is the largest of a small group of islets which also includes Erdan Island, Sandan Island (三擔島), Sidan Island (四擔島), Wudan Island (五擔島), Menghu Islet, etc. They sit astride the entrance into the Xiamen (Amoy) Harbor from the Taiwan Strait.

The islands of Wu Yu and Qing Yu in Gangwei, Longhai City, Zhangzhou, Fujian, China are located to the south of Dadan Island.

== Sights ==
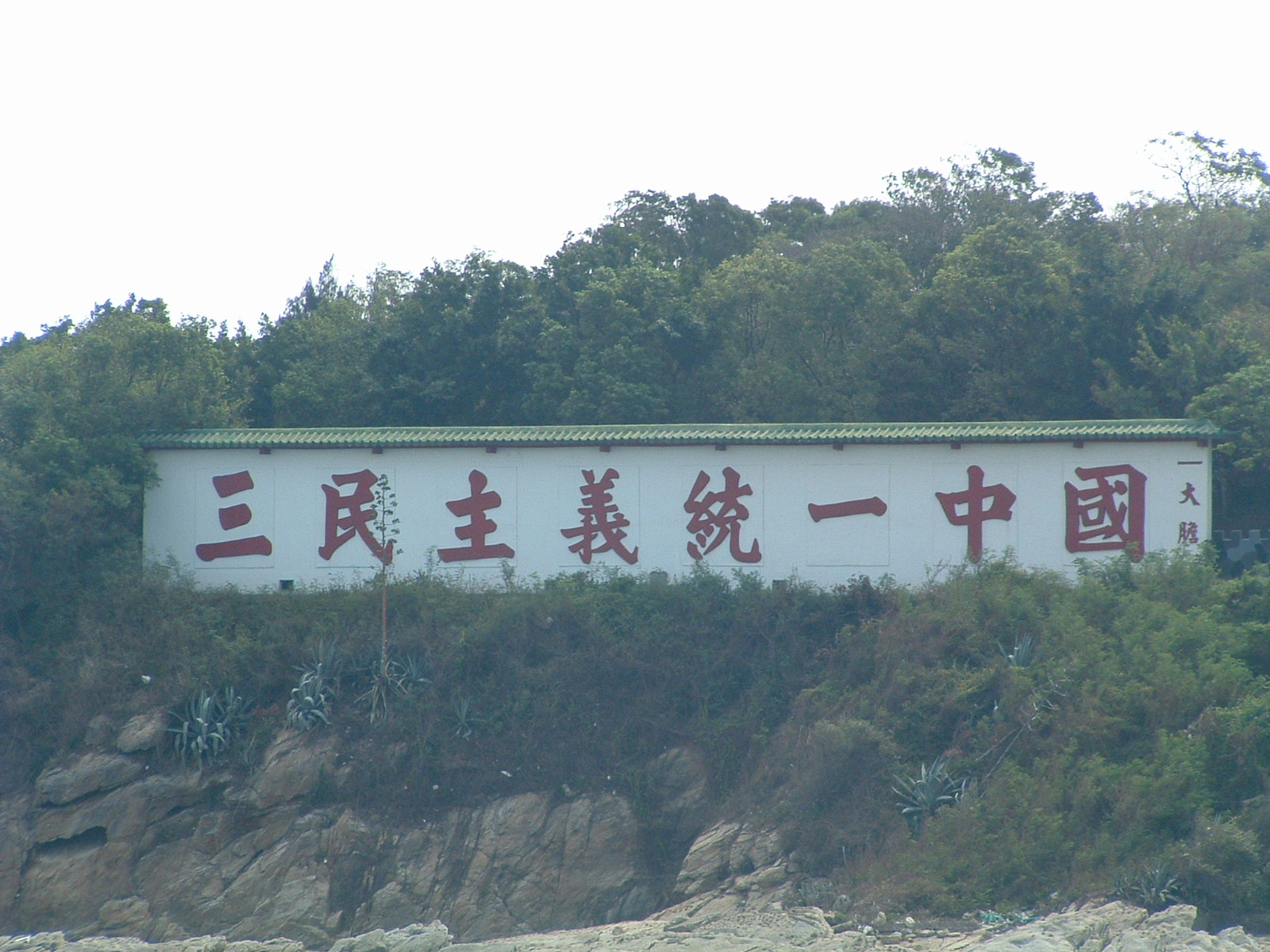
The slogan "Three Principles of the People unite China" on a defensive position facing mainland China.

- Dadan's Southern and Eastern lighthouses were constructed at the same time. However, due to the August 23 ("823") Artillery barrage by the PLA, all that is left are their respective foundations.
- There are two temples located on Dadan island. One in the north and one in the south.
- "Three Principles of the People Unite China" Slogan Wall is founded by General Zhao Wan-fu on the North of the island in August 1986, deposed after Lieyu Massacre next year.
- The Tomb of General Mingwei is the tomb of Liu Long-chang, Governor General of the Navy in the Early Qing Dynasty who resigned and retired to Dadan Island

== See also ==
- Erdan Island
- List of islands of Taiwan
