= Menghu Islet =

Islet west of Taiwan

Coordinates: 24°23′50.8″N 118°11′33.48″E

Native name: 猛虎嶼 (Chinese)
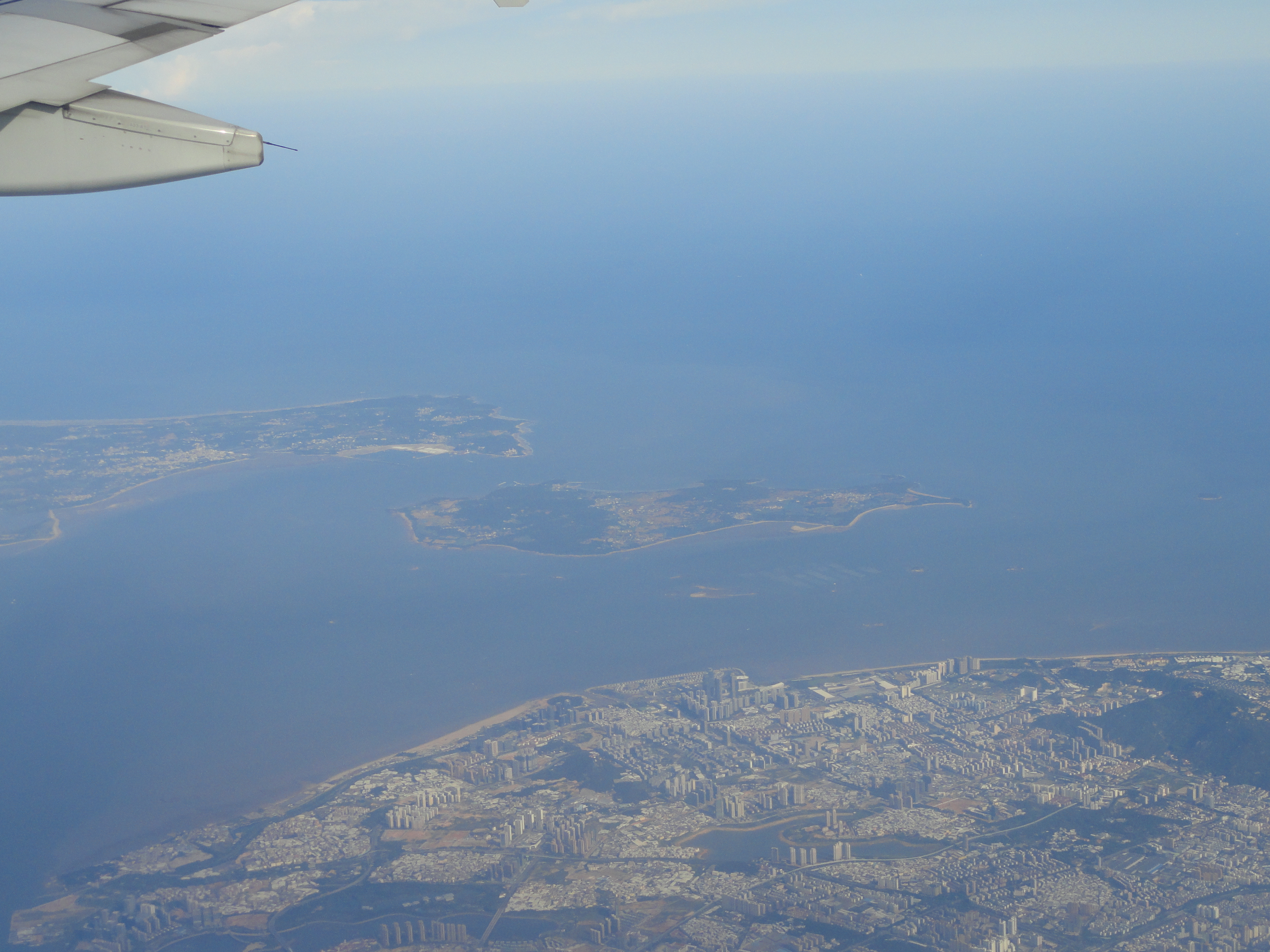
- Menghu Islet (far right), south of Lesser Kinmen (Lieyu)
- Interactive map of Menghu Islet

Geography
- Location: south of Lesser Kinmen / Lieyu in Lieyu Township, Kinmen County (Quemoy), Fujian, Republic of China (Taiwan)
- Area: 0.0250 km^{2} (0.0097 sq mi)

Administration
- Republic of China (Taiwan)
- Province: Fujian
- County: Kinmen (Quemoy)
- Rural Township: Lieyu

Additional information
- Time zone: National Standard Time (UTC+8)

Location of Menghu Islet

Menghu Islet (Chinese: 猛虎嶼; pinyin: Měnghǔ Yǔ; Pe̍h-ōe-jī: bíng-hóo-sū) (Tiger Island) is an islet located southwest of Lesser Kinmen (Lieyu) in Lieyu Township, Kinmen County (Quemoy), Fujian Province, Republic of China (Taiwan). The islet was originally named Hu-tzu Hsü (Hu-tzu Hsu) (虎仔嶼).

== History ==
External image
- Declassified nuclear strike plan reveals strategic importance of Menghu's position in history

In 1965, the island was given its present name.

In 2006, a Chinese fishing ship carrying 198 Chinese box turtles for illicit sale in Fujian was caught in the waters adjacent to Menghu Islet.

On November 3, 2017, a fishing ship with five crew members from Longhai City, Zhangzhou, Fujian, China was caught in the waters adjacent to Menghu Islet.

On July 23, 2019, Ho Cheng (賀政), the new leader of the ROC Army Kinmen Defense Command (陸軍金門防衛指揮部), visited the soldiers on Shi Islet and Menghu Islet.

After 10 PM on August 14, 2019, two members of the Kinmen branch of the Coast Guard Administration (Taiwan) were severely injured when they jumped from their ship onto a fishing ship from Mainland China which had been caught fishing in the waters around Menghu Islet.

== Geography ==
Menghu Islet is 3.7 km (2.3 mi) southwest of Lesser Kinmen (Lieyu).

== See also ==
- List of islands of Taiwan
- Tiger in Chinese culture
