= Jiulong River =

River in Fujian, China

Coordinates: 24.595207°N 117.818069°E

Jiulong Longjiang, Zhangjiang
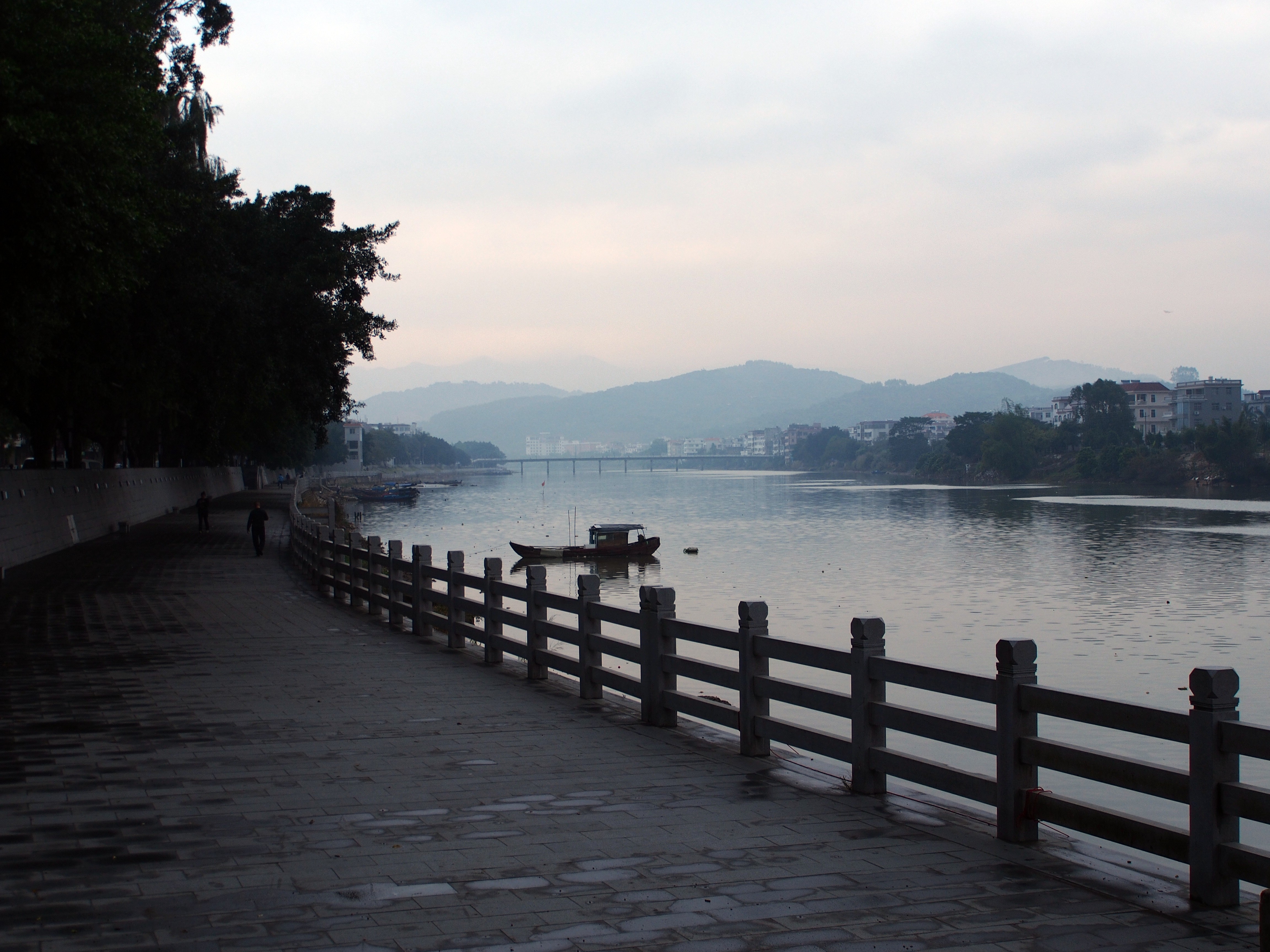
- The bank of the Jiulang River in Zhangzhou
- Native name: Jiǔlóng Jiāng (Chinese)

Location
- Country: China
- Provinces: Fujian

Physical characteristics
- Length: 258 km (160 mi)

Jiulong River
- Traditional Chinese: 九龍江
- Simplified Chinese: 九龙江
- Literal meaning: Nine-Dragon River
Transcriptions
Standard Mandarin
- Hanyu Pinyin: Jiǔlóng Jiāng
Southern Min
- Hokkien POJ: Kiú-liông-kang

Beixi
- Chinese: 北溪
- Literal meaning: North Creek
Transcriptions
Standard Mandarin
- Hanyu Pinyin: Běixī
Southern Min
- Hokkien POJ: Pak-khoe

Xixi
- Chinese: 西溪
- Literal meaning: West Creek
Transcriptions
Standard Mandarin
- Hanyu Pinyin: Xīxī
Southern Min
- Hokkien POJ: Sai-khoe

Former names

Longjiang
- Traditional Chinese: 龍江
- Simplified Chinese: 龙江
- Literal meaning: Dragon River
Transcriptions
Standard Mandarin
- Hanyu Pinyin: Lóngjiāng
Southern Min
- Hokkien POJ: Liông-kang

Former names

Zhangjiang
- Traditional Chinese: 漳江
- Simplified Chinese: 漳江
Transcriptions
Southern Min
- Hokkien POJ: Chiang-kang

The Jiulong River, formerly known as the Longjiang (Note: This name was formerly romanized Lung Keang or Kiang.) or Zhangjiang, is the largest river in southern Fujian and the second largest in the province. It has a length of 258 kilometers (160 mi) and a basin of 14,700 square kilometers (5,700 sq mi). Like all Fujianese rivers but one, it flows into the Taiwan Strait.

== Course ==
The Beixi rises in the prefecture of Longyan; it flows east into the prefecture of Zhangzhou, where it merges with the Xixi to form the Jiulong. The Xixi, almost as long, begins in Zhangzhou's rural Pinghe County. The combined stream flows past the urban districts of Zhangzhou and Xiamen. Finally, it empties into Xiamen Bay on the Taiwan Strait.

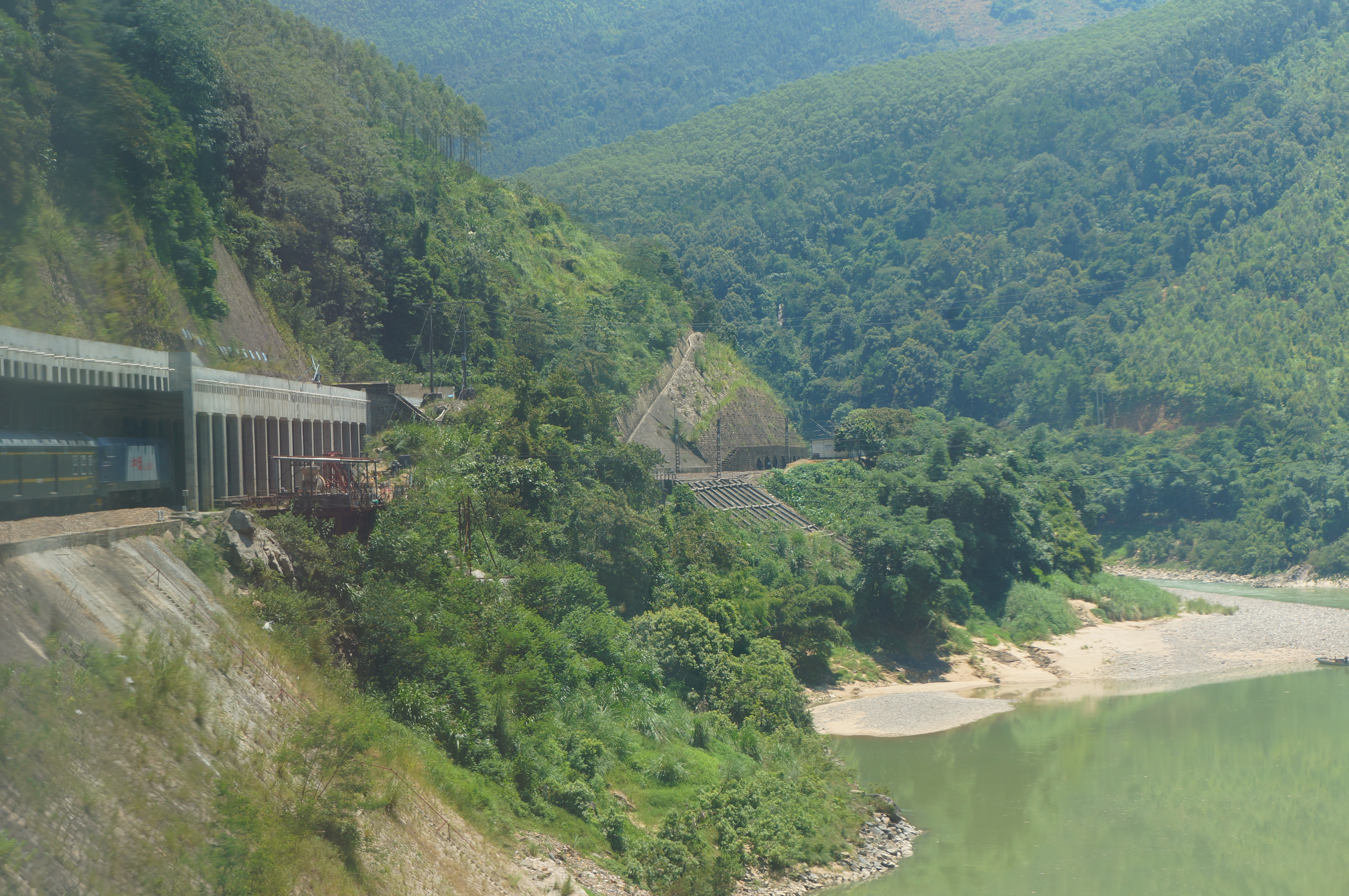
Jiulong River near Yingtan-Xiamen Railway line in Hua'an

Gallery
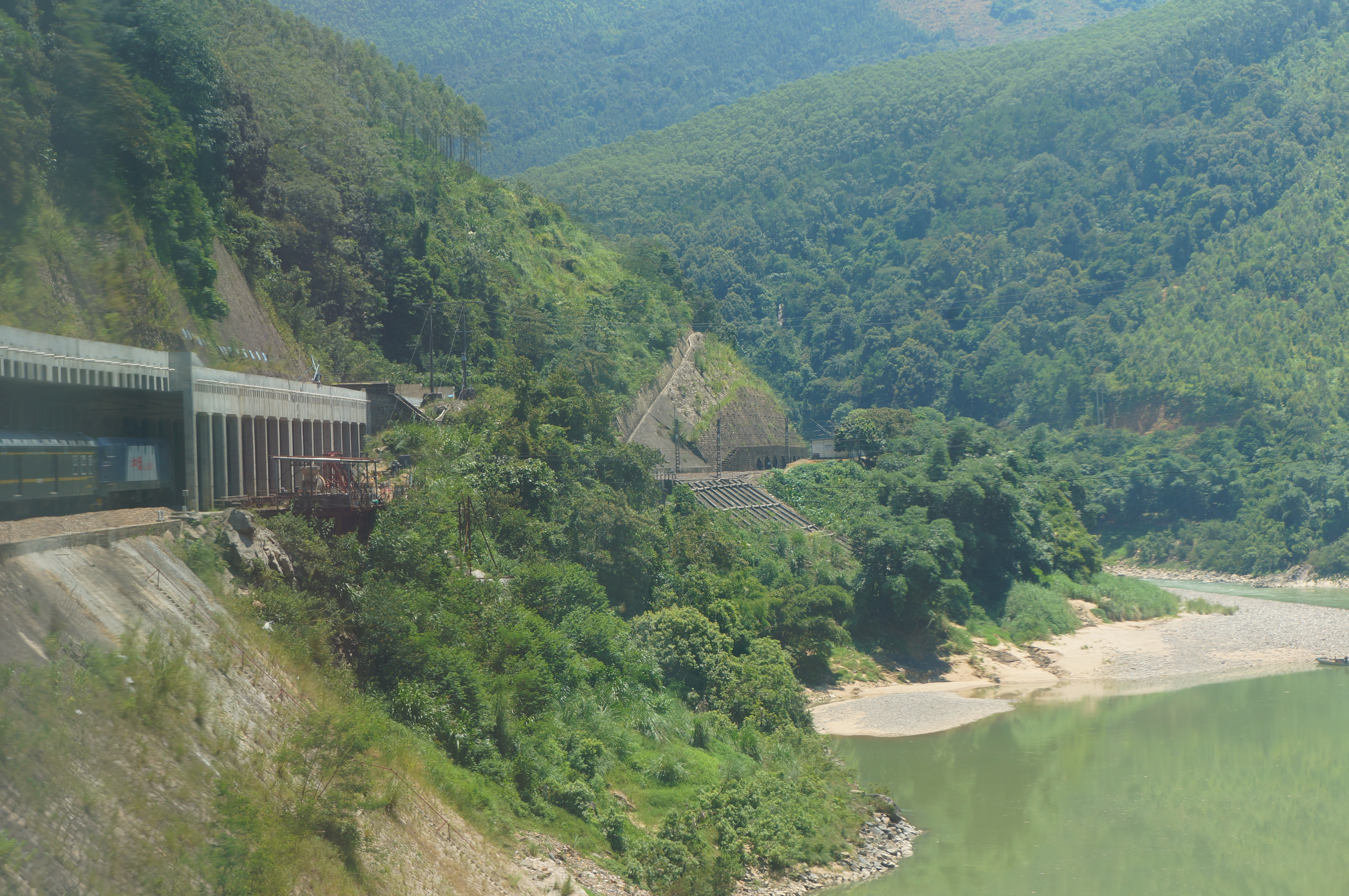
Jiulong River near Yingtan-Xiamen Railway line in Hua'an

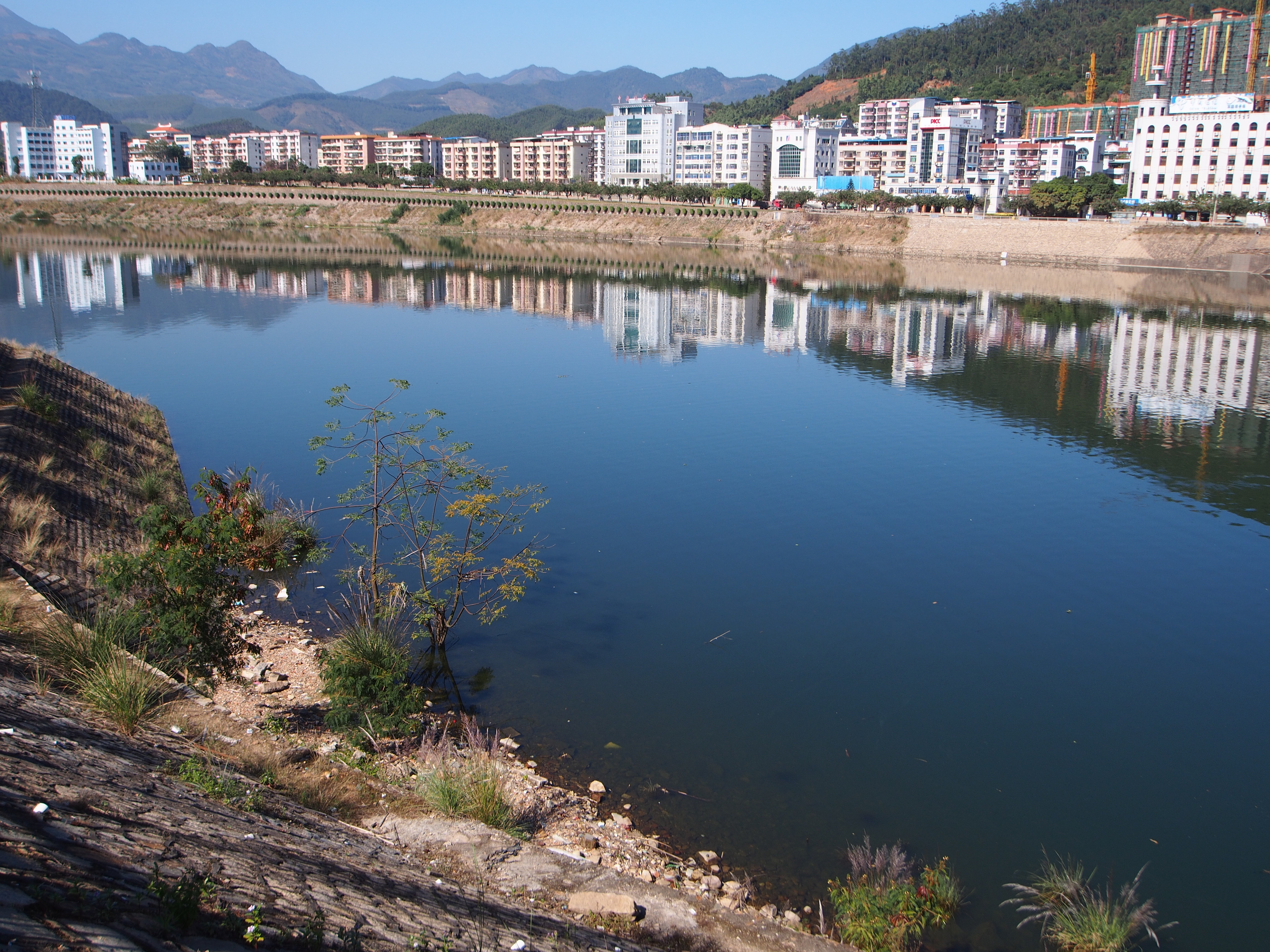
North branch of the river

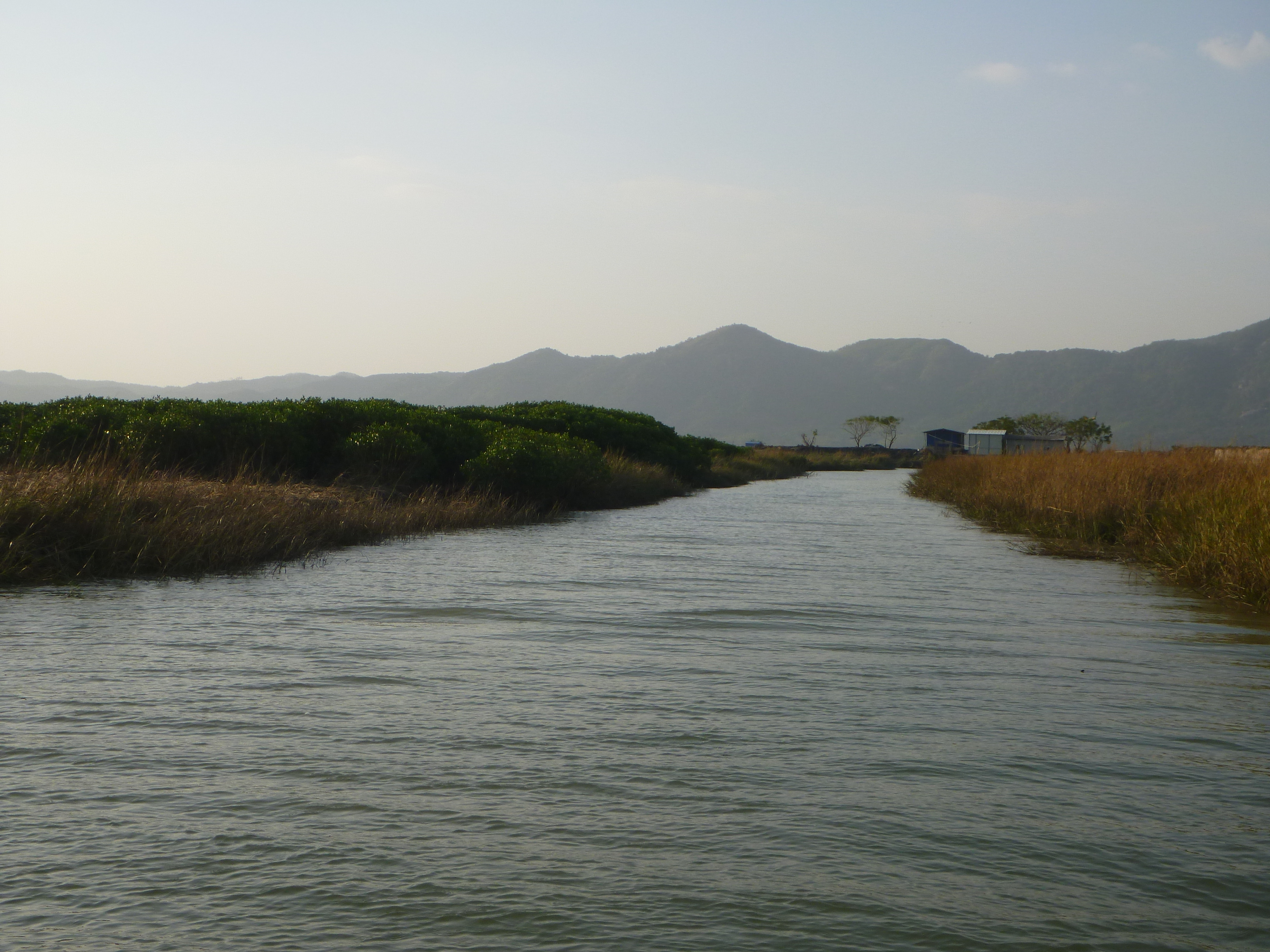
Island in the river's estuary

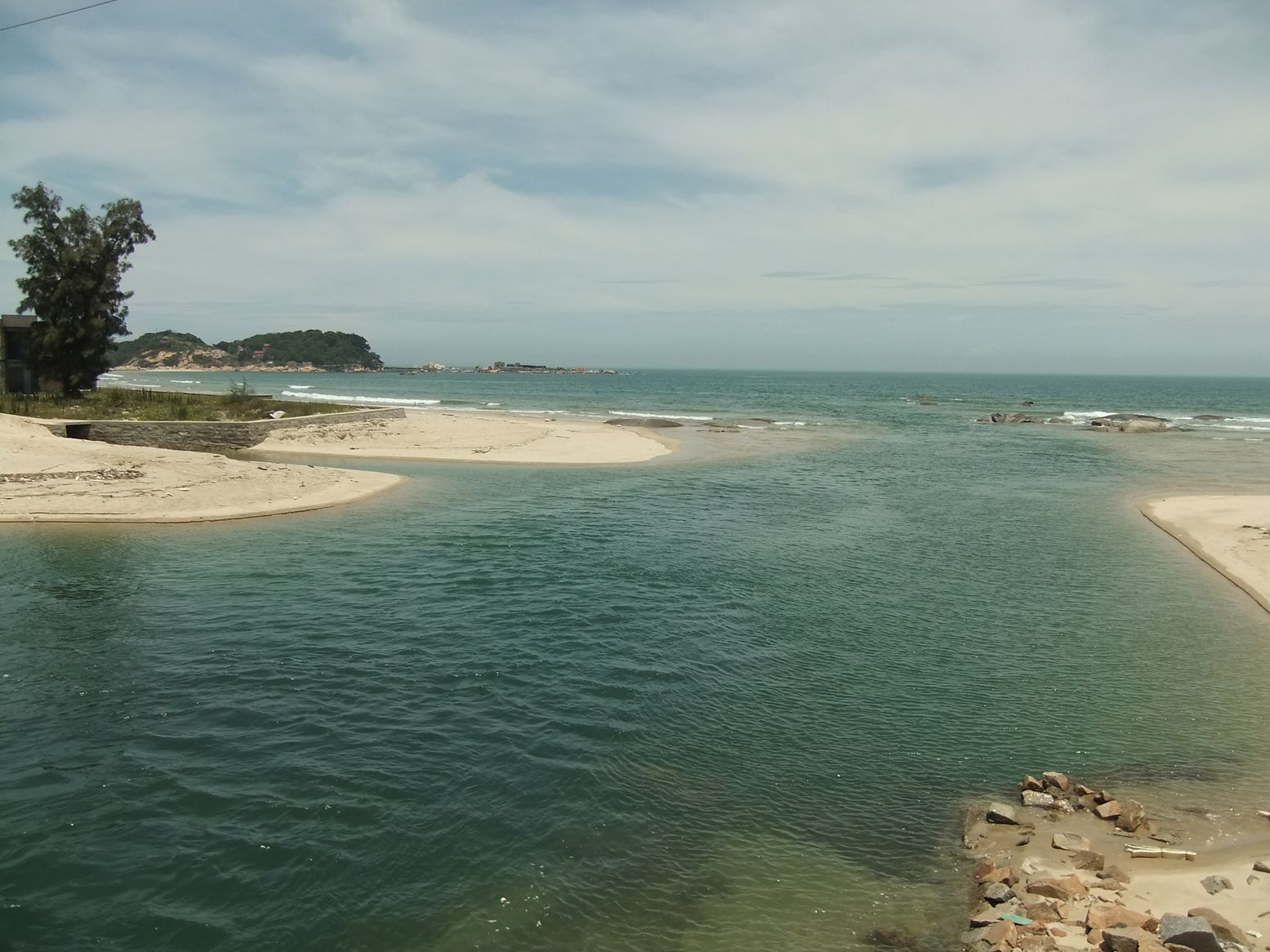
Mouth of the River

== See also ==
- Yuegang, a smuggling port at the mouth of the river
