= Beihai Tunnel =

Beihai Tunnel may refer to:

- Beihai Tunnel (Beigan)
- Beihai Tunnel (Nangan)
- Beihai Tunnel (Dongyin)
