= Maoshan Pagoda =

Pagoda in Jincheng, Kinmen, Taiwan

- 茅山塔
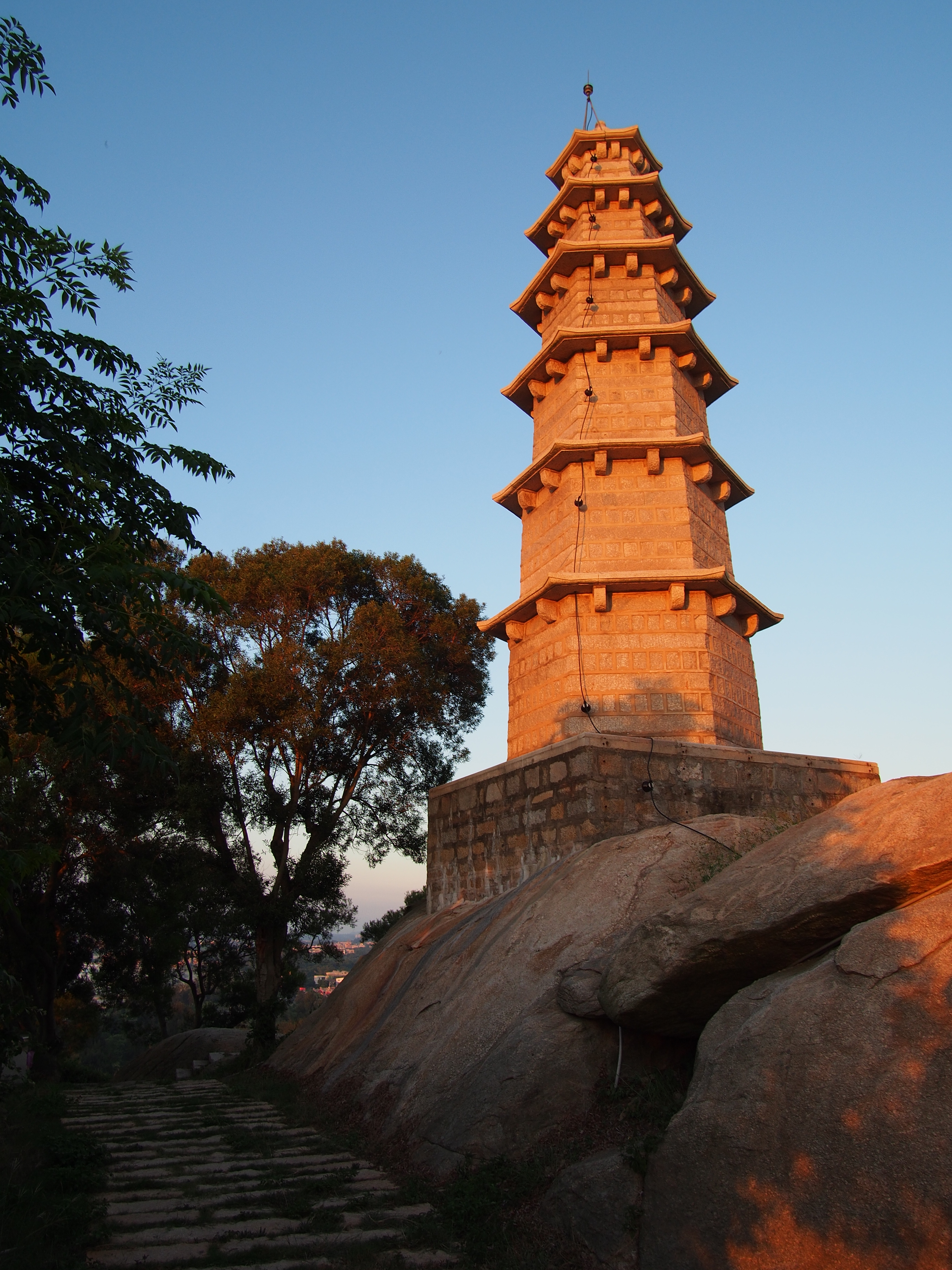

- Taiwan

Location
- Location: Jincheng, Kinmen, Taiwan
- Interactive map of Maoshan Pagoda
- Coordinates: 24°24′31″N 118°17′17.9″E

Architecture
- Type: pagoda
- Height (max): 11.25 m

The Maoshan Pagoda (Chinese: 茅山塔; pinyin: Máoshān Tǎ; Pe̍h-ōe-jī: Gê-soaⁿ Thah), or also known as Jinguishan Pagoda, is a pagoda in Jincheng Township, Kinmen County, Taiwan. It is located on the west side of Kinmen old city and the south of Maoshan, Shuitou Village.

== History ==
=== Ming Dynasty ===
During the 14th century, pirate activities were growing around the shore of Ming Dynasty. Ming official who was stationed in Kinmen established Maoshan Pagoda and other two pagodas as lighthouses to protect Kinmen and guide ships.

=== Republic of China ===
In 1958, the pagoda formed a barrier against the People's Liberation Army during the 823 Artillery War. In 2004, the pagoda was reconstructed by the government based on its historical records and remains.

== Architecture ==
The pagoda stands at a height of 11.25 meters.

== See also ==
- Longfeng Temple, Jinsha Township
- Wentai Pagoda
