= KFRI =

KFRI may refer to:

- Kerala Forest Research Institute (KFRI), a research organisation based in Thrissur, Kerala, India
- KFRI (FM), a radio station (88.1 FM) licensed to Stanton, Texas, United States
- Kinmen Fisheries Research Institute, government agenvy in Kinmen, Taiwan
- the ICAO code for Marshall Army Airfield
