= Juguang =

Juguang (Wade–Giles: Chü-kuang) may refer to:

- Juguang, Lienchiang (莒光鄉), Republic of China (Taiwan)
- Juguang Tower a tower in Jincheng Township, Kinmen County, Republic of China (Taiwan)
- Wanda-Zhonghe-Shulin line, an under construction line of the Taipei Metro which will have a branch line possibly named Juguang branch line.

== See also ==
- Jiuguang, a Chinese department store chain
