= Wentai Pagoda =

Pagoda in Jincheng, Kinmen, Taiwan

- 文臺寶塔
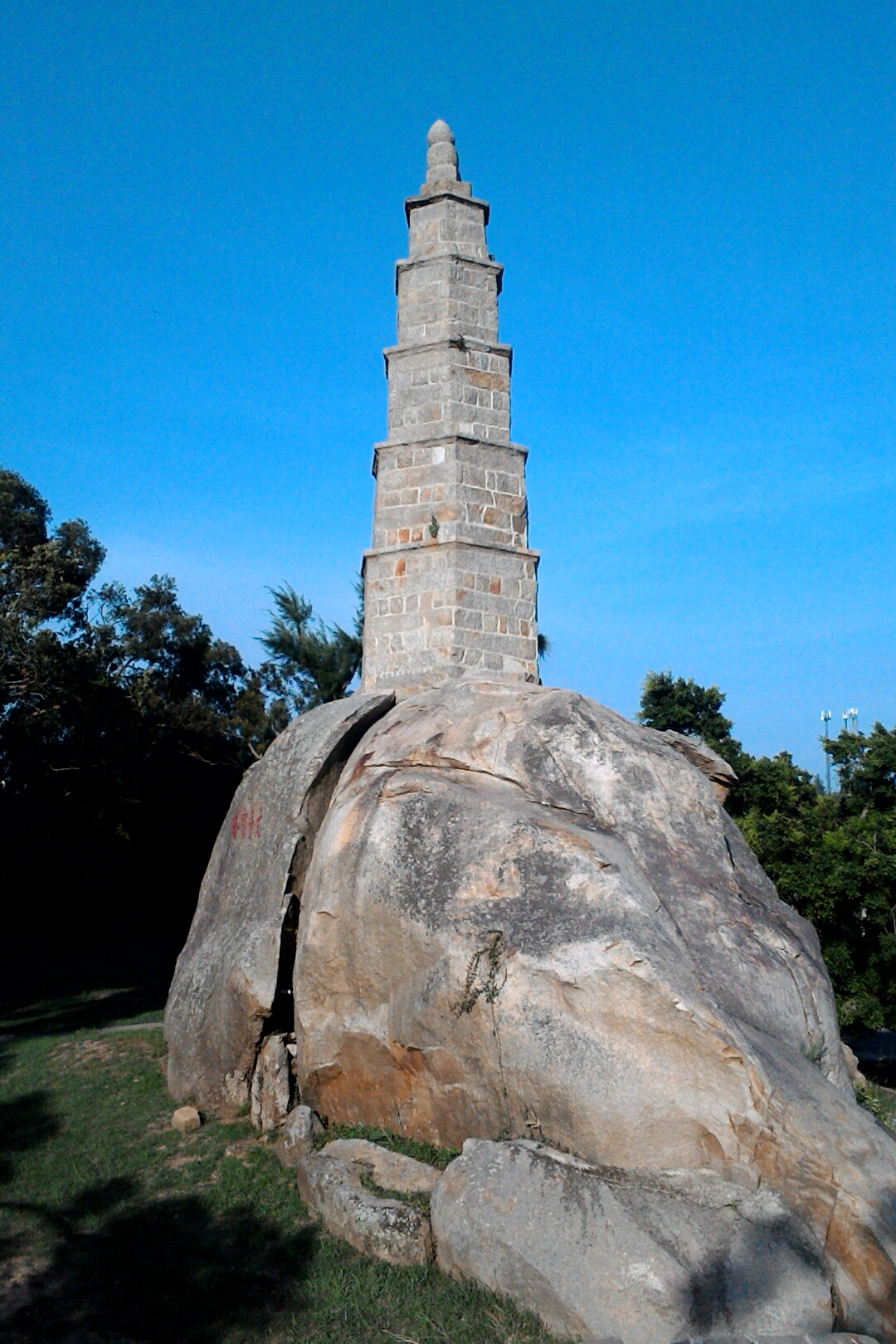

- Taiwan

Location
- Location: Jincheng, Kinmen, Taiwan
- Interactive map of Wentai Pagoda
- Coordinates: 24°25′00.1″N 118°18′59.9″E

Architecture
- Architect: Marquess Chianghsia Chou Te-hsing
- Type: pagoda
- Completed: 1387

The Wentai Pagoda (traditional Chinese: 文臺寶塔; simplified Chinese: 文台宝塔; pinyin: Wéntái Bǎotǎ; Pe̍h-ōe-jī: Bûn-tâi Pó-thah) is a pagoda in Gucheng Village, Jincheng Township, Kinmen County, Taiwan. The pagoda is a tower of feng shui erected for worshiping star and its incarnation.

== History ==
The pagoda was built in 1387 during the 20th year of Hongwu Emperor of Ming Dynasty by Marquess Chianghsia Chou Te-hsing. It was built to serve as navigational marker for ships negotiating the treacherous waters near Kinmen and also for defense of Kinmen from the Japanese pirates. The tower is classified as second grade national historic relic. The tower was damaged during an earthquake in 1918 and also in 1961 due to war.

== Architecture ==
The pagoda is a five-level hexagon granite building. Its peak features carvings and relief works and the stone on its base exhibits Chinese calligraphy written by Ming scholar Chen Hui and contemporary artist Chang Ta-chien.

== Transportation ==
The pagoda is accessible by bus or taxi west from Kinmen Airport.

== See also ==
- Longfeng Temple, Jinsha Township
- List of temples in Taiwan
- Religion in Taiwan
