= Gugang Lake =

Lake in Jincheng, Kinmen, Taiwan

- 古崗湖 (Chinese)
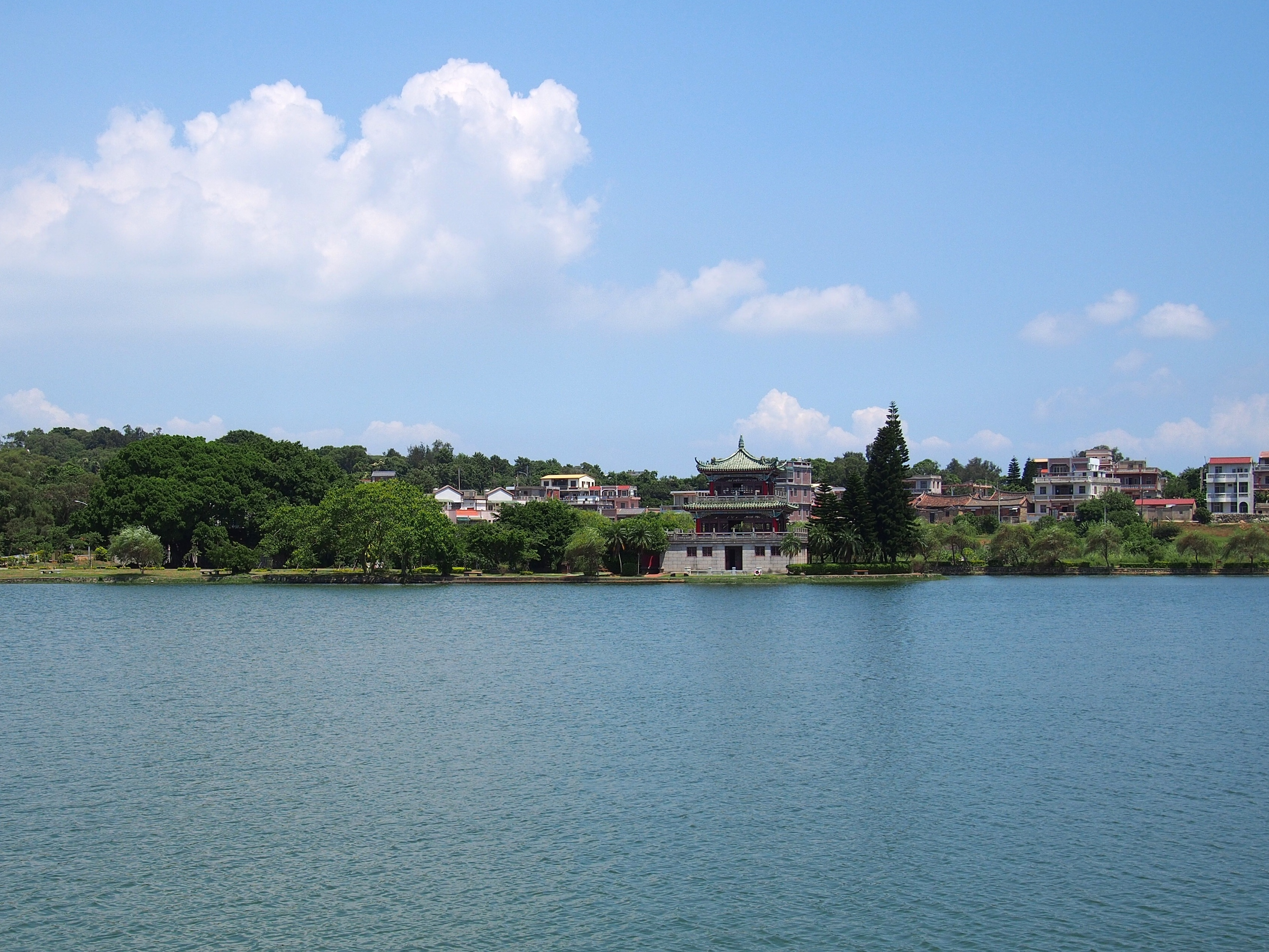

- Republic of China (Taiwan)
- Location: Jincheng, Kinmen, Fuchien, Republic of China
- Coordinates: 24°23′39.4″N 118°18′55.9″E
- Type: lake

The Gugang Lake (Chinese: 古崗湖; pinyin: Gǔgǎng Hú) is a natural lake in Jincheng Township, Kinmen County, Fuchien Province, Republic of China.

== Geology ==
The lake is surrounded by hills and willows growing on its shore. It is the habitat for aquatic birds, especially the European hoopoes.

== Features ==
The lake features the Gugang Pavilion and Tower (古崗樓) which was built in 1964 by Zhuang Wu-nan from Tamsui, Taipei after ten months of construction works. The pavilion is 16 meters in height.

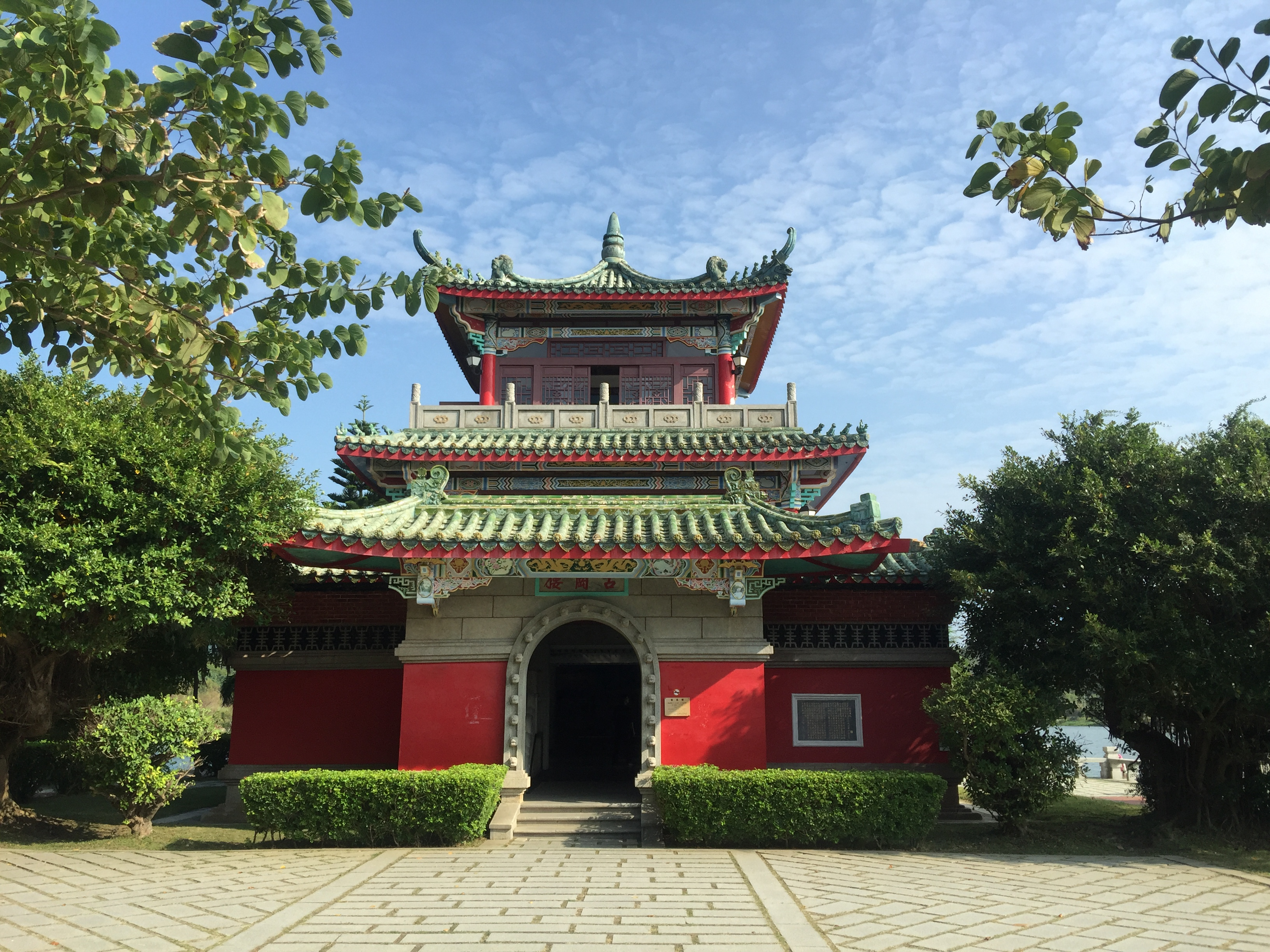
the Gugang Tower in Kinmen, Taiwan
