= Kinmen Military Headquarters of the Qing Dynasty =

Museum in Jincheng, Kingmen, Taiwan

- 清金門鎮總兵署
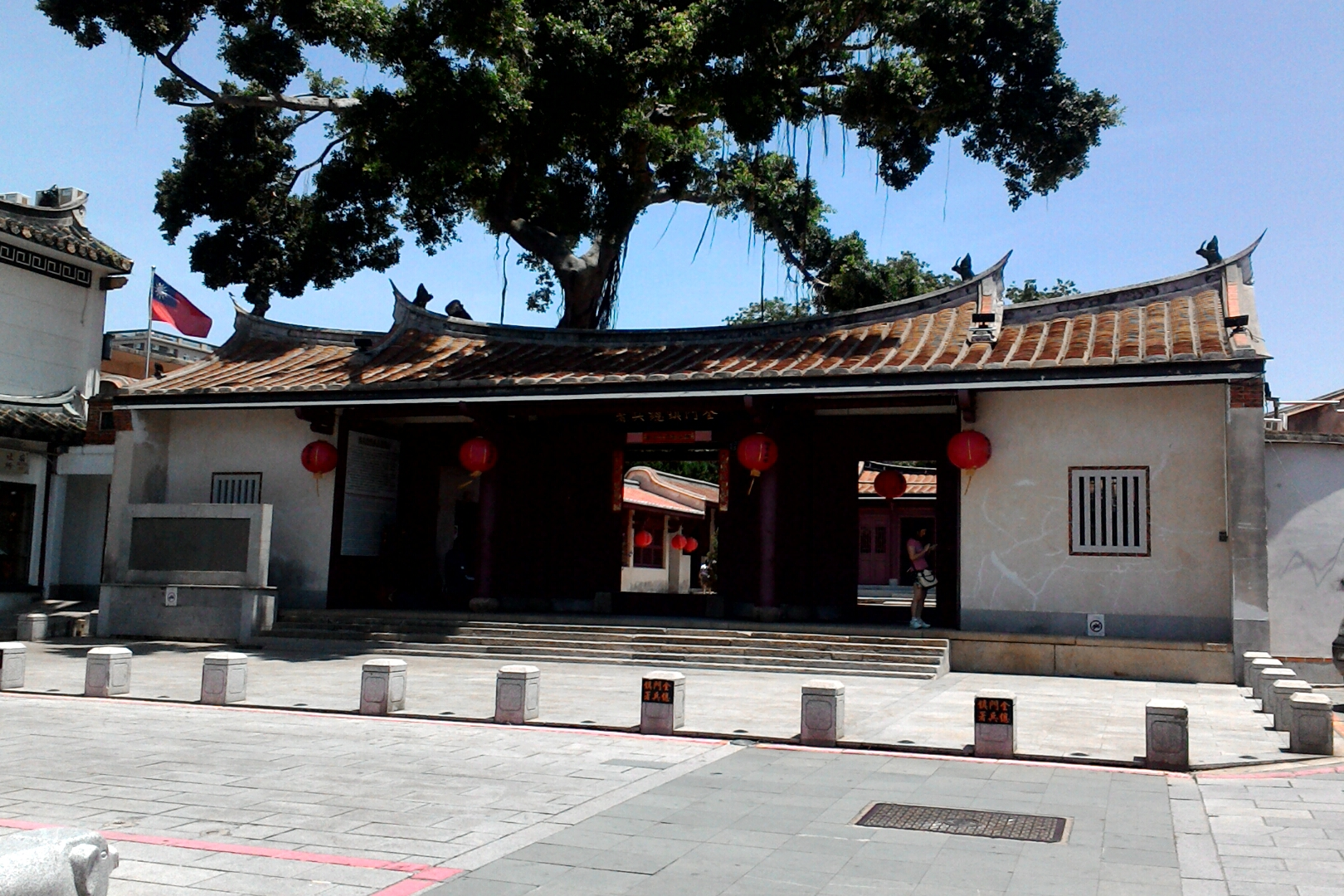
- Interactive map of the Kinmen Military Headquarters of the Qing Dynasty area

General information
- Type: Museum
- Location: Jincheng, Kinmen, Taiwan 24°25′56.2″N 118°19′05.8″E

Chinese name
- Traditional Chinese: 清金門鎮總兵署
- Simplified Chinese: 清金门镇总兵署
- Literal meaning: Qing Kinmen Town General Military Headquarters
Transcriptions
Standard Mandarin
- Hanyu Pinyin: Qīng Jīnménzhèn Zǒngbīngshǔ

The Kinmen Military Headquarters of the Qing Dynasty is a museum in Jincheng Township, Kinmen County, Fujian Province, Republic of China.

== History ==
The building was originally built as a study place for a scholar during the Ming dynasty under the name Cong Qing Xuan. It was then transformed into the Kinmen Military Headquarters during the rule of the Kangxi Emperor of the Qing dynasty when Commander of Kinmen relocated his office from Jinmencheng to Jincheng due to a situation change and loss of population in Jinmencheng.

After the establishment of the Republic of China in 1912, the office building had been used for several different purposes, from Kinmen County Government, Defense Headquarter, Fujian Provincial Government and Kinmen Political Committee during the Taiwan Strait Crisis. In 1995, the Kinmen County Police Department and Tentative County Assembly were relocated to other place.

== Architecture ==
The building is a four-section house with three courtyards in between. The front courtyard spans over a wide area with a Leafy Banyan trees. At the back lies the centuries-old ceiba tree.

== Gallery ==
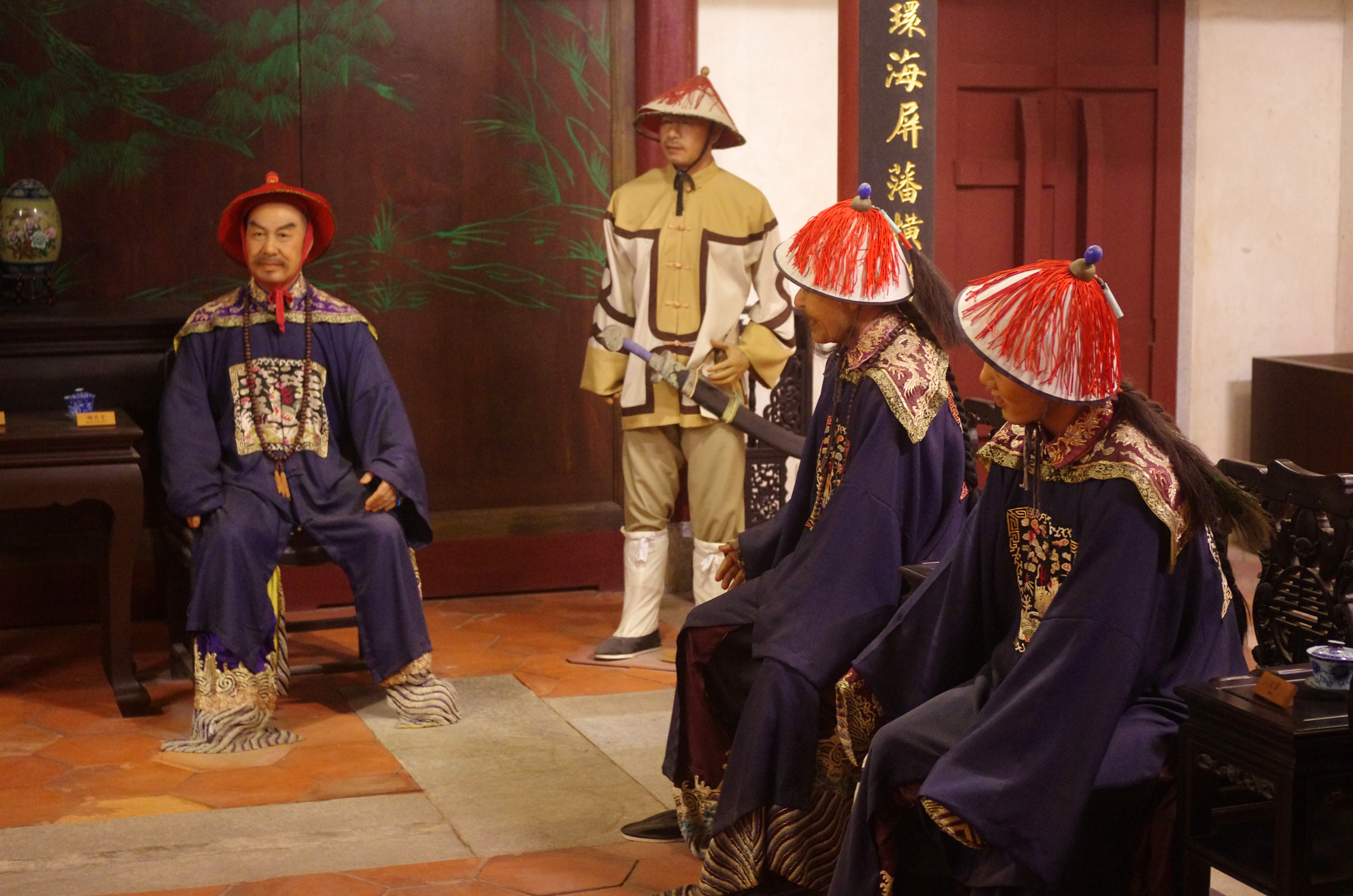
Wax figures depict a consultation between the military ruler and his subordinates.

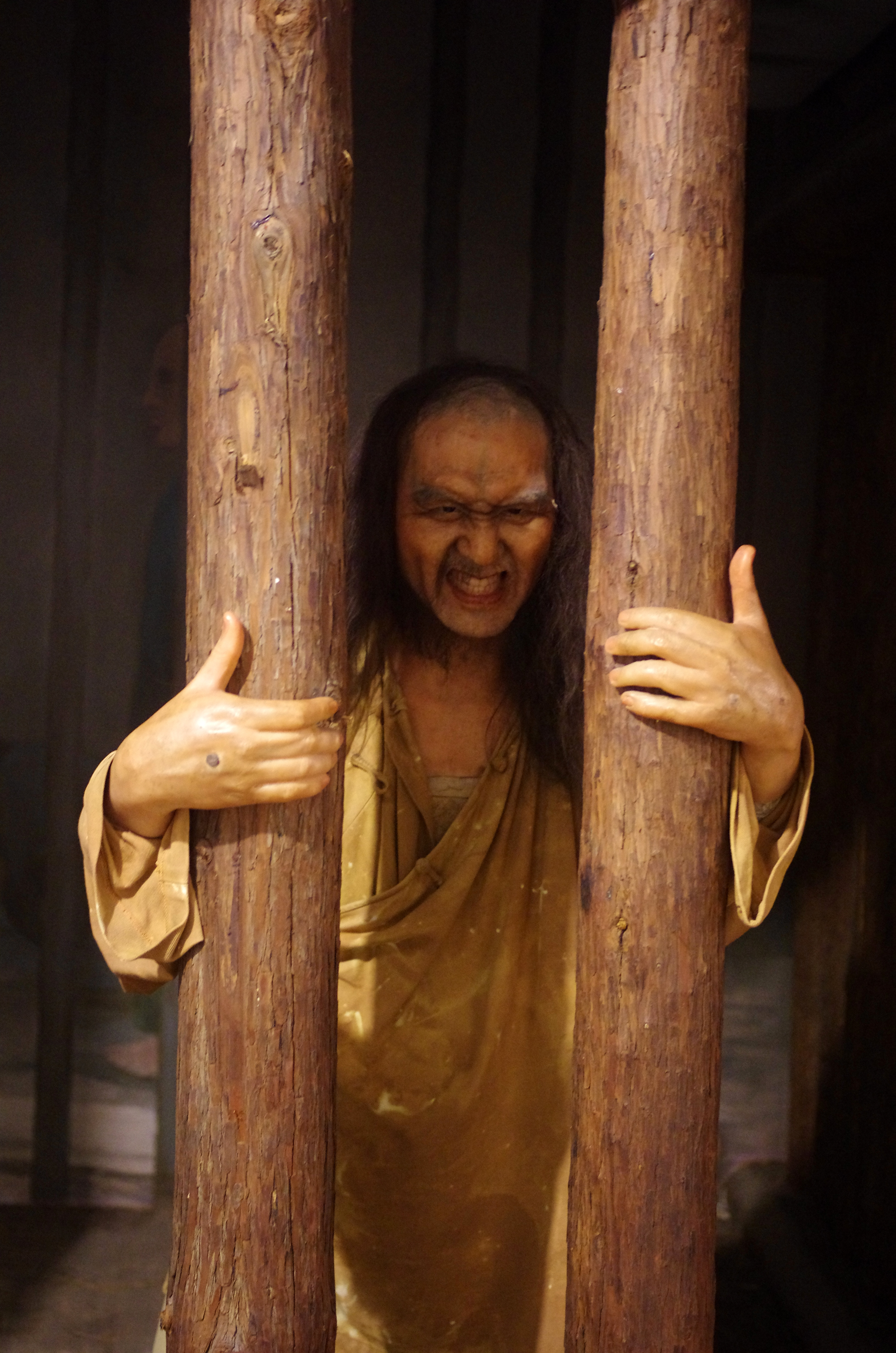
Wax figure depicting a prisoner detained in the underground prison beneath the Military Headquarters.

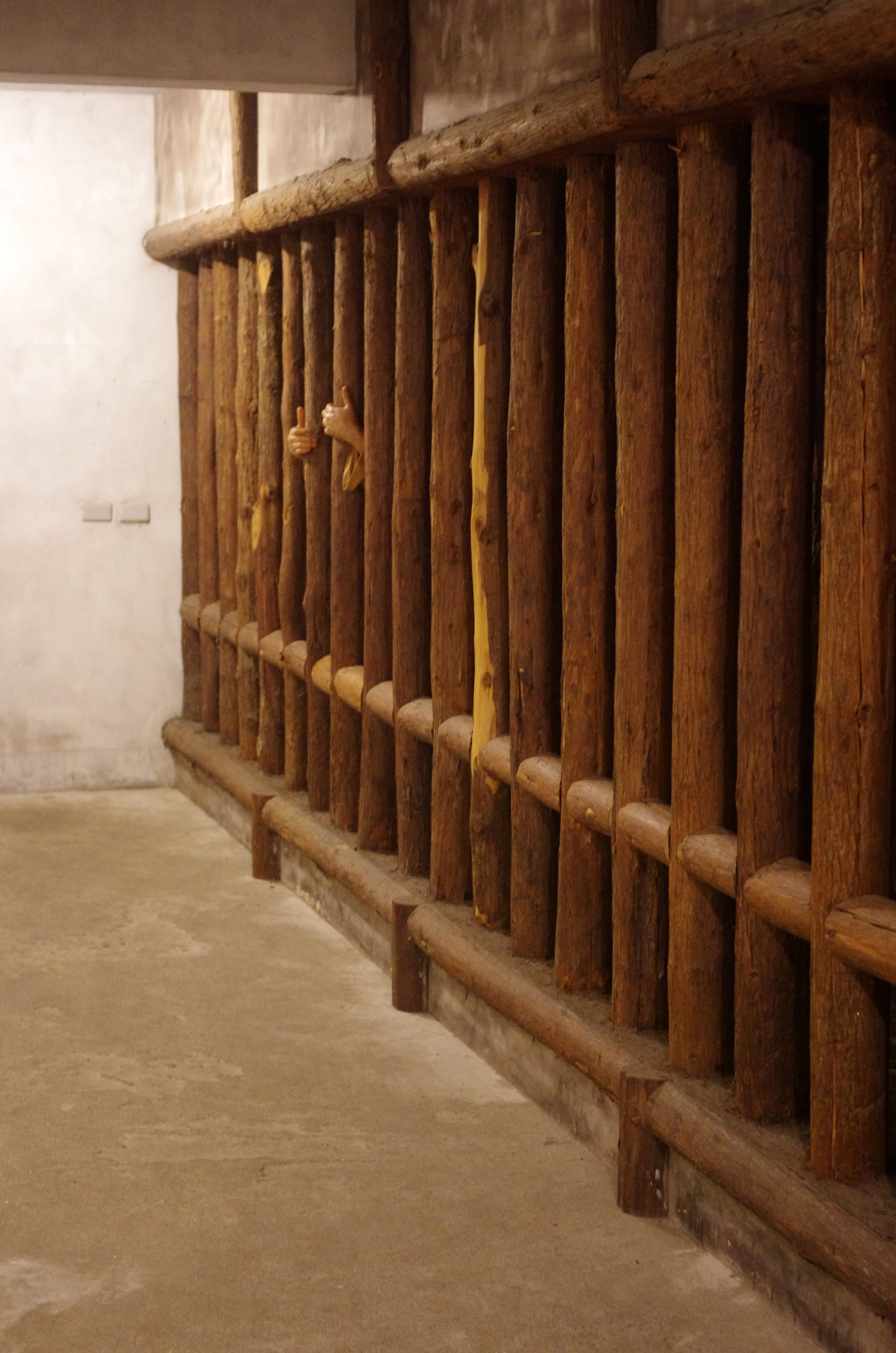
Underground prison beneath the Military Headquarters.

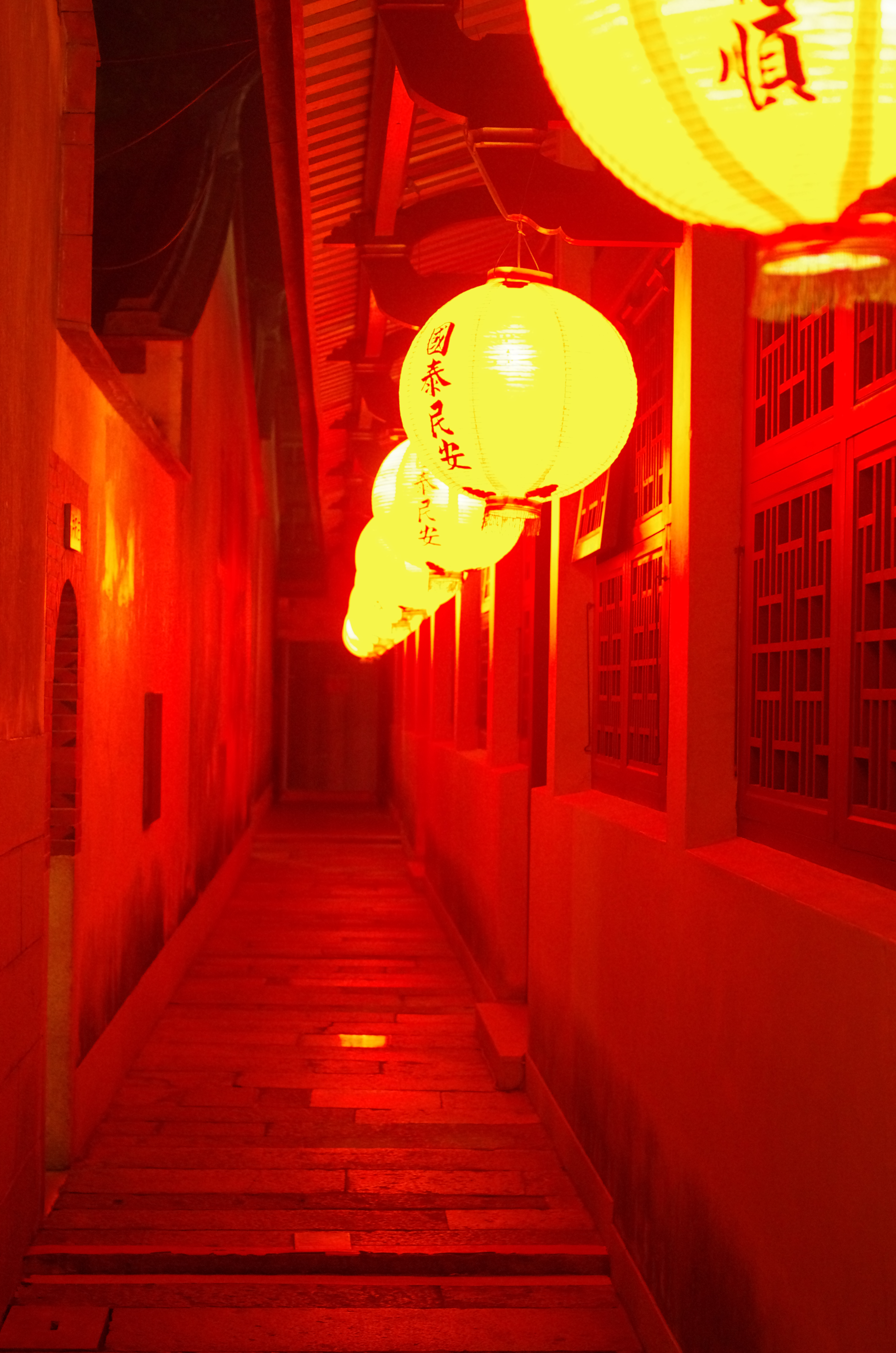
The east row of offices used for administrating the military forces and daily life on the island.

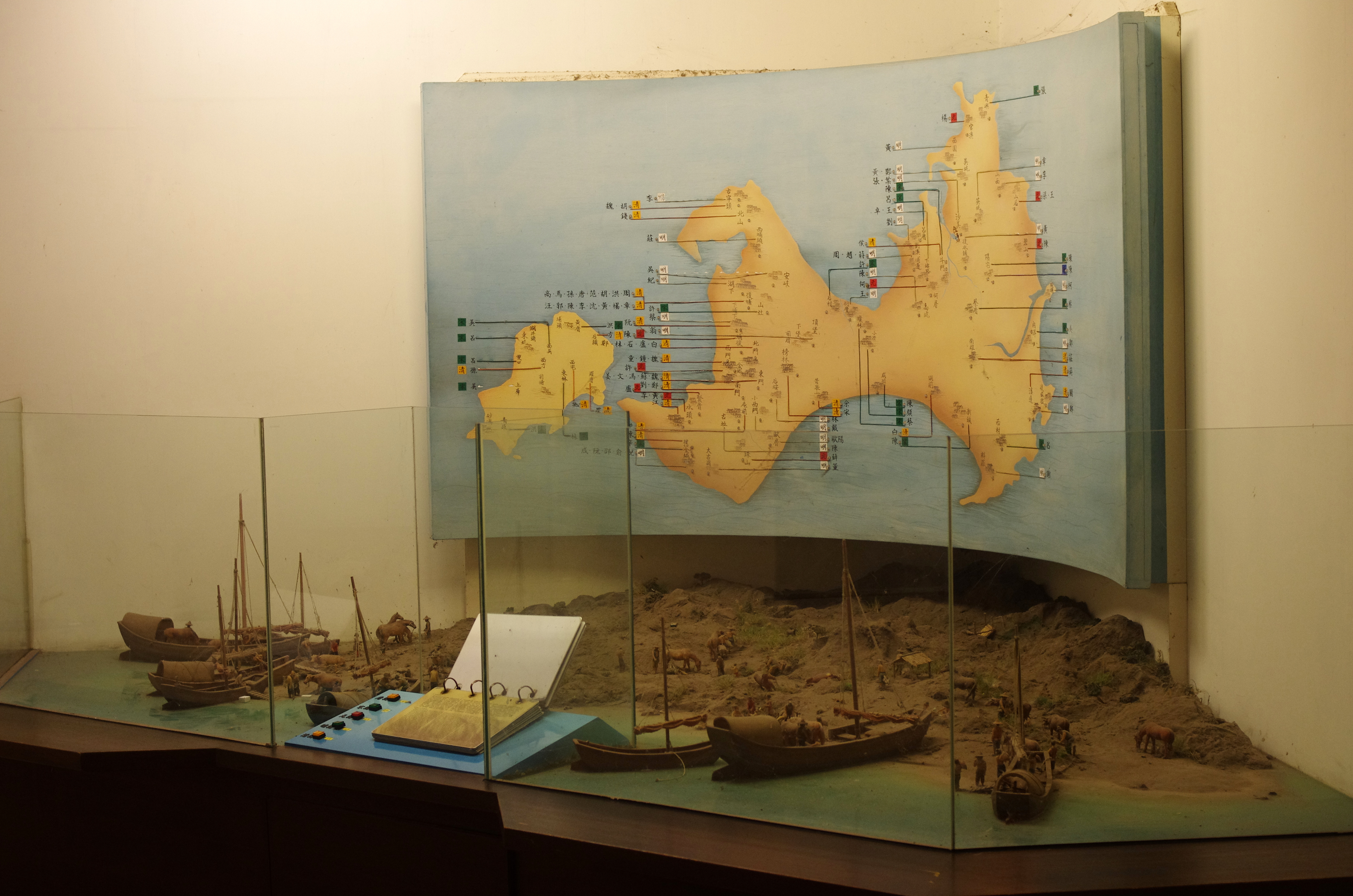
Model of early deployment of naval forces and a map depicting the spread of units across Kinmen

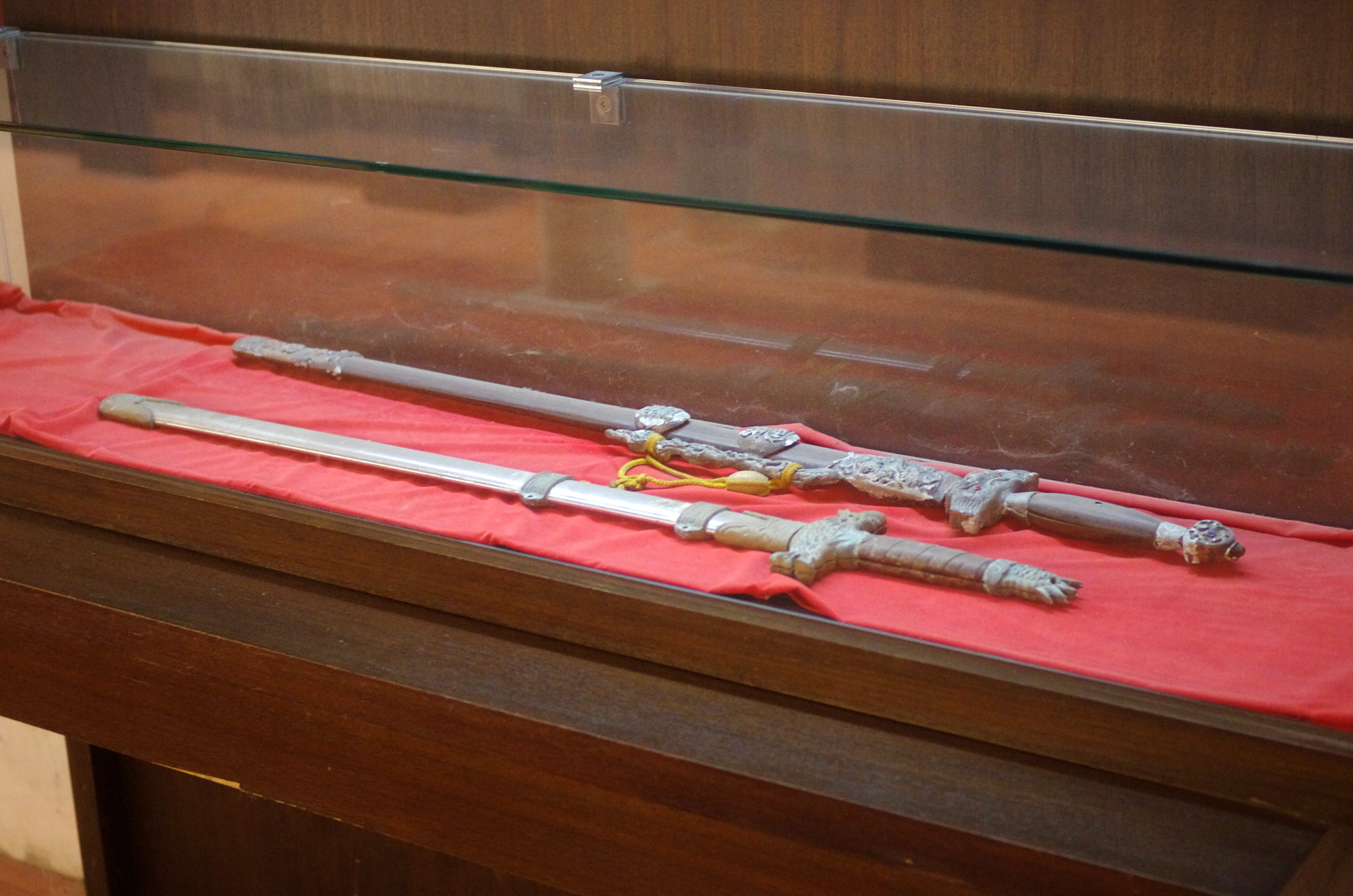
Historical weapons commonly used by defenders stationed on Kinmen.

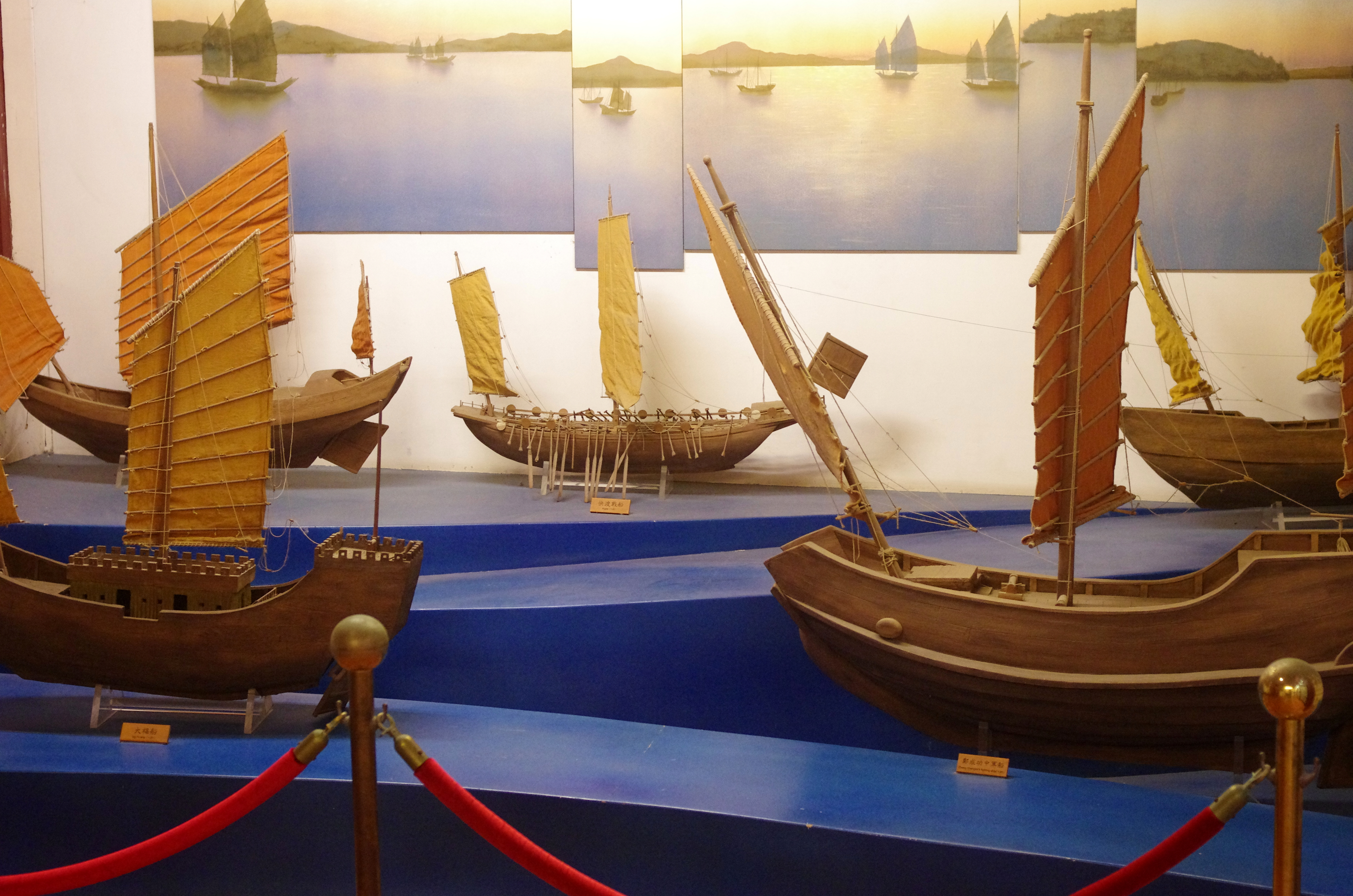
Model of various Chinese warships that were stationed throughout Kinmen's history.

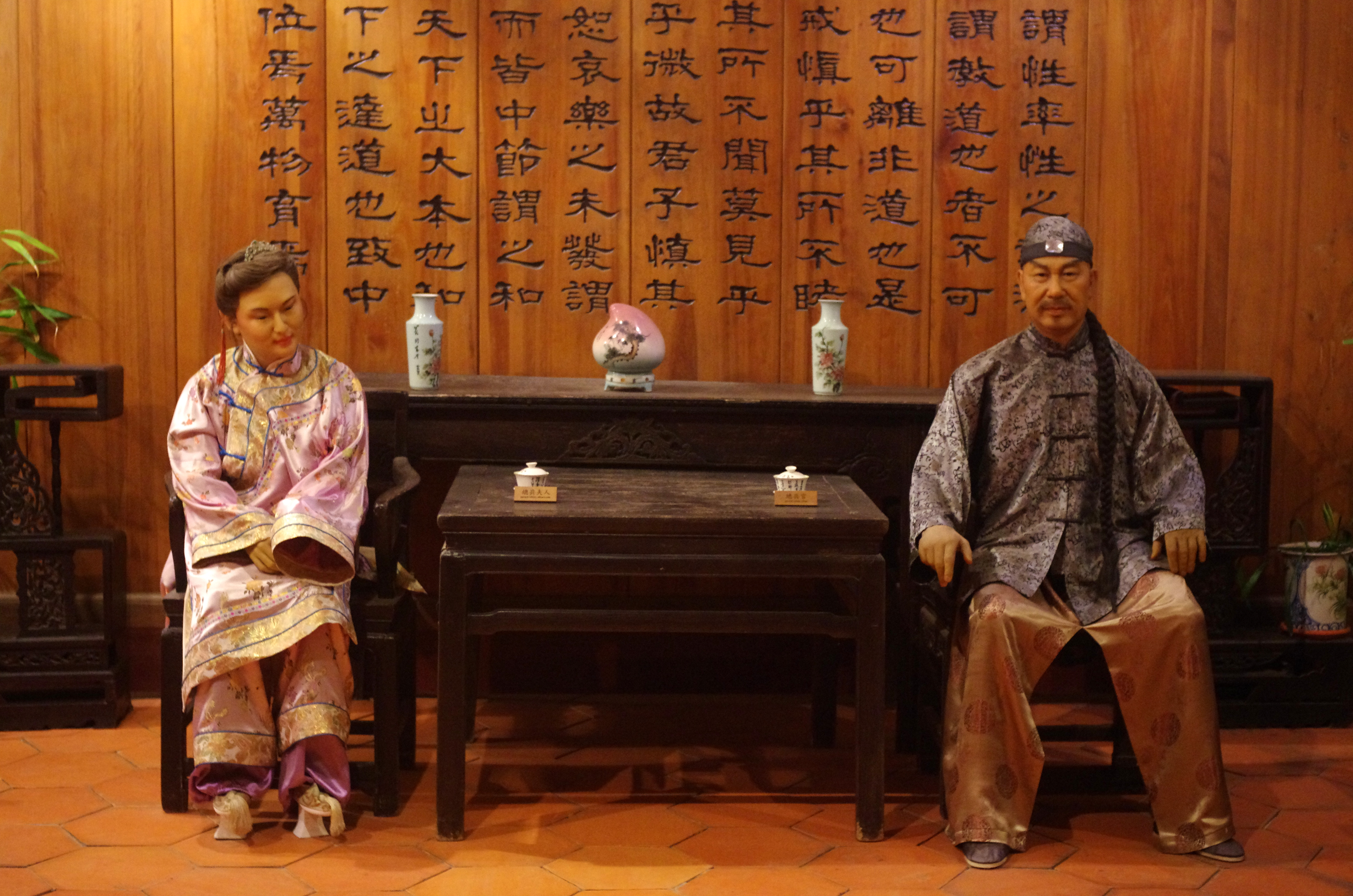
Wax figures depicting the Military commander with his wife in the second hall.

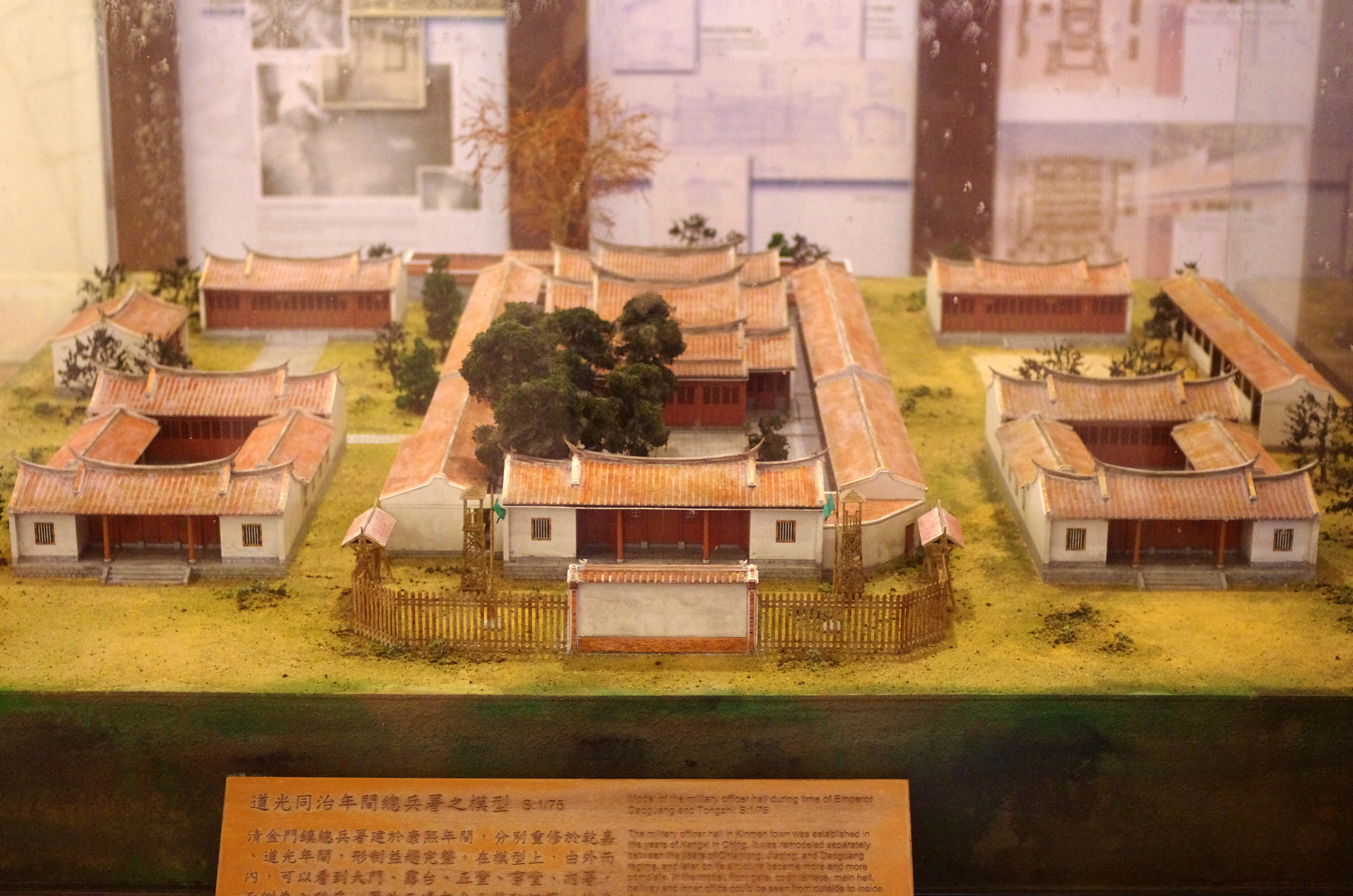
Model of the Military Headquarters with surrounding support structures in its heyday.

== See also ==
- Taiwan under Qing rule
