= Jincheng Seaside Park =

Park in Jincheng, Kinmen, Taiwan

- 金城海濱休閒公園
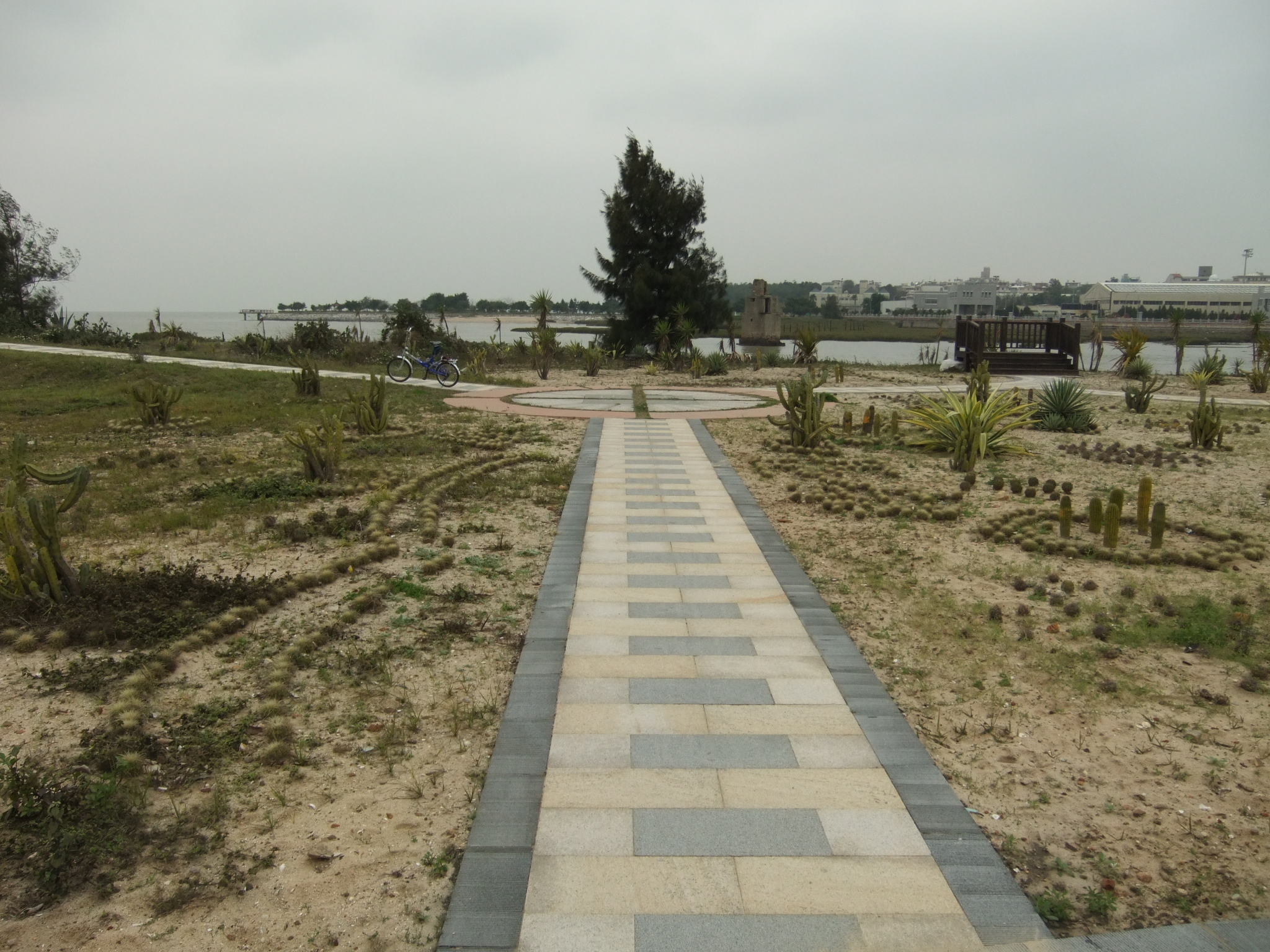
- Interactive map of Jincheng Seaside Park
- Type: park
- Location: Jincheng, Kinmen, Taiwan
- Coordinates: 24°25′48.7″N 118°18′36.9″E

The Jincheng Seaside Park (traditional Chinese: 金城海濱休閒公園; simplified Chinese: 金城海滨休闲公园; pinyin: Jīnchéng Hǎibīn Xiūxián Gōngyuán) is a park in Jincheng Township, Kinmen County, Taiwan. The park faces the Jiangong Island and Kinmen Harbor.

== Features ==
Cactus is extensively used in the landscaping of the park, equipped with information boards.

== See also ==
- List of tourist attractions in Taiwan
