= Jinshui Elementary School =

Former school in Jincheng, Kinmen, Taiwan

- 金水國小
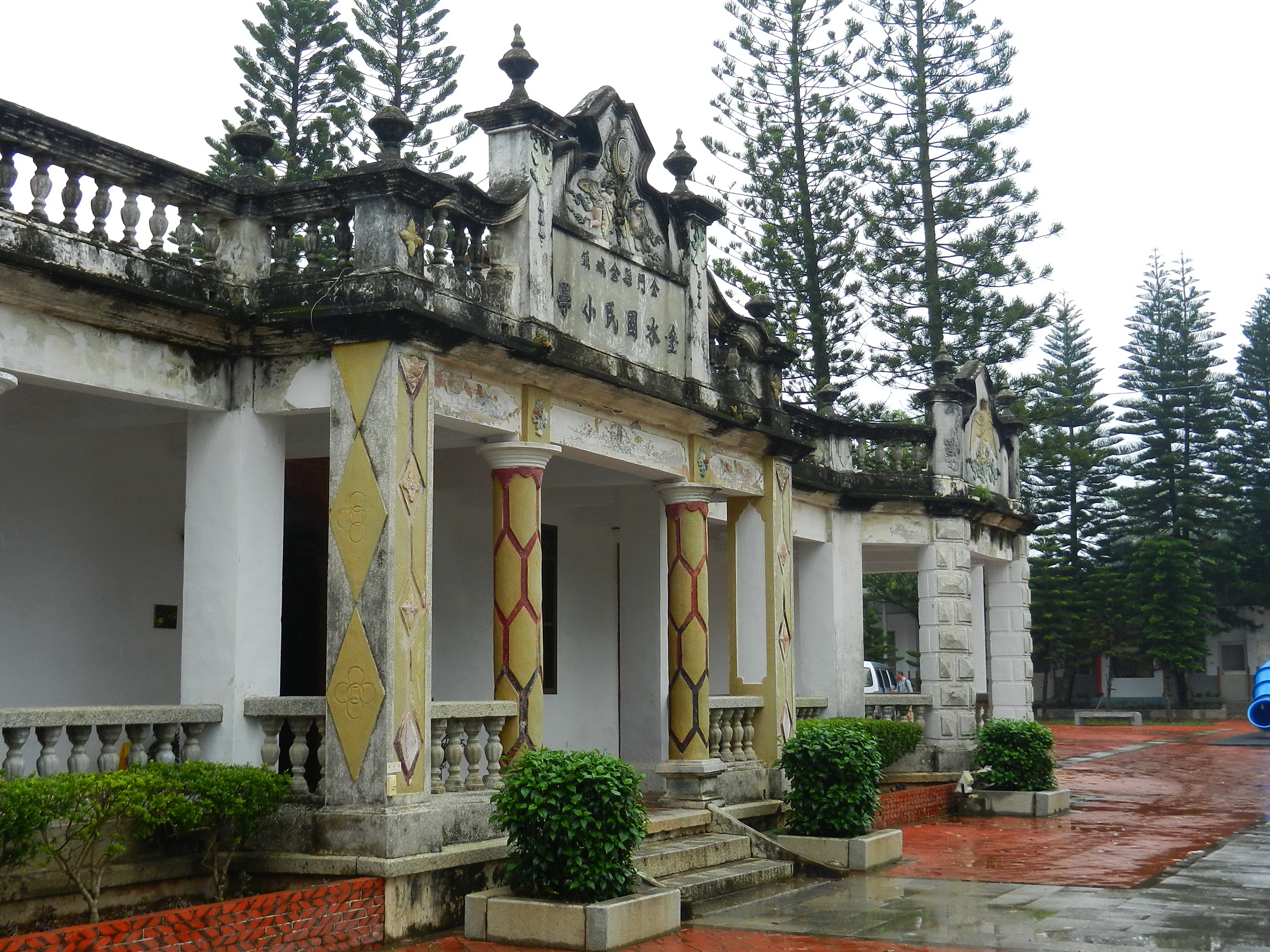

Location
- Jincheng, Kinmen, Taiwan
- Coordinates: 24°24′33.9″N 118°17′53.0″E

Information
- Type: elementary school
- Established: 1932

The Jinshui Elementary School (traditional Chinese: 金水國小; simplified Chinese: 金水国小; pinyin: Jīnshuǐ Guó Xiǎo) was an elementary school in Jincheng Township, Kinmen County, Taiwan.

== History ==
The school building was constructed in 1932. Upon completion, it was the largest western-style elementary school in the county.

== Architecture ==
The school building was designed with traditional academy architectural style.

== See also ==
- Education in Taiwan
