= Jincheng, Kinmen =

Jincheng 金城鎮 Kincheng, Chincheng, Chin-ch'eng
- Urban township
- Jincheng Township
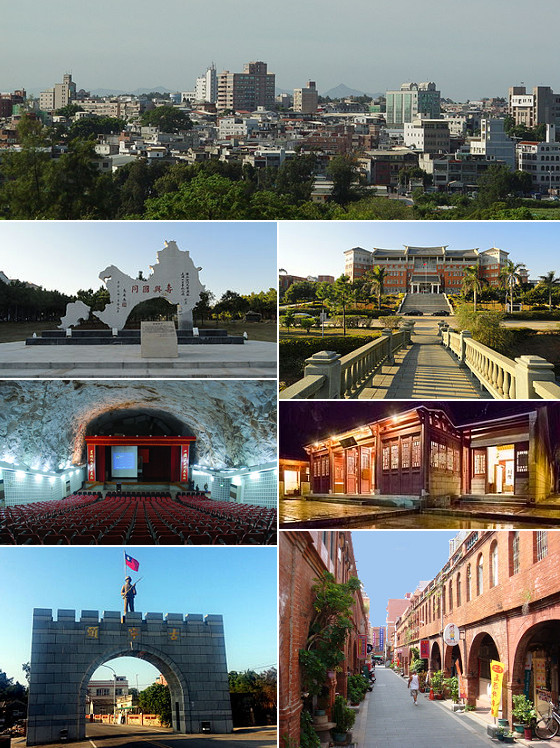

- Location in the Republic of China (Taiwan)
- Coordinates: 24°25′N 118°19′E
- Country: Republic of China (Taiwan)
- Province: Fuchien (streamlined)
- County: Kinmen
- Urban villages: 8

Government
  - Type: Strong magistrate-council
  - Mayor: Li Cheng-Chih (李誠智)

Area
  - Total: 21.7180 km^{2} (8.3854 sq mi)

Population (February 2023)
  - Total: 42,675
  - Density: 1,965.0/km^{2} (5,089.2/sq mi)
- Time zone: UTC+8 (CST)
- Postal code: 893
- Website: jincheng.kinmen.gov.tw

Jincheng, Kinmen
- Traditional Chinese: 金城鎮
Transcriptions
Standard Mandarin
- Hanyu Pinyin: Jīnchéng Zhèn
- Wade–Giles: Chin¹-ch'eng² Chen⁴
- Tongyong Pinyin: Jinchéng Jhèn
Hakka
- Romanization: Kîm-sàng-tsṳ́n
Southern Min
- Hokkien POJ: Kim-siâⁿ-tìn

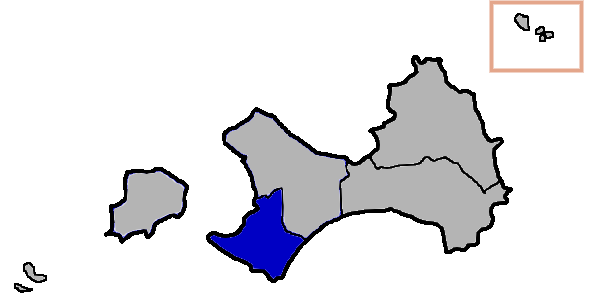
Jincheng Township (blue) in Kinmen County (grey)

Jincheng Township (Chinese: 金城鎮) is an urban township on the southwestern corner of the island of Kinmen. It is the county seat of Kinmen County, Fuchien Province, Taiwan. Jincheng was the seat of the Republic of China (Taiwan)'s Fuchien Province from 1949–1956 and 1996–2018. In March 2012, it was named one of the Top 10 Small Tourist Towns by the Tourism Bureau.

== History ==
Jincheng also served as the capital of Republic of China's Fuchien Province from 1949 to 1956. From 1956 to 1996, the capital of Fuchien Province was relocated to Xindian, Taipei County. In 1996, the capital was moved back to Jincheng.

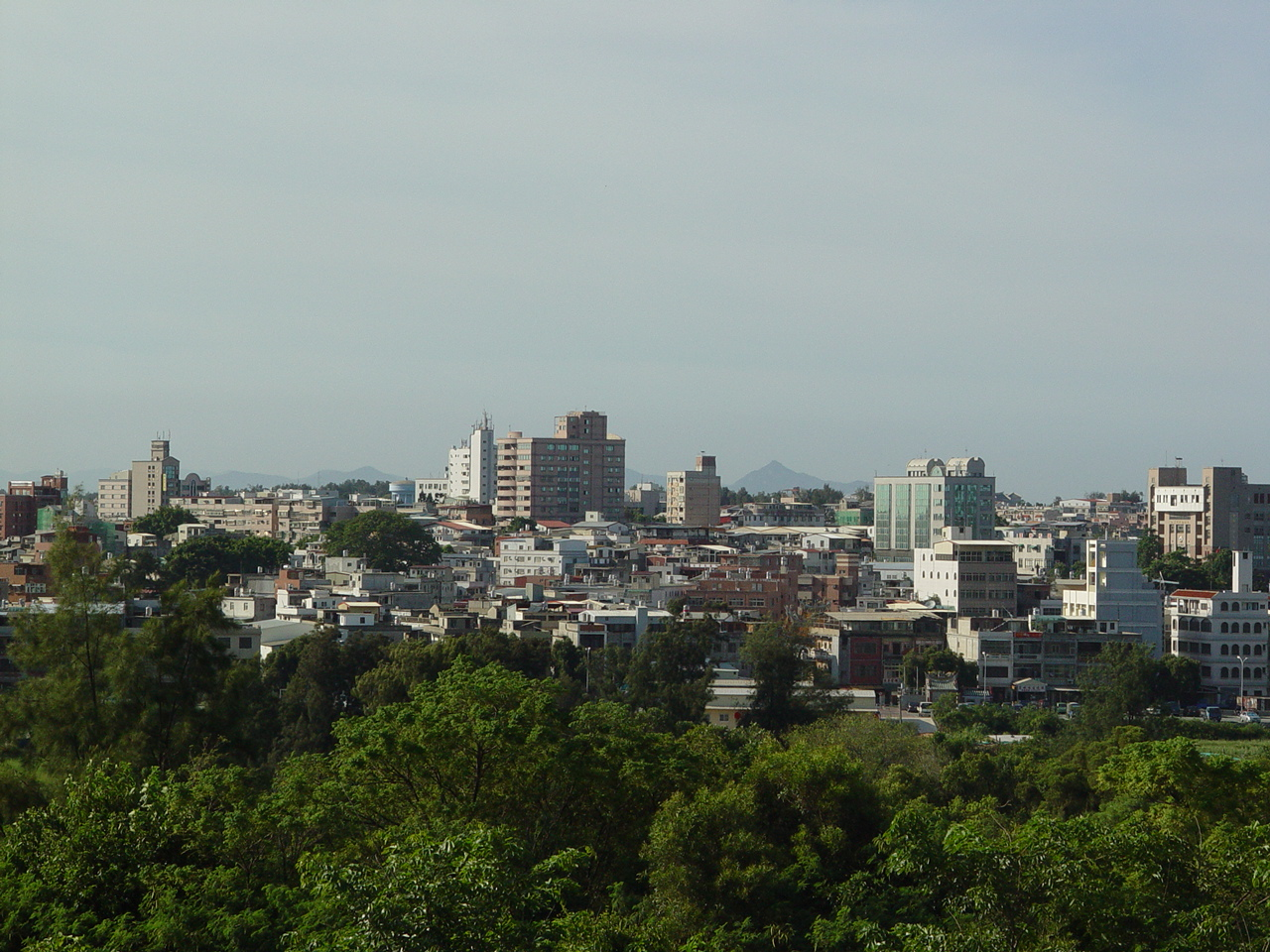
View of Downtown Jincheng from Mount Taiwu

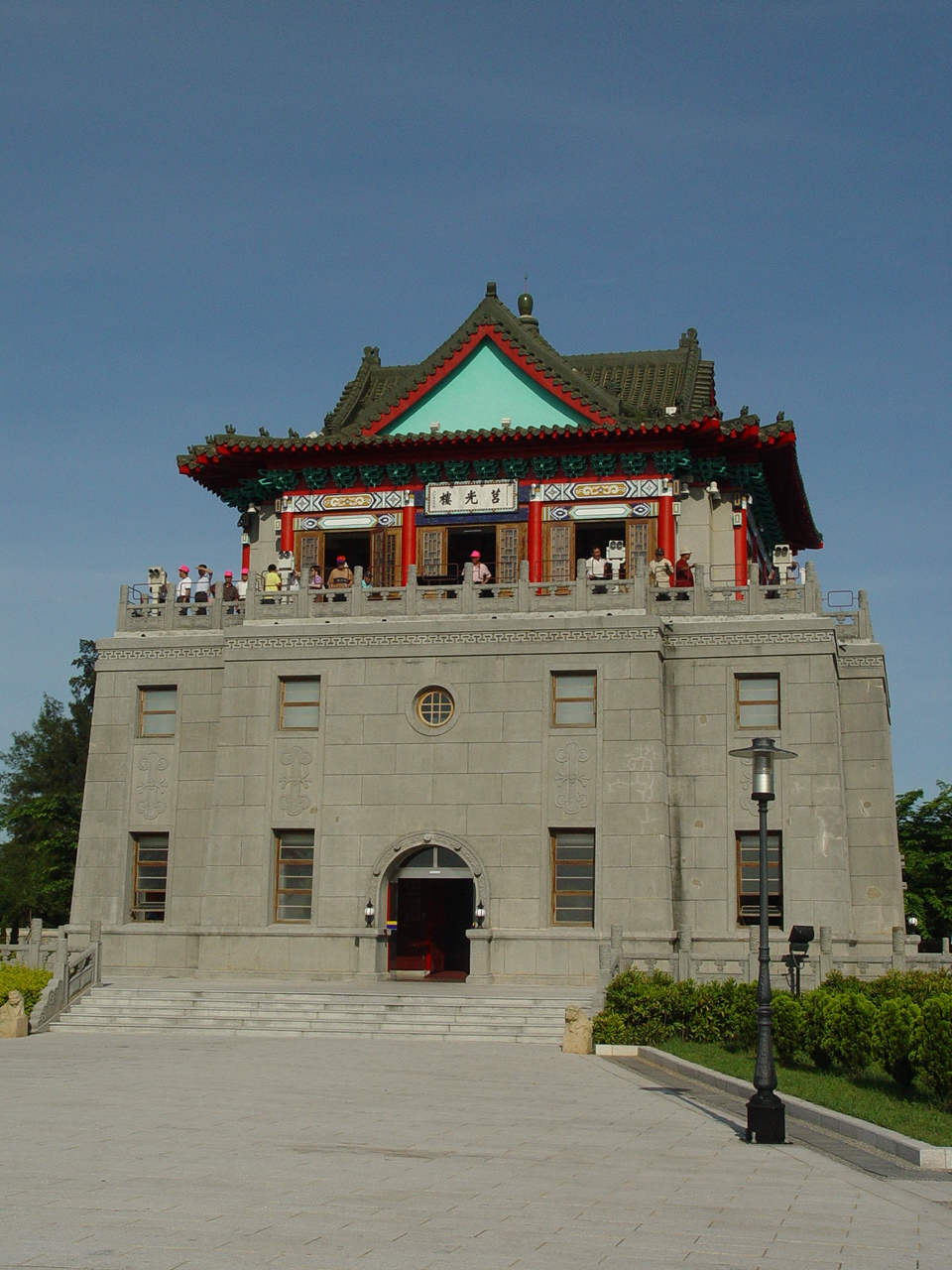
Juguang Tower

== Administrative divisions ==
Jincheng is divided into eight urban villages:

- Beimen Village (北門里)
- Gucheng Village (古城里)
- Jinshui/Jinshuei Village (金水里)
- Nanmen Village (南門里)
- Dongmen/Tungmen Village (東門里)
- Xianan/Sianan Village (賢庵里)
- Ximen Village (西門里)
- Zhusha/Jhusha Village (珠沙里)
  - Zhushan Village (Chushan)

=== Mayors ===
- Appointed mayors
1. Wang Ping-Yuan (王秉垣) (1954–1955)
2. Liao Ko-Hsiung (廖國雄) (1954–1958)
3. Chiu Yuan (丘員) (1958– 1960)
- Elected mayors
1. Shih Ping-Yen (石炳炎) (1960–1971)
2. Hsu Chi-Yung (許績永) (1971–1980)
3. Fu Wen-Min (符文敏) (1980 -1982)
4. Cheng Ching-Li (鄭慶利) (1982–1990)
5. Hsu Wen-Li (徐文理) (1990 -1991)
6. Chen Shih-Chi (陳世基) (1991–1992)
7. Hsu Yung-Chen (許永鎮) (1992–1994)
8. Hsu Chin-Hsiang (許金象) (1994–2002)
9. Tsai Hui-Shih (蔡輝詩) (2002–2010)
10. Shih Chao-Min (石兆瑉) (2010–2018)
11. Li Cheng-Chih (李誠智) (2018–present)

== Climate ==
Climate data for Jimen Dao
Month	Jan	Feb	Mar	Apr	May	Jun	Jul	Aug	Sep	Oct	Nov	Dec	Year
Mean daily maximum °C (°F)	16 (60)	15 (59)	17 (63)	21 (70)	26 (78)	28 (83)	31 (87)	31 (88)	30 (86)	26 (79)	23 (73)	18 (65)	24 (74)
Mean daily minimum °C (°F)	10 (50)	10 (50)	12 (54)	16 (60)	20 (68)	24 (75)	26 (78)	26 (78)	24 (76)	21 (69)	17 (62)	13 (55)	18 (65)
Average precipitation mm (inches)	18 (.7)	66 (2.6)	43 (1.7)	61 (2.4)	100 (4.0)	110 (4.2)	110 (4.3)	79 (3.1)	94 (3.7)	5.1 (.2)	15 (.6)	7.6 (.3)	708.7 (27.8)
Source: Weatherbase

== Government institutions ==
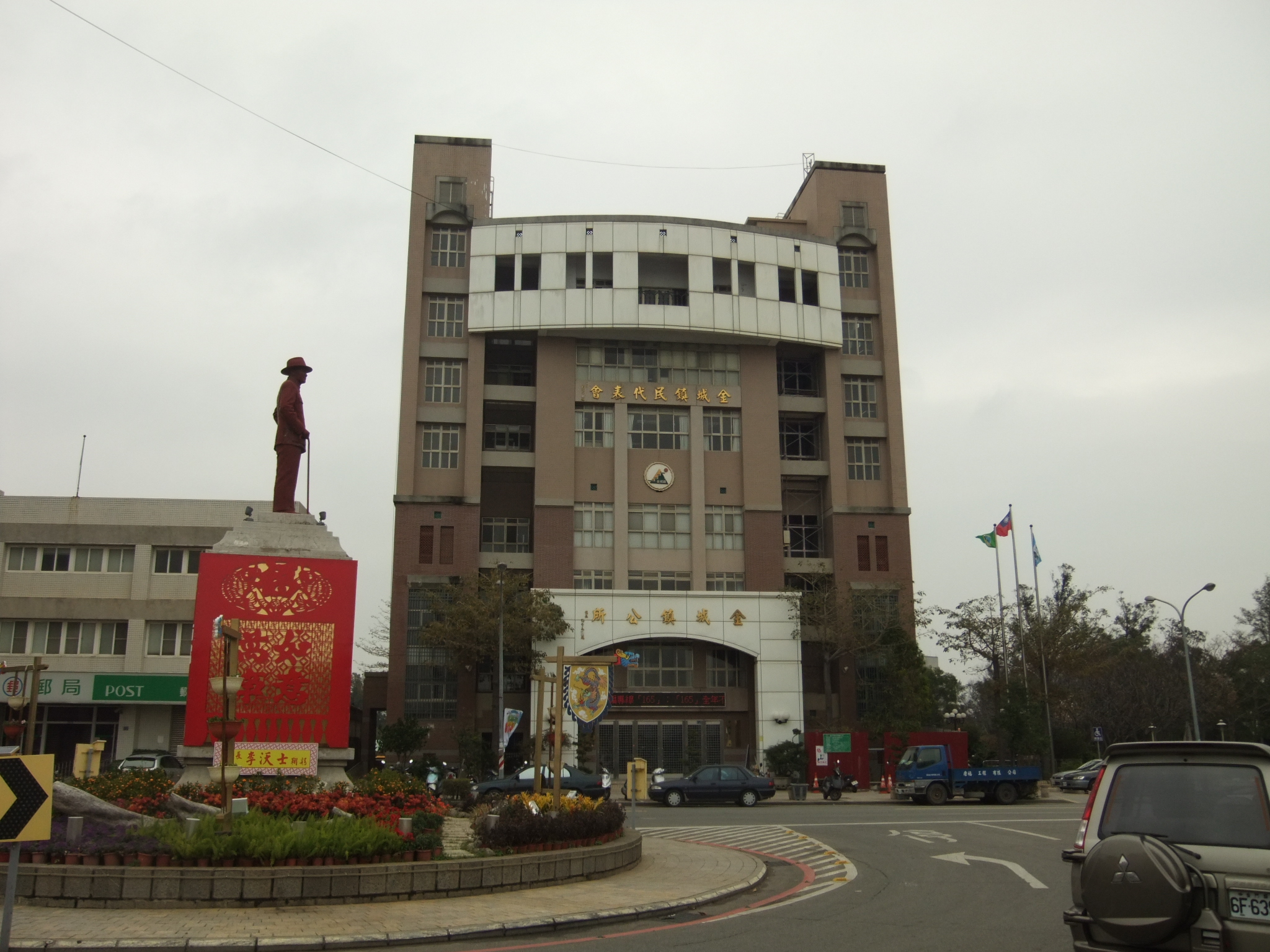
Jincheng Township office

- Kinmen-Matsu Joint Services Center
- Kinmen County Government
- Kinmen County Council
- Kinmen Fisheries Research Institute

== Infrastructure ==
- Tashan Power Plant

== Tourist attractions ==
- Chastity Arch for Qiu Liang-gong's Mother
- Chen Shi-yin Western Style House
- Deyue Gun Tower
- Gugang Lake
- Houpu 16 Creative Park (後浦16藝文特區)
- Jiangong Islet
- Jincheng Civil Defense Tunnel
- Jincheng Seaside Park
- Jinshui Elementary School
- Juguang Tower
- Kinmen Military Headquarters of the Qing Dynasty
- Maoshan Pagoda
- Mofan Street
- Wentai Pagoda
- Xujiang Xiaowo Stone Inscription
- Yannan Academy
- Zhaishan Tunnel

== Transportation ==
- Shuitou Pier

== Notable natives ==
- Dong Zhisen, journalist
