= Deyue Gun Tower =

Tower in Jincheng, Kinmen, Taiwan

- 得月樓
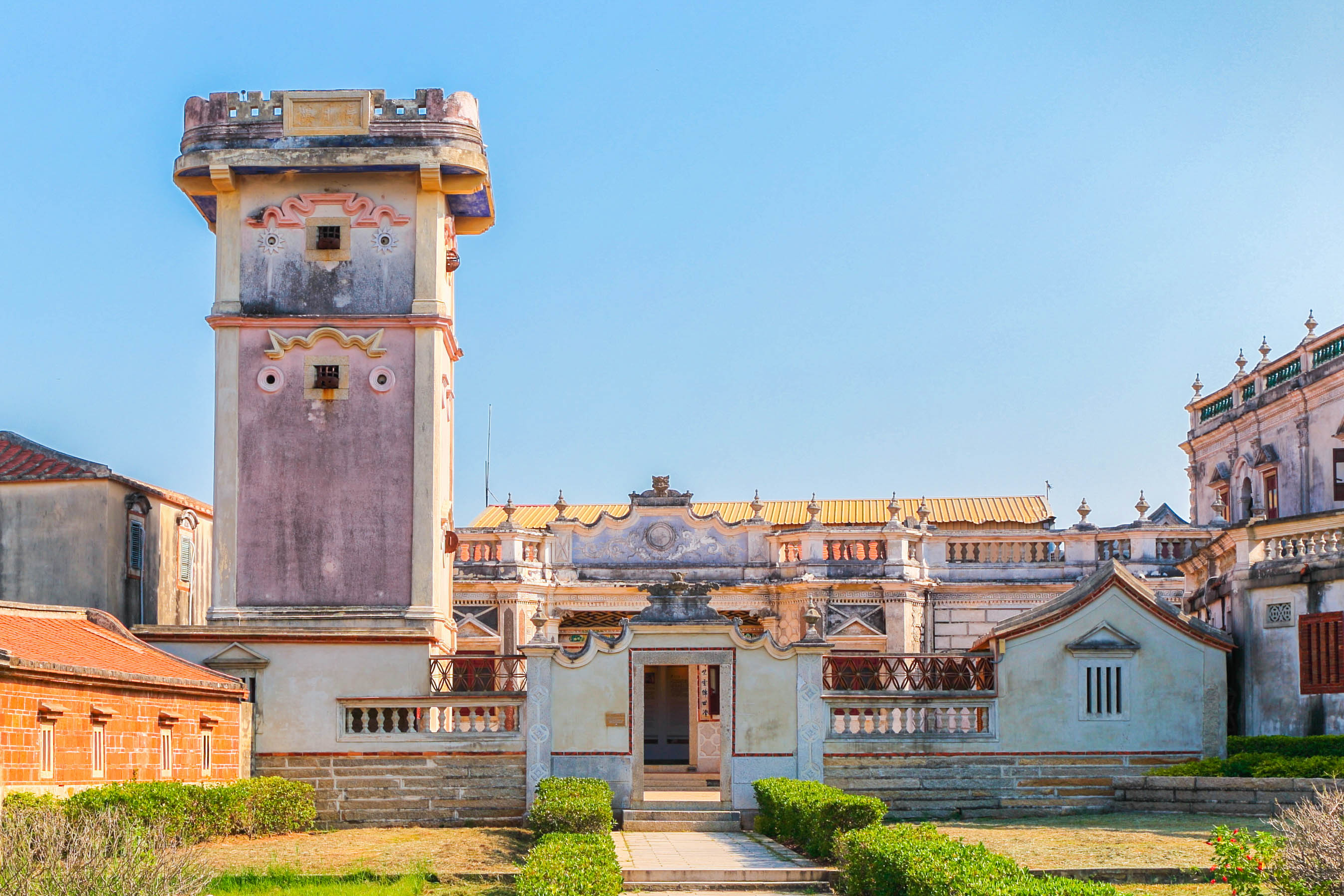
- Interactive map of the Deyue Gun Tower area

General information
- Type: tower
- Location: Jincheng, Kinmen, Taiwan
- Coordinates: 24°24′35.1″N 118°17′54.6″E
- Completed: 1931

Height
- Height: 11 m (36 ft)

Design and construction
- Structural engineer: Huang Hui-huang

The Deyue Gun Tower (traditional Chinese: 得月樓; simplified Chinese: 得月楼; pinyin: Déyuè Lóu) is a tower in Jincheng Township, Kinmen County, Fujian Province, Republic of China.

== History ==
The tower was built in 1931 by Huang Hui-huang, a wealthy merchant from Shuitou.

== Architecture ==
The tower stands at a height of 11 meters.

== See also ==
- List of tourist attractions in Taiwan
