= Zhaishan Tunnel =

Tunnel in Jincheng, Kinmen, Taiwan

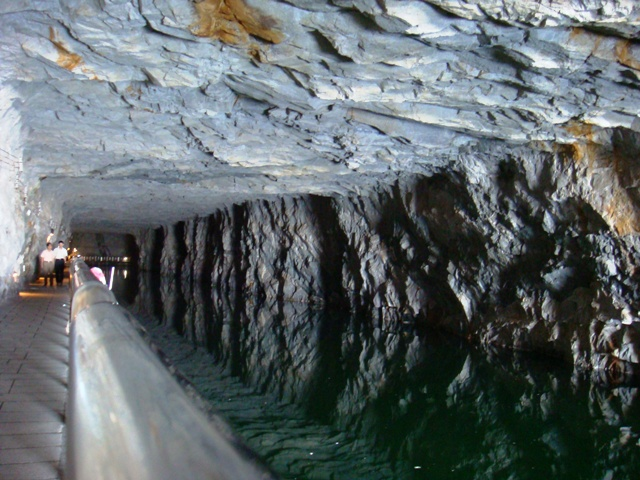
- Interactive map of Zhaishan Tunnel

Overview
- Official name: 翟山坑道
- Location: Jincheng, Kinmen, Taiwan
- Coordinates: 24°23′25.1″N 118°19′14.8″E

Operation
- Work began: 1961
- Opened: 22 March 1966
- Closed: 1986
- Reopened: 1998
- Operator: Kinmen National Park

Technical
- Length: 101 m (331 ft)
- Tunnel clearance: 3.5 m (11 ft)
- Width: 6 m (20 ft)

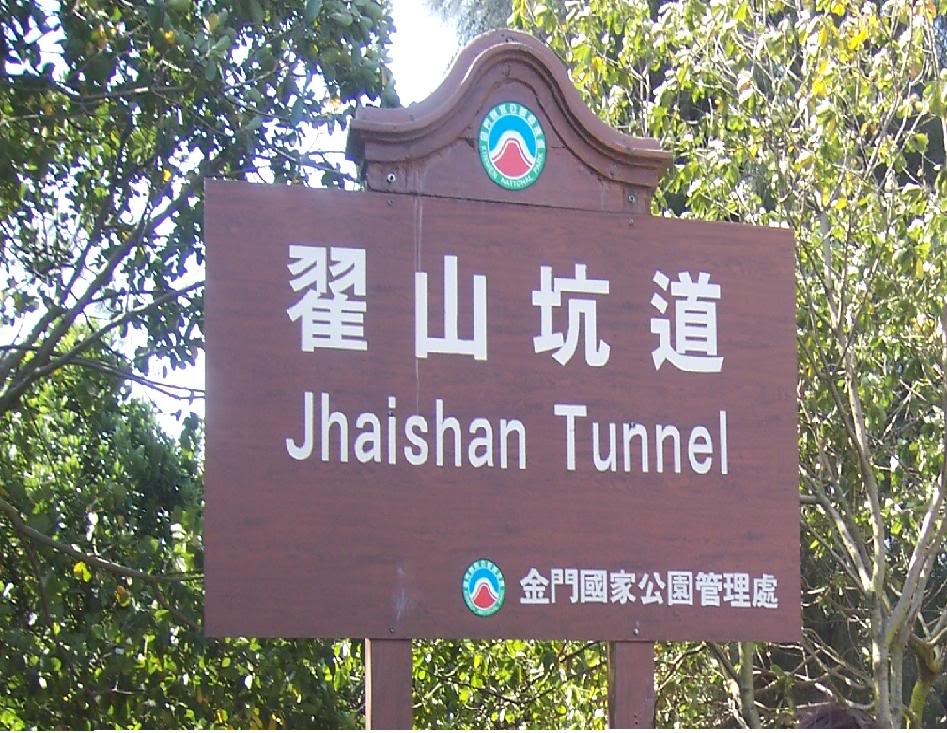
Tunnel entrance signboard

The Zhaishan Tunnel (Chinese: 翟山坑道; pinyin: Zháishān Kēngdào; Pe̍h-ōe-jī: Chú-soaⁿ Khiⁿ-tō) is a tunnel in Jincheng Township, Kinmen County, Taiwan. The tunnel was built to house boats and can accommodate forty-two vessels.

== History ==
Construction of the tunnel started in 1961 and was completed on 22 March 1966, a few years after the Second Taiwan Strait Crisis in 1958 between the Republic of China Armed Forces and People's Liberation Army. Due to the lack of manpower and money to maintain the tunnel, it was closed and abandoned in 1986. Later on, there was growing interest in preserving the national heritage and remembering those who fought for Kinmen, thus on 23 May 1997, the Kinmen National Park took over the management of the tunnel. The tunnel was opened to the public in 1998.

== Structures ==
The tunnel is 101 m (110 yd) in length, 6 m (20 ft) in width and 3.5 m (11 ft 6 in) in height. There are seven rooms inside that serve as barracks. The tunnel features an A-shaped waterway with 357 meters in length, 11.5 meters in width and 8 meters in height. It was used to conceal small naval vessels.

== Activities ==
The tunnel has been the venue for the Kinmen Tunnel Music Festival since 2019.

== See also ==
- List of tourist attractions in Taiwan
- Beihai Tunnel (Beigan)
- Beihai Tunnel (Nangan)
- Beihai Tunnel (Dongyin)
