= Dong Zhisen =

Taiwanese journalist

- 董智森
- Born: 24 June 1960 (age 66); Kinmen, Republic of China
- Education: Tamkang University (BA)
- Occupation: Journalist

Dong Zhisen (born 24 June 1960) is a journalist from Jincheng, Kinmen, Republic of China. Dong used to work as a reporter for China Times and United Daily News. He covered mainly Taipei Municipal news. He was the former presenter of the TVBS political talk show《2100全民開講. He has a Hokkien accent when speaking in Mandarin.

== Professional background ==
Starting as a reporter, Dong has covered news mainly about Taipei. He then shifted to political commentary. On March 12, 2013, when 李濤 announced a temporary withdrawal 《2100全民開講》, Dong took over.

== See also ==
- Taipei City Government
