= Chastity Arch for Qiu Liang-gong's Mother =

Paifang in Jincheng, Kinmen, Taiwan

- 邱良功母節孝坊
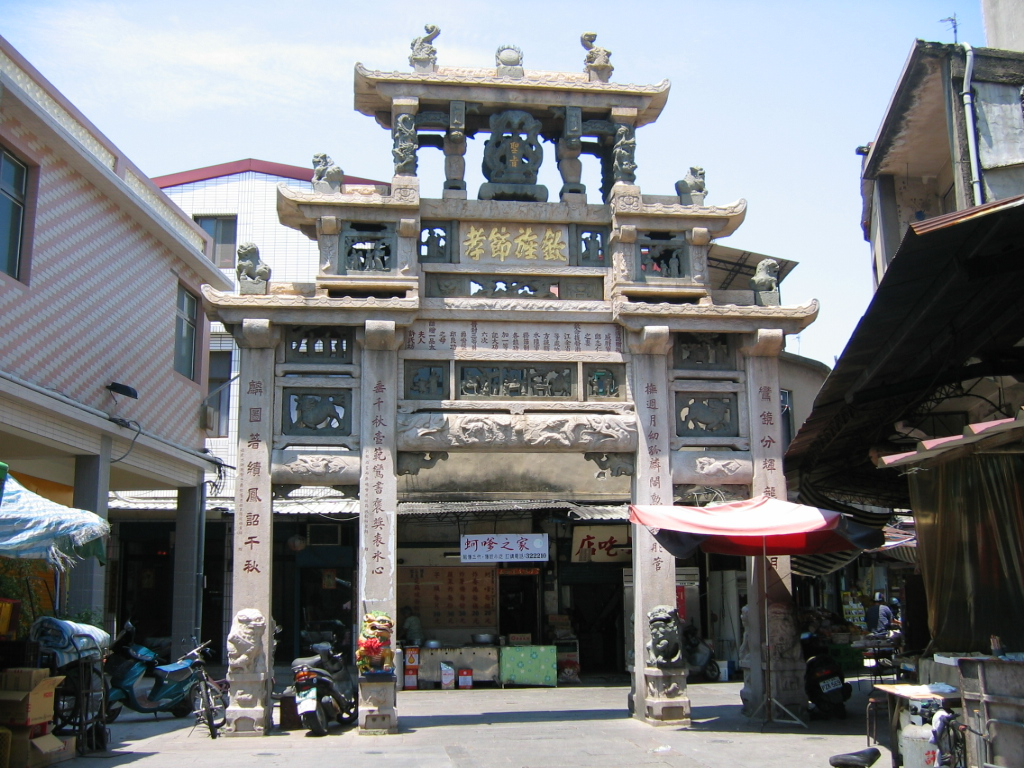
- Interactive map of the Chastity Arch for Qiu Liang-gong's Mother area

General information
- Type: paifang
- Location: Jincheng, Kinmen, Taiwan
- Coordinates: 24°25′53.1″N 118°19′6.7″E
- Completed: 1812

The Chastity Arch for Qiu Liang-gong's Mother (traditional Chinese: 邱良功母節孝坊; simplified Chinese: 邱良功母节孝坊; pinyin: Qiū Liánggōng Mǔjié Xiàofāng) is a paifang in Jincheng, Kinmen, Taiwan.

== History ==
Qiu Liang-gong was born in Kinmen. His father died 35 days after his birth, leaving his mother alone to raise him. Her mother never remarried. Qiu grew up later to become a military officer in the navy. His mother was then honored and the arch was constructed for her in 1812.

== Architecture ==
The arch is a four-pillar, three-section stone structure made of granite and limestone. There are four pairs of stone lions located at the front and back sides of the pillar.

== See also ==
- List of tourist attractions in Taiwan
