= Yannan Academy =

Former tutorial academy in Jincheng, Kinmen, Taiwan

- 燕南书院
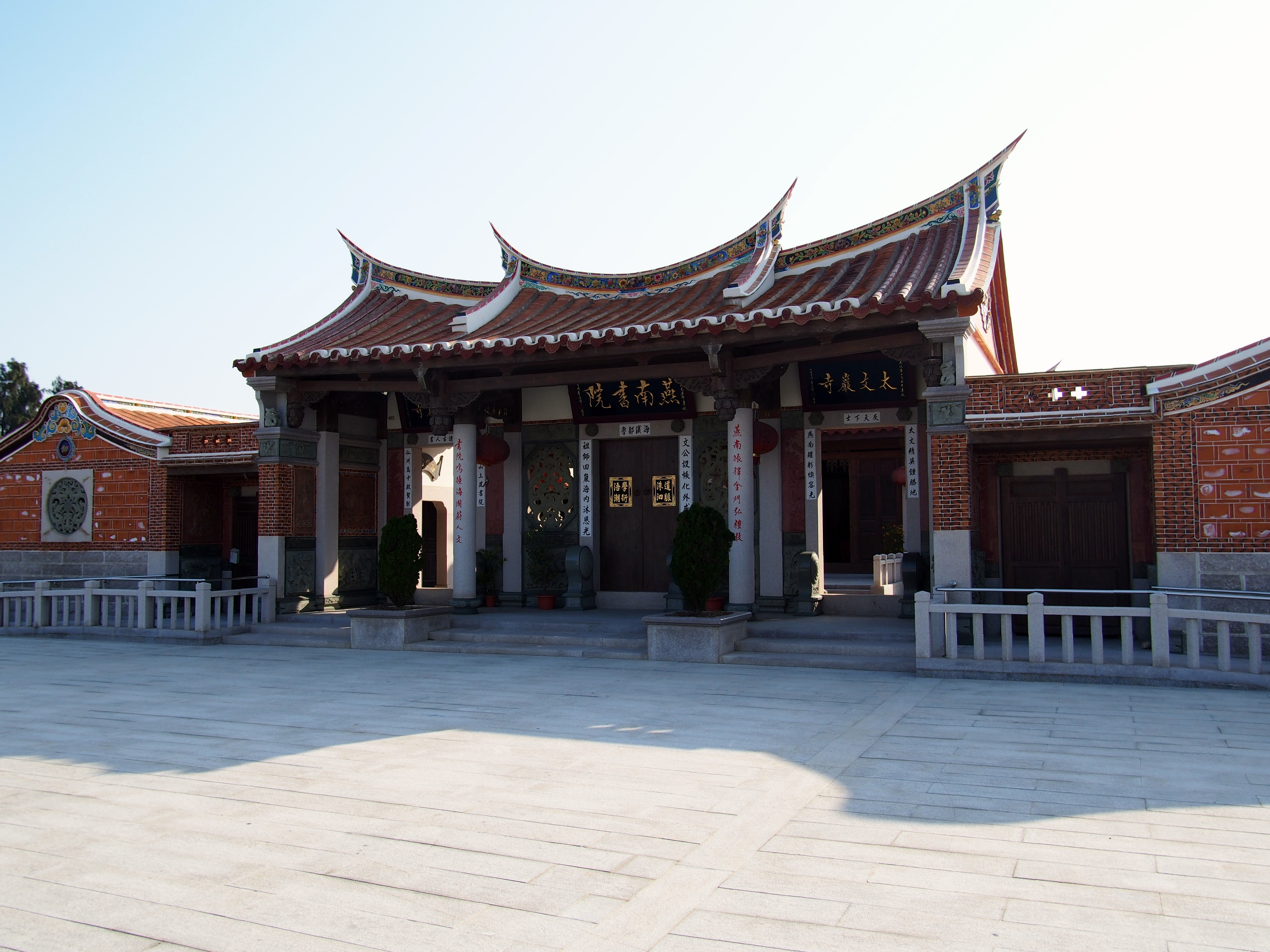

Location
- Jincheng, Kinmen, Taiwan
- Coordinates: 24°24′24.1″N 118°18′49.3″E

Information
- Type: former academy

The Yannan Academy (traditional Chinese: 燕南書院; simplified Chinese: 燕南书院; pinyin: Yànnán Shūyuàn) is a former tutorial academy in Jincheng Township, Kinmen County, Taiwan.

== History ==
In 2012, the academy underwent renovation to make it as a 回-shaped building.

== Architecture ==
The front hall of the academy is dedicated to Qingshui Anchester God and the back hall is dedicated to gods related to study and exams. The rooms on the left and right wings are the exhibition and activity space. In the courtyard, lies a giant scroll shaped art.

== See also ==
- List of tourist attractions in Taiwan
