= Chen Shi-yin Western Style House =

Former residence in Jincheng, Kinmen, Taiwan

- 陳詩吟洋樓
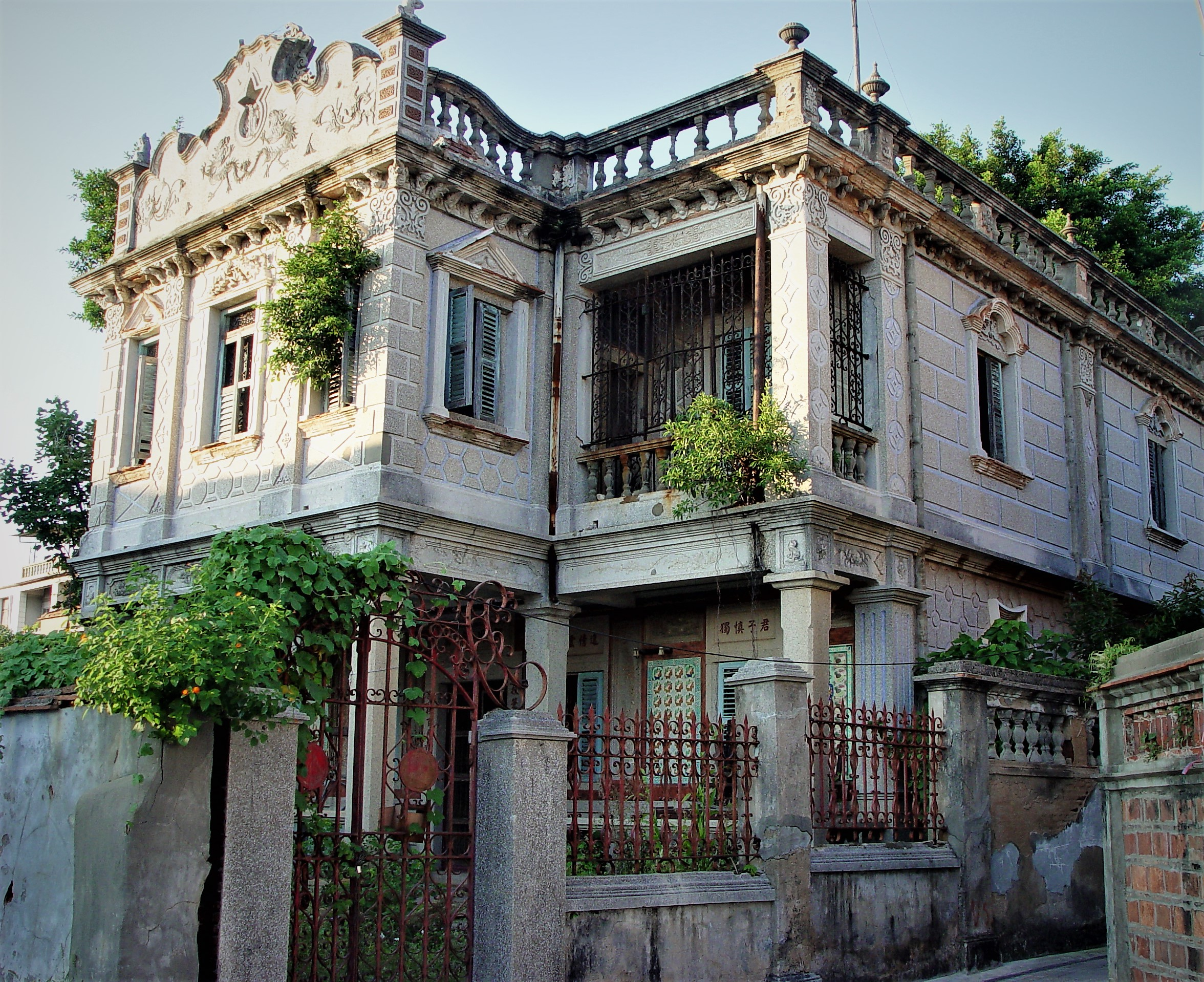
- Interactive map of the Chen Shi-yin Western Style House area

General information
- Type: house
- Architectural style: western, Chinese
- Location: Jincheng, Kinmen, Taiwan
- Coordinates: 24°25′53.5″N 118°19′03.8″E
- Construction started: 1932
- Owner: Chen Shi-yin

The Chen Shi-yin Western Style House (traditional Chinese: 陳詩吟洋樓; simplified Chinese: 陈诗吟洋楼; pinyin: Chén Shīyín Yáng Lóu) is a house in Jincheng Township, Kinmen County, Taiwan.

== History ==
The house was established in 1932 by Chen Shi-yin, a local merchant, and his wife, Hsueh Hsien-chen. Chen became rich after surge in demand due to World War I, thus making him constructing the house after returned to Kinmen from Dutch East Indies and British Singapore. The full construction of the house was coordinate by Hsueh and his nephew, Chen Wen-fan. When Chen died, the house was only half completed. Hsueh then settled in the house for four years before the World War II broke out. She then left Kinmen to Singapore for good. Around 1983, the house was used to house the teachers of Kinmen Senior High School.

== Architecture ==
The house features a protruding turtle head at its entrance part. It was constructed with western and Chinese-style architecture. The doorway couplets were written Fu Hsi-chi.

== See also ==
- List of tourist attractions in Taiwan
