= Xujiang Xiaowo Stone Inscription =

Inscription in Jincheng, Kinmen, Taiwan

- 虛江嘯臥碣群 (Chinese)
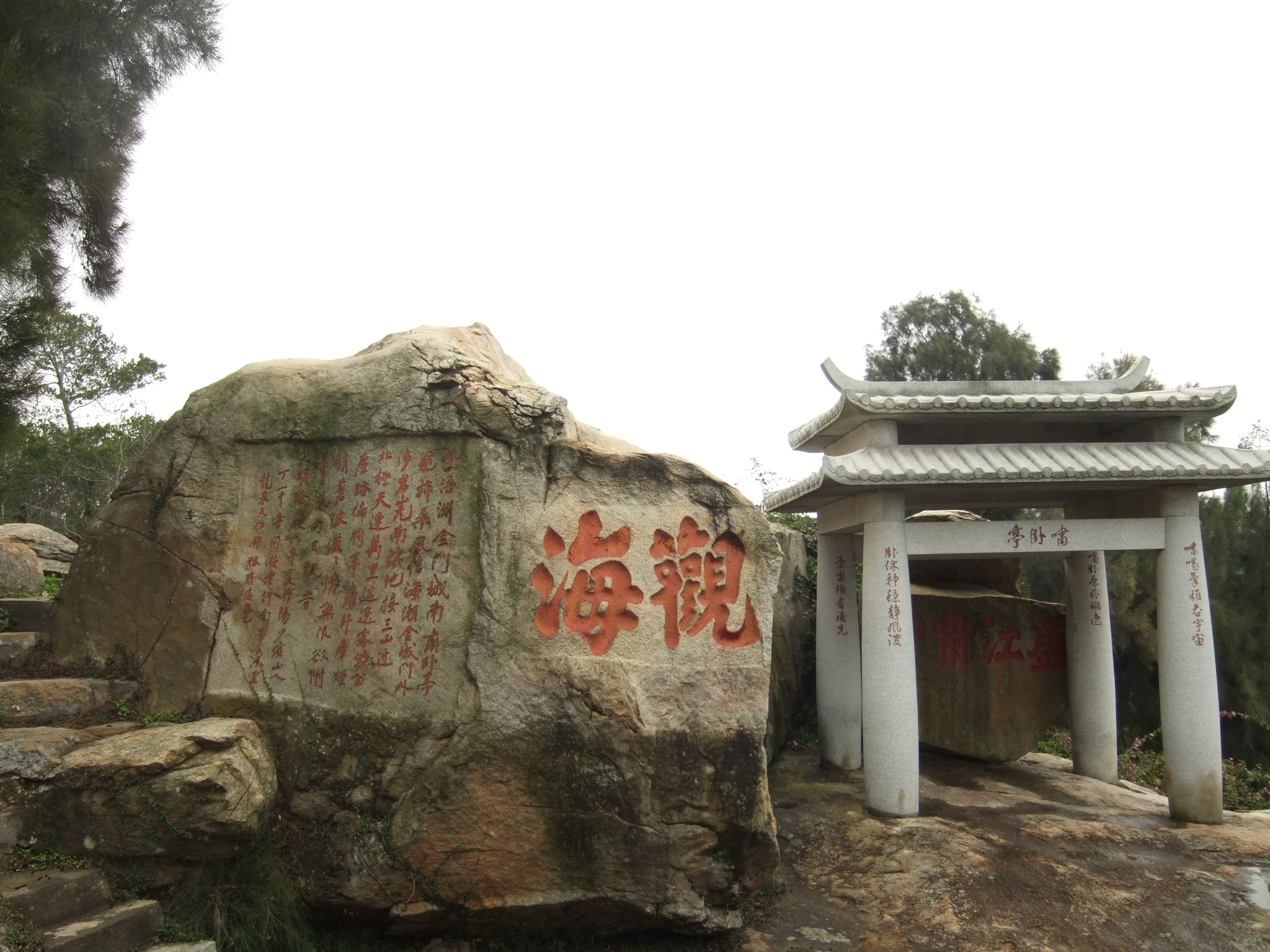
- Interactive map of Xujiang Xiaowo Stone Inscription
- 25°09′56.4″N 121°26′48.1″E
- Type: epigraphy
- Location: Jincheng, Kinmen, Taiwan

The Xujiang Xiaowo Stone Inscription (traditional Chinese: 虛江嘯臥碣群; simplified Chinese: 虚江啸卧碣群; pinyin: Xūjiāng Xiàowò Jiéqún) is an epigraphy in Jincheng Township, Kinmen County, Taiwan.

== History ==
During the Ming Dynasty under Jiajing Emperor, Yu Dayou was appointed as the battalion commander and assigned to guard Kinmen. During his term, he was inspired to recite poetry. He engraved the words Xujiang Xiaowo (Chinese: 虛江嘯臥) on a big boulder. When his deputy commander Yang Hongju took over the task to guard Kinmen, Yang engraved the words Dizhu on nearby rocks. He also built a pavilion in front of the boulder and hung the inscription Houle which was then known as the Xiaowo Pavilion. The pavilion was then once destroyed but was soon restored.

In 1728, a garrison commander Lu Ruilin inscribed the words Ruhua on the left of Yang's epitaph. Zhujie of Yanshan inscribed the words Daguan at the higher part. To the right of Yang's epitaph, there are the words Guanhai. There are also two poems engraved on the stone tablets made by Ding Yizhong and Xu Nanfeng during their visit to Kinmen and a chronicle of Xiaowo Pavilion made by Yang Hongju.

== See also ==
- List of tourist attractions in Taiwan
