= Zhushan Village =

Village in Taiwan

Coordinates: 24°24′01″N 118°19′17″E

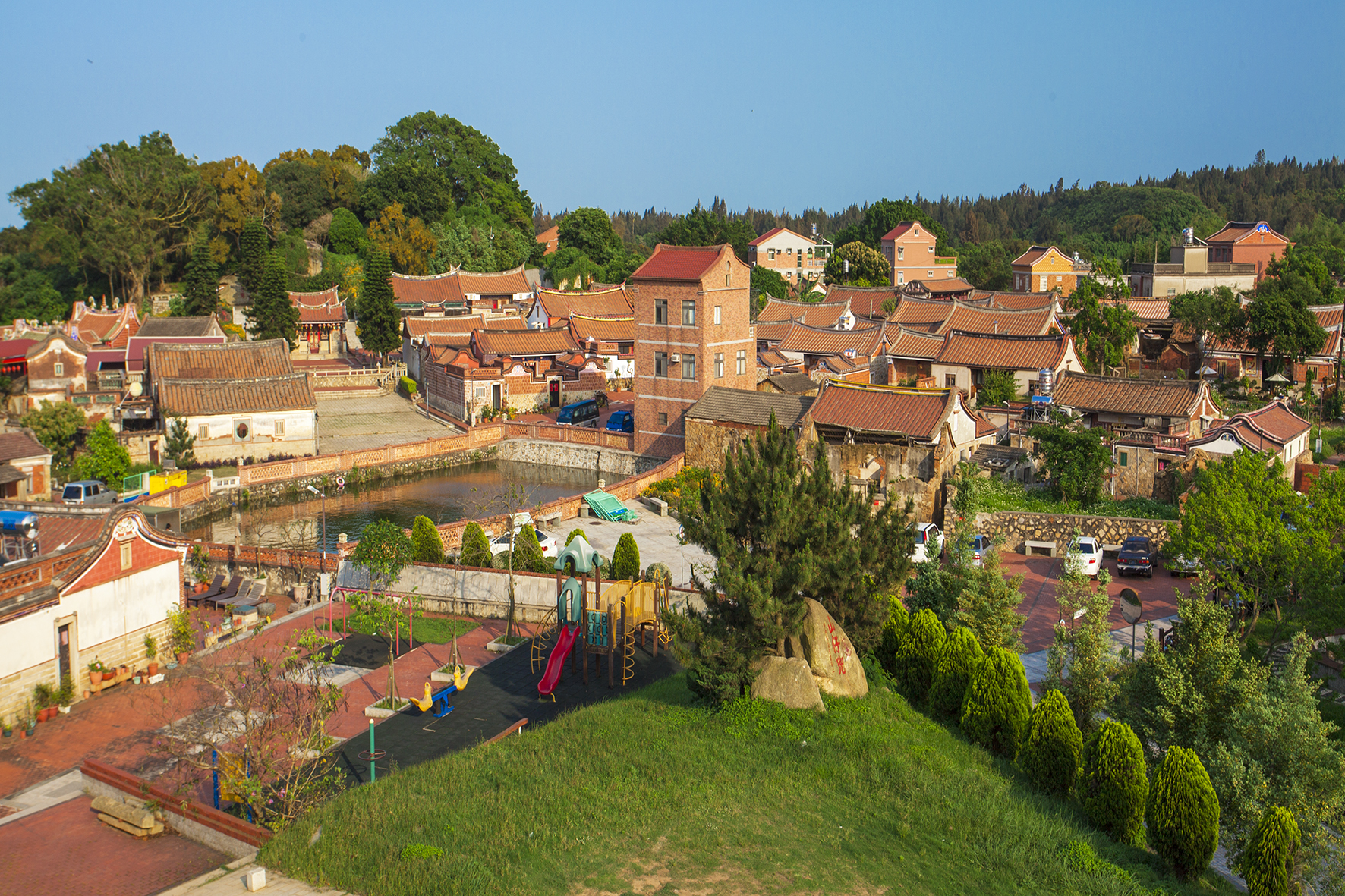
Zhushan Village

Zhushan (Chinese: 珠山聚落; pinyin: Zhūshān Jùluò) is a village in Zhusha urban village of Jincheng Township, Kinmen County, Fujian Province, Republic of China. It is also the home of the Xue clan in Kinmen.

== See also ==
- Village (Taiwan)
