= Beihai Tunnel (Beigan) =

Tunnel in Beigan, Lienchiang, Taiwan

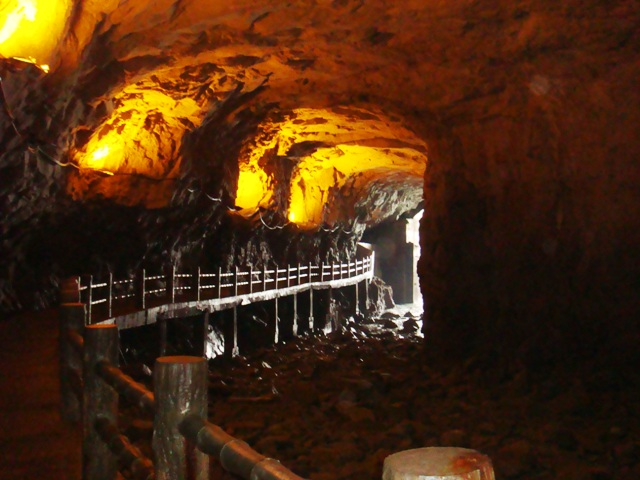
- Interactive map of Beihai Tunnel

Overview
- Official name: 北海坑道
- Location: Beigan, Lienchiang, Taiwan
- Coordinates: 26°12′46.9″N 119°58′57.1″E

Operation
- Opened: 1968

Technical
- Length: 550 m (1,800 ft)
- Width: 9–15 meters

The Beihai Tunnel (Chinese: 北海坑道; pinyin: Běihǎi Kēngdào) is a tunnel in Banli village, Beigan Township, Lienchiang County, Taiwan.

== History ==
The tunnel was opened in 1968 for amphibious landing, 10 years after the end of the Second Taiwan Strait Crisis between the Republic of China Armed Forces and the People's Liberation Army. The construction lasted for around 3 years and claimed the lives of over 100 soldiers. After the Matsu National Scenic Area Administration was established, it took over the management of the tunnel. It renovated the interior of the tunnel and neighboring tourist spots, building an access road and protective railings.

== Features ==
The tunnel is 550 meters long and 9–15 meters wide. Visitors were once able to ride canoe along the tunnel but for several years the site has been closed to visitors due to falling rocks rendering it dangerous.

== See also ==
- List of tourist attractions in Taiwan
- Zhaishan Tunnel
- Beihai Tunnel (Nangan)
- Beihai Tunnel (Dongyin)
