= Beihai Tunnel (Dongyin) =

Tunnel in Dongyin, Lienchiang, Taiwan

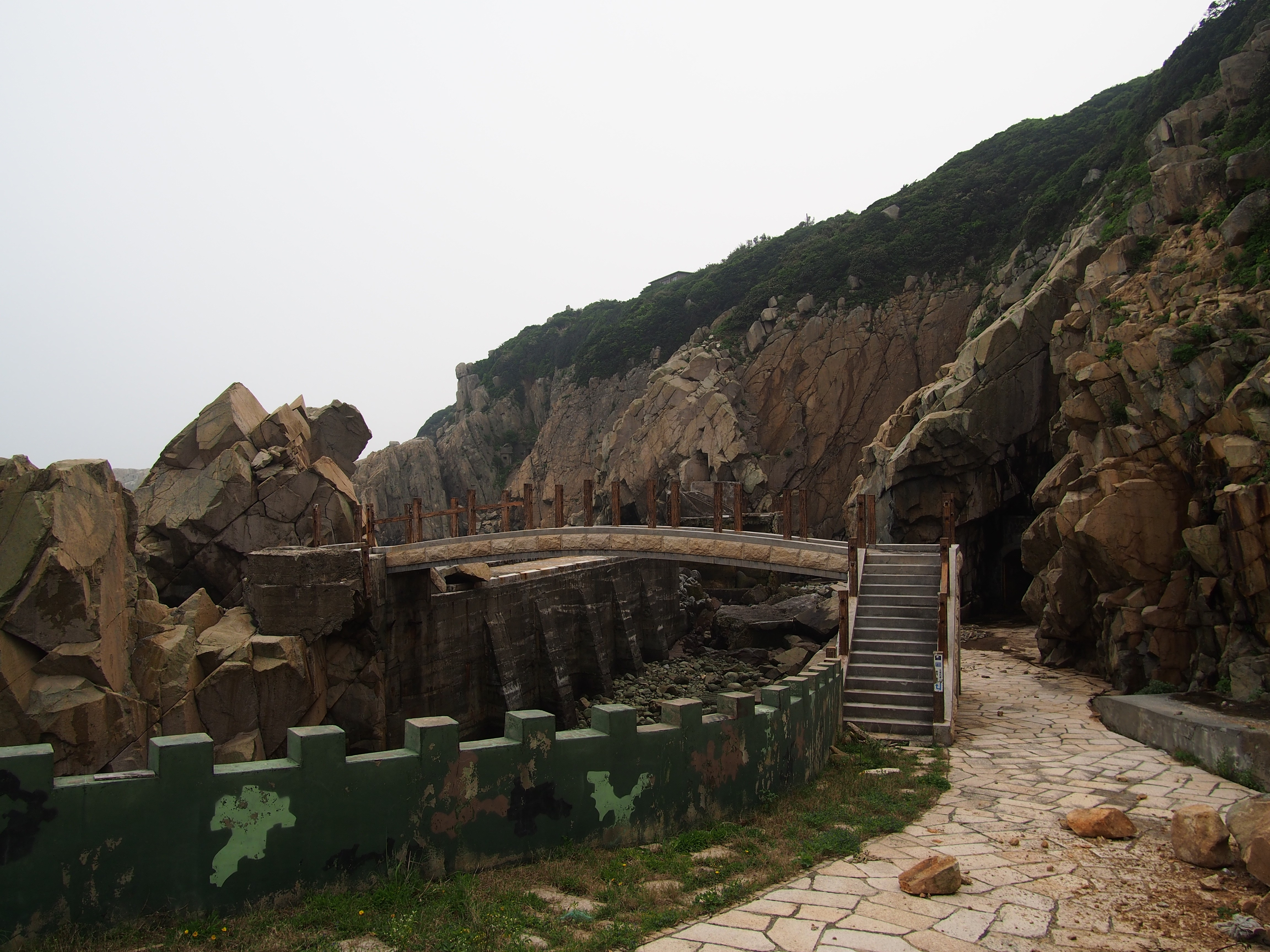
- Interactive map of Beihai Tunnel

Overview
- Official name: 北海坑道
- Location: Dongyin, Lienchiang, Taiwan
- Coordinates: 26°21′33.9″N 120°29′08.0″E
- Start: 1968
- End: 1970

Technical
- Length: 148 m (486 ft)

The Beihai Tunnel (Chinese: 北海坑道; pinyin: Běihǎi Kēngdào) is a tunnel in Dongyin Township, Lienchiang County, Taiwan.

== History ==
The armed forces started the construction of the tunnel in 1968 and completed it in 1970. It was constructed by hand and dynamite. In February 2001, the tunnel was handed over to Matsu National Scenic Area Administration which then renovated it. The tunnel was opened to the public in August 2001.

== Architecture ==
The tunnel spans over 193 meters long, 10 meters wide and 12 meters high. At the end of the tunnel, there are statues of eight workers who perished during the construction.

== See also ==
- List of tourist attractions in Taiwan
- Zhaishan Tunnel
- Beihai Tunnel (Beigan)
- Beihai Tunnel (Nangan)
