= Beihai Tunnel (Nangan) =

Tunnel in Nangan, Lienchiang, Taiwan

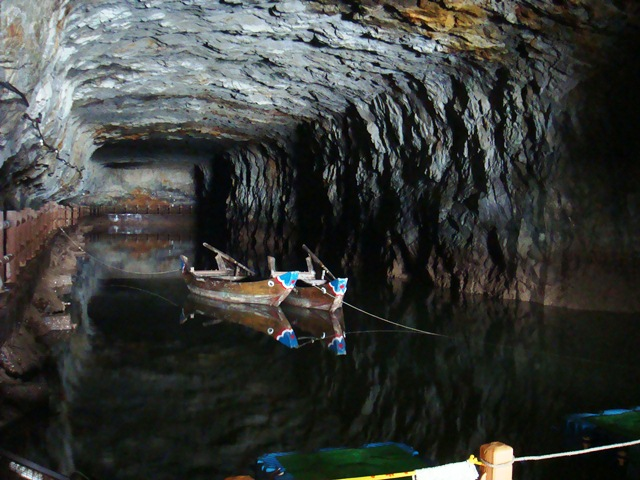
- Interactive map of Beihai Tunnel

Overview
- Official name: 北海坑道
- Location: Nangan, Lienchiang, Taiwan
- Coordinates: 26°8′35.06″N 119°55′44.88″E

Operation
- Work began: 1969
- Opened: 1971
- Rebuilt: 1992
- Reopened: 2000

Technical
- Length: 700 m (2,300 ft)

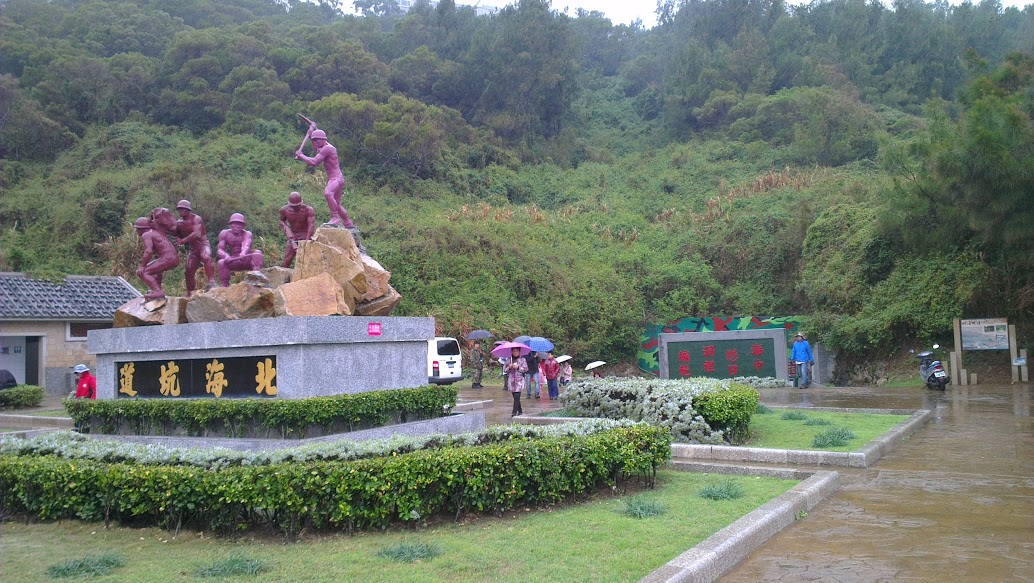
Beihai Tunnel entrance

The Beihai Tunnel (Chinese: 北海坑道; pinyin: Běihǎi Kēngdào) is a tunnel in Nangan Township, Lienchiang County, Taiwan. It is located between the villages of Ren-ai and Meishi. The tunnel runs from Tieban Coast deep into the heart of the hills in lattice shape.

== History ==
The tunnel was constructed in 1969-1971 by the Republic of China Armed Forces for ships to avoid bad weather and attacks from the People's Liberation Army in the aftermath of Second Taiwan Strait Crisis in 1958. It took 820 days for the tunnel to be completed which were mostly done by hand, with some exception of small amount of explosive. Some of the workers lost their lives during the construction process. At that time, the tunnel could harbor 120 small naval vessels but it was badly damaged after a severe typhoon hit the area.

After the return of Matsu Islands from military to civilians in 1992, the tunnel was remodeled and opened to the public in 2000.

== Geology ==
The tunnel is 700 meters in length. It goes deep into the granite mountain and there is a waterway with 18 meters in height, 10 meters in width and 640 meters in length. Water inside the tunnel goes as deep as 4 meters during low tide and 8 meters during high tide.

== See also ==
- List of tourist attractions in Taiwan
- Zhaishan Tunnel
- Beihai Tunnel (Beigan)
- Beihai Tunnel (Dongyin)
