= Juguang Tower =

Building in Jincheng, Kinmen, Taiwan

- 莒光樓
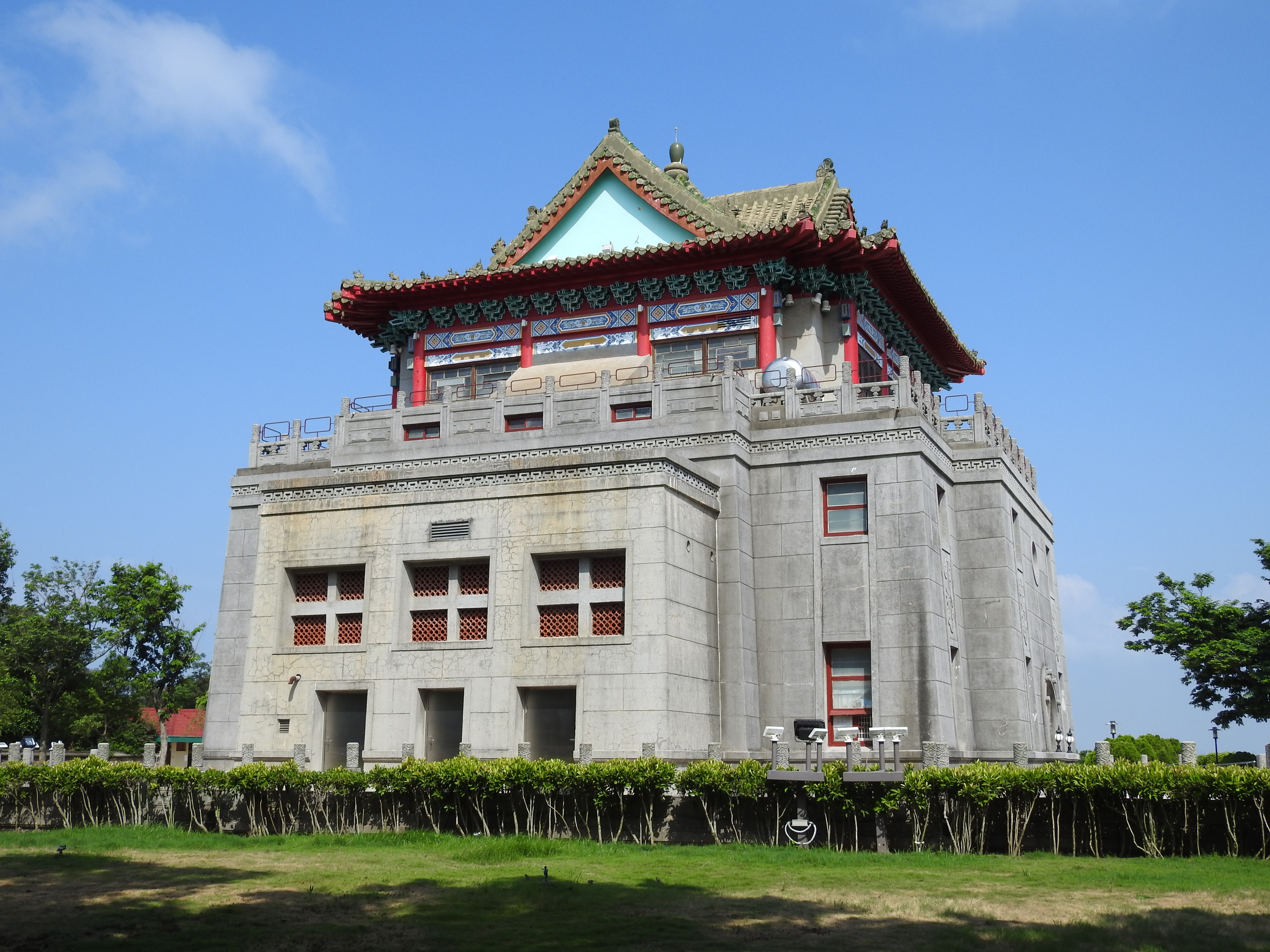
- Interactive map of the Juguang Tower area

General information
- Type: tower
- Location: Jincheng, Kinmen, Fukien, ROC
- Coordinates: 24°25′29.9″N 118°19′08.4″E
- Construction started: 1952
- Completed: 1953

Technical details
- Floor count: 3
- Floor area: 6,612 m^{2}

Design and construction
- Architect: Sheng Xuie-hai

The Juguang Tower (Chinese: 莒光樓; pinyin: Jǔguāng Lóu; Pe̍h-ōe-jī: Kí-kong Lâu) is a tower in Jincheng Township, Kinmen County, Fukien Province, Republic of China (Taiwan).

== History ==
The construction of the tower started in 1952 and was completed in the fall of 1953. It was built to commemorate the fallen armed forces during the Battle of Guningtou 4 years earlier.

== Architecture ==
Juguang Tower at night, 2011

The tower ground covers an area of 6,612 m^{2}. The tower was built with a traditional Chinese style with two cannons at the front of the tower, symbolizing the turbulent history of Kinmen. The architect who designed the tower is Sheng Xuie-hai (沈學海). It is a three-story building with a cultural gallery inside it displaying documents and materials about the history and current status of Kinmen.

== See also ==
- List of tourist attractions in Taiwan
