= Kinmen Fisheries Research Institute =

Research center in Jincheng, Kinmen, Taiwan

- 金門縣水產試驗所
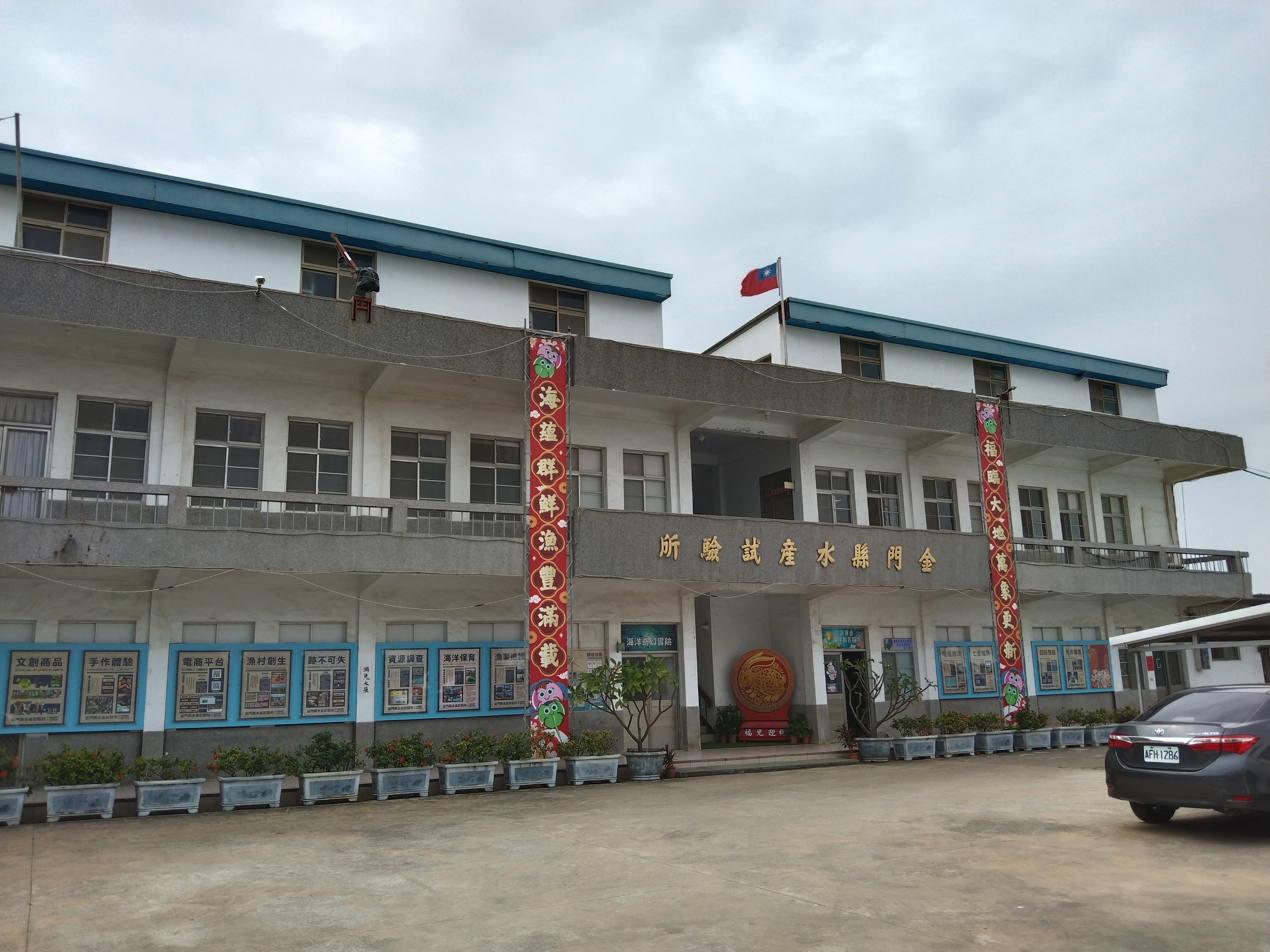

Agency overview
- Formed: 1968
- Jurisdiction: Kinmen
- Headquarters: Jincheng, Kinmen, Taiwan; 24°25′29.4″N 118°18′53.2″E
- Parent agency: Kinmen County Agricultural Research Institute
- Website: Official website

The Kinmen Fisheries Research Institute (KFRI; traditional Chinese: 金門縣水產試驗所; simplified Chinese: 金门县水产试验所; pinyin: Jīnmén Xiàn Shuǐchǎn Shìyàn Suǒ) is a fish research center in Jincheng Township, Kinmen, Taiwan with the aim of protecting biodiversity, balance, sustainable resource management and development of life, production and ecology.

== History ==
The research institute was founded in 1968 by Kinmen County Government.

== Organizational structures ==
- Marine fishery
- Aquaculture
- Administration
- Accounting

== Research ==
The research institute conducts researches on breeding and testing of fish and shellfish, fish disease control, marine resources, ecological surveys, fishery scientific research, development of aquatic food products and fishery consultations."Kinmen County Fisheries Research Institute". Taiwan Medical Travel.

== Architecture ==
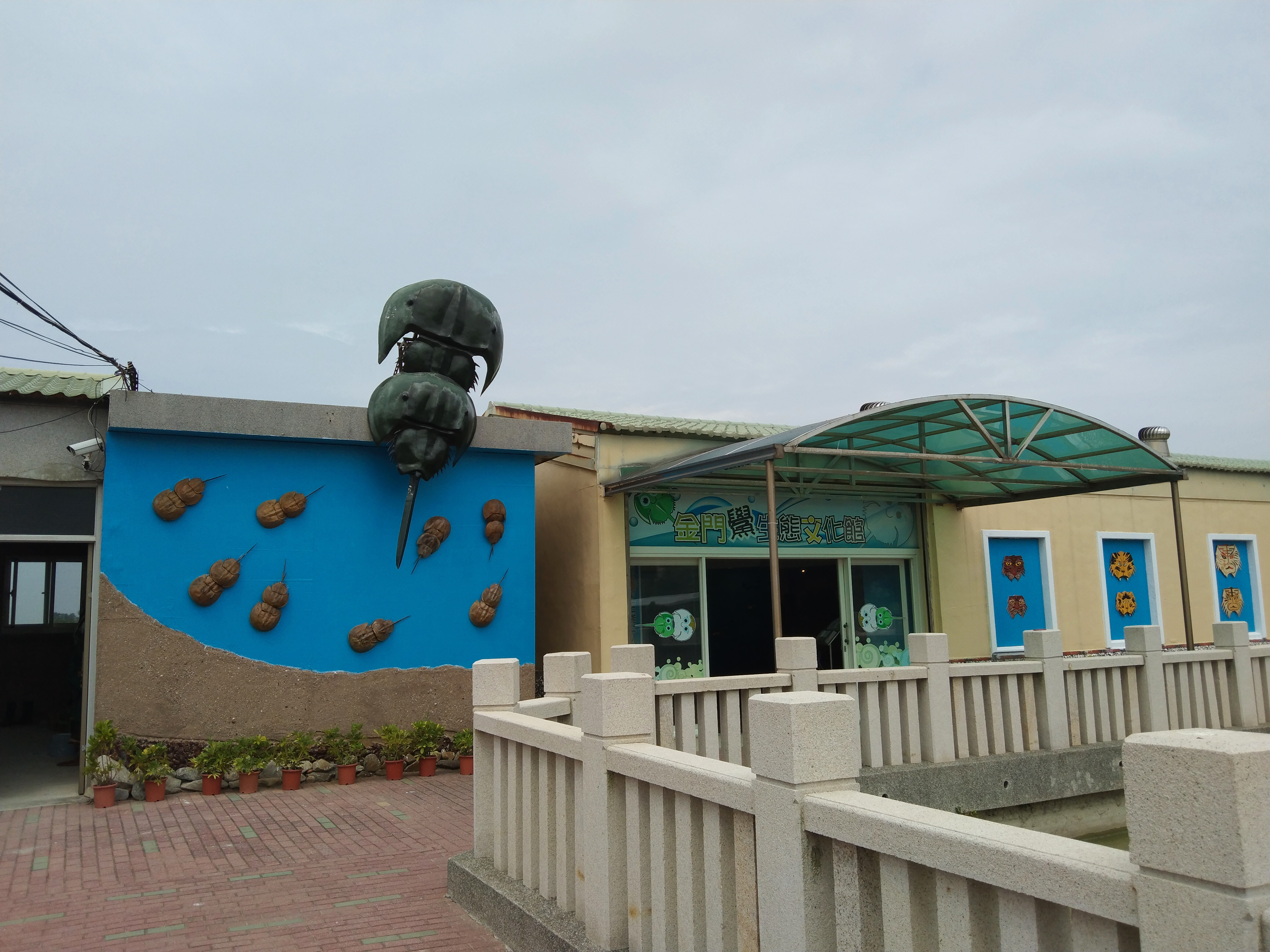
Horseshoe crab ecological cultural center

The institute features the horseshoe crab ecological cultural center.

== See also ==
- Agriculture in Taiwan
