= Longfeng Temple =

Temple in Jinsha, Kinmen County, Taiwan

- 官澳龍鳳宮
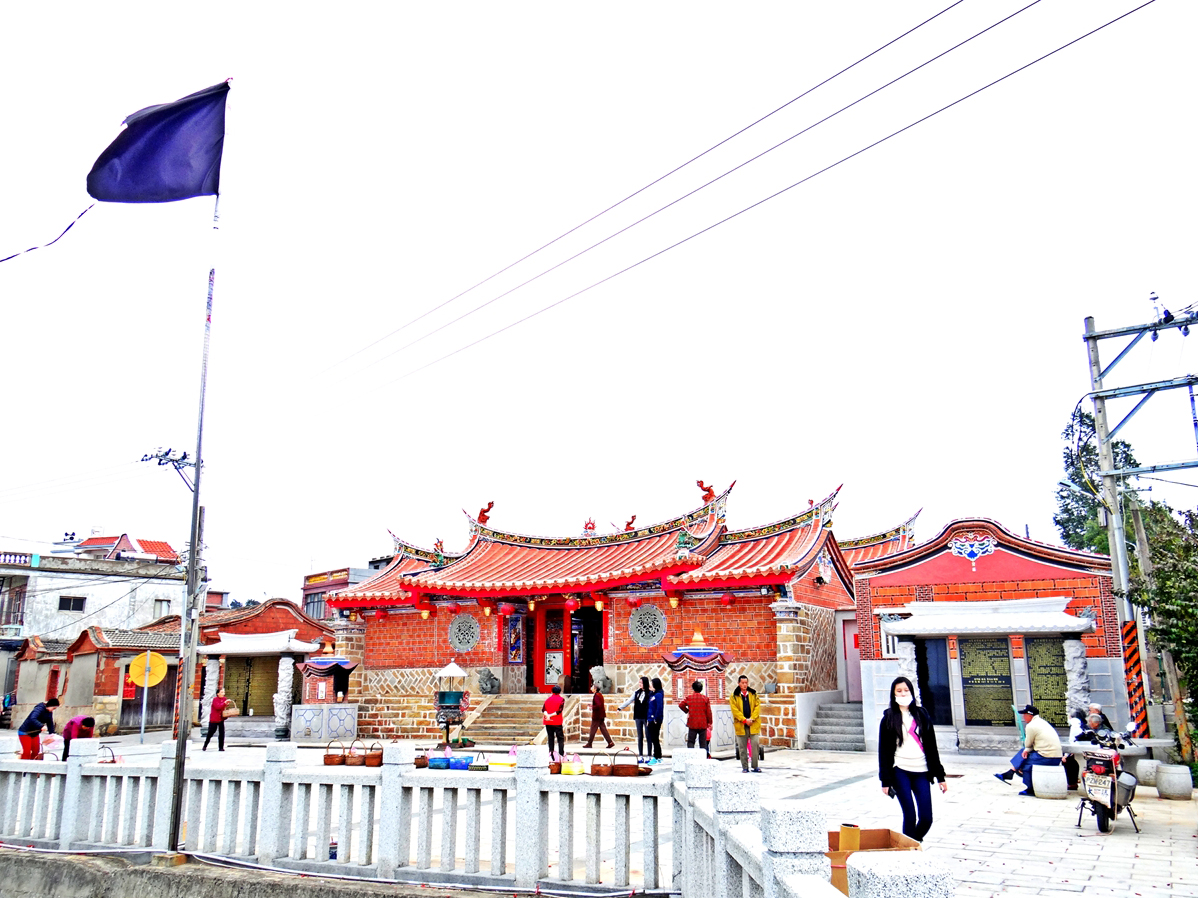
- Temple facade

Religion
- Affiliation: Taoism
- Deity: Mazu

Location
- Location: Jinsha, Kinmen County, Fujian
- Country: Republic of China
- Interactive map of Longfeng Temple
- Coordinates: 24.51821°N 118.4126°E

Architecture
- Completed: 1611
- Direction of façade: West

Guan'ao Longfeng Temple (traditional Chinese: 官澳龍鳳宮; simplified Chinese: 官澳龙凤宫; pinyin: Guān'ào Lóngfèng Gōng; Pe̍h-ōe-jī: Koaⁿ-ò Liông-hōng-kiong) is a temple located in Jinsha Township, Kinmen County, Fujian. The temple's main deity is the sea goddess Mazu.

== History ==
The temple was founded in 1611, making it one of the oldest Mazu temples in Kinmen; at the time, it only housed one Mazu and was known as Tianfei Temple (天妃廟). A nearby temple named Fengshan Temple (鳯山寺), which was dedicated to Guangze Zunwang, was initially located on a beach but collapsed from damage by the ocean. After being moved inland, Fengshan Temple was taken by ROC forces during the Retreat of the Republic of China to Taiwan. Therefore, the statue was moved into Tianfei Temple in 1949, and the temple was renamed to Longfeng Temple. The new name, which translates to "dragon-phoenix temple", is a reference to these two deities.

On September 26, 2007, Longfeng Temple was protected as a county-level monument.

== Worship ==
Longfeng Temple has three statues of Mazu nicknamed Meili, Meihua, and Meilian; each has a different birthdate, but are collectively celebrated on the 23rd day of the third month in the Chinese calendar. There are two statues of Guangze Zunwang. The smaller one is the one originally in Fengshan Temple. The larger one's base and hat is said to have floated to Kinmen from Mainland China and was worshipped without a statue. Then, a straw cape maker claimed that Guangze Zunwang wanted a "body", so a piece of camphor was taken from a dry well and carved into a statue. There is also a statue of Guangong, which used to be placed in another temple named Chicheng Temple (赤埕宮) that was abandoned.

Other statues worshipped include Baosheng Dadi, Guanyin, Zhusheng Niangniang, Shancai Tongzi, Yunü, Liwangye (黎王爺), Xingwangye (邢王爺), Gaowangye (高王爺), Qiuwangye (邱王爺), Yajinggong (壓境公), and Yajingniang (壓境娘).

== Architecture ==
Historically, Longfeng Temple was the primary temple in the area, so the temple was built extravagantly. The rectangular complex has two halls that are seven kaijian (eight columns) wide in a layout that is similar to Ming Dynasty palace architecture. The central courtyard has a stage for plays, likely to protect it from marauding pirates. The interior has a variety of paintings and wooden sculptures of historic value. Most of the structural supports date from when the temple was reinforced in 1970.

== See also ==
- Qianliyan & Shunfeng'er
- List of Mazu temples around the world
- List of temples in Taiwan
