= Kinmen =

County of Fuchien Province, Republic of China

Kinmen 金門縣 Quemoy
- County
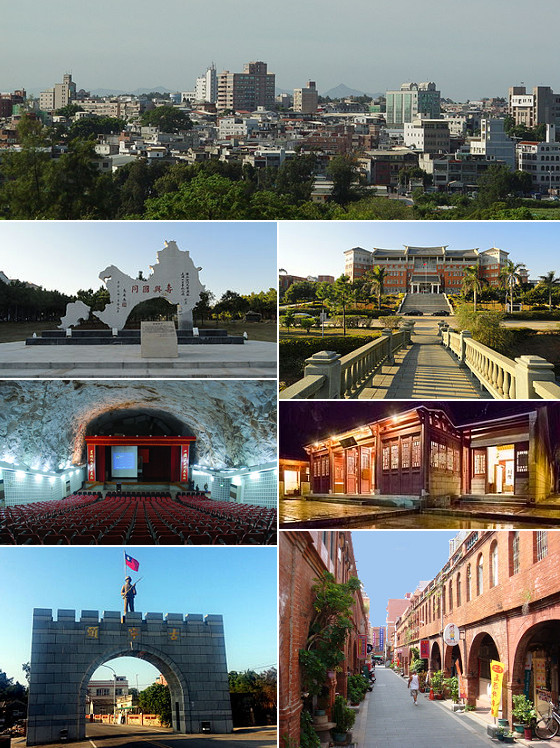

- Flag Logo

- Interactive map of Kinmen
- Location within Taiwan Location within China
- Coordinates: 24°26′N 118°20′E
- Country: Republic of China (Note: Sovereignty disputed by the People's Republic of China. See also Chinese legitimacy question and Political status of Taiwan.)
- Province: Fuchien (Note: Provinces remain a nominal division according to the Taiwanese constitution, but are no longer considered to have any administrative function practically.)
- Seat: Jincheng (Chincheng, Kincheng)
- Largest city: Jincheng
- Townships Villages: 6 (3 urban, 3 rural); 37 (24 urban, 13 rural)

Government
  - Body: Kinmen County Government; Kinmen County Council
  - County Magistrate: Chen Fu-hai

Area (Note: Area figure excludes the Dadeng (Tateng) Islands.)
  - Total: 150.456 km^{2} (58.091 sq mi)
  - Rank: 20 of 22

Population (March 2020)
  - Total: 127,723
  - Rank: 20 of 22
  - Density: 2,777.91/km^{2} (7,194.8/sq mi)
- Demonym: Kinmenese
- Time zone: UTC+8 (NST)
- ISO 3166 code: TW-KIN
- Website: Official website
- Symbols of Kinmen
- Bird: Hoopoe
- Flower: Four-season orchid
- Tree: Cotton tree

Kinmen
- Traditional Chinese: 金門
- Simplified Chinese: 金门
- Postal: Kinmen
Transcriptions
Standard Mandarin
- Hanyu Pinyin: Jīnmén
- Bopomofo: ㄐㄧㄣ ㄇㄣˊ
- Gwoyeu Romatzyh: Jinmen
- Wade–Giles: Chin^{1}-mên^{2}
- Tongyong Pinyin: Jinmén
- Yale Romanization: Jīnmén
- MPS2: Jīnmén
- IPA: [tɕín.mə̌n]
Hakka
- Pha̍k-fa-sṳ: Kîm-mùn
Yue: Cantonese
- Jyutping: Gam^{1}-mun^{4}
Southern Min
- Hokkien POJ: Kim-mn̂g (locally) or Kim-mûi
- Tâi-lô: Kim-mn̂g (locally) or Kim-muî
Eastern Min
- Fuzhou BUC: Gĭng-muòng

Kinmen County
- Traditional Chinese: 金門縣
- Simplified Chinese: 金门县
Transcriptions
Standard Mandarin
- Hanyu Pinyin: Jīnmén Xiàn
- Bopomofo: ㄐㄧㄣ ㄇㄣˊ ㄒㄧㄢˋ
- Gwoyeu Romatzyh: Jinmen shiann
- Wade–Giles: Chin^{1}-mên^{2} Hsien^{4}
- Tongyong Pinyin: Jinmén siàn
- Yale Romanization: Jīnmén syàn
- MPS2: Jīnmén shiàn
- IPA: [tɕín.mə̌n ɕjɛ̂n]
Hakka
- Pha̍k-fa-sṳ: Kîm-mùn-yen
Yue: Cantonese
- Jyutping: Gam^{1}-mun^{4} jyun^{6}
Southern Min
- Hokkien POJ: Kim-mn̂g-koān (locally) or Kim-mûi-koān
- Tâi-lô: Kim-mn̂g-kuān (locally) or Kim-muî-kuān
Eastern Min
- Fuzhou BUC: Gĭng-muòng gâing

Kinmen, alternatively known as Quemoy, is a group of islands and a county of the Republic of China (Taiwan), only 10 km (6 mi) east from the city of Xiamen in Fujian, located at the southeastern coast of the People's Republic of China, from which they are separated by Xiamen Bay. Kinmen is also 187 km (116 mi) west from the closest shoreline of the island of Taiwan across the Taiwan Strait.

The county consists of the major island of Kinmen along with several surrounding islets, as well as Wuqiu Township remotely located 133 km (83 mi) northeast from the rest of the county. Kinmen is one of two counties that constitute Fuchien Province; the other is Lienchiang County (Matsu).

Kinmen's strategic location in the Taiwan Strait has caused numerous confrontations, making it a visible embodiment of political change on cross-strait relations. In August 1958, Kinmen was heavily bombarded by the People's Liberation Army during the Second Taiwan Strait Crisis. Travel restrictions between Kinmen and the main island of Taiwan were lifted in 1994 following the end of decades-long military administration over Kinmen. A direct ferry route to Xiamen was inaugurated in January 2001 following the establishment of the Three Links.

The People's Republic of China claims Kinmen as part of its own Fujian Province and considers Wuqiu to be a separate territory of Fujian apart from Kinmen itself; conversely, the ROC claims the Dadeng Islands (Tateng) as part of Kinmen, even though the PRC has effectively transferred the jurisdiction of those islands to Xiamen.

== Names ==
Kinmen (金門) means 'golden gate'. The name was first recorded in 1387 when the Hongwu Emperor appointed Zhou Dexing to administer the island and protect it from pirate attacks. The spelling "Kinmen" is a postal romanization. This transcription system is a variation of Nanking Syllabary, a system developed by Herbert Giles in 1892. It was adopted by the Chinese Imperial Post, part of the Chinese Maritime Customs Service led by Irishman Robert Hart. It is based on pronunciation in the Southern Mandarin, or Jianghuai, dialect. This dialect is widely spoken in Jiangsu and Anhui provinces, including the city of Nanjing. The Taiwanese Ministry of Foreign Affairs uses "Kinmen," while the United States Board on Geographic Names gives "Kinmen Island." Jinmen is the island's name both in Tongyong Pinyin and in Hanyu Pinyin. Chin-men / Chinmen is the Wade–Giles romanization of the county and island's name.

Quemoy, pronounced /kɪˈmɔɪ/ kih-MOY, is a name for the island in English and in other European languages. It may have originated as a Spanish or Portuguese transcription of the Zhangzhou Hokkien pronunciation of the name, Kim-mûi. This is the most common form of the islands' name in English. For example, works that deal with the First and Second Taiwan Strait Crises (the Quemoy Incident) and the 1960 United States presidential election debates when the islands received prominent worldwide news coverage all use the word Quemoy. In addition, the former National Kinmen Institute of Technology was renamed National Quemoy University in 2010. Kinmen scholar Wei Jian-feng advocates the use of the word Quemoy to better connect the island to "international society or achieve more recognition in the world". Kimoi is a Hokkien-derived spelling also used in the postal romanization system.

== History ==
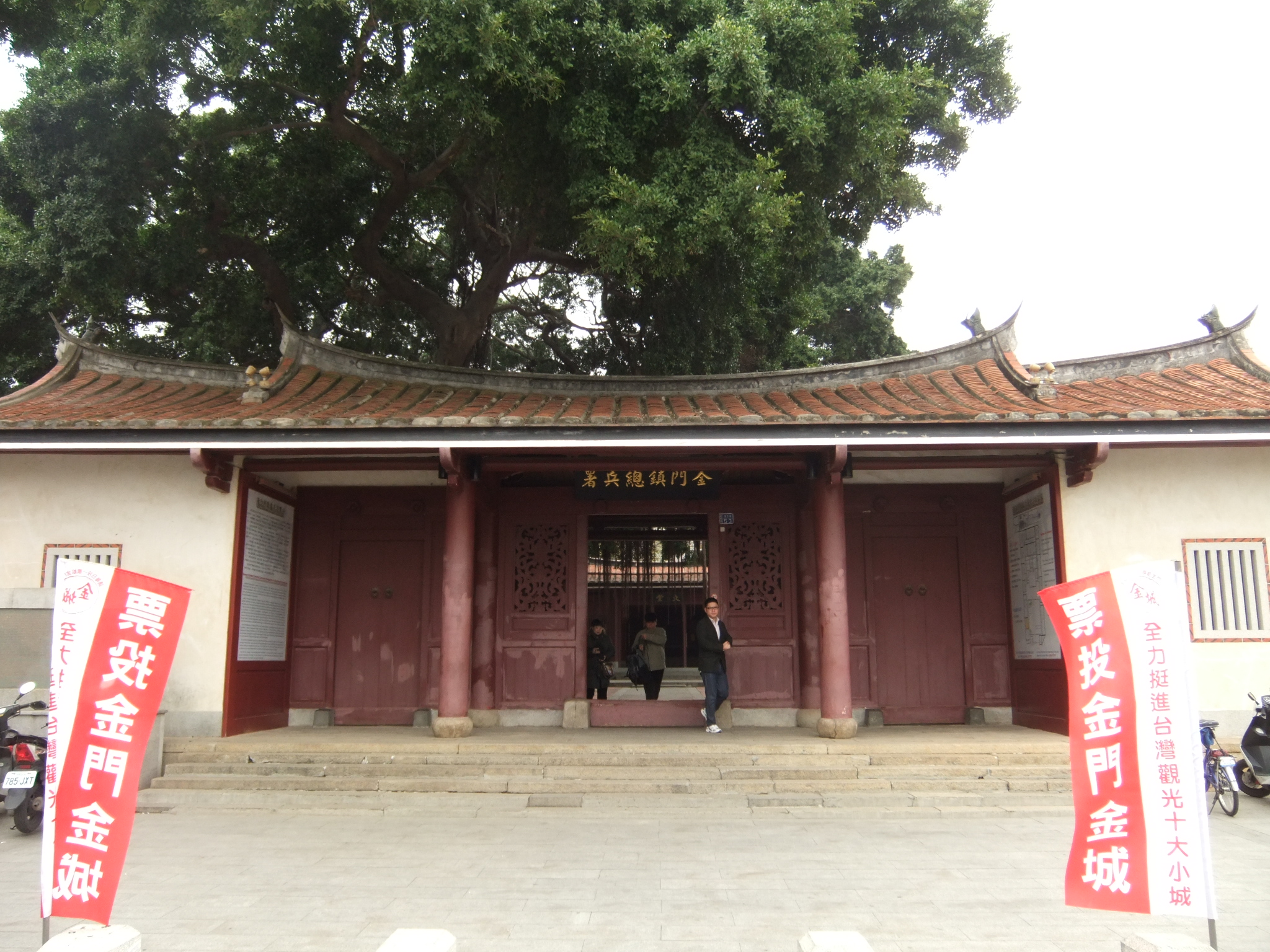
Kinmen Military Headquarters of the Qing Dynasty

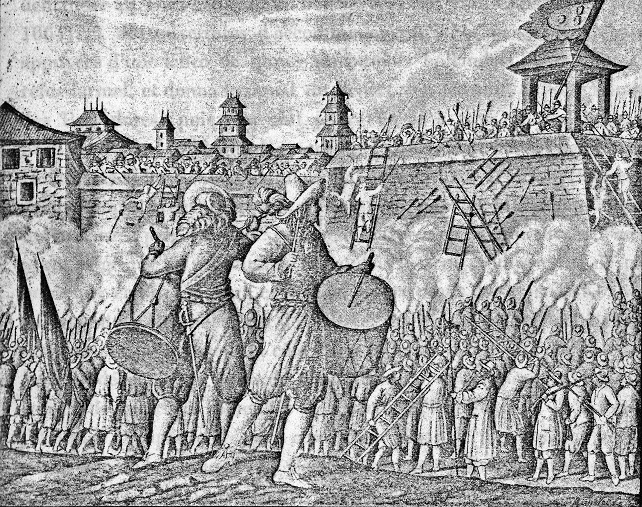
Attack in Quemoy (1663)

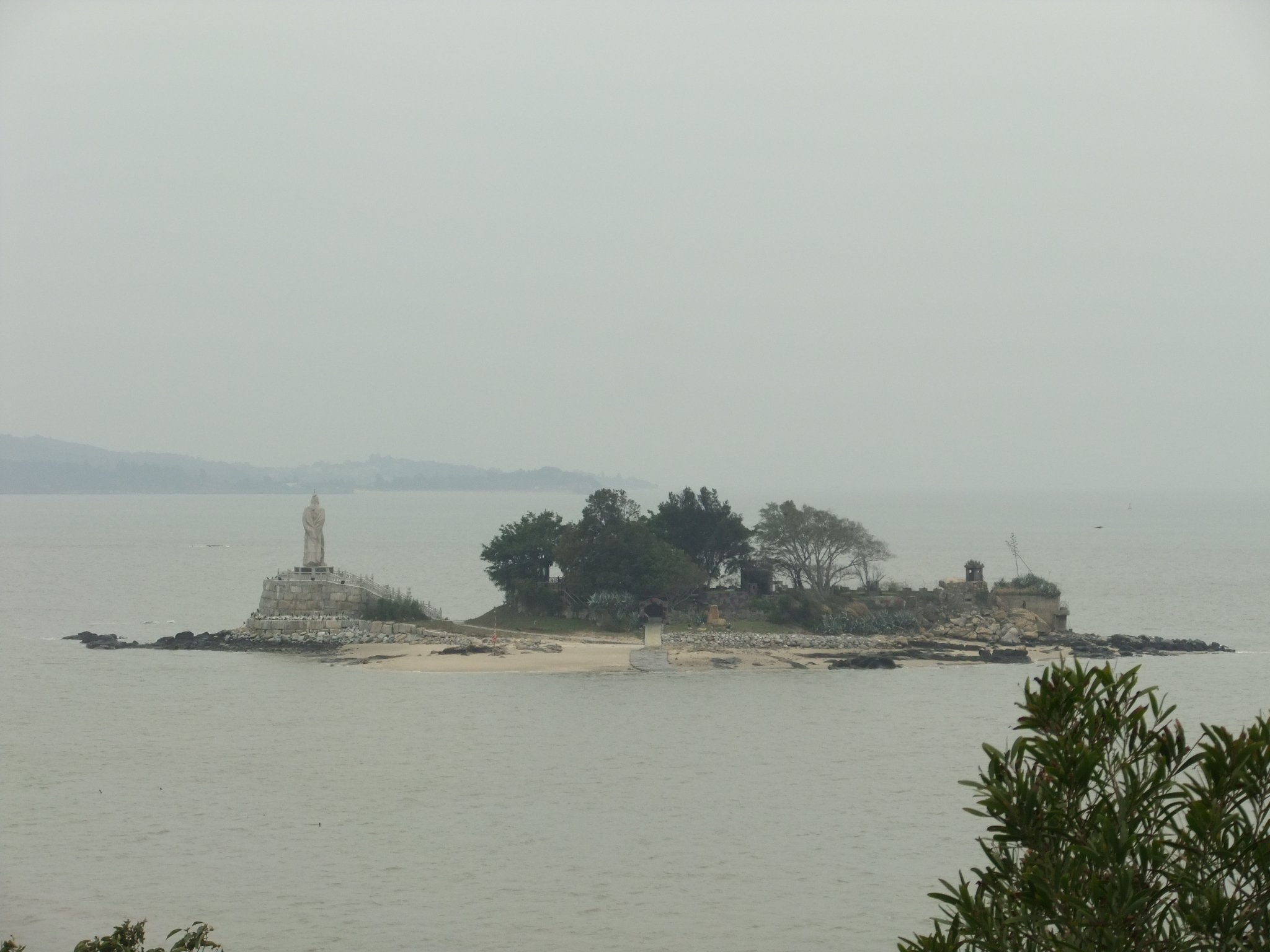
Jiangong Islet, with a Koxinga monument, in Kinmen Harbor

Humans have lived on Kinmen for 5,800 to 8,000 years. During the reign of Emperor Yuan (317 CE), the Five Barbarians invasion of China led six extended families to flee south and they settled in Kinmen, then called Wuzhou. More people settled there during the Tang dynasty, changing the name from Wuzhou to Kinmen.

During the Ming dynasty, more migrants settled in Kinmen. Koxinga used Kinmen as a base to capture Formosa and Penghu from the Dutch. He cut down trees to build his navy, resulting in massive deforestation that made Kinmen vulnerable to soil erosion.

The Prince of Lu, a member of the Southern Ming dynasty, resisted the invading Manchu Qing dynasty forces. In 1651, he fled to Kinmen, which the Qing dynasty took in 1663. During the Qing Dynasty, the Kinmen area was part of Tungan County.

=== 20th century ===
After the establishment of the Republic of China (ROC) in 1912, Kinmen became part of Fujian Province. In 1913, the Kinmen area was made part of Siming County. Kinmen County was established in 1914. In 1928, the county came under direct administration of the provincial government.

The Empire of Japan captured Kinmen in 1937 during the Second Sino-Japanese War. They blockaded the island on 3 September and landed on 23 October. Fighting was light with ROC forces fleeing rather than fighting. The only casualty was sustained by a local self-defense unit. Many of the residents fled to the mainland or to Southeast Asia. The purpose of the Japanese seizure of Kinmen was to use it as a position from which to attack the neighboring city of Xiamen which they would seize in May 1938. Following the seizure of Xiamen many of the locals who had fled there returned to Kinmen.

After the capture of the island the county government went into exile in Dadeng. The Japanese administered Kinmen as a special municipality of Xiamen; the government was composed of locals, people from other parts of occupied China, and Taiwanese.

A poor harvest in 1938 brought challenges for islanders. The Japanese engaged in economic development of the island including through the use of forced labor. KMT forces engaged in two serious attempts to retake the island and kept up a low level campaign against the Japanese. In 1943, insurgents kidnapped two Taiwanese officials who had been overseeing the salt fields and took them to China before executing them. In retaliation the Japanese authorities rounded up 300 young men from the local community eventually executing four.

Towards the end of World War II conditions worsened with Japanese authorities conscripting 500 locals (with their mules) into the military and confiscating household goods. The island came under allied bombing including one attack on 30 August 1944 which killed 19 locals.

==== Post-war ====
World War II ended on 15 August 1945 with the surrender of Japan. Following the end of the war there were attacks by locals against Taiwanese who took shelter with the Japanese garrison. Kinmen was effectively ungoverned until 3 October 1945 when ROC forces landed and installed a new government. A celebration on 10 October marked the end of hostilities. Locals who had survived the war following their conscription by the Japanese were treated as traitors by the KMT occupation authorities.

After the establishment of the People's Republic of China (PRC) by the Chinese Communists in October 1949, Kinmen County was claimed by both the Nationalists and the Communists. Dadeng, Xiaodeng and Jiaoyu were taken by the Communists on 9 October or 15 October 1949. While those islands are still claimed by the ROC, they are governed as part of Dadeng Subdistrict, Xiang'an District, Xiamen, Fujian, China.

On 25 October 1949, People's Liberation Army (PLA) forces landed on Kinmen Island near Guningtou beginning the Battle of Kuningtou. ROC forces successfully defended the island and prevented an attack on Taiwan.

At the outbreak of the Korean War in 1950, retired Admiral Charles M. Cooke Jr., advisor to President Chiang Kai-shek, opposed withdrawing ROC forces from Quemoy (Kinmen). On 26 July 1950, ROC forces on Dadan Island (Tatan), in total 298 soldiers, repulsed an attack (大擔島戰役) from a People's Liberation Army force of 700 soldiers that landed on the island. General Douglas MacArthur and other US officials supported ROC efforts to defend the islands.

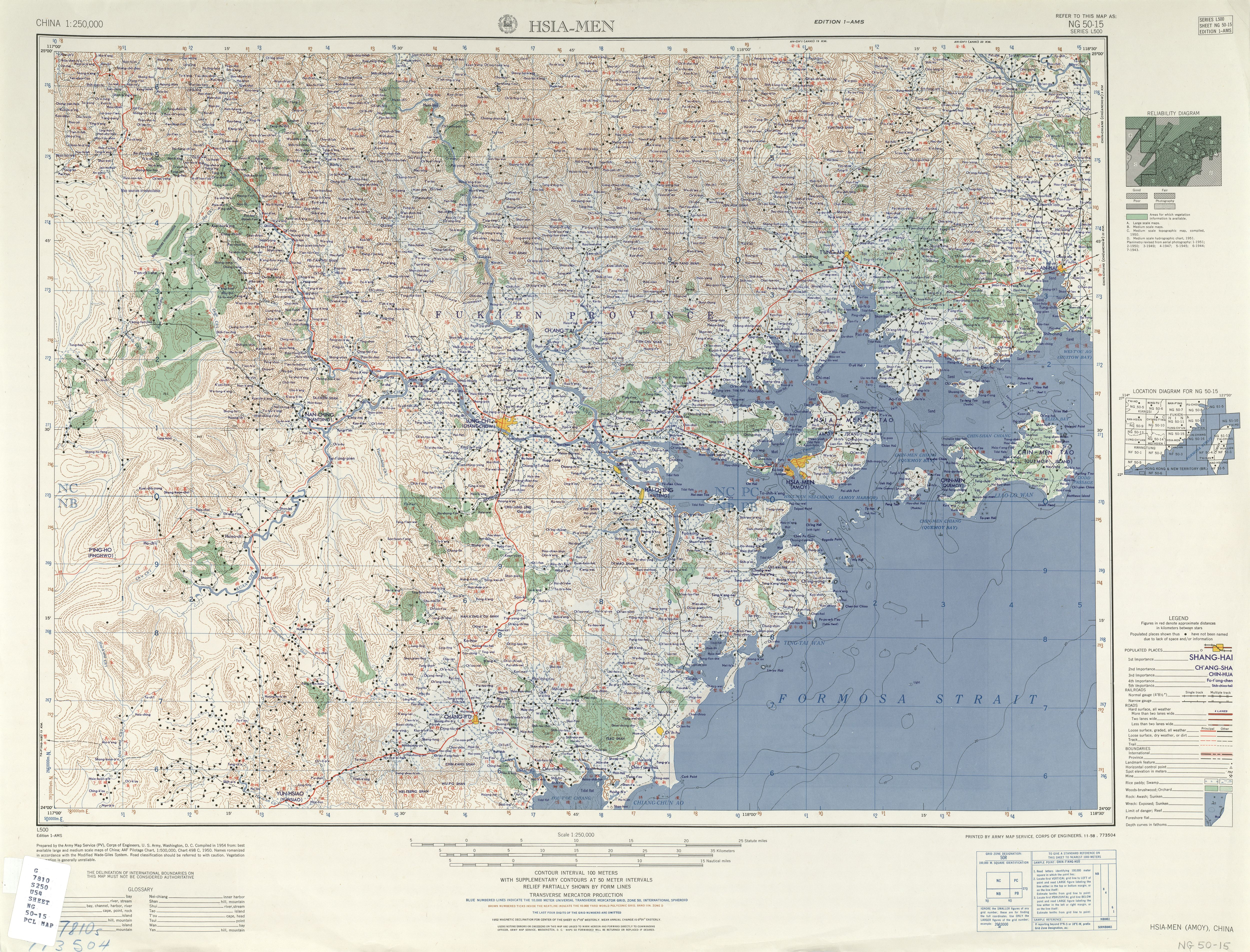
Map including most of the territory of Kinmen County (AMS, 1954)

The PLA extensively shelled the island during the First and Second Taiwan Strait crises in 1954–1955 and 1958 respectively. In 1954, the United States considered responding by using nuclear weapons against the PRC. Again in 1958, General Nathan Farragut Twining and the Joint Chiefs of Staff believed that the United States should not permit the loss of the islands to the communists and recommended to President Eisenhower the use of whatever force was necessary, including atomic weapons.

The phrase "Quemoy and Matsu" became part of American political language in the 1960 U.S. presidential election. During the debates, both candidates, Vice President Richard Nixon and Senator John F. Kennedy, pledged to use American forces if necessary to protect Taiwan from invasion by the PRC, which the United States did not recognize as a legitimate government. But in the second debate on 7 October 1960, the two candidates presented different opinions about whether to use American forces to protect Taiwan's forward positions, Quemoy and Matsu, also. Senator Kennedy stated that these islands – as little as 9 kilometres (5.5 mi) off the coast of China and as much as 170 kilometres (106 mi) from Taiwan – were strategically indefensible and were not essential to the defense of Taiwan. Vice President Nixon maintained that since Quemoy and Matsu were in the "area of freedom," they should not be surrendered to the Communists as a matter of principle.

Earlier in the debate, Nixon argued that they had stopped the Iron Curtain from spreading in places such as Quemoy and Matsu, as well as in Lebanon. Later in the debate, Edward P. Morgan asked Kennedy about a comment that Quemoy and Matsu were "unwise places to draw our defense line in the Far East", and if pulling back would be considered appeasement.

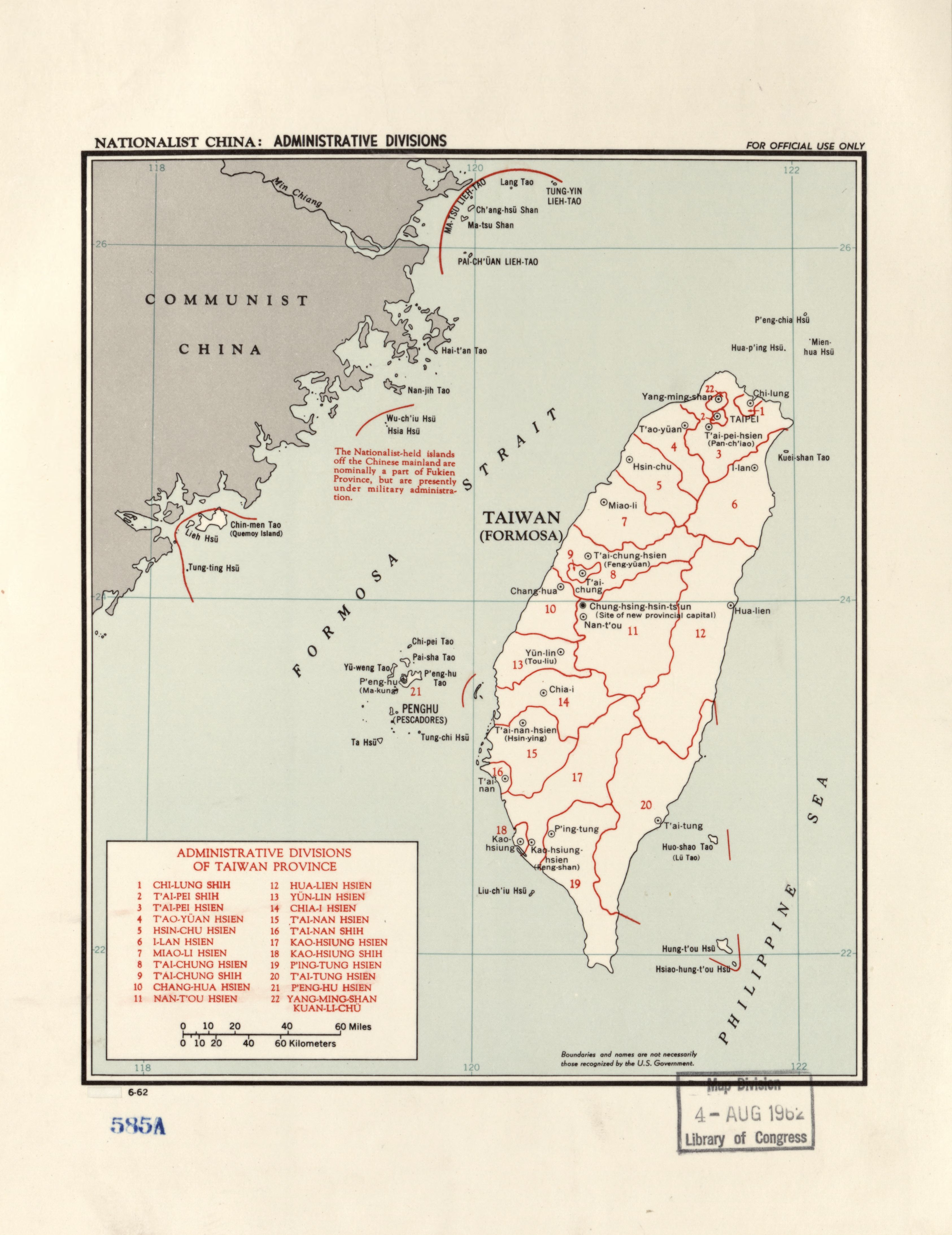
Chin-men Tao (Quemoy Island, Greater Kinmen), Lieh Hsü (Lesser Kinmen), Tung-ting Hsü (Dongding Island), Wu-ch'iu Hsü (Daqiu), and Hsia Hsü (Xiaoqiu) "The Nationalist-held islands off the Chinese mainland are nominally a part of Fukien Province, but are presently under military administration." (1962)

In response, Kennedy argued that Quemoy and Matsu were "five or six miles (Note: The northern coast of Greater Kinmen (Quemoy) is about five or six miles from the nearest point on mainland Asia in places. In the Matsu Islands, Gaodeng Island is 5.75 miles from the Beijiao Peninsula. Some ROC-controlled areas are closer than five miles from PRC-controlled areas. For instance, Jiaoyu in Dadeng Subdistrict is a little more than one mile from the tip of Greater Kinmen in Jinsha Township.) off the coast of Red China within a general harbor area, and more than a hundred miles (Note: Wuqiu, Kinmen is about eighty miles from the closest point on the main island of Taiwan (Formosa). Juguang, Lienchiang and Dongyin, Lienchiang are a little more than ninety miles from the closest point. The main islands Greater Kinmen (Quemoy) and Nangan (Matsu) are over one hundred miles from Taiwan Island.) from Formosa", and that they would only defend Quemoy and Matsu if the attack were on Formosa in general. He noted that people such as Christian Herter, Raymond A. Spruance, J. Lawton Collins, and Matthew Ridgway all advised against attempting to defend the islands, as the risk of war over them was not worth it due to their strategic indefensibility. He advocated for the Nationalists to be the ones to make the decision to withdraw, and for the U.S. to help them craft a plan aroud Formosa which "leaves 100 miles (Note: The island of Taiwan is separated from the southeast coast of China by the Taiwan Strait, which ranges from 220 km (140 mi) at its widest point to 130 km (81 mi) at its narrowest.) between the sea".

Nixon disagreed, arguing that they had aided South Korea in the Korean War even though it was also previously considered indefensible. He thought that in principle, the Nationalists who had the islands should not be forced to give them up, as that would eventually lead to the Communists taking Formosa, and the logic had previously led to "disaster" in Korea.

After the third debate on 13 October 1960, Kennedy's advisers spoke with then Secretary of State Herter and said Kennedy was willing to revise his position on the Quemoy and Matsu issue so as not to give the Communists the impression that the USA would not stand united against aggression. Nixon pointed out the change in Kennedy's position but decided not to press the point due to the importance of the USA's role in what was an extremely tense situation. Nixon's polls among Republicans and Democrats showed overwhelming support for Nixon's position on the issue.

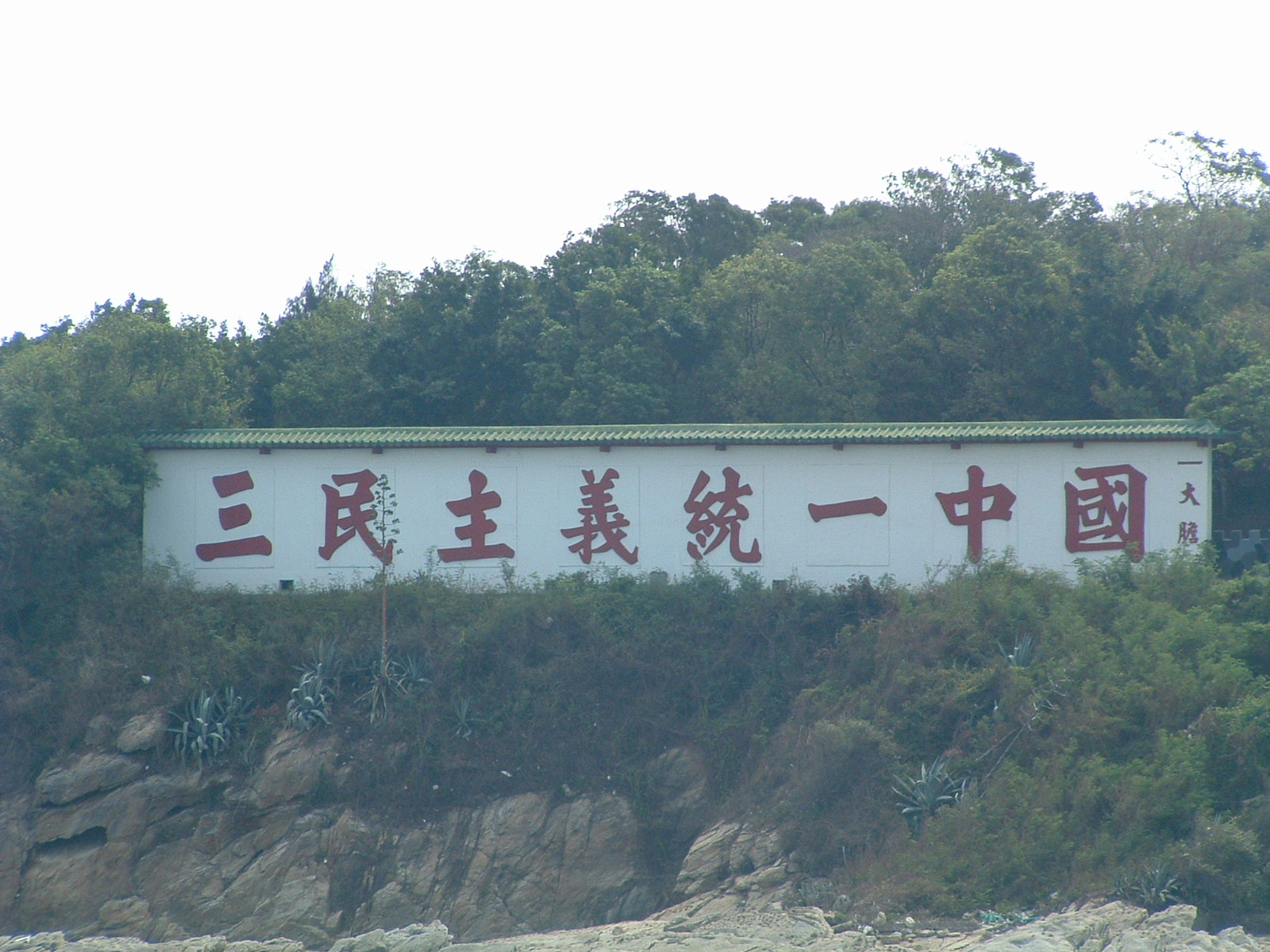
"Three Principles of the People Unify China" Wall built before the 1987 Lieyu massacre on Dadan Island facing mainland China.

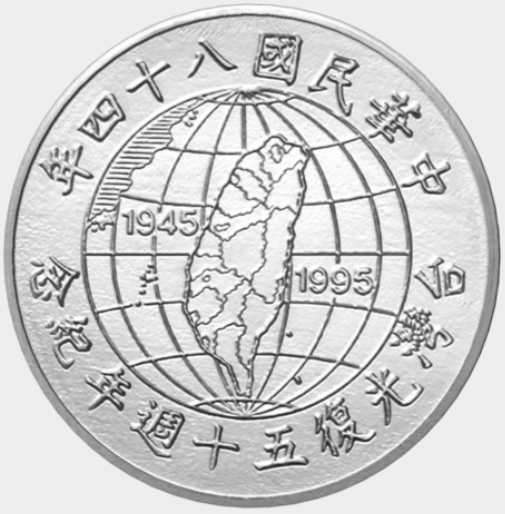
Kinmen in the map on the obverse of the Commemorative NT$10 Coin in Celebration of the 50th Anniversary of Taiwan's Retrocession (1995)

Kinmen was originally a military reserve under the martial law curfews, which eventually led to the tragedies of innocent civilian casualties, such as the 1985 Shi Islet slaughter and the 1987 Lieyu massacre. The island was returned to the civilian government in the mid-1990s, after which travel to and from it was allowed. Direct travel between mainland China and Kinmen re-opened in January 2001 under the mini Three Links, and there has been extensive tourism development on the island in anticipation of mainland tourists. Direct travel was suspended in 2003 as a result of the SARS outbreak, but has since resumed.

Many Taiwanese businessmen use the link through Kinmen to enter mainland China, seeing it as cheaper and easier than entering through Hong Kong. However, this changed following the 2005 Pan–Blue visits to mainland China and the 2008 presidential and legislative victories of the KMT, that allowed easier cross-Strait relations. Kinmen has experienced a considerable economic boom as businessmen relocate to the island for easier access to the vast markets of the PRC.

On 30 June 2014, Dadan Island and Erdan Island were handed over from the military to civilians, represented by Kinmen County Government. Since 1 January 2015, tourists from mainland China could directly apply for the Entry & Exit Permit for Taiwan upon arrival in Kinmen. This privilege also applies to Penghu and Matsu Islands as means to boost tourism in the outlying islands of Taiwan.

On 23 August 2019, the sixty-first anniversary of the beginning of the Second Taiwan Strait Crisis, President Tsai Ing-wen visited the Taiwushan martyrs' shrine (太武山忠烈祠) in Mount Taiwu where she placed flowers and offered incense.

== Geography ==
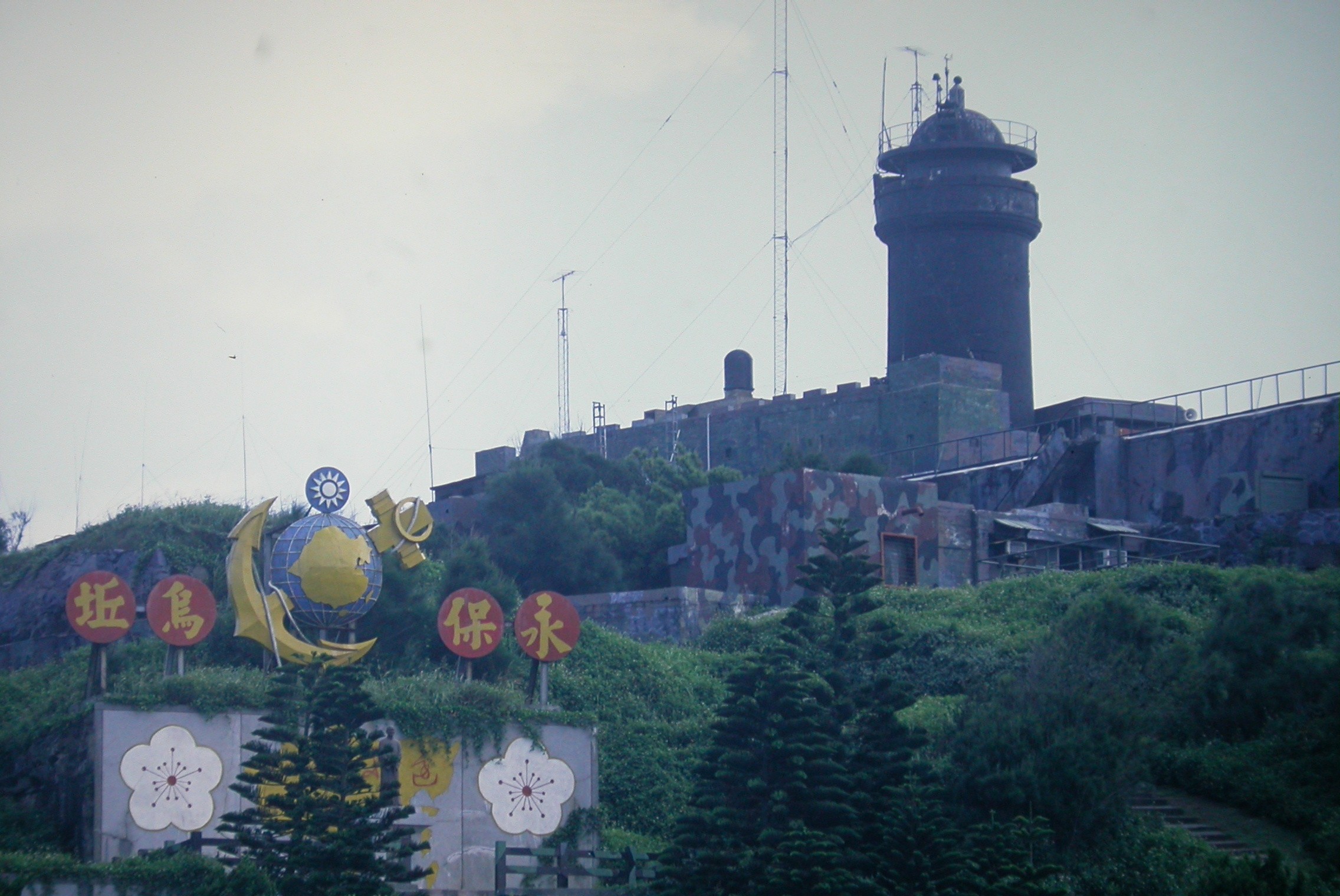
Wuqiu Lighthouse in Wuqiu, Kinmen

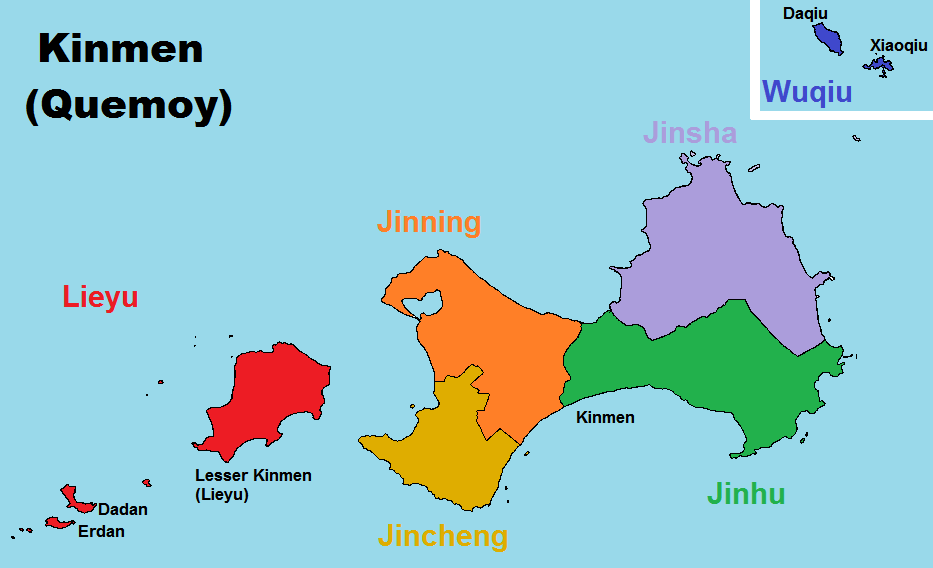
Kinmen County map

The county is made up of numerous islands and islets including:

- Kinmen group
  - Kinmen (Kinmen, Main island; 大金門, 金門本島) (main island; divided into four townships)
  - Dongding Island (Tangtia, Tungting 東碇島, 東椗島) (in Jinhu Township; approximately 35 km (22 mi) to the southwest)
  - Beiding Island (北碇島) (in Jinhu Township; approximately 4 km (2.5 mi) to the east)
  - Cao Islet (Ts'ao Hsü; 草嶼) (in Jinsha Township) 24.523335°N 118.437021°E
  - Hou Islet (后嶼) (in Jinsha Township) 24.529171°N 118.41233°E
  - Jiangong Islet (建功嶼) (in Jincheng Township)
  - Lesser Kinmen (Hsiao Kinmen, Lieyu; 小金門, 烈嶼) (second largest island under ROC control; in Lieyu Township)
  - Dadan Island (大膽島) (in Lieyu Township)
  - Erdan Island (二膽島) (in Lieyu Township)
  - Fuxing Islet (Fuhsing Islet; Phaktia) (復興嶼) (in Lieyu Township)
  - Menghu Islet (Tiger Island, 猛虎嶼) (in Lieyu Township)
  - Shi Islet (Lion Islet) (獅嶼) (in Lieyu Township)
  - Binlang Islet (檳榔嶼) (in Lieyu Township)
  - Dadeng (Tateng) (大嶝/大嶝島) (under PRC control from 9 October or 15 October 1949; part of Dadeng Subdistrict, Xiang'an District, Xiamen, Fujian)
  - Xiaodeng (Hsiaoteng, Siao Deng) (小嶝/小嶝島) (under PRC control from 9 October or 15 October 1949; part of Dadeng Subdistrict, Xiang'an District, Xiamen, Fujian)
  - Jiaoyu/Jiao Yu (Chiao I., 角嶼) (under PRC control from 9 October or 15 October 1949; part of Dadeng Subdistrict, Xiang'an District, Xiamen, Fujian)
- Wuqiu (Ockseu, Wuchiu; 烏坵) group
  - Daqiu (Tachiu, Taciou; 大坵) (in Wuqiu Township)
  - Xiaoqiu (Hsiaochiu; 小坵) (in Wuqiu Township)

== Climate ==
Kinmen's climate is classified as humid subtropical climate (Köppen Cfa, bordering on Cwa). Among them, the annual average temperature is 21.0 °C (69.8 °F), the hottest month in August is 28.5 °C (83.3 °F), and the coldest month is 12.6 °C (54.7 °F) in January. The annual precipitation is 1,089.4 millimetres (42.89 in), of which August is the wettest with 156.3 millimetres (6.15 in), while November is the driest with only 23.5 millimetres (0.93 in). The extreme temperature throughout the year ranged from 1.3 °C (34.3 °F) on January 25, 2016 to 39.1 °C (102.4 °F) on August 31, 2020.

Climate data for Kinmen (Jincheng) (2005–2020 normals, extremes 2004–present)
Month	Jan	Feb	Mar	Apr	May	Jun	Jul	Aug	Sep	Oct	Nov	Dec	Year
Record high °C (°F)	26.2 (79.2)	28.1 (82.6)	31.6 (88.9)	32.1 (89.8)	37.8 (100.0)	38.4 (101.1)	39.1 (102.4)	39.1 (102.4)	38.2 (100.8)	36.7 (98.1)	33.3 (91.9)	27.5 (81.5)	39.1 (102.4)
Mean daily maximum °C (°F)	17.9 (64.2)	18.1 (64.6)	20.1 (68.2)	23.7 (74.7)	27.4 (81.3)	30.1 (86.2)	32.4 (90.3)	32.7 (90.9)	31.9 (89.4)	29.2 (84.6)	25.0 (77.0)	19.9 (67.8)	25.7 (78.3)
Daily mean °C (°F)	13.5 (56.3)	13.6 (56.5)	15.5 (59.9)	19.3 (66.7)	23.4 (74.1)	26.6 (79.9)	28.5 (83.3)	28.6 (83.5)	27.6 (81.7)	24.4 (75.9)	20.6 (69.1)	15.8 (60.4)	21.5 (70.6)
Mean daily minimum °C (°F)	10.9 (51.6)	10.9 (51.6)	12.6 (54.7)	16.6 (61.9)	20.9 (69.6)	24.6 (76.3)	26.3 (79.3)	26.2 (79.2)	24.9 (76.8)	21.6 (70.9)	17.9 (64.2)	13.0 (55.4)	18.9 (66.0)
Record low °C (°F)	1.3 (34.3)	4.1 (39.4)	4.2 (39.6)	8.2 (46.8)	12.8 (55.0)	16.6 (61.9)	23.0 (73.4)	22.9 (73.2)	20.0 (68.0)	14.1 (57.4)	9.5 (49.1)	3.2 (37.8)	1.3 (34.3)
Average precipitation mm (inches)	38.2 (1.50)	52.6 (2.07)	83.4 (3.28)	107.0 (4.21)	175.3 (6.90)	149.8 (5.90)	104.2 (4.10)	126.4 (4.98)	84.9 (3.34)	33.4 (1.31)	52.6 (2.07)	41.8 (1.65)	1,049.6 (41.31)
Average precipitation days	5.3	7.9	11.1	11.8	13.4	12.8	6.2	8.4	6.5	2.3	5.1	4.8	95.6
Average relative humidity (%)	71.6	75.5	76.1	78.9	83.3	87.8	84.1	82.3	75.3	66.9	70.2	68.4	76.7
Mean monthly sunshine hours	128.7	98.5	110.3	116.2	123.8	156.8	252.3	217.2	194.9	189.5	146.1	137.8	1,872.1
Source: Central Weather Bureau

Climate data for Kinmen (Jinhu)
Month	Jan	Feb	Mar	Apr	May	Jun	Jul	Aug	Sep	Oct	Nov	Dec	Year
Mean daily maximum °C (°F)	16.6 (61.9)	16.8 (62.2)	20.1 (68.2)	23.2 (73.8)	26.1 (79.0)	29.5 (85.1)	32.1 (89.8)	32.2 (90.0)	30.7 (87.3)	27.6 (81.7)	23.8 (74.8)	19.7 (67.5)	24.9 (76.8)
Daily mean °C (°F)	12.6 (54.7)	13.0 (55.4)	15.1 (59.2)	19.3 (66.7)	23.1 (73.6)	26.3 (79.3)	28.4 (83.1)	28.5 (83.3)	26.6 (79.9)	23.6 (74.5)	19.4 (66.9)	15.5 (59.9)	21.0 (69.7)
Mean daily minimum °C (°F)	10.0 (50.0)	10.1 (50.2)	12.2 (54.0)	16.4 (61.5)	20.8 (69.4)	23.9 (75.0)	25.9 (78.6)	25.6 (78.1)	24.3 (75.7)	20.9 (69.6)	16.8 (62.2)	12.8 (55.0)	18.3 (64.9)
Average precipitation mm (inches)	34.7 (1.37)	63.5 (2.50)	92.3 (3.63)	118.3 (4.66)	139.8 (5.50)	154.2 (6.07)	127.6 (5.02)	156.3 (6.15)	116.4 (4.58)	38.6 (1.52)	23.5 (0.93)	24.2 (0.95)	1,089.4 (42.88)
Average relative humidity (%)	74.4	76.6	78.4	82.6	83.1	83.8	81.4	80.3	78.4	72.4	71.2	73.5	78.0
Mean monthly sunshine hours	124.6	98.3	96.2	113.2	138.4	182.8	246.1	227.1	188.2	187.1	150.3	151.0	1,903.3
Source: Agricultural Research Institute, Kinmen County

== Geology ==
Kinmen, much like the surrounding Chinese mainland, is predominantly composed of Cretaceous aged granite, with lesser amounts of Eocene-Oligocene sandstone, Miocene basalt and Pleistocene-Holocene conglomerate. The thickness of the sediments varies from 150 metres in the west to only a few metres in the east.

== Demographics ==
Historical population
Year	Pop.	±%
1950	37,682	—
1955	44,882	+19.1%
1960	45,560	+1.5%
1965	54,978	+20.7%
1970	61,008	+11.0%
1975	59,668	−2.2%
1980	51,883	−13.0%
1985	48,846	−5.9%
1990	42,754	−12.5%
1995	47,394	+10.9%
2000	53,832	+13.6%
2005	76,491	+42.1%
2010	97,364	+27.3%
2015	132,799	+36.4%
2020	140,597	+5.9%
2025	139,313	−0.9%
Source: 1. 金門縣現住人口 (1950-1968) (pdf). 金門統計年報 (Report) (in Chinese (Taiwan)). Vol. 中華民國57年(58. 6). 金門縣政府主計室. June 1969. pp. 26–27.; 2. 金門縣現住人口 (1955-1980) (pdf). 金門統計年報 (Report) (in Chinese (Taiwan)). Vol. 中華民國69年[70. 9]. 金門縣政府主計室. September 1981. pp. 26–27.; 3. 縣市人口按性別及五齡組(63). 內政部戶政司.

View source data.

== Culture ==
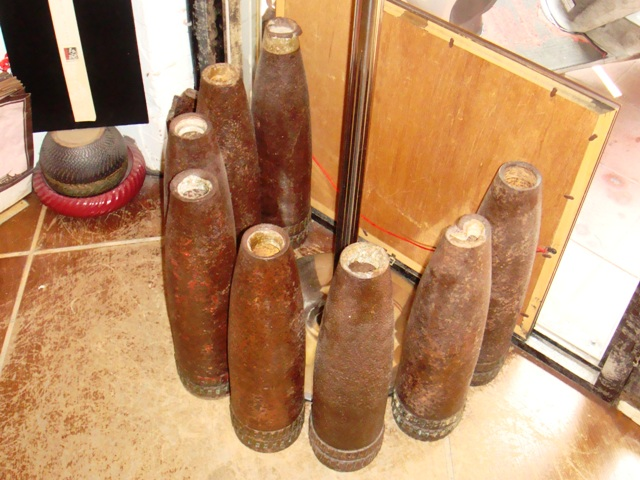
Artillery shells fired by the People's Liberation Army to Kinmen in the 1950s

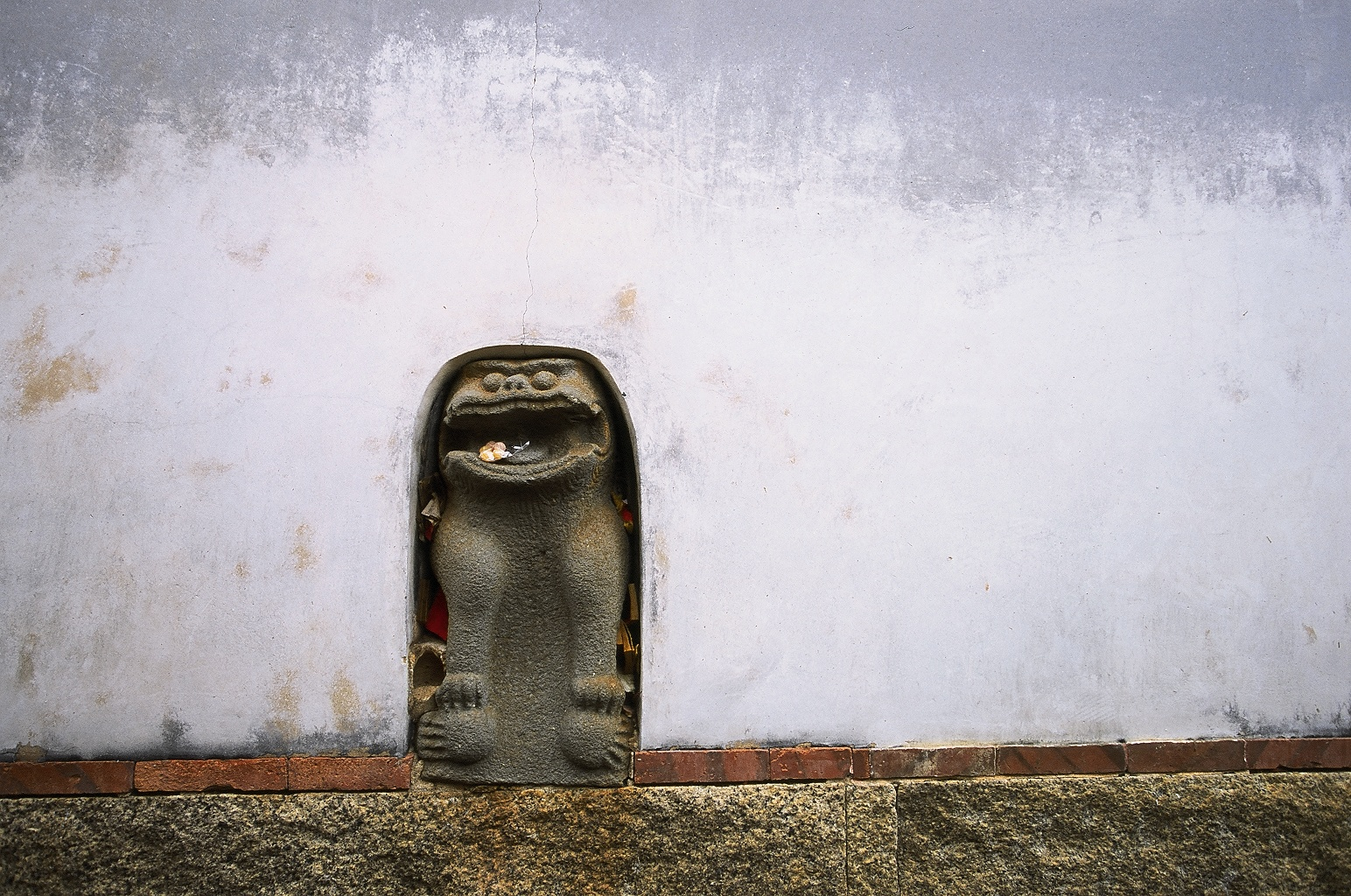
A shisa (wind-lion god) carving in Kinmen

The people of Kinmen see themselves as Kinmenese, Mínnánrén/Mǐnnánrén (people of Southern Fujian), or Chinese. They identify as citizens of the Republic of China but not so much as Taiwanese. Kinmen's strong Chinese identity was forged during the period of the ROC's military confrontation with the People's Republic of China (1949–1992) when Kinmen was under military administration. In the 1980s, as the militarization decreased and martial law was ended on Taiwan, the Taiwan independence movement and efforts in de-Sinicization grew in strength on Taiwan. To Kinmenese, however, these developments were viewed with concern and there was a feeling that "Taiwan didn't identify with Kinmen". Many worried that Taiwanese de jure independence from China would lead to the severing of ties with Kinmen. These concerns play a strong role in Kinmenese politics as well. Legally speaking, Kinmenese people are not Taiwanese either and have a unique identity from that of the Taiwanese. "Taiwanization" is sometimes perceived as a threat to the cultural identity of the Kinmenese people.

=== Language ===
Many of the county's inhabitants speak Hokkien; the Quanzhou accent is predominant. Most residents will say they speak Kinmenese, which is mutually intelligible with Taiwanese Hokkien. The residents of Wuchiu Township speak Pu-Xian Min, a different Chinese language.

=== Others ===
Kinmen is notable for a number of cultural products. Due to the extensive shelling by the People's Liberation Army in the 1950s, Kinmen is famous for its artillery shell knives. Local artisans would collect the vast amounts of exploded ordnance and make high-quality knives which are still sought after by chefs and connoisseurs. Kinmen is also home of the regionally famous Kinmen Kaoliang liquor, a spirit ranging between 38 and 63 percent alcohol, which is highly appreciated by the Taiwanese. Other local culinary specialties include Kinmen noodles, kòng-thn̂g and beef jerky (bakkwa).

Like the Ryukyus, Kinmen is known for shisa (wind-lion god) figures (風獅爺).

=== Cinema ===
During the martial law era, Kinmen was home to several cinemas that were popular gathering places for soldiers stationed on the island. Today, however, none of these historic movie theatres remain in operation.

Kinmen-born filmmaker Dong Cheng-Liang has devoted much of his work to portraying the island and its history. In 1994, he directed Every Odd Numbered Day (單打雙不打), which was the first movie directed by a local Kinmenese, also much of the cast was from Kinmen. More recently, Dong transformed his ancestral home in the village of Gugang into the Kinmen Cinema Museum (金門電影館), preserving the island's cinematic heritage.

== Military ==
Kinmen is home to the ROC Army's 101st Amphibious Reconnaissance Battalion also known as the ROC Army Frogman, whose main headquarter is garrisoned on Liaoluo Bay (料羅灣). As of 2024, United States soldiers visited the islands.

== Economy ==
Kinmen's economy is mainly based on tourism and services due to its proximity to mainland China.

=== Tourism ===
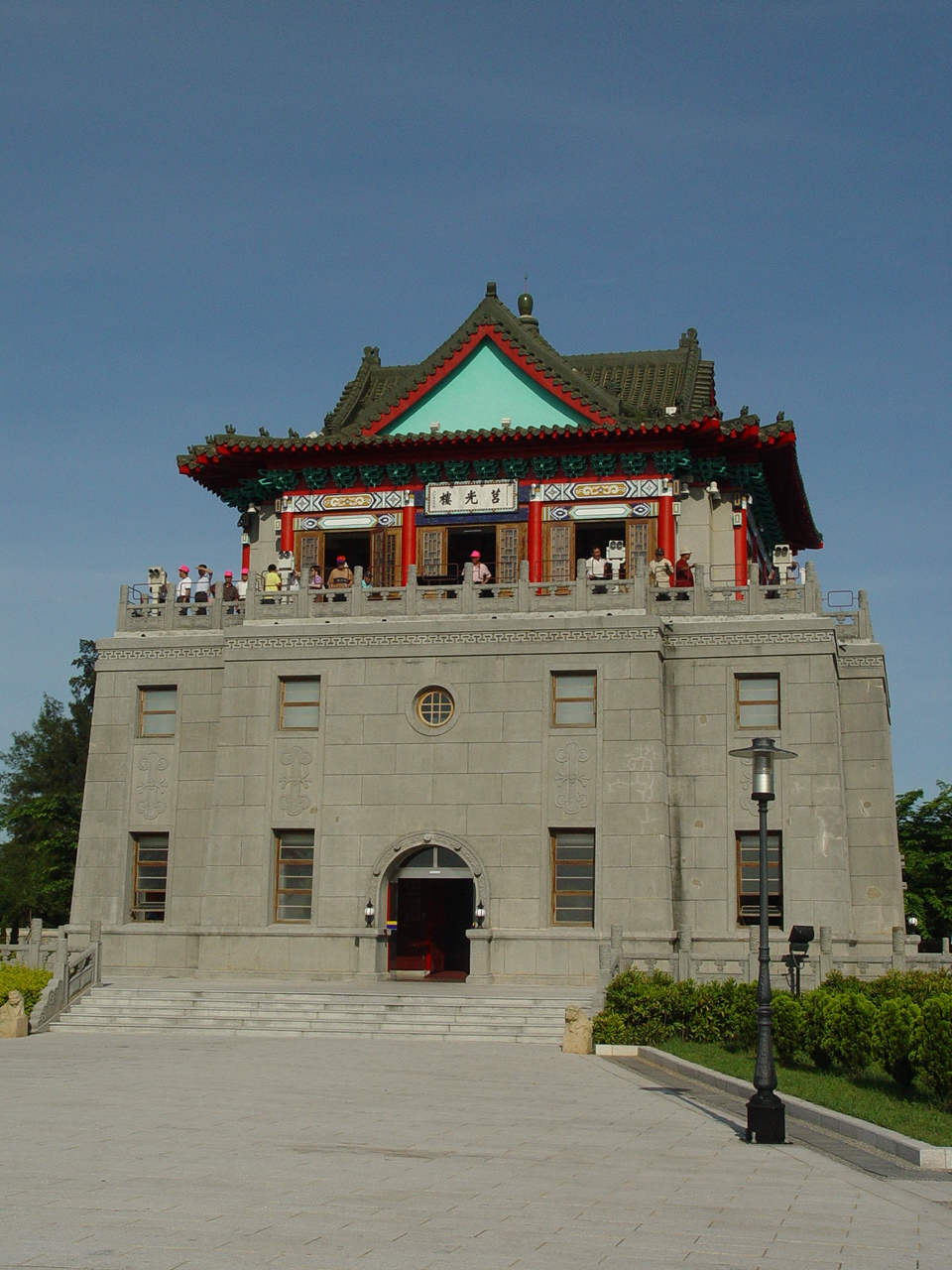
The Juguang Tower ("Brightness of Ju"), a famous landmark in Kinmen

Because of its military importance, development on the island was extremely limited. Only by 2003, Kinmen opened up itself to tourists from Fujian in Mainland China. It is now a popular weekend tourist destination for Taiwanese and is known for its quiet villages, old-style architecture and beaches. Chinese and Taiwanese tour groups also spend a short time touring the island whilst transiting between the ferry and the airport, as an intermediate stop between China and Taiwan. Large parts of Kinmen form the Kinmen National Park which highlights military fortifications and structures, historical dwellings and natural scenery.

The year 2014 recorded the highest number of passengers traveling by ferry between Kinmen and Fujian ports for as many as 1.5 million people. Since 1 January 2015, Chinese mainland tourists were no longer required to apply for Exit and Entry Permit in advance for visits to Kinmen, Penghu and Matsu Islands. Instead, they can apply for it upon arrival at a cost of NT$600.

By 2016, two infrastructure projects are expected to boost tourism and meetings, incentives, conferencing, exhibitions visitors to the islands. One includes a yet-to-be-named five-star resort spearheaded by Xiamen property developer, Wu Youhua, president of Xiamen Huatian Group, the first time a Chinese interest has been allowed to invest in the Taiwanese hotel sector.

According to local authorities in Kinmen, they had recorded over 745,000 tourists from mainland China in 2018, who had collectively spent over 360 million dollars during that year.

==== Tourist attractions ====
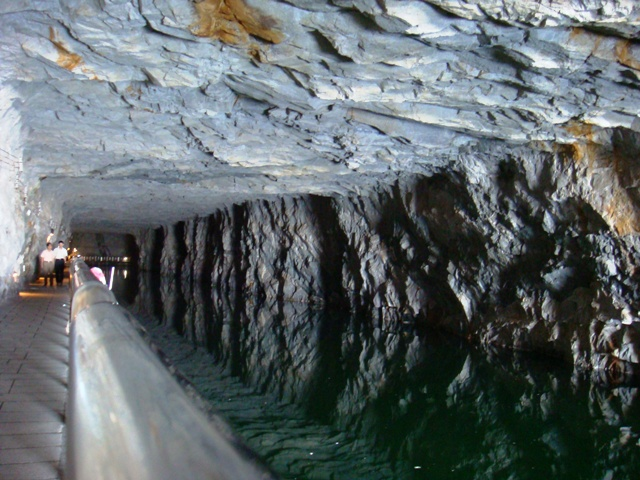
Zhaishan Tunnel

Tourist-related affairs in Kinmen are governed by Transportation and Tourism Bureau of Kinmen County Government. Major tourist attractions in Kinmen are:

===== Museums =====
August 23 Artillery Battle Museum, Guningtou Battle Museum, Hujingtou Battle Museum, Kinmen Ceramics Museum, Landmine Museum, Lieyu Township Culture Museum, Yu Da Wei Xian Sheng Memorial Museum.

===== Nature =====
Ci Lake, Gugang Lake, Houhu Seashore Park, Jiangong Islet, Jincheng Seaside Park, Kinmen National Park, Lingshui Lake, Tianpu Reservoir, Zhongzheng Park.

===== Historical buildings =====
Beishan Old Western-style House, Chenggong Coastal Defense Tunnel, Chen Shi-yin Western Style House, Deyue Gun Tower, Gulongtou Zhenwei Residence, Jindong Movie Theater, Jinshui Elementary School, Juguang Tower, Kinmen Folk Culture Village, Kinmen Military Headquarters of Qing Dynasty, Mashan Broadcasting and Observation Station, Mofan Street, Qingtian Hall, Qionglin Tunnel, Yannan Academy, Wang Chin-cheng's Western House, Wuqiu Lighthouse and Zhaishan Tunnel.

===== Religious buildings =====
Longfeng Temple, Maoshan Pagoda, Wentai Pagoda.

=== Industry ===
Kinmen is famous for the production of Kaoliang liquor, which takes up about 75% of Taiwan's market share, in which it is a strong economic backbone of the county. Traditional industries are also being kept and improved, ranging from agriculture, fishery and livestock. It also has a good fishery industry due to its nature of being surrounded by unpolluted sea.

Kinmen also produces its unique Kinmen knife, in which the raw material used to produce it is taken from the remnants of shells fired by the People's Liberation Army in 1958–1978. The knife was made as gift to the visiting Head of Taiwan Affairs Office Zhang Zhijun to Kinmen on 23–24 May 2015 to symbolize mutual peace between the two sides of the Taiwan Strait and to bury the hatchet left from Chinese Civil War.

=== Imported goods ===
Kinmen often import more goods from Mainland China than Taiwan Island because of lower costs due to the proximity of the county to the mainland. During the campaign for the 2014 county magistrate, all of the magistrate candidates spent their money on campaign materials produced in mainland provinces, such as Guangdong, Zhejiang and Fujian instead of from Taiwan Island.

== Politics ==
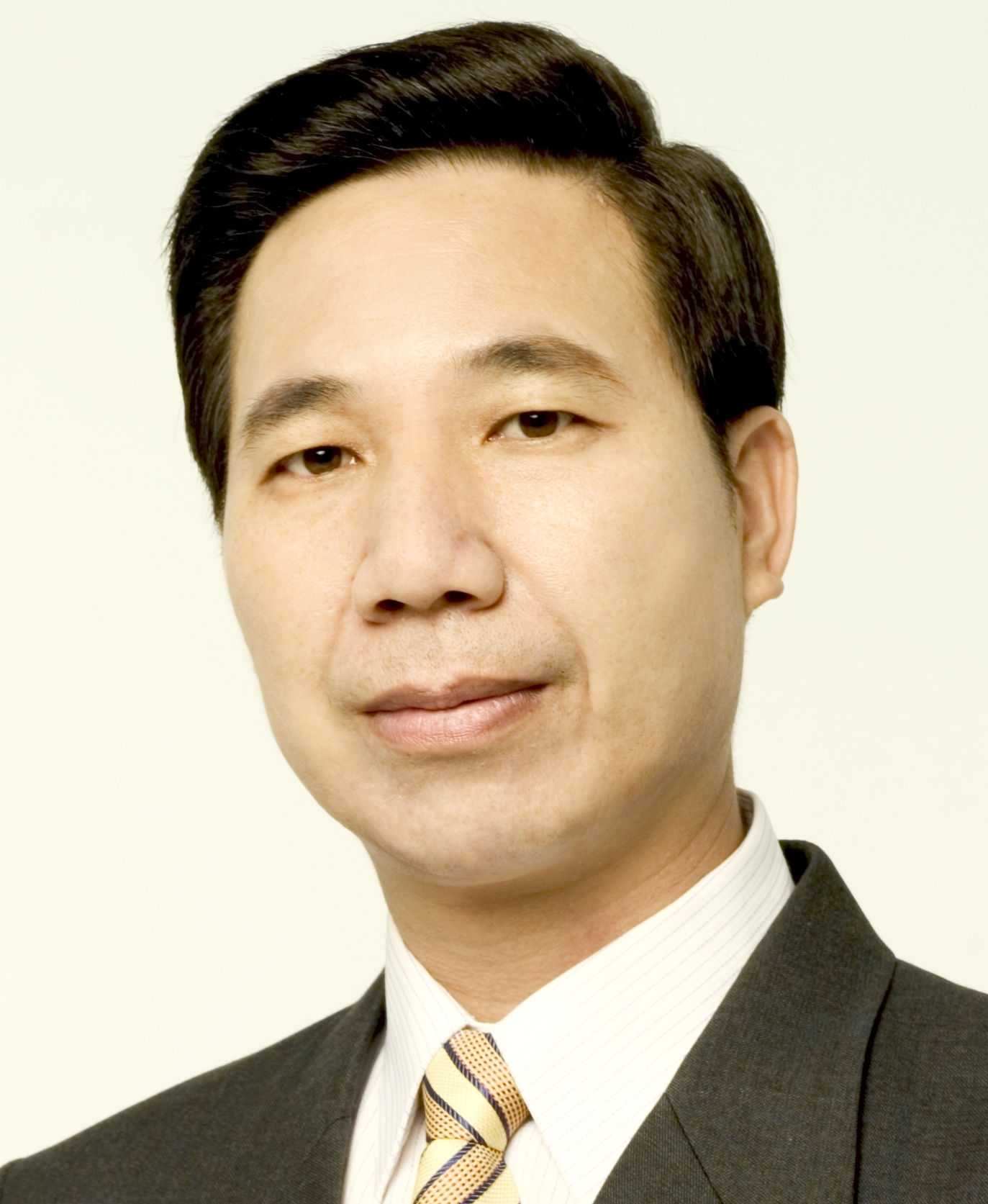
Chen Fu-hai, the incumbent Magistrate of Kinmen County

The island consistently votes for the Kuomintang (KMT). Until the early 1990s, proponents of Taiwan independence argued that they would consider handing Kinmen over to the PRC in any negotiated settlement. Residents of the island have broadly opposed such measures.

The Democratic Progressive Party has a minor presence on the island and typically does not present candidates to stand in local elections, although it does hold a single seat in Kinmen County Council from both of the 2009 and 2014 local elections. However, the party occasionally lends support to liberal or center-left candidates.

On 29 November 2014, independent candidate Chen Fu-hai won the county magistrate election and took office as the Magistrate of Kinmen County on 25 December 2014, the first independent candidate to win the office. He replaced Magistrate Lee Wo-shih of the Kuomintang. The 2014 Kinmen County magistrate election consisted of 10 candidates, the highest number of nominated candidates in the electoral history of Taiwan.

Kinmen County Constituency is represented by a single seat in the Legislative Yuan. It is currently represented by Chen Yu-chen (traditional Chinese: 陳玉珍; simplified Chinese: 陈玉珍; pinyin: Chén Yùzhēn) of the Kuomintang. The current majority seats of Kinmen County Council is from independent, but headed by speaker Hung Yun-tien (Chinese: 洪允典; pinyin: Hóng Yǔndiǎn) of the Kuomintang. The incumbent Magistrate of Kinmen County is independent Chen Fu-hai.

=== Townships ===
Subdivision of Kinmen County into townships

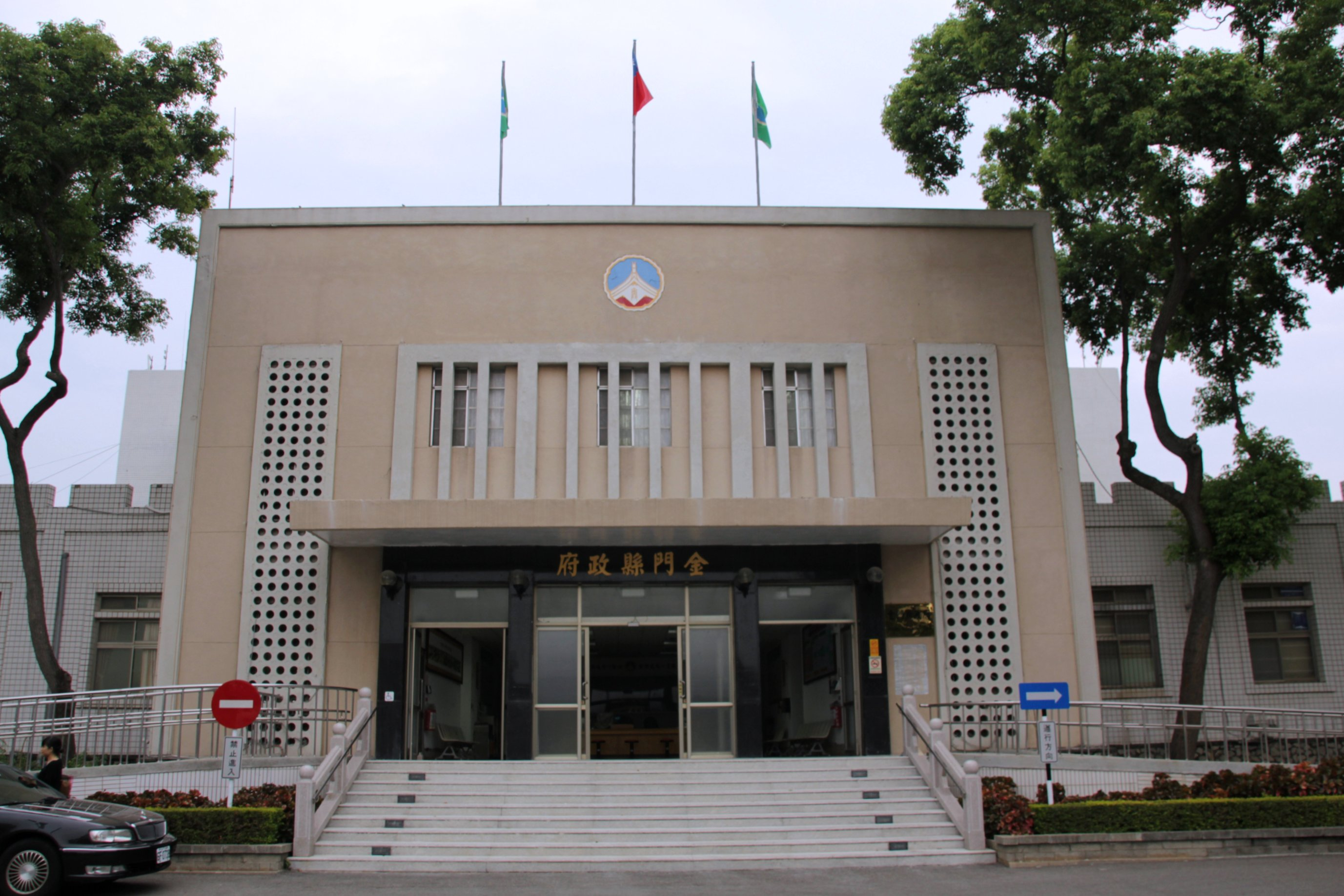
Kinmen County Government

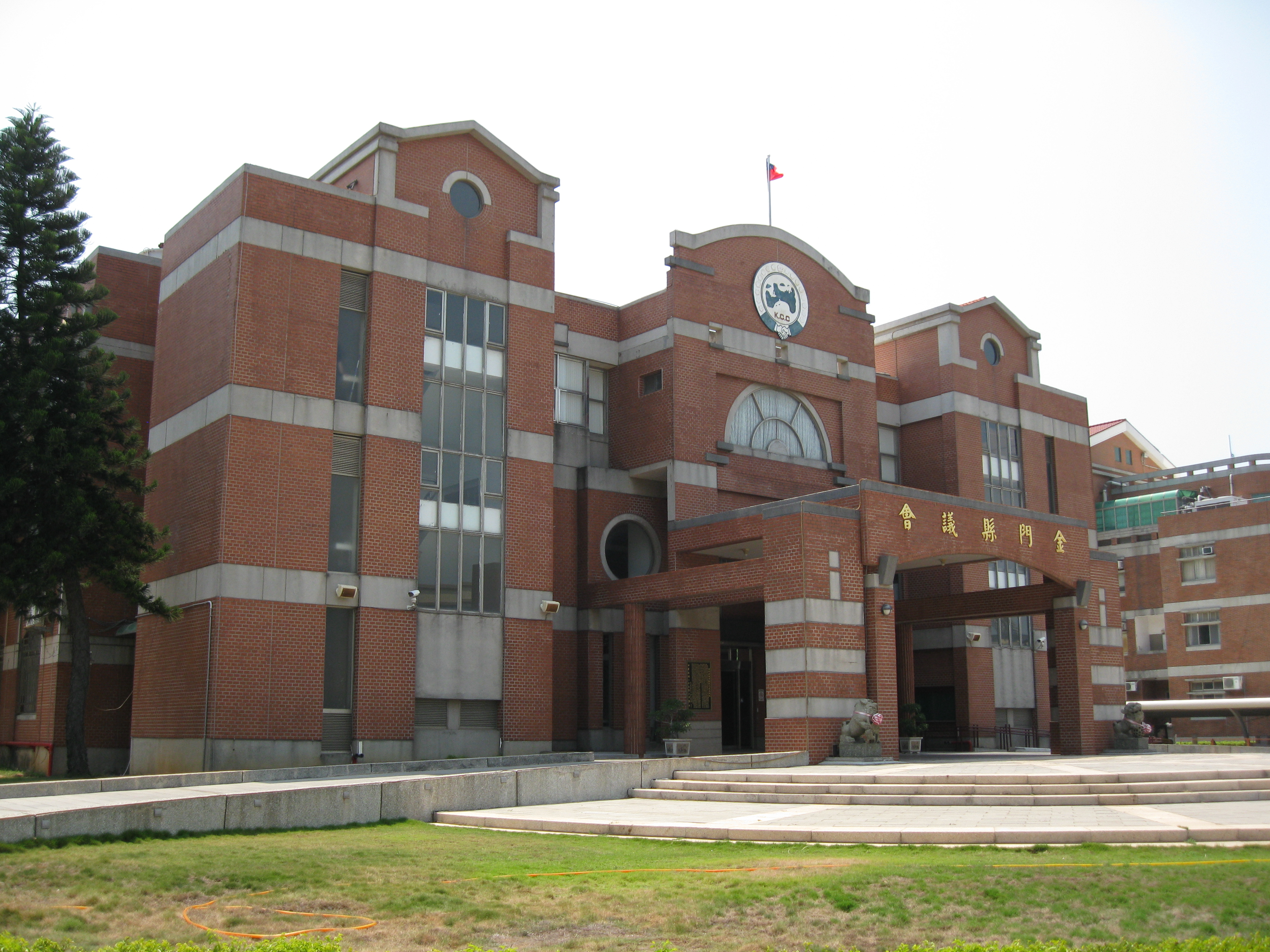
Kinmen County Council

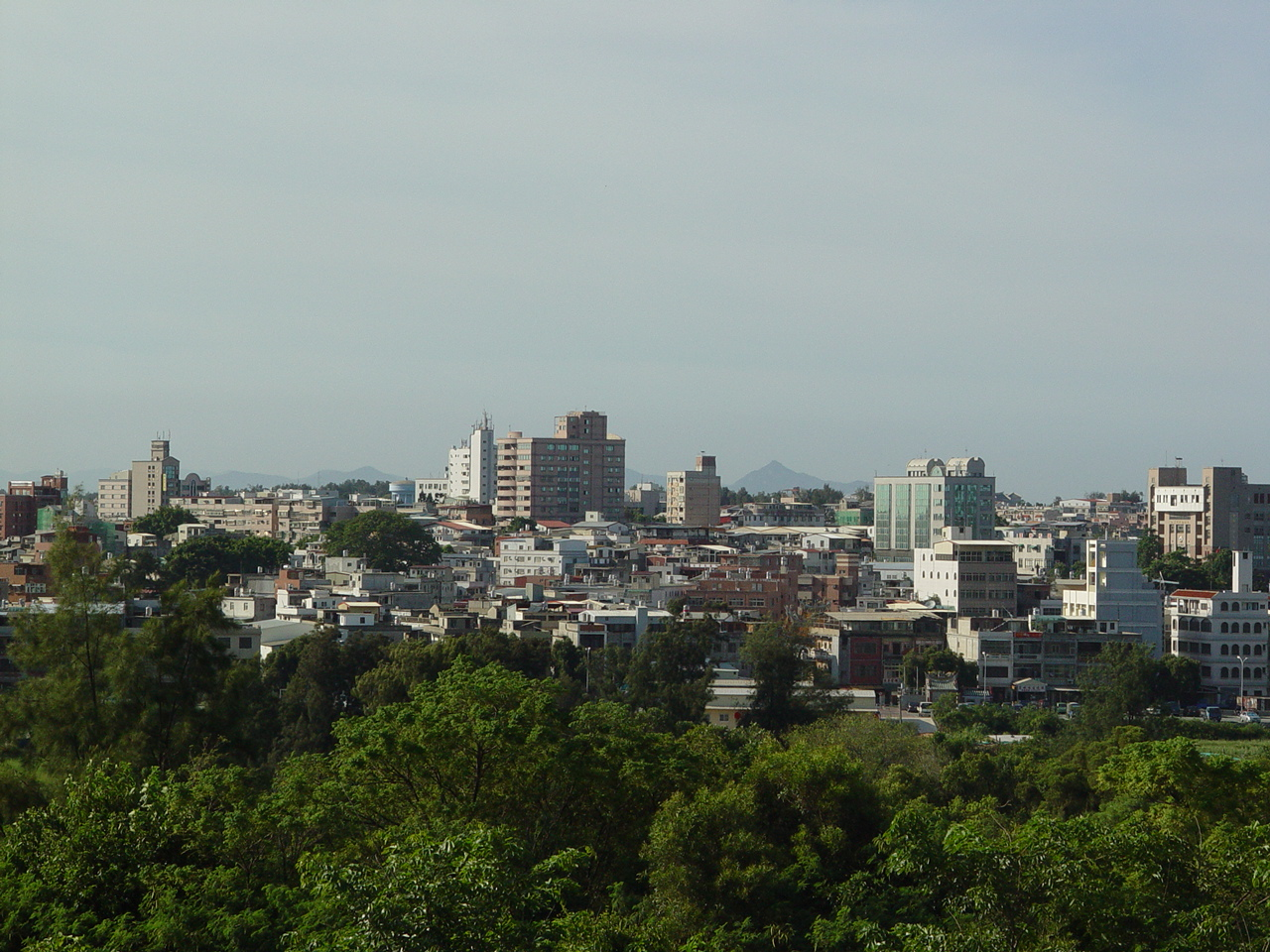
Jincheng Township, the county seat of Kinmen

Kinmen County is divided into three urban townships and three rural townships. Jincheng Township is the county seat which houses Kinmen County Government and Kinmen County Council. The township also houses the headquarter office of Kinmen-Matsu Joint Services Center. Kinmen County has the fewest rural townships among other counties in Taiwan.

Name	Chinese	Hanyu Pinyin	Wade–Giles	Hokkien Pe̍h-ōe-jī	English meaning
Urban townships
Jincheng Township	金城鎮	Jīnchéng Zhèn	Chin¹-ch'eng² Chen⁴	Kim-siâⁿ-tìn	'Golden City'
Jinhu Township	金湖鎮	Jīnhú Zhèn	Chin¹-hu² Chen⁴	Kim-ô͘-tìn	'Golden Lake'
Jinsha Township	金沙鎮	Jīnshā Zhèn	Chin¹-sha¹ Chen⁴	Kim-soa-tìn	'Gold Dust'
Rural townships
Jinning Township	金寧鄉	Jīnníng Xiāng	Chin¹-ning² Hsiang¹	Kim-lêng-hiong	'Golden Tranquility'
Lieyu Township	烈嶼鄉	Lièyǔ Xiāng	Lie⁴-yü³ Hsiang¹	Lia̍t-sū-hiong	'Split-off Islet'
Wuqiu Township	烏坵鄉	Wūqiū Xiāng	Wu¹-ch'iu¹ Hsiang¹	O͘-khiu-hiong	'Black Mound'

All those townships on Greater Kinmen Island start their names with Jin (i.e., Kin, lit. "gold"). Lieyu Township encompasses the entire Lesser Kinmen Island, and is the closest to Xiamen. Wuqiu Township comprises Greater Qiu Islet (大坵) and Lesser Qiu Islet (小坵).

Jincheng and Jinsha are the largest of the six townships. Altogether, there are 37 villages in Kinmen County.

=== Cross-Strait relations ===
In the controversy regarding the political status of Taiwan, the People's Republic of China (PRC) has continuously claimed the territory of Kinmen County as part of its own Fujian Province, claiming the Kinmen Islands as a county of Quanzhou prefecture-level city. The PRC claims the Wuqiu (Ockseu) Islands as part of Xiuyu District in Putian prefecture-level city. Taiwan (Republic of China) claims the Dadeng (Tateng) Islands in Dadeng Subdistrict, Xiang'an District, Xiamen, Fujian as part of Kinmen County.

== Education ==
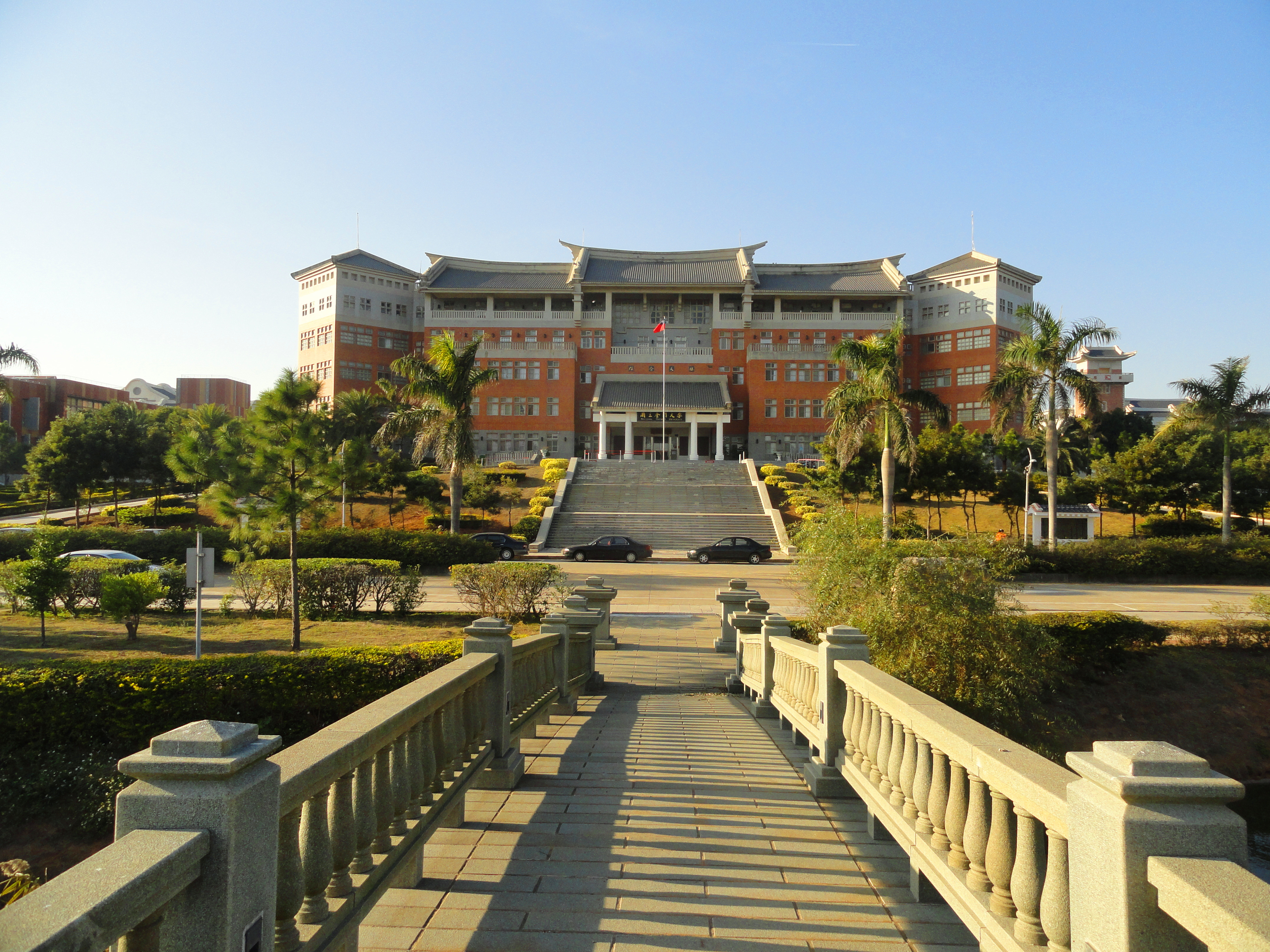
National Quemoy University

In August 2010, National Quemoy University was established from the predecessor National Kinmen Institute of Technology and Kinmen Division of National Kaohsiung University of Applied Sciences established in 1997. It is located in Jinning Township. The islands also have a satellite campuses of Ming Chuan University and National University of Kaohsiung. Secondary educational institutions include National Kinmen Senior High School and National Kinmen Agricultural and Industrial Vocational Senior High School. In total, there are 24 junior high schools, elementary schools and kindergartens.

The Kinmen County Government have invested millions in education in Kinmen, with an average of NT$20,000 per student. Schools in the county also accept the growing number of Taiwanese students whose parents are doing business in Fujian, China. The county government has been striving to encourage universities in Taiwan and China to set up branches in the county, as well as to attract Chinese students to study in Kinmen.

== Infrastructure ==
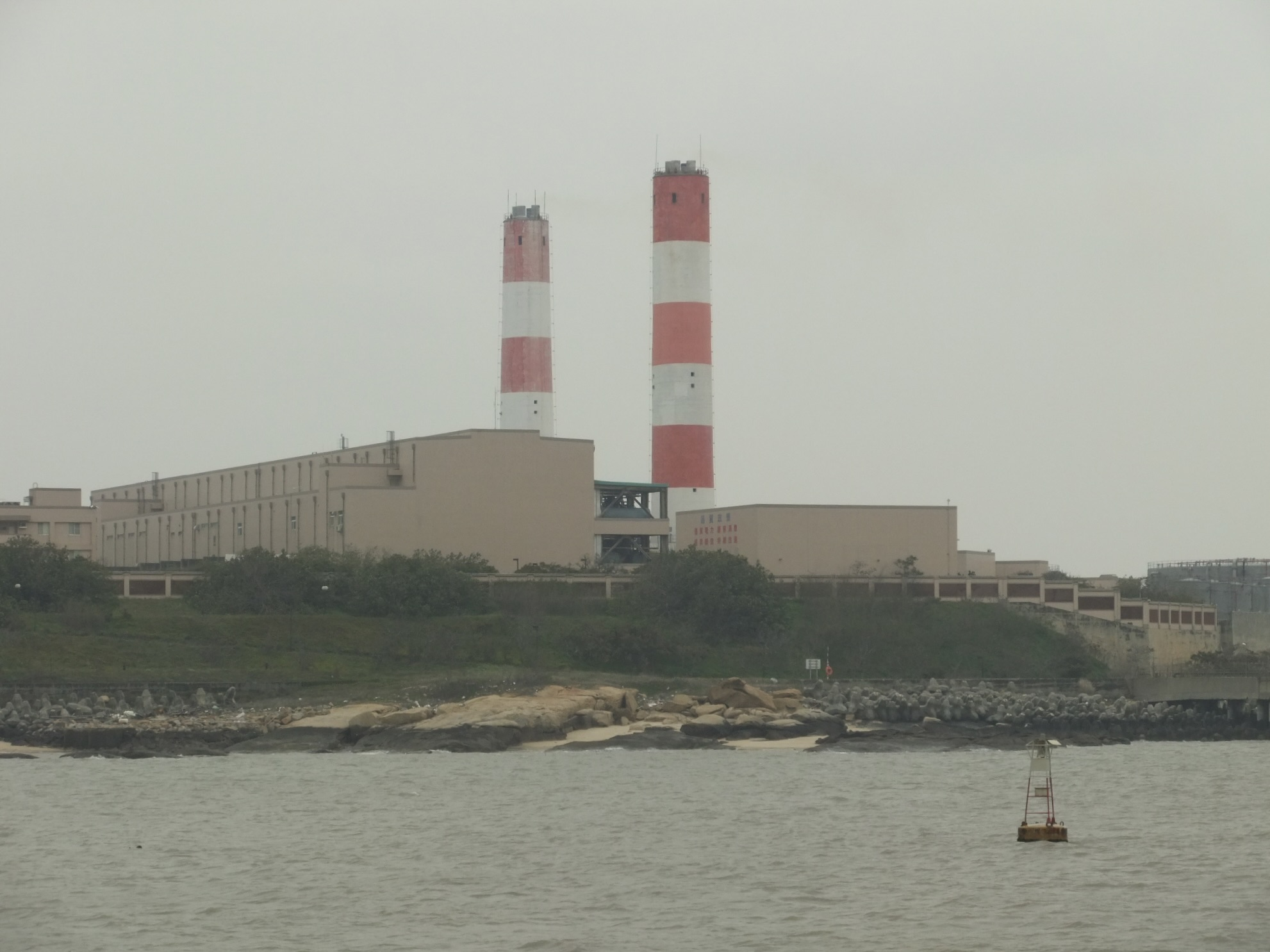
Tashan Power Plant

=== Electricity ===
The Kinmen Power Company was founded in 1967 and gradually built five power plants in the county and is in charge of providing power resources to all residents in Kinmen. It used to rely on light diesel oil which created high cost burden to its management. Since 1992, the ROC central government approved the power company to authorize Taiwan Power Company (Taipower) for five-year management. All of the power development projects were invested by Taipower and helped the region economic development. In July 1997, Kinmen Power Company was officially incorporated to Taipower. In 1999, the diesel-fired Tashan Power Plant was built to supply electricity to Kinmen grid. The other smaller power plants were subsequently discontinued to reduce cost. The county is also powered by its Jinmen Wind wind farm with a capacity of 4 MW and photovoltaic system with a capacity of 9 MW.

=== Submarine telecommunication cable ===
In August 2012, Kinmen and Xiamen established the first submarine telecommunication cable between the two sides. On Taiwan side, the infrastructure was constructed by Chunghwa Telecom, while on mainland China's side was done by China Telecom, China Unicom and China Mobile. The project began in 1996 and took 16 years to build.

The telecommunication system consists of two cables, one is an 11 km (6.8 mi) long cable that runs from Kinmen's Lake Tzu and Xiamen's Mount Guanyin, and the other is a 9.7 km (6.0 mi) long cable that runs from Guningtou on Greater Kinmen Island (ROC) to Dadeng Island (PRC). The system is a non-repeater system with a bilateral transmission capacity of 90 Gbit/s, which might be expanded in the future if demand arises.

=== Water supply ===
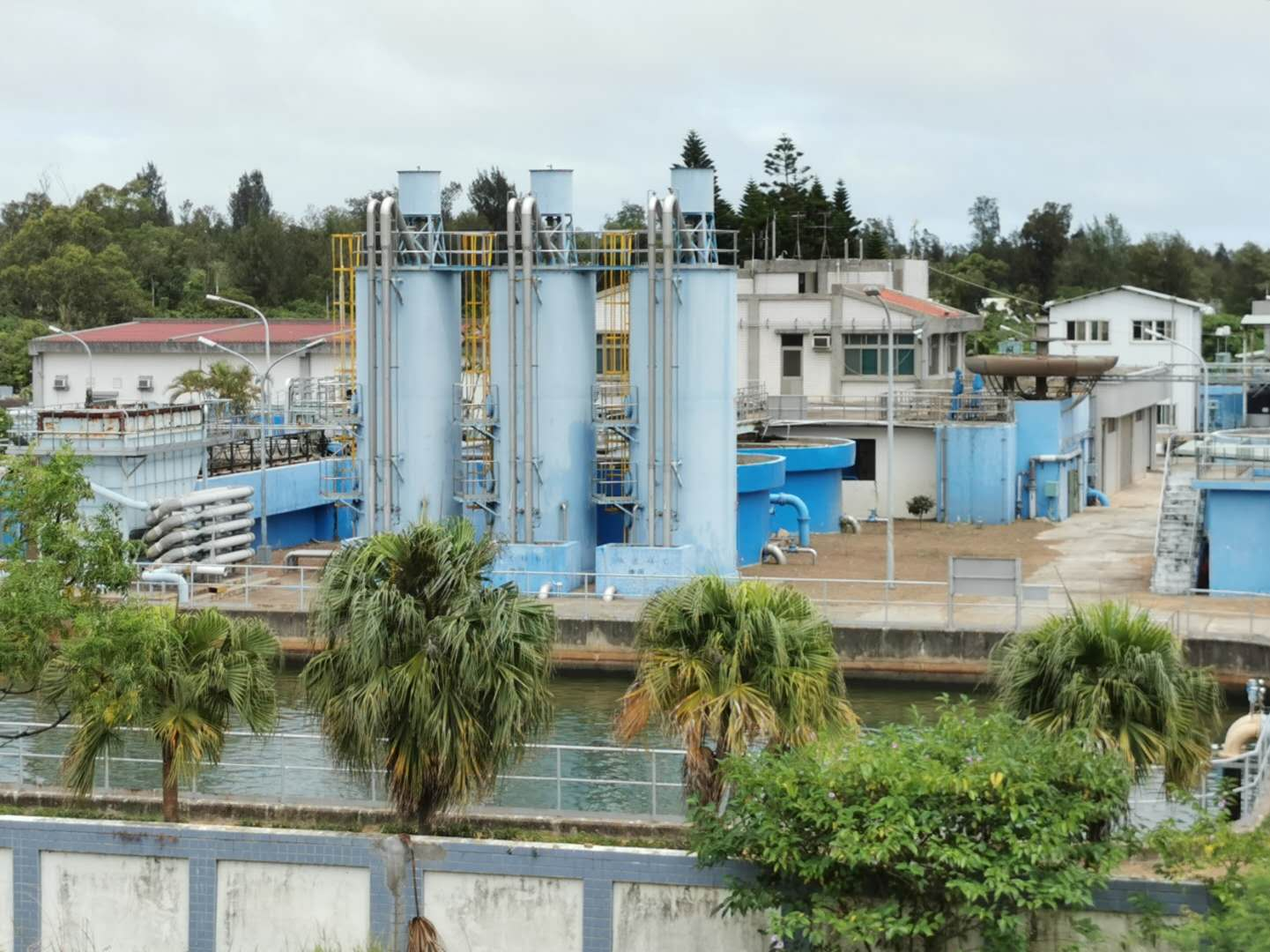
Water treatment plant in Kinmen

The current daily water demand for Kinmen is 50,000 tonnes, which are used for households, industries and agriculture sectors. One tonne of water produced for Kinmen costs about NT$50–60 and may surge to NT$70 during summer. In extreme drought condition, water shipment from Taiwan Island may cost as much as NT$200 per tonne. Because Kinmen residents pay only NT$10 for each tonne water they use, the cost of water supply has become a heavy burden for the county government.

For decades, Kinmen has been facing difficulties in water supply to its residents due to its shallow lakes, lack of rainfall and geographical constraints which makes building reservoirs and dams unfeasible. Therefore, Kinmen often overuses its groundwater, causing rising tidal flood and soil salinity.

In early September 2013, the People's Republic of China government agreed to supply Kinmen with water from Jinjiang City in Fujian due to the ongoing water shortage problem in Kinmen. Kinmen draws more than 8,000 tonnes of groundwater every day and water from its reservoir is barely enough to support the residents during the dry season. It was judged that a shortage would affect the local economy badly if no mitigation plan was enacted by 2016. The water supply agreement was officially signed on 20 July 2015 in Kinmen between Kinmen County Waterworks Director Weng Wen-kuei (翁文貴) and Fujian Water Supply Co chairman Zhu Jinliang (朱金良) witnessed by Kinmen County Magistrate Chen Fu-hai and Fujian Province Governor Su Shulin.

The Jinjiang–Kinmen Pipeline was officially opened on 5 August 2018 when it first started supplying water, and was celebrated by separate ceremonies held in both Kinmen County and Jinjiang City in mainland China.

== Transport ==
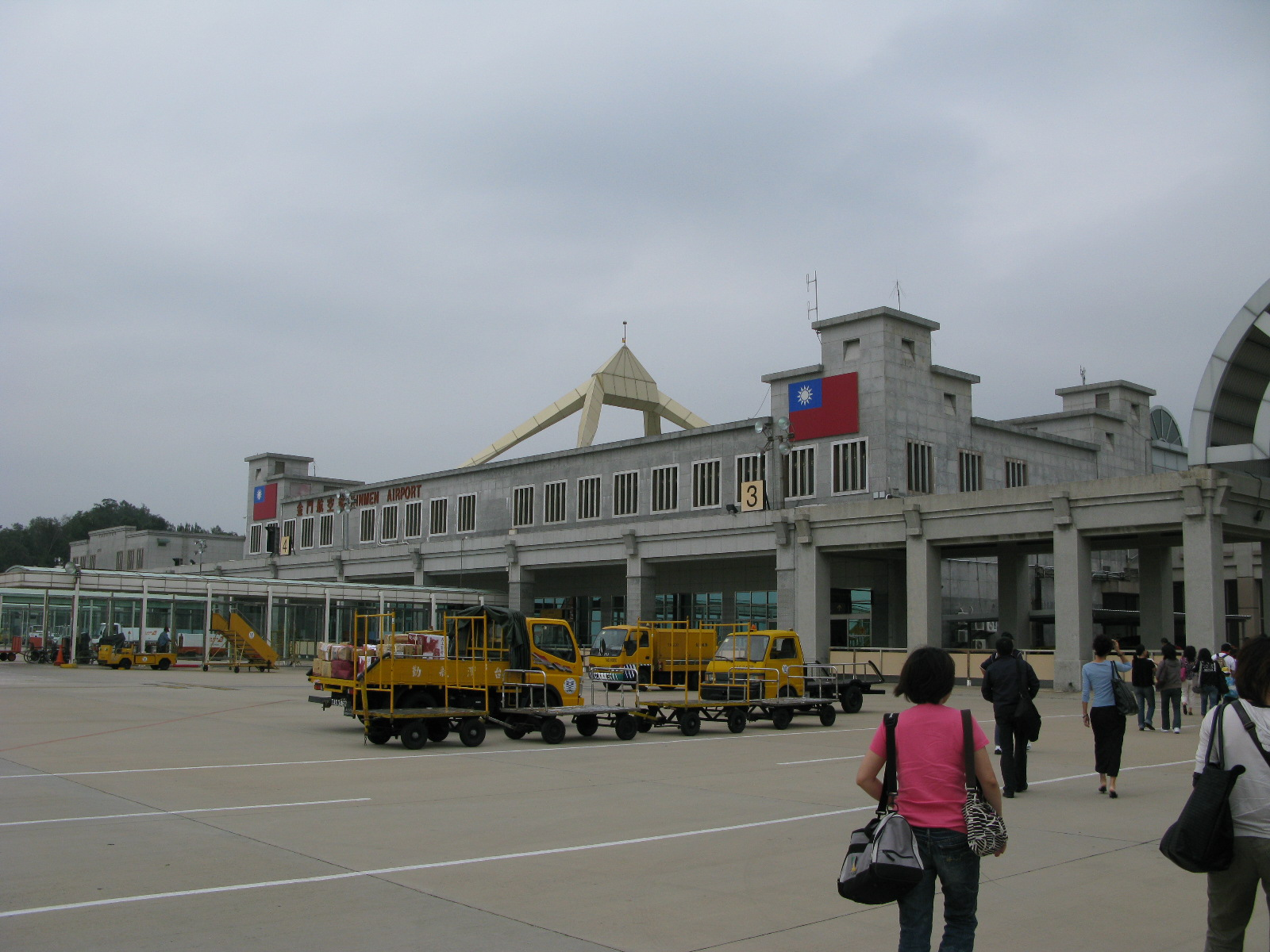
Kinmen Airport

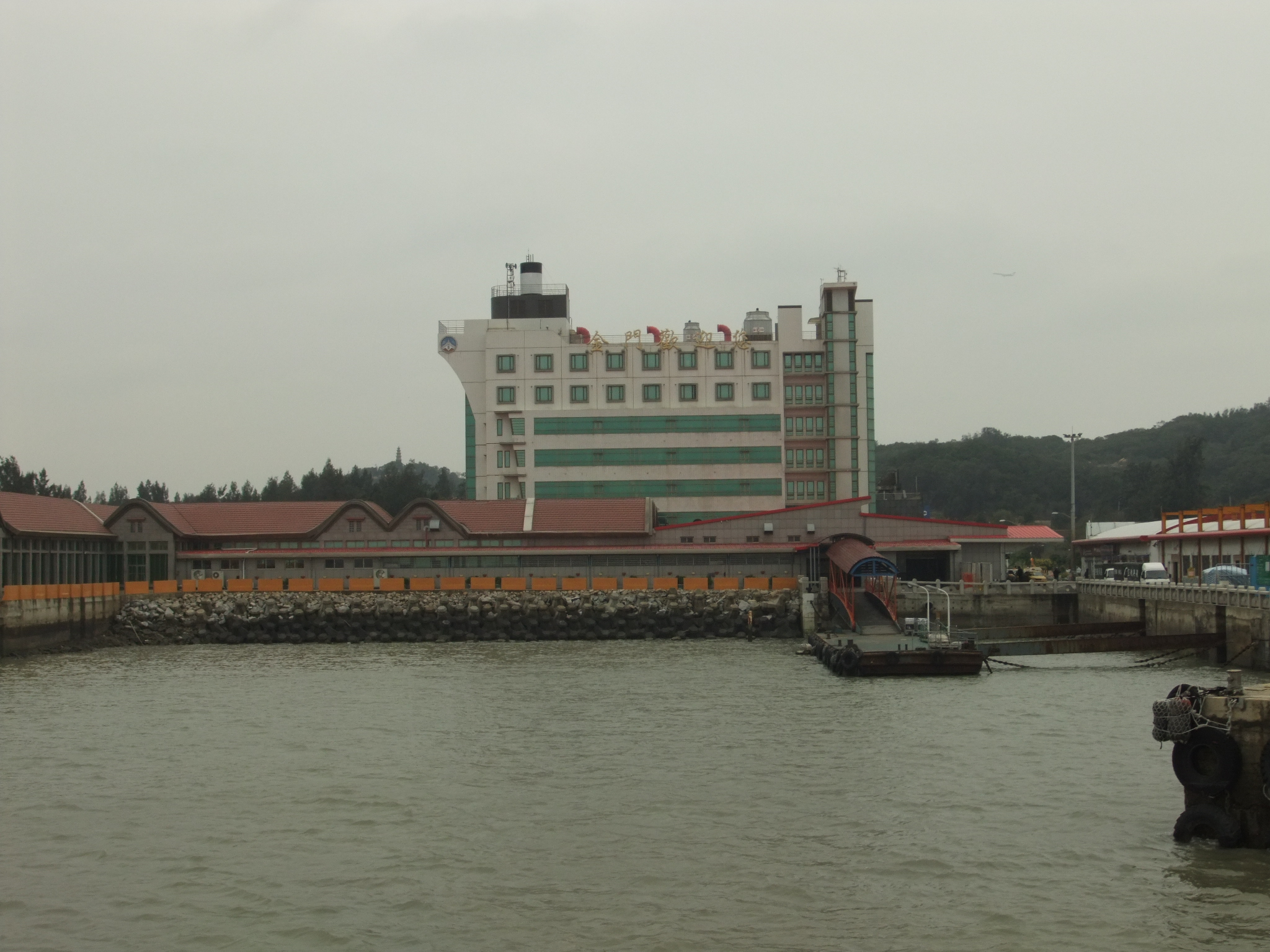
Shuitou Pier

=== Air ===
Kinmen is served by Kinmen Airport, a domestic airport located at Jinhu Township, connecting Kinmen with Penghu Airport, Penghu and Taipei Songshan, Kaohsiung, Taichung, Chiayi and Tainan Airport on Taiwan.

=== Sea ===
People coming from China can also travel to Kinmen via ferry from Xiamen's Wutong Ferry Terminal or Quanzhou, arriving at Shuitou Pier in Jincheng Township. Foreign passport holders are permitted to use either service.

A new commercial port has been built on newly reclaimed land adjacent to the Shuitou Pier. The new port will handle the majority of sea freight to and from Kinmen. Previously, most of this traffic was handled by a smaller port in Jinhu Township, on the southeast corner of the island. In the past, due to constant artillery shelling from China, an underground port at the Zhaishan Tunnel was used to supply the island in times of conflict. It has since been decommissioned and converted into a tourist attraction.

=== Road ===
A 5.4 km (3.4 mi) bridge, the Kinmen Bridge, connecting Kinmen Island (Greater Kinmen) and Lieyu was completed in October 2022, estimated to cost NT$7.5 billion (US$250 million). It is expected to increase local tourism.

In October 2019, China announced a plan to build a bridge linking Xiamen to Kinmen. Taiwan's Mainland Affairs Council (MAC) said that the plans were made unilaterally by China as part of its schemes to absorb Taiwan and divide Taiwanese society, and that they see no need for bridges linking either Matsu or Kinmen to China.

== Gallery ==
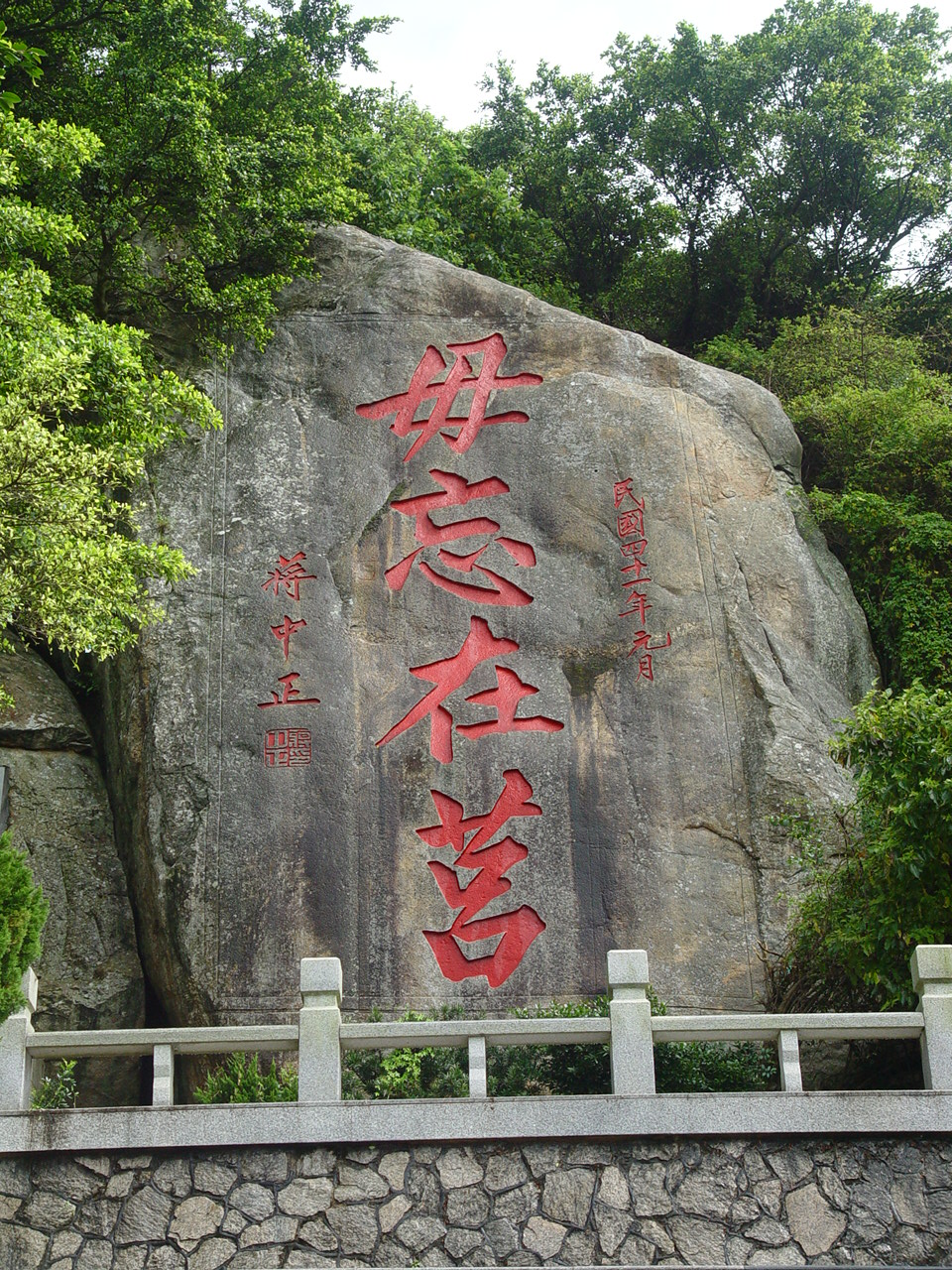
Calligraphy by former President Chiang Kai-shek etched on Wu-Wang-Zai-Ju Inscribed Rock

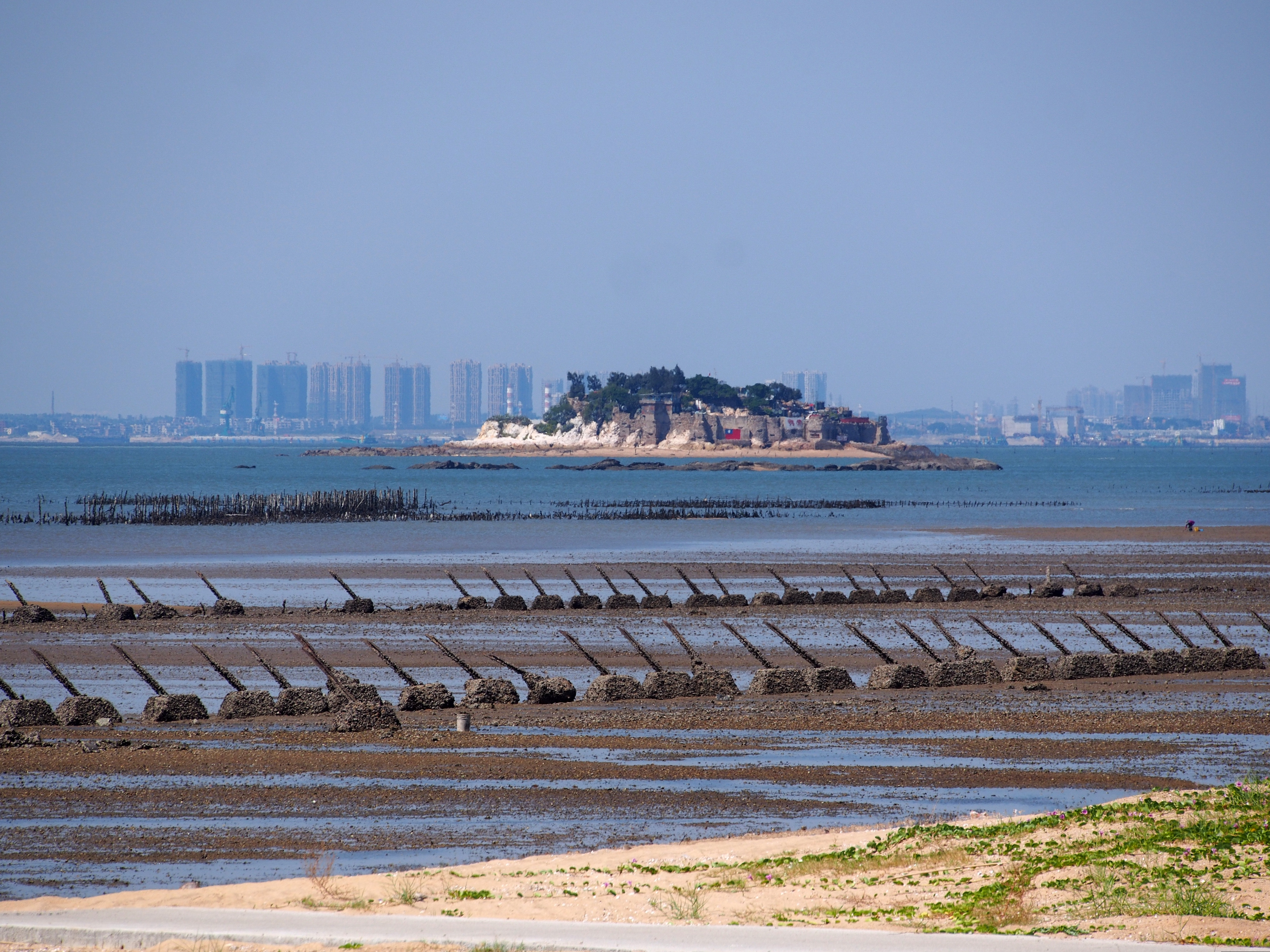
Anti-landing spikes on Lesser Kinmen (Lieyu) near Shi Islet with Xiamen (Amoy) in the background

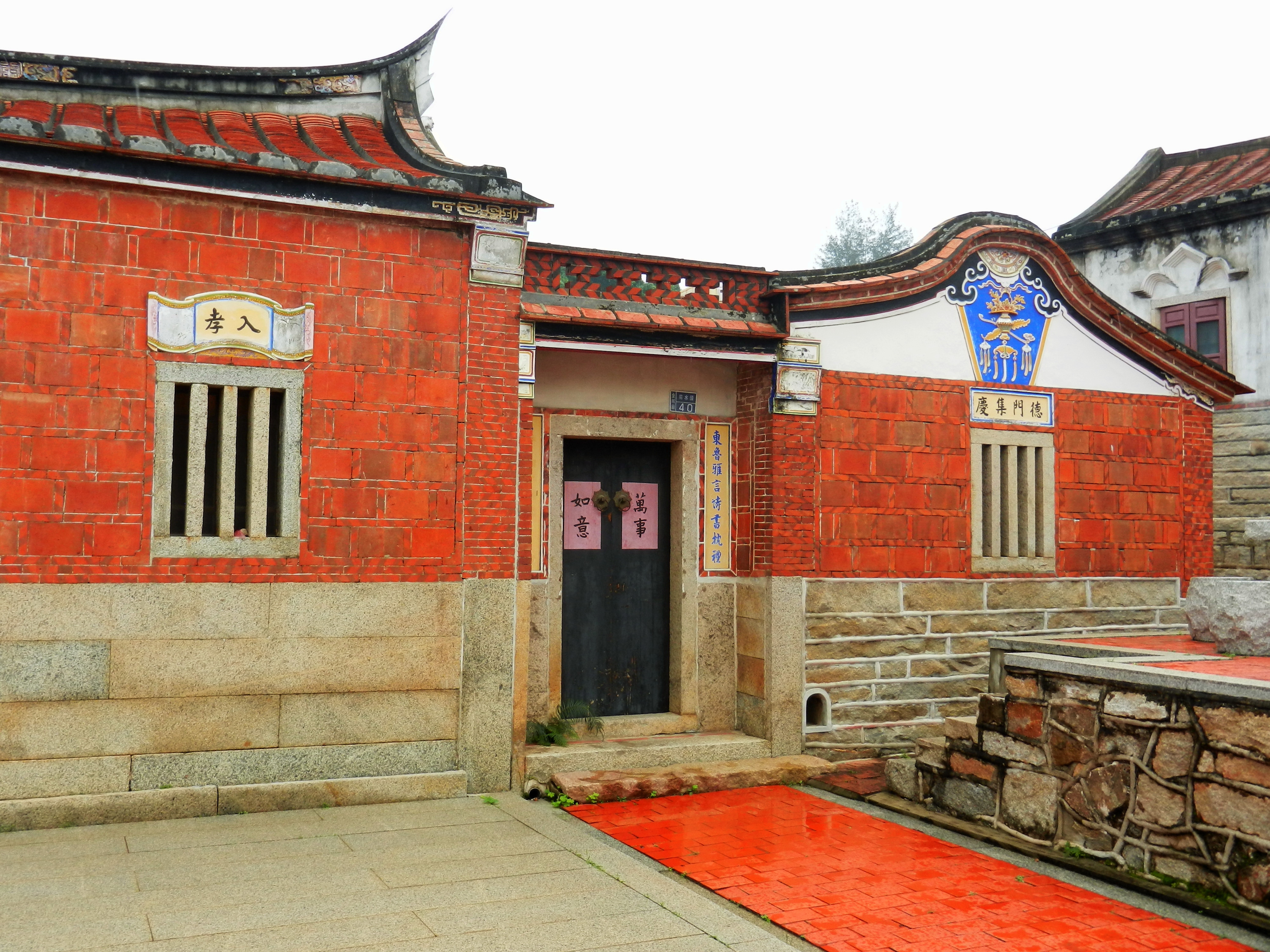
Shuitou historical residence (水頭古厝)

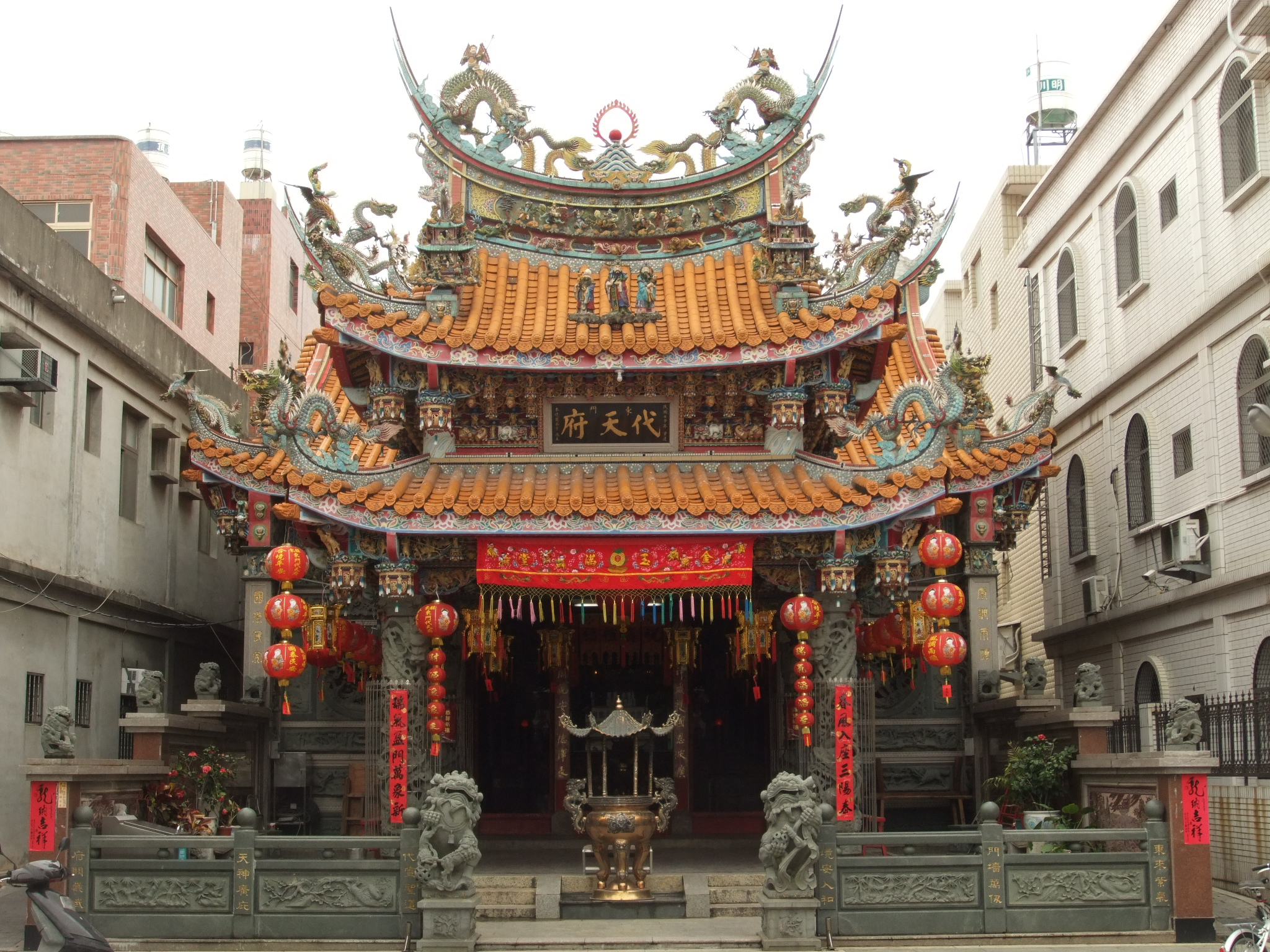
Daitianfu (代天府) in Jincheng

== See also ==
- Administrative divisions of Taiwan
- Kinmen Agreement
- The Kinmen Bombs, the film of 1986 set in the Kinmen Shelling War
- Island in Between, the film of 2023

== External links and further reading ==
- Official website
- Geographic data related to Kinmen at OpenStreetMap
- Complete list of the villages in each township
- Kinmen Island: China without the Communism?
- On A Rural Taiwanese Island, Modern China Beckons, NPR (11 September 2016)
- Pictures : Taiwan on China's shores. Reuters.
- Satellite image of Greater Kinmen and Lesser Kinmen by Google Maps
- Michael Szonyi, Cold War Island: Quemoy on the Front Line, Cambridge University Press (11 August 2008), hardcover, 328 pages, ISBN 0521898137 ISBN 978-0521898133; trade paperback, 328 pages, ISBN 0521726409, ISBN 978-0521726405
