= Kinmen knife =

Knives made from artillery shells

knife set with honing steel made from artillery shell remains

Close up of knife set with Kinmen engraving

The Kinmen knife (Chinese: 金門菜刀; pinyin: Jīnmén Càidāo) is a Chinese-style chef knife exclusively made in Kinmen County in Republic of China. The knives were once made from the remains of artillery shells fired by the United States and Allied forces in World War II, when the island was occupied by the Empire of Japan, and by mainland China between 1958 and 1978.

During the Second Taiwan Strait Crisis, the People's Liberation Army (PLA) of the People's Republic of China fired around 1,000,000 shells at the Kinmen islands in its conflict against the Republic of China which controls the islands. The shells have become a resource of steel for the local economy. Since the Second Taiwan Strait Crisis, Kinmen has become famous for its production of knives made from PRC artillery shells. Many of the shells in the later stages of the war were propaganda shells, with the high-explosive removed and replaced with stuffed leaflets, thus impacting on the island intact, rather than exploding into many tiny fragments. A blacksmith in Kinmen generally produces 10 to 60 knives from one artillery shell and tourists often purchase Kinmen knives as souvenirs together with other local specialties.

During his visit to Kinmen on 23–24 May 2015, Zhang Zhijun, head of the Taiwan Affairs Office of Mainland China, received a Kinmen knife as a gift made from PLA shells.

A blacksmith at Maestro Wu demonstrates the making of an artillery shell knife.

== External sources ==
- Kinmen history
- The knives are out in Kinmen Taipei Times
- Kinmen knife (Chinese)
- NHK好奇金門菜刀史：打台灣的砲彈作成刀 大陸人特愛 - NOWnews
