= Wutong Ferry Terminal =

Wutong Ferry Terminal Wutong Port
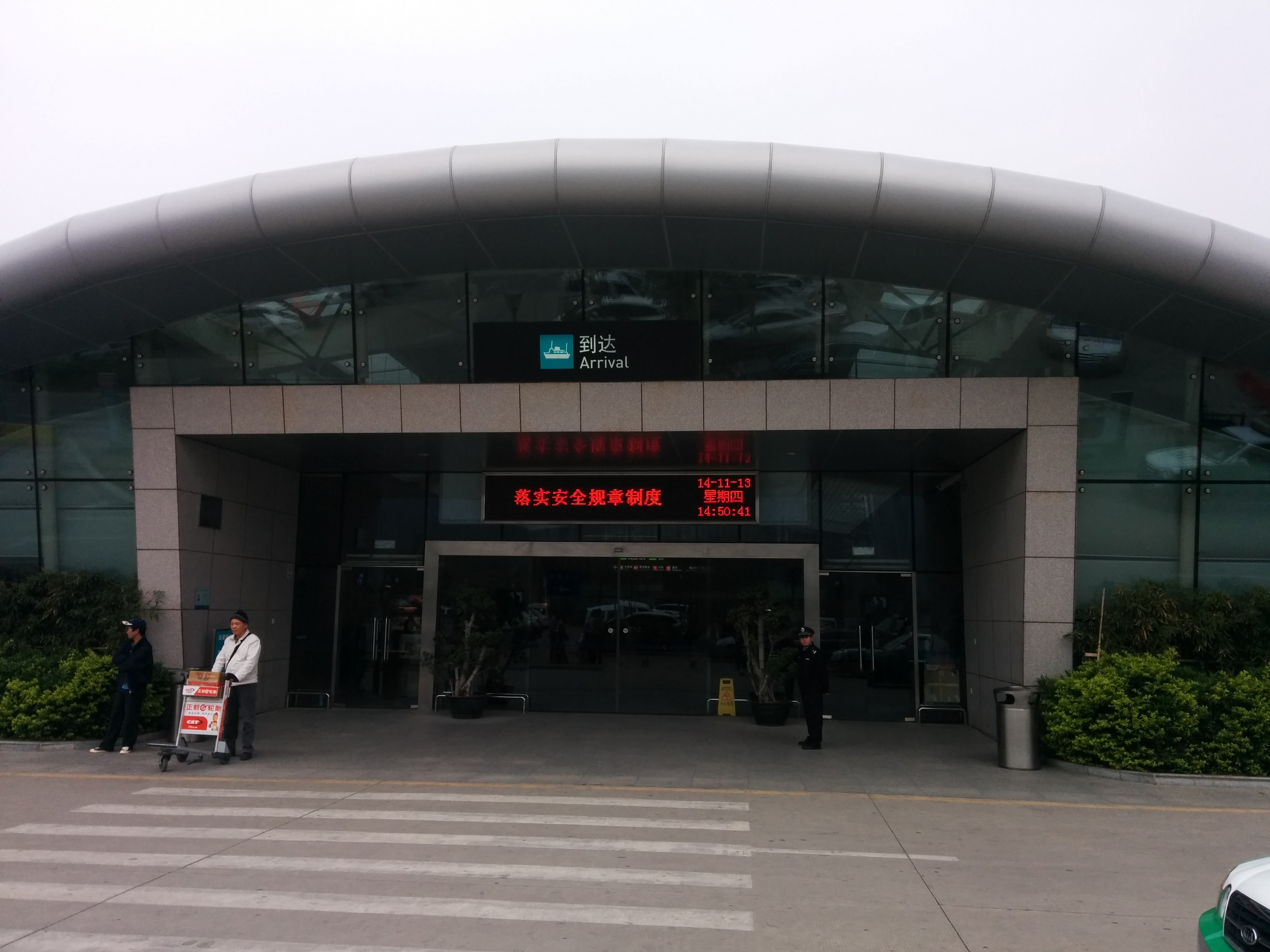
- Interactive map of Wutong Ferry Terminal; Wutong Port

Location
- Country: People's Republic of China
- Location: Xiamen, Fujian, China
- Coordinates: 24.5333°N 118.1884°E

Details
- No. of berths: 4
- No. of piers: 1

Wutong Ferry Terminal or Wutong Port (simplified Chinese: 五通码头; traditional Chinese: 五通碼頭; pinyin: Wǔtōng Mǎtóu; Pe̍h-ōe-jī: Ngóu-thong Bé-thâu) is located on the North East coastline of Xiamen Island in the city of Xiamen, Fujian, China. It is a modern ferry terminal allowing hourly ferry services to the Taiwanese controlled Kinmen Island. It features immigration facilities and check-in services for Kinmen Airport allowing for seamless transfers between many cities in Taiwan and mainland China.

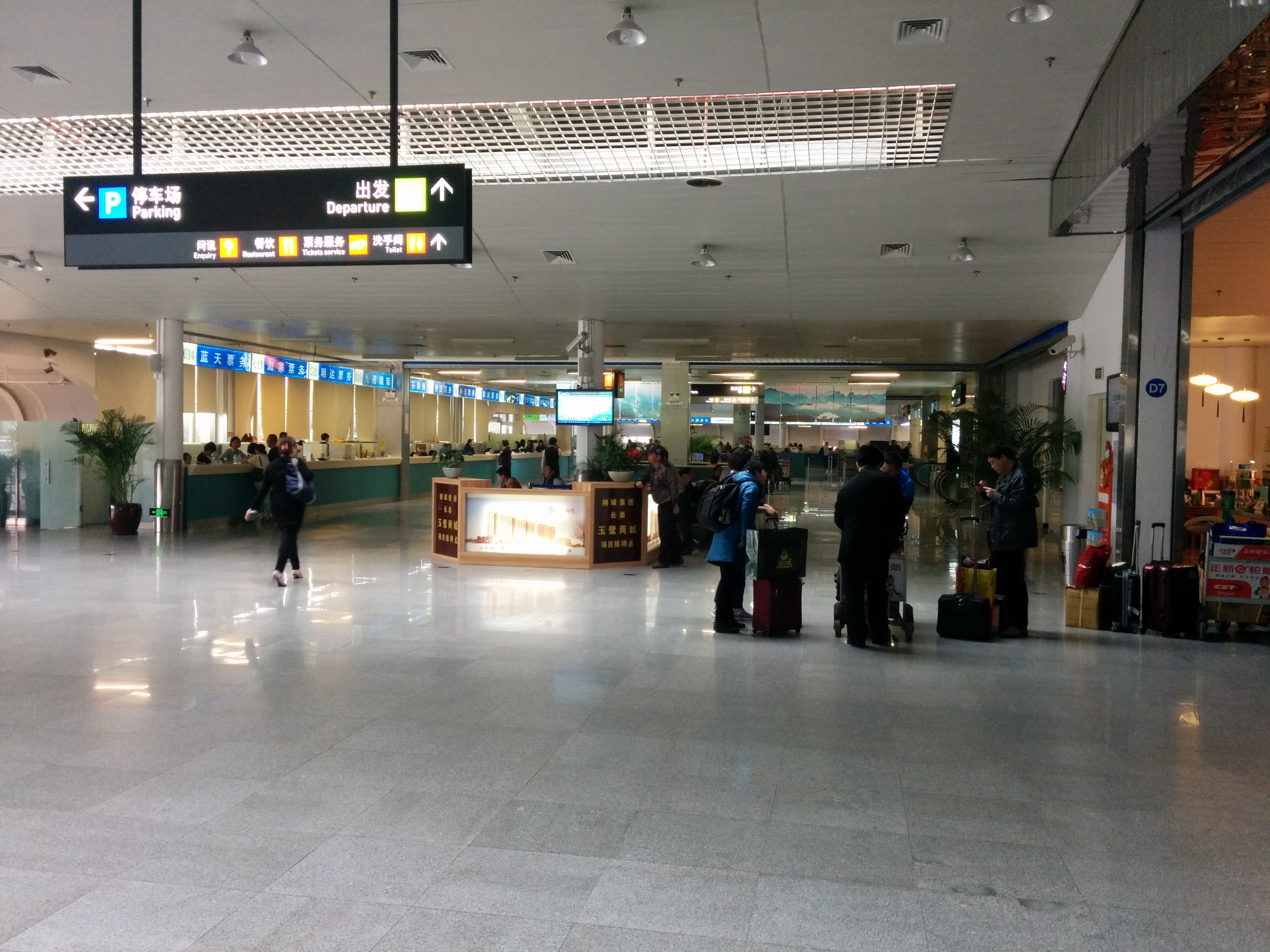
Looking from the Arrivals hall across to the Departures hall of the terminal building
