= Jiangong Islet =

Islet in Jincheng, Kinmen, Taiwan

Disputed island Native name: 建功嶼
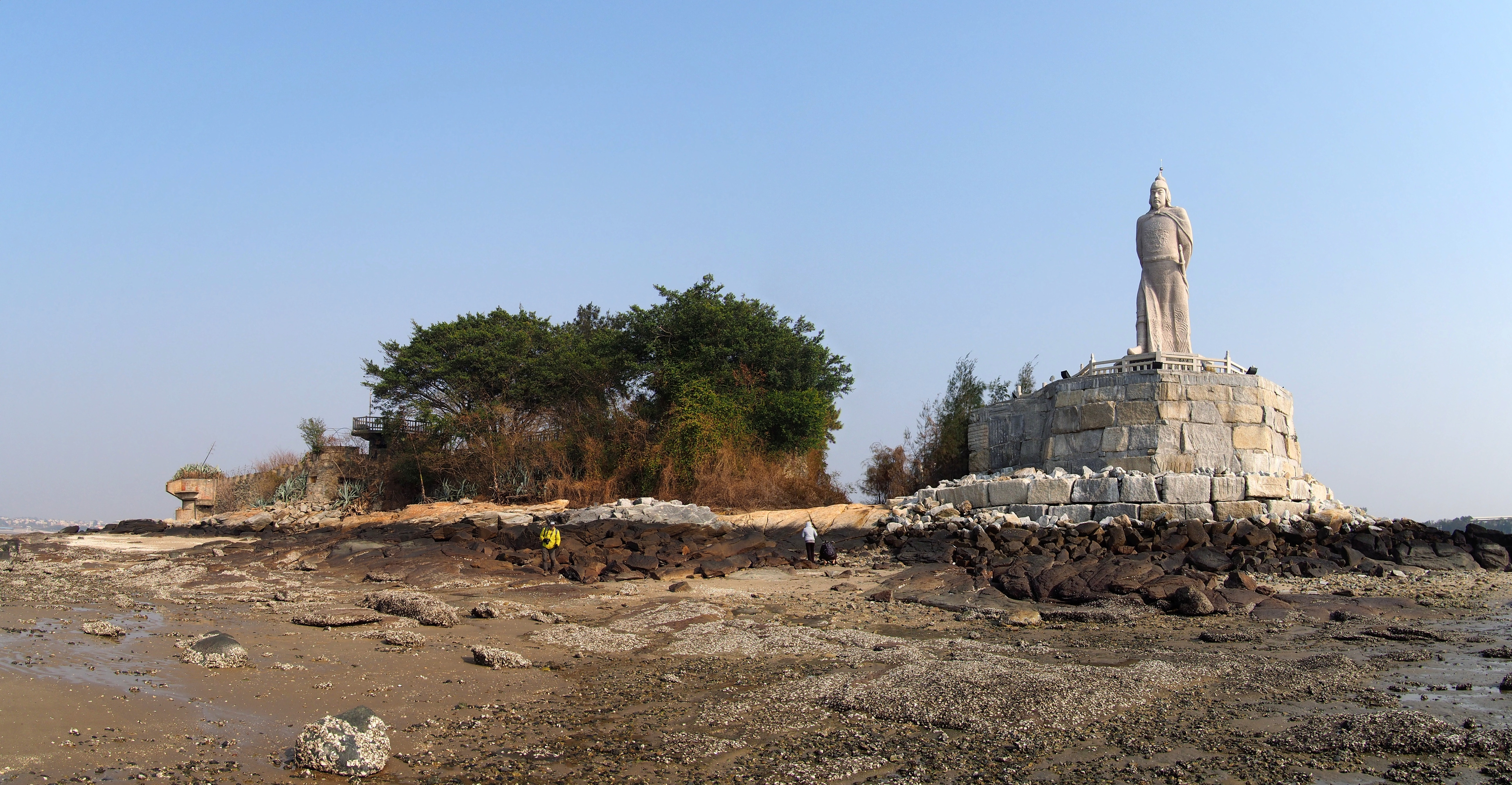

- Taiwan

Geography
- Location: Jincheng, Kinmen, Fujian, Republic of China (Taiwan)
- Coordinates: 24°25′38.8″N 118°18′00.3″E
- Total islands: 1
- Area: 500 m^{2} (5,400 sq ft)

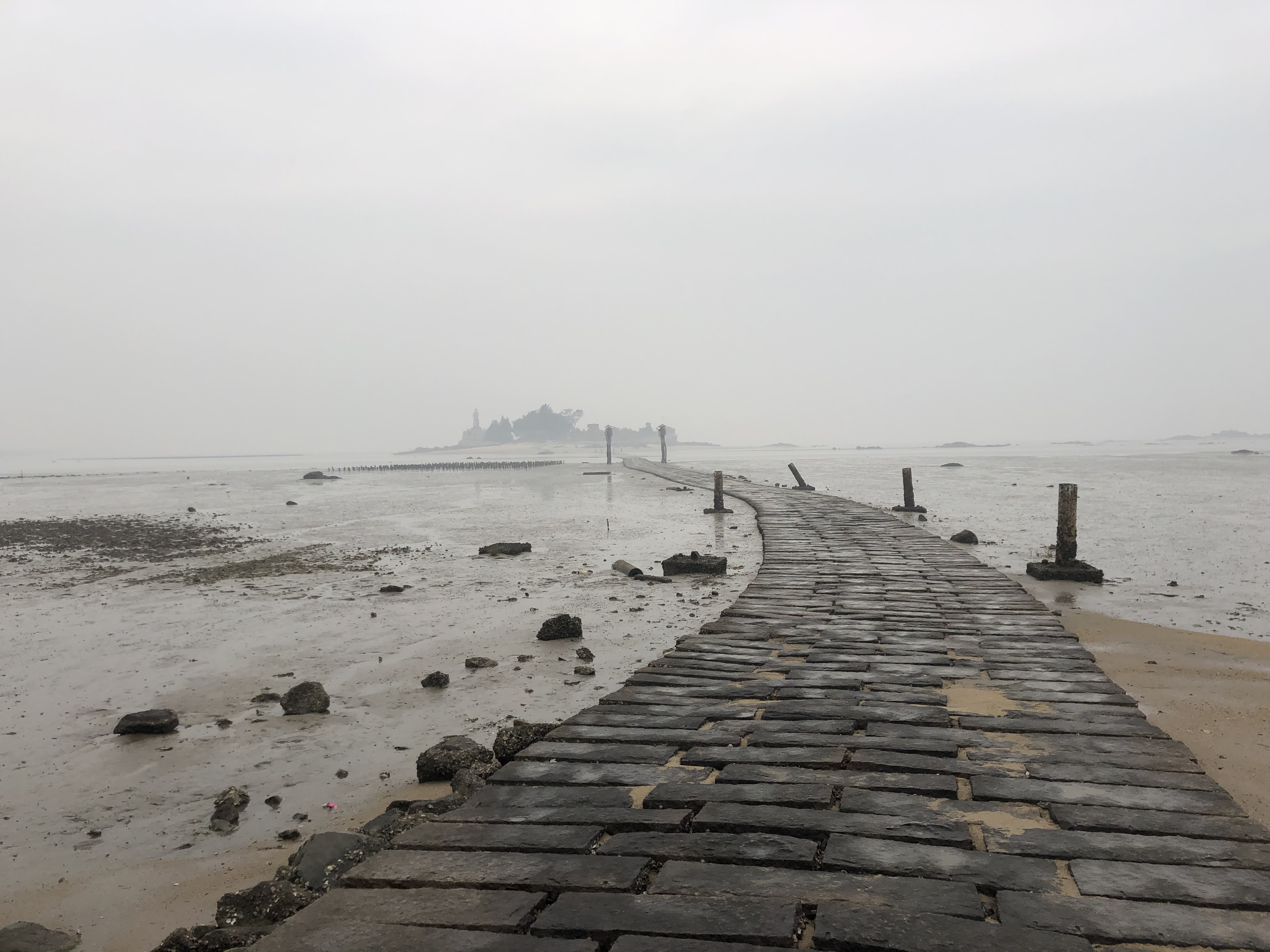
Jiangong is connected to main Kinmen island by a causeway which only appears in low tide

The Jiangong Islet (traditional Chinese: 建功嶼; simplified Chinese: 建功屿; pinyin: Jiàngōng Yǔ) (also Jiangong Yu) is a tidal island in Jincheng Township, Kinmen County, Fujian Province, Republic of China (Taiwan).

== History ==
The islet was originally named Chu Islet. In 1949, the Republic of China Armed Forces occupied the islet and built the Lion Fort, Andutou and Koxinga Shrine Barracks. In 1960, the Ministry of the Interior approved the renaming of the islet to become Jiangong Islet.

On 20 October 1997, the Kinmen Defense Command withdrew military personnel from the islet and Kinmen County Government resumed control of it. In 2002, the county government began restoring the area and opened to promote tourism. In September 2016, the islet was damaged by Typhoon Meranti. It was subsequently repaired with a cost of NT$6,410,000. The island was closed for reconstruction starting 20 December 2017. It was then reopened to the public in end of February 2018.

== Geology ==
The island has an area of 500 m^{2}. The island is connected to main Kinmen island by a causeway that only appears in low tide. Since the island opened to visitors, there have been multiple incidents of visitors being trapped on the island due to misunderstanding tide timing.

== Features ==
The island has a statue of Koxinga which was built in 1968 to commemorate the Ming Dynasty hero who led the resistance against Manchurian invaders. The islet also has a viewing platform offers a view of the surrounding area.

== See also ==
- List of islands of Taiwan
