= Binlang Islet =

Islet west of Lesser Kinmen, Taiwan

Coordinates: 24°26′12″N 118°11′56″E

Native name: 檳榔嶼
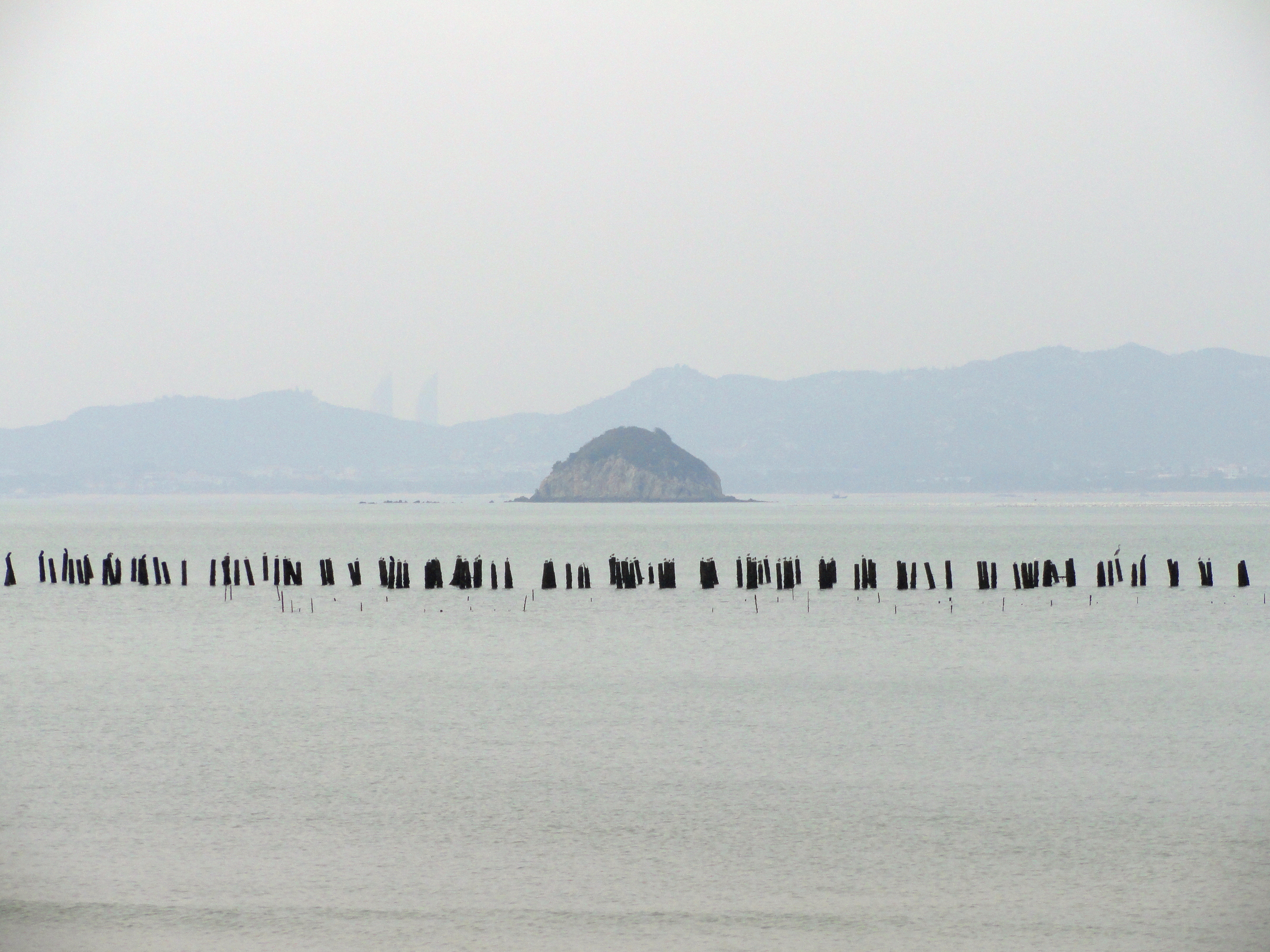
- Binlang Islet
- Interactive map of Binlang Islet

Geography
- Location: west of Lesser Kinmen/Lieyu in Lieyu Township, Kinmen County (Quemoy), Taiwan (ROC)

Administration
- Republic of China (Taiwan)
- County: Kinmen (Quemoy)
- Rural township: Lieyu

Additional information
- Time zone: National Standard Time (UTC+8)

Location of Binlang Islet

Binlang Islet (Chinese: 檳榔嶼; pinyin: bīn láng yǔ; Pe̍h-ōe-jī: pin-nn̂g-sū; lit. 'areca nut islet') is an islet located in Lieyu Township, Kinmen County (Quemoy), Taiwan (ROC). The islet can be seen from the shore near Lingshui Lake and from the shore near Shaxi Fort (沙溪堡) in the southwestern part of Lesser Kinmen (Lieyu) as well as from Siming District, Xiamen (Amoy), Fujian, China (PRC). The highest point on the islet is 47 m (154 ft) above sea level.

== History ==
Since 2006, a swimming competition has been held annually in which the competitors swim from the shore of Lesser Kinmen to that of Xiamen Island (Amoy). In the competition, Binlang Islet serves as a mid-way resting place.

In 2012, fishermen from mainland China were arrested for crossing into the prohibited area and collecting oysters at Binlang Islet.

In December 2018, it was discovered that oyster farming in the vicinity of Binlang Islet was being used as a cover for smuggling oysters to Taiwan.

On the morning of March 16, 2020, three ships from the Coast Guard Administration and Kinmen County government removed illegal fishing nets from the waters around Binlang Islet. More than ten unnamed fishing ships from mainland China were in Kinmen County waters. The mainland China ships rammed a Taiwan (ROC) ship and their crews threw bottles and rocks at the Taiwanese ships.

== Gallery ==
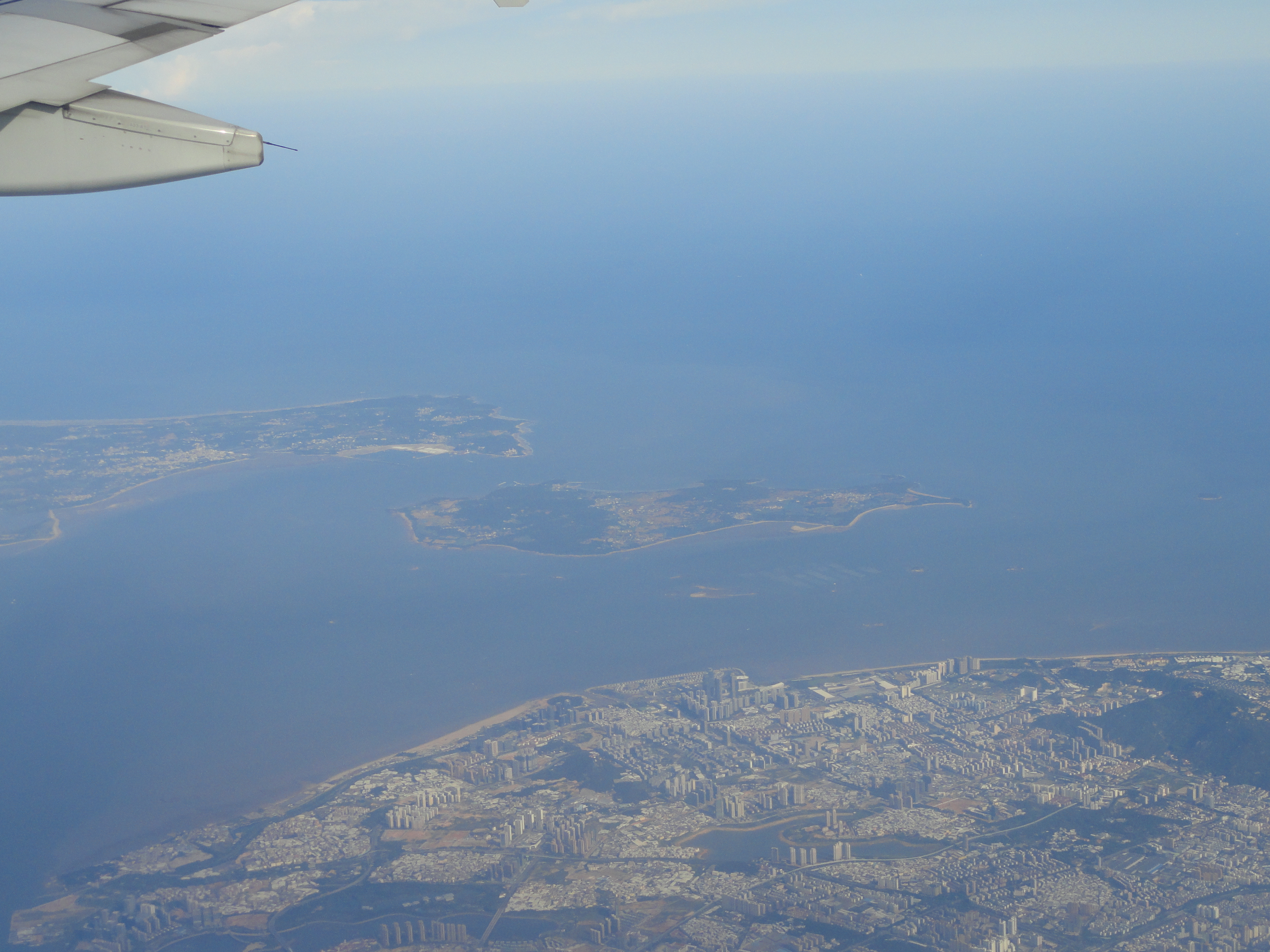
View of the Xiamen (Amoy) and Lesser Kinmen (Lieyu) from the air including Binlang Islet

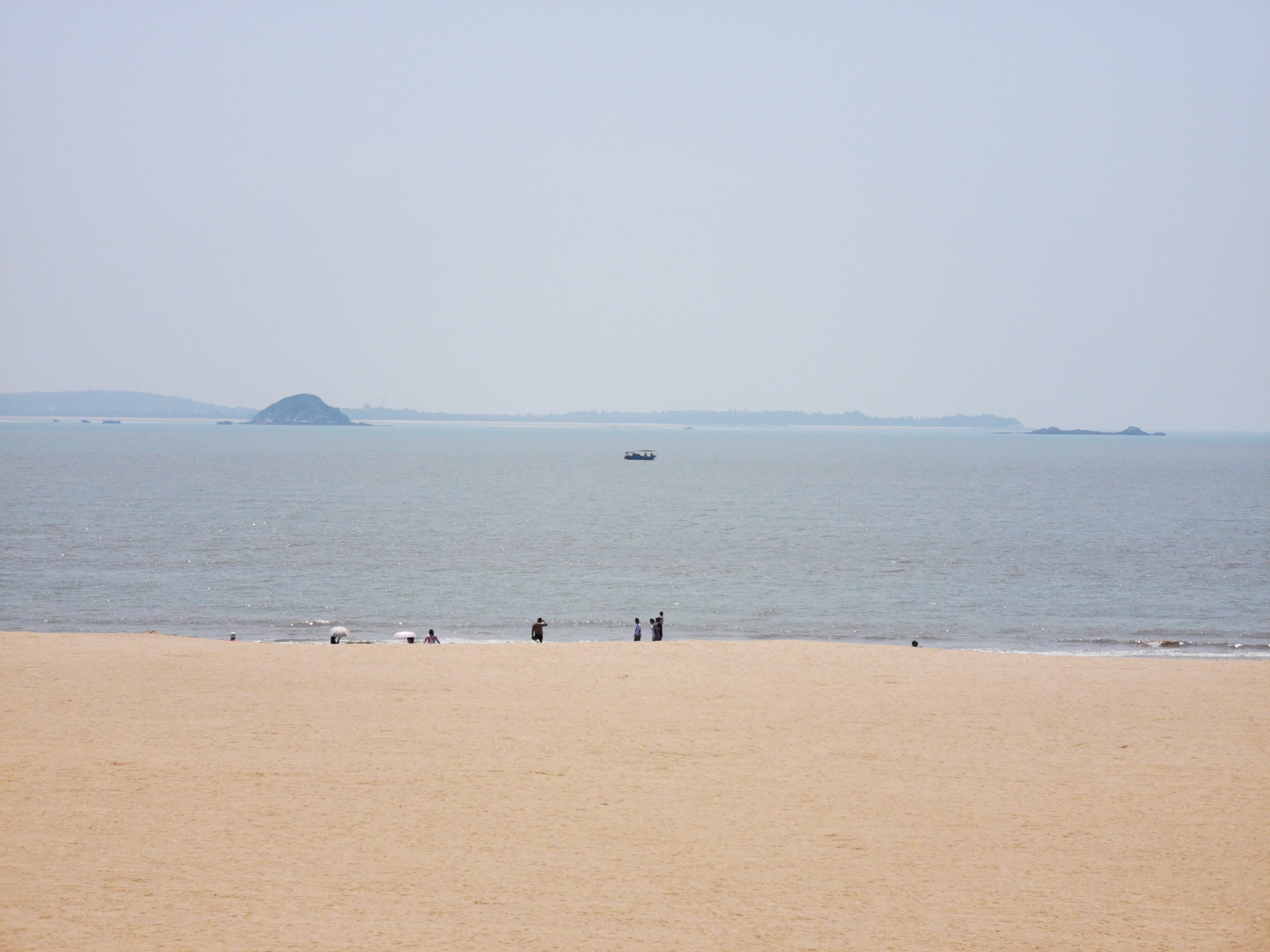
View of Binlang Islet from Xiamen's One country, two systems beach (center left)

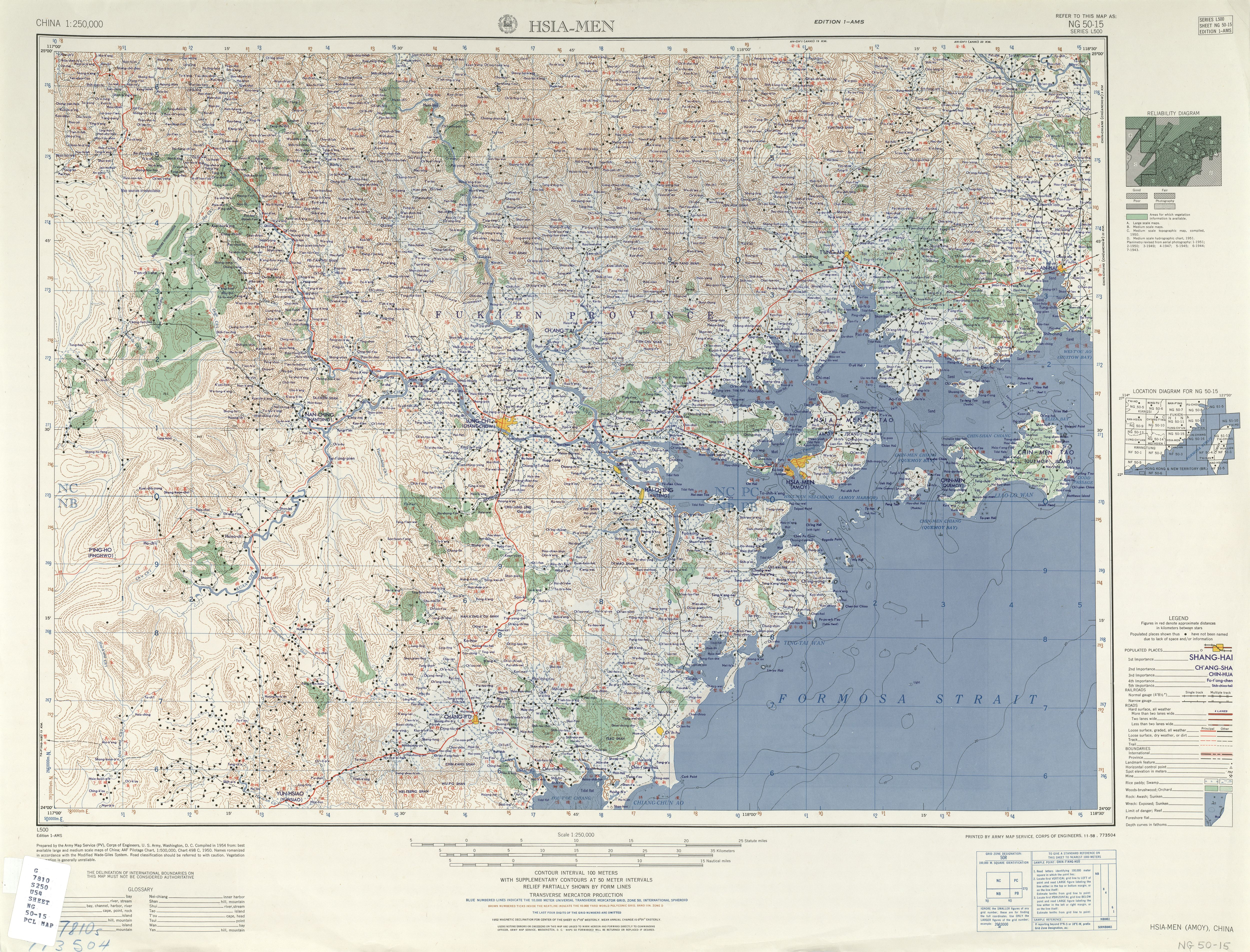
Map including Binlang Islet (unlabelled islet between Lesser Kinmen Island and Xiamen (Amoy) Island) (AMS, 1954)

== See also ==
- List of islands of Taiwan
- List of uninhabited islands
