= Siwei =

Siwei may refer to:

== People ==
- Cheng Siwei, Chinese economist, chemical engineer and politician
- MaSiWei (马思唯 Siwei Ma), member of Higher Brothers
- Zheng Siwei, Chinese badminton player

== Place ==
- Siwei Subdistrict, a township-level division of Jingxing Mining District, Shijiazhuang, Hebei, China
- Sihwei village (四維村), a village in Nangan Township, Lienchiang County

== See also ==
- Chou Hsi-wei (Jhou Siwei, 周錫瑋; pinyin: Zhōu Xíwěi), Taiwanese politician
- Jiugong Tunnel or Siwei Tunnel, a tunnel in Lieyu Township, Kinmen County
- Sihwei Elementary School metro station, a metro station of the Taichung Metro
