= Shuitou Pier =

Pier in Jincheng, Kinmen, Taiwan

Shuitou Pier 水頭碼頭
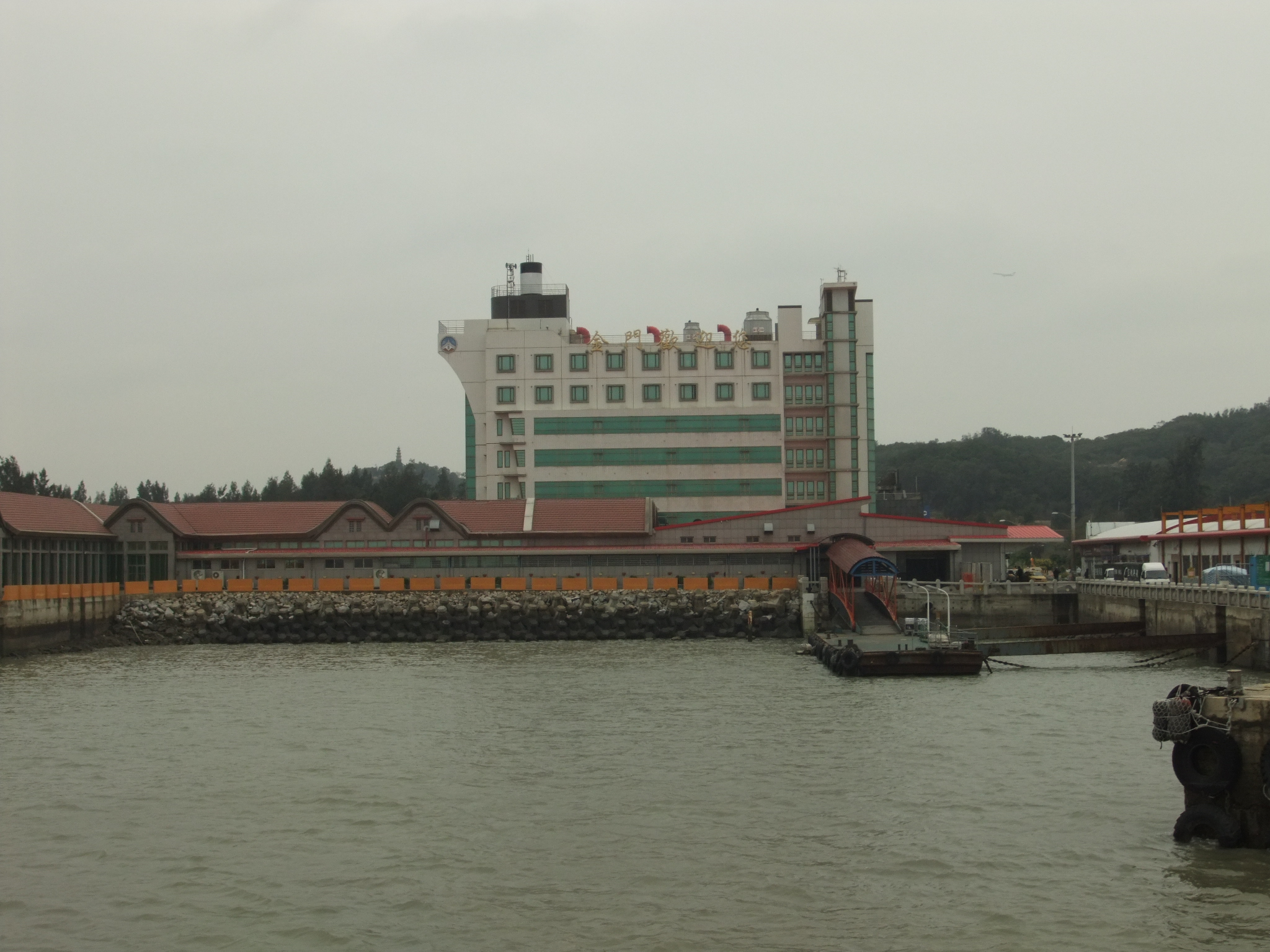
- Type: pier
- Location: Jincheng, Kinmen, Taiwan
- Coordinates: 24°24′58.5″N 118°17′11.1″E

The Shuitou Pier (traditional Chinese: 水頭碼頭; simplified Chinese: 水头码头; pinyin: Shuǐtóu Mǎtóu) is a pier in Jincheng Township, Kinmen County, Fujian Province, Republic of China.

== History ==
The pier area was originally a fishing harbor. On 30 October 2008, an inauguration ceremony was held at the pier to mark the installation of fire hydrant system using seawater to extinguish fire. The ceremony was attended by Kinmen County Magistrate Lee Chu-feng. The fire fighting system was installed by the Fire Bureau of Kinmen County Government.

== Routes and operation ==
Ferries departing from the pier go to Jiugong Pier in Lieyu Island. It also departs to Dongdu Port and Wutong Port in Xiamen and Shijing Port in Quanzhou. It operates 42 boats per day.

== Transportation ==
The pier is accessible by bus from Jincheng town center.

== See also ==
- Three Links
