= Jiugong Pier =

Pier in Lieyu, Kinmen, Taiwan

Jiugong Pier 九宮碼頭
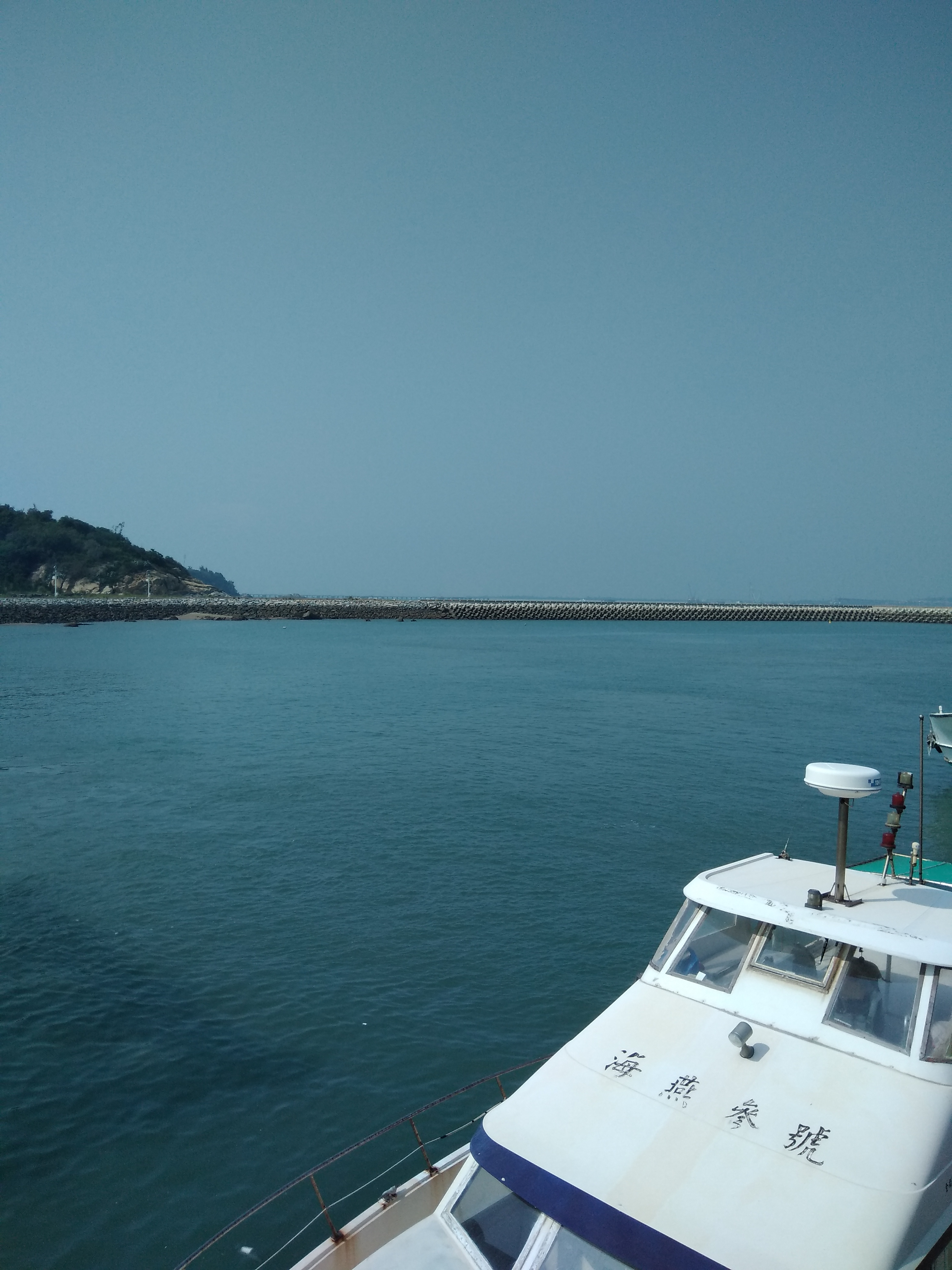
- Type: pier
- Location: Lieyu, Kinmen, Taiwan
- Coordinates: 24°25′32.6″N 118°15′50.8″E

Characteristics
- Total length: 40.5 m (133 ft)
- Width: 7 m (23 ft)

History
- Opening date: 1974

The Jiugong Pier (traditional Chinese: 九宮碼頭; simplified Chinese: 九宫码头; pinyin: Jiǔgōng Mǎtóu) is a pier in Lieyu Township, Kinmen County, Taiwan.

== History ==
The pier was built in 1974. In 1986, it was extended by 40.5 meters long and 7 meters wide.

== Destinations ==
The pier serves for destination to Shuitou Pier in Jincheng Township, Greater Kinmen Island.

== Transportation ==
The pier features a scooter rental nearby for visitors to use to tour around the island.

== See also ==
- List of tourist attractions in Taiwan
