= Bada Tower =

Tower in Lieyu, Kinmen, Taiwan

- 八達樓子
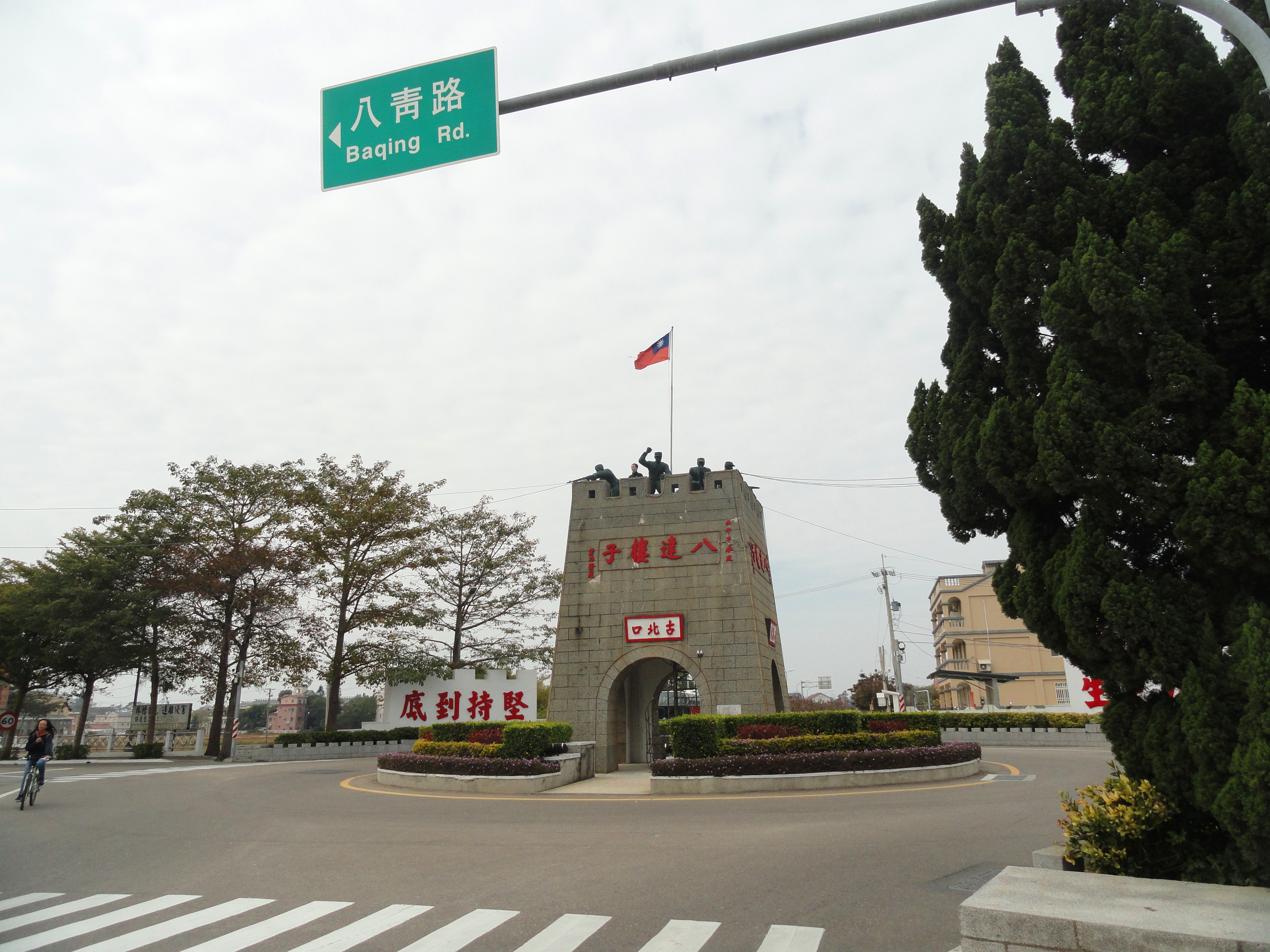
- Interactive map of Bada Tower
- Location: Lieyu, Kinmen, Taiwan
- Coordinates: 24°25′38″N 118°14′33″E
- Type: tower
- Completion date: 1963
- Dedicated to: Fallen seven soldiers in Gubeikou, Peking in 1933

The Bada Tower (traditional Chinese: 八達樓子; simplified Chinese: 八达楼子; pinyin: Bādá Lóuzi) is a tower in Lieyu Township, Kinmen County, Taiwan.

== History ==
The tower was constructed in 1963 by the Republic of China Armed Forces to commemorate the fallen seven soldiers from the 1st squad, regiment 145 from the 25th division in Gubeikou, Peking in 1933 in holding back thousands of Imperial Japanese Army during the Anti-Japanese War.

== Architecture ==
The 8-meter tower is located at the center of a roundabout. On top of it stand statues of soldiers. The propaganda words surrounding the tower reads Fight Independently, Persevere and Survive Death.

== See also ==
- List of tourist attractions in Taiwan
