= Lieyu =

Lieyu 烈嶼鄉 Liehyu, Lieh Hsu
- Rural township
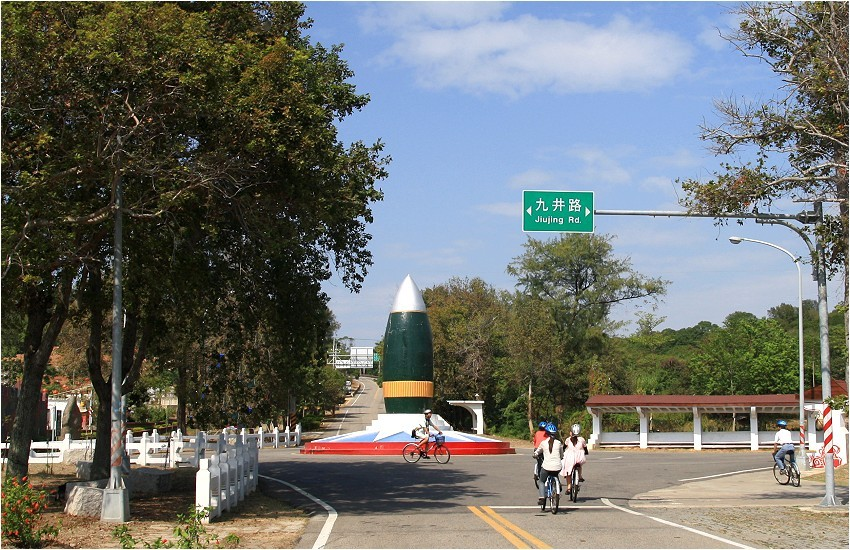
- Monument to the August 23 Artillery Battle at the junction of Hupu Road and Jiujing Road

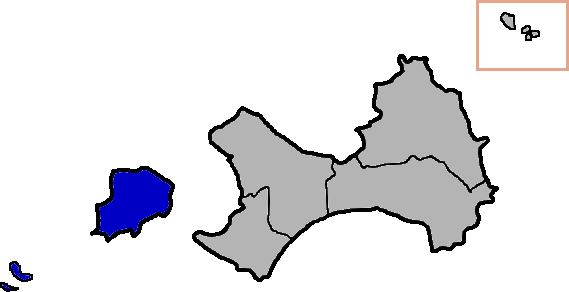
- Lieyu Township (blue) in Kinmen County (grey)

- Location in the Republic of China (Taiwan)
- Coordinates: 24°25′41″N 118°14′06″E
- Country: Taiwan (Republic of China)
- County: Kinmen (Quemoy)
- Established: 1949
- Rural villages: 5

Government
  - Mayor: Hung Juo-Shan (洪若珊)

Area
  - Total: 17.155 km^{2} (6.624 sq mi)

Population (February 2023)
  - Total: 12,738
  - Density: 742.52/km^{2} (1,923.1/sq mi)
- Time zone: UTC+8 (National Standard Time)
- Website: lieyu.kinmen.gov.tw

Lieyu Township (Liehyu; Chinese: 烈嶼鄉; pinyin: Lièyǔ Xiāng; Pe̍h-ōe-jī: Lia̍t-sū Hiong) is a rural township in Kinmen County, Taiwan. It consists mainly of three islands located to the west of Greater Kinmen and immediately to the east of Xiamen (Amoy). The township encompasses islands of Lesser Kinmen (Chinese: 小金門; pinyin: Xiǎojīnmén), Dadan, and Erdan.

== Name ==
According to tradition, Greater Kinmen and Lesser Kinmen were originally one island. Lieyu was split-off (裂; liè) from Kinmen Island, hence the name Lieyu.

== History ==
Map including Lieyu (1869)

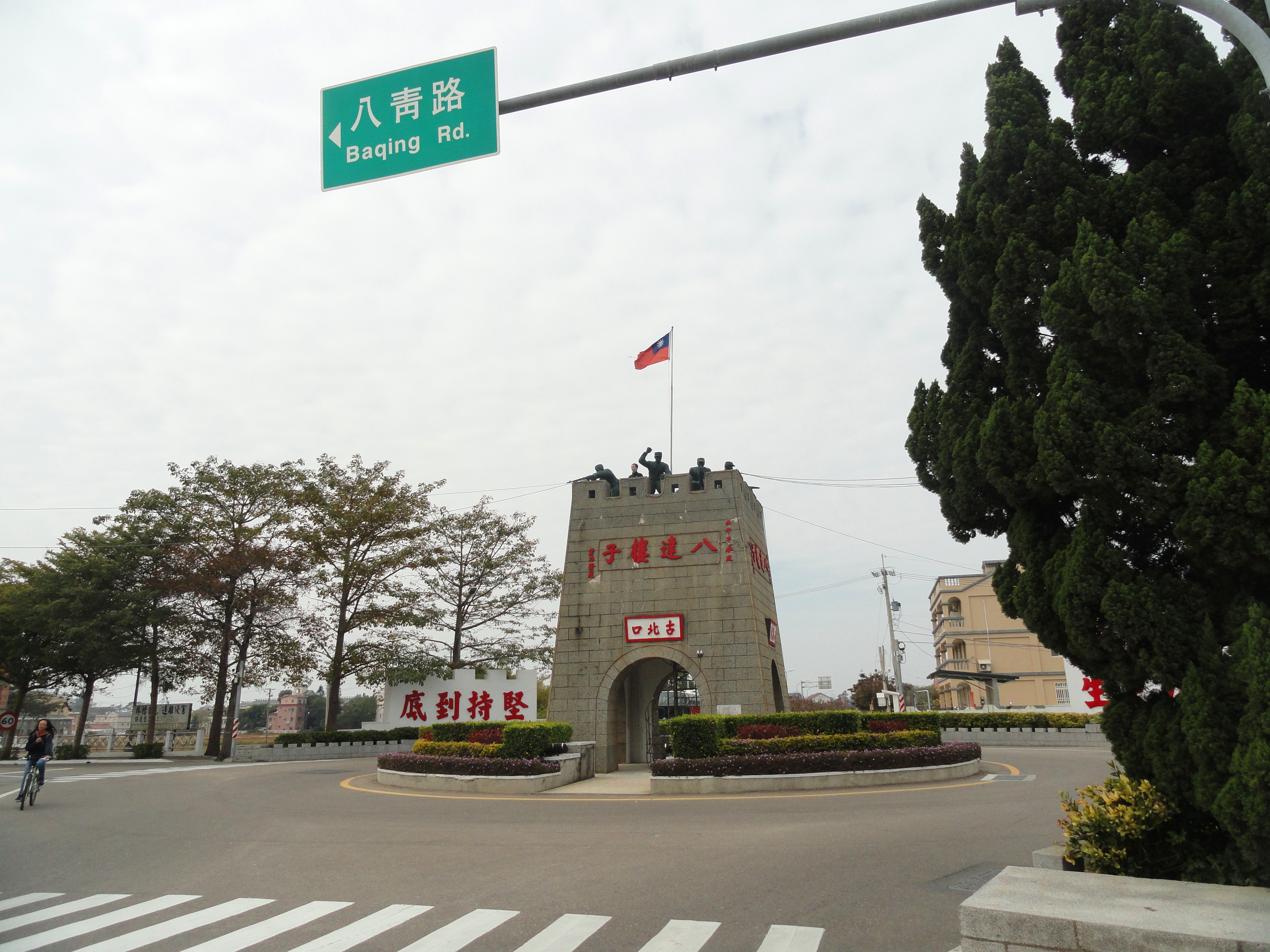
WWII monument of 7 martyrs fending a fortress of Great Wall of China in 1933, built in 1966

External image
- Declassified nuclear strike plan shows subtle strategic geography significance among Kinmen Islets

The first people arrived from the Central Plains of China during the Tang dynasty and quickly developed the island. The population quickly multiplied. During the Tang dynasty, a horse pasture was set up on the island. During the Song dynasty, a salt works was constructed. During the Ming dynasty, a frontier command was constructed. During the Qing dynasty, a garrison was sent to protect against Japanese pirates.

On July 26, 1950, ROC forces on the Dadan Island, in total 298 soldiers, repulsed an attack from a People's Liberation Army force of 700 soldiers that landed on the island.

In January 1985, eight Chinese fishermen from a stranded boat were executed on Shi Islet by military orders.

Donggang Bay, Lieyu Island, was the site of 1987 Lieyu massacre, where nineteen or more Vietnamese refugees were killed on March 7, 1987 by the ROC armed forces.

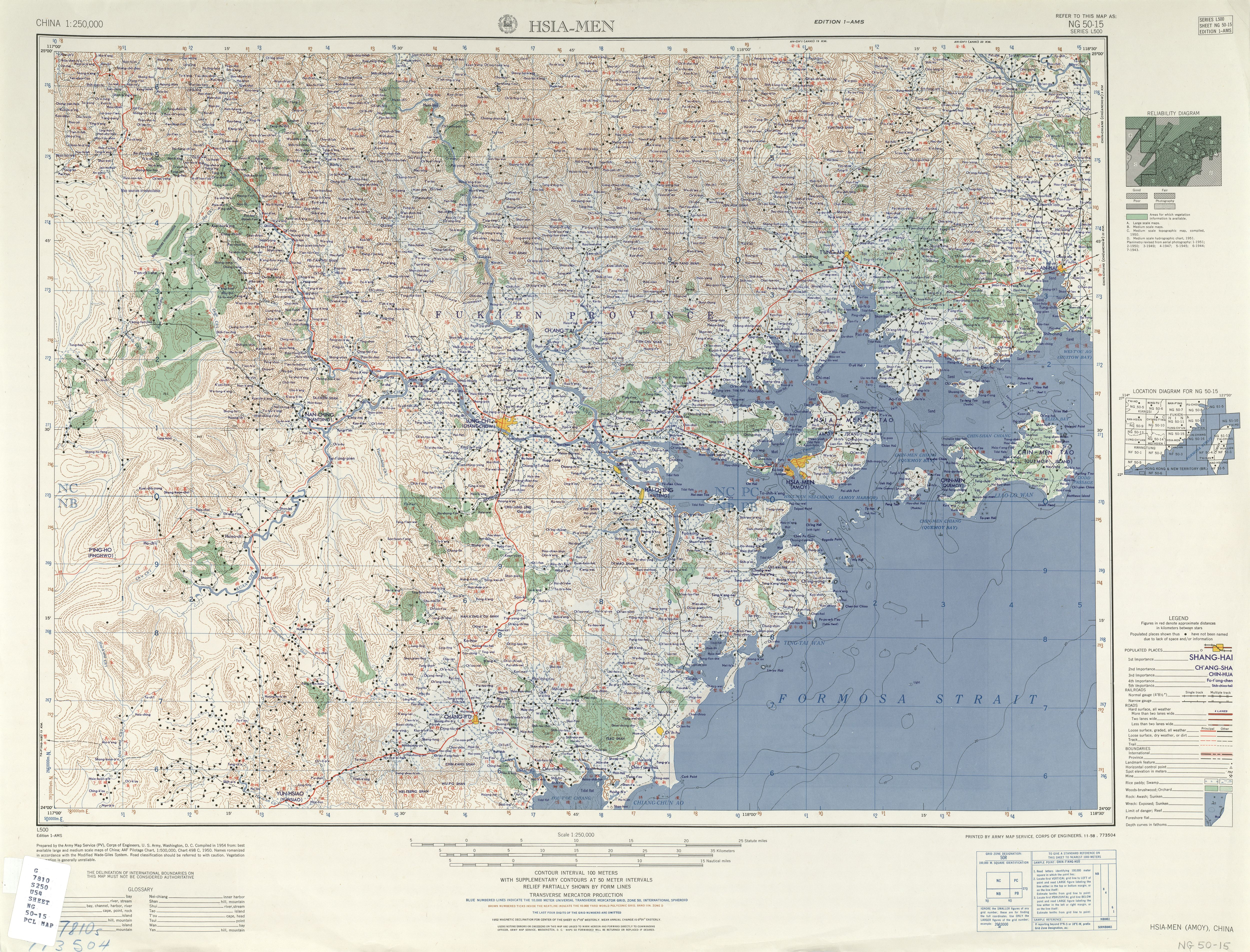
Map including Lieyu (labelled as Lieh Hsü (Little Quemoy)) (AMS, 1954)

== Geography ==
The island of Lesser Kinmen is situated outside the mouth of mainland China's Jiulong River and inside Xiamen's harbor. The distance from mainland China at the closest point is only about 5,000 m (16,000 ft) and is located in a very strategic position.

Lieyu Township includes numerous islands and islets. Some of the larger among those islands and islets include:

- Lesser Kinmen (Hsiao Kinmen, Lieyu; 小金門, 烈嶼)
- Dadan Island (大膽島) (5 km (3.1 mi) to the southwest of Lesser Kinmen)
- Erdan Island (二膽島) (6 km (3.7 mi) to the southwest of Lesser Kinmen)
- Sandan, Sidan, and Wudan
- Fuxing Islet (Fuhsing Islet; Phaktia) (復興嶼)
- Menghu Islet (Tiger Island) (猛虎嶼)
- Shi Islet (Lion Islet) (獅嶼)
- Binlang Islet ('Areca Nut Islet') (檳榔嶼)

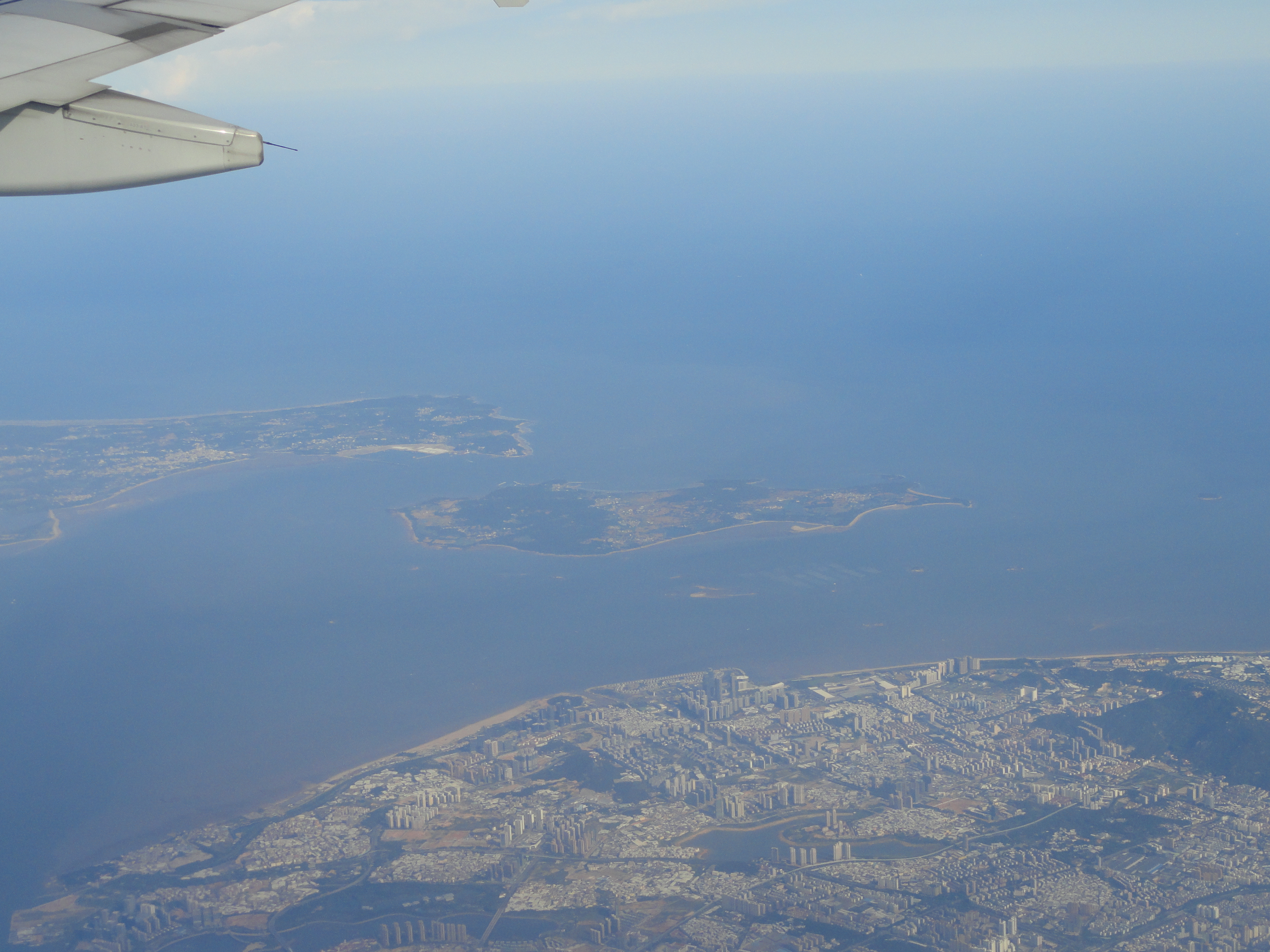
Xiamen City (bottom), Kinmen (left), Lieyu (center of photograph) and surrounding islands

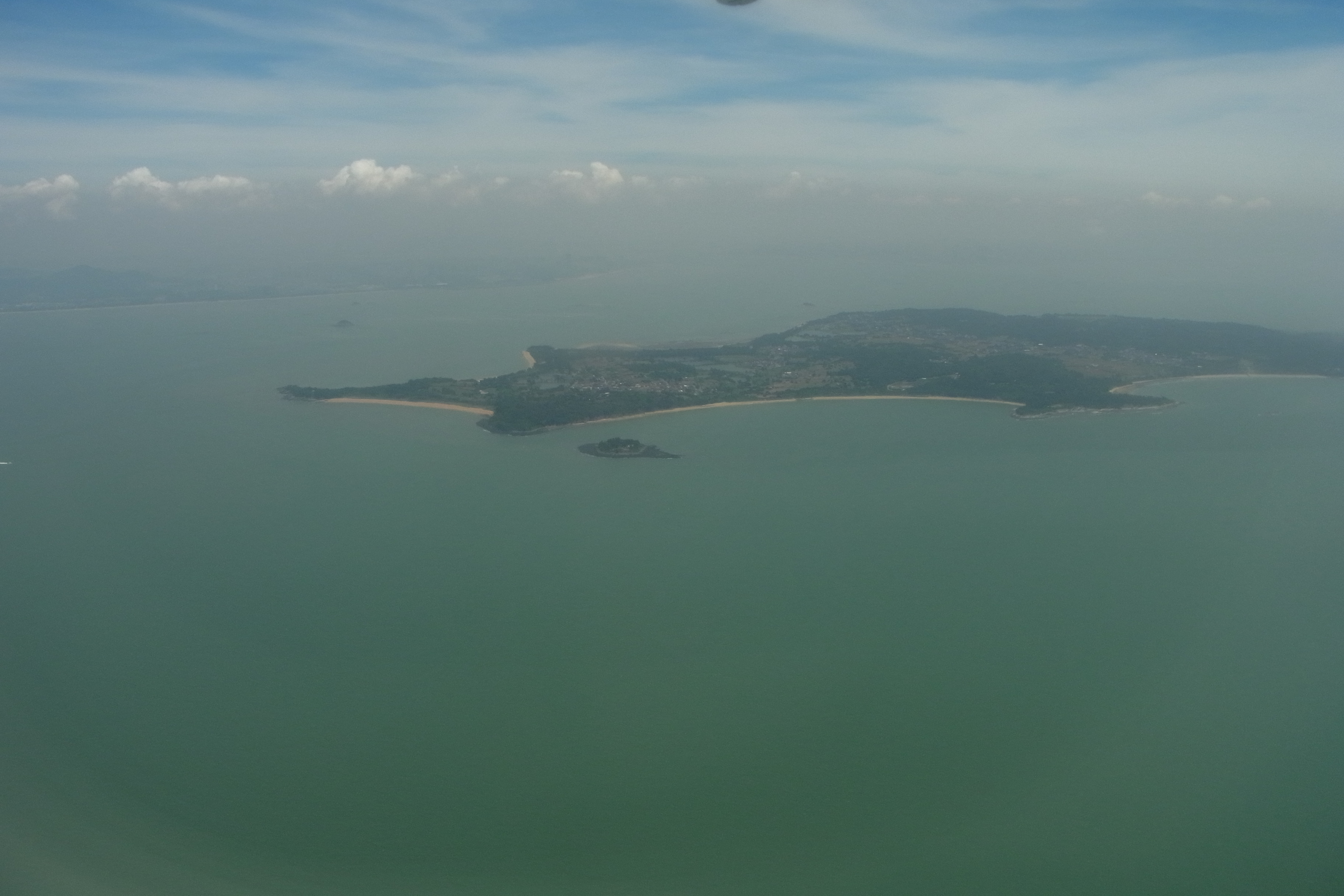
View from the south shore of Lieyu: the center is Fuxing Islet; the right side is Donggang Bay and Peninsula, Donglin Shore; left side are Nanshantou & Shaxi Capes; far left in background is Xiamen with Binlang and Shi Islets in between

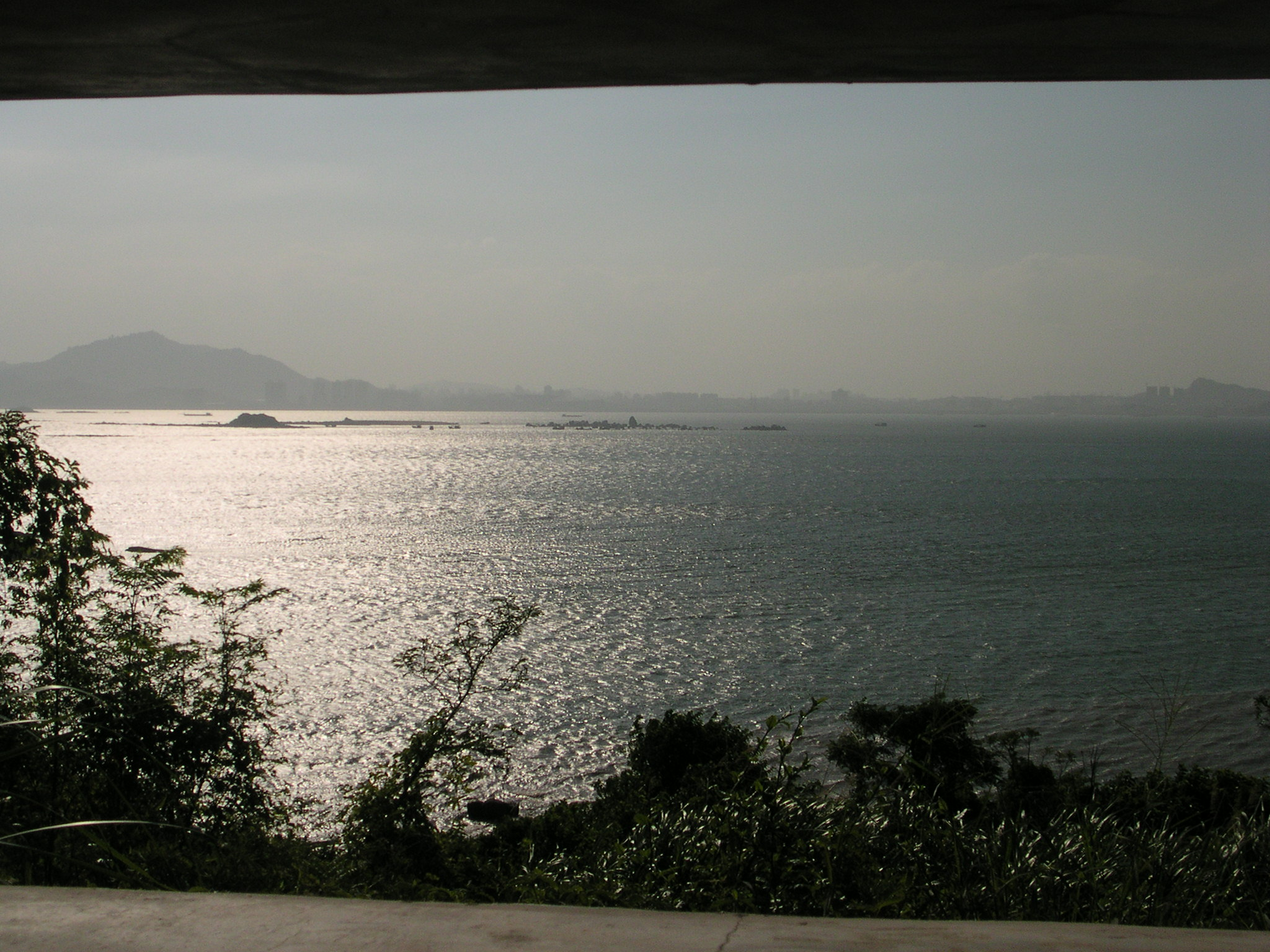
View from north shore of Lieyu: near mid-left is Binlang Islet on low tide; Xiamen City on the background

== Administrative divisions ==
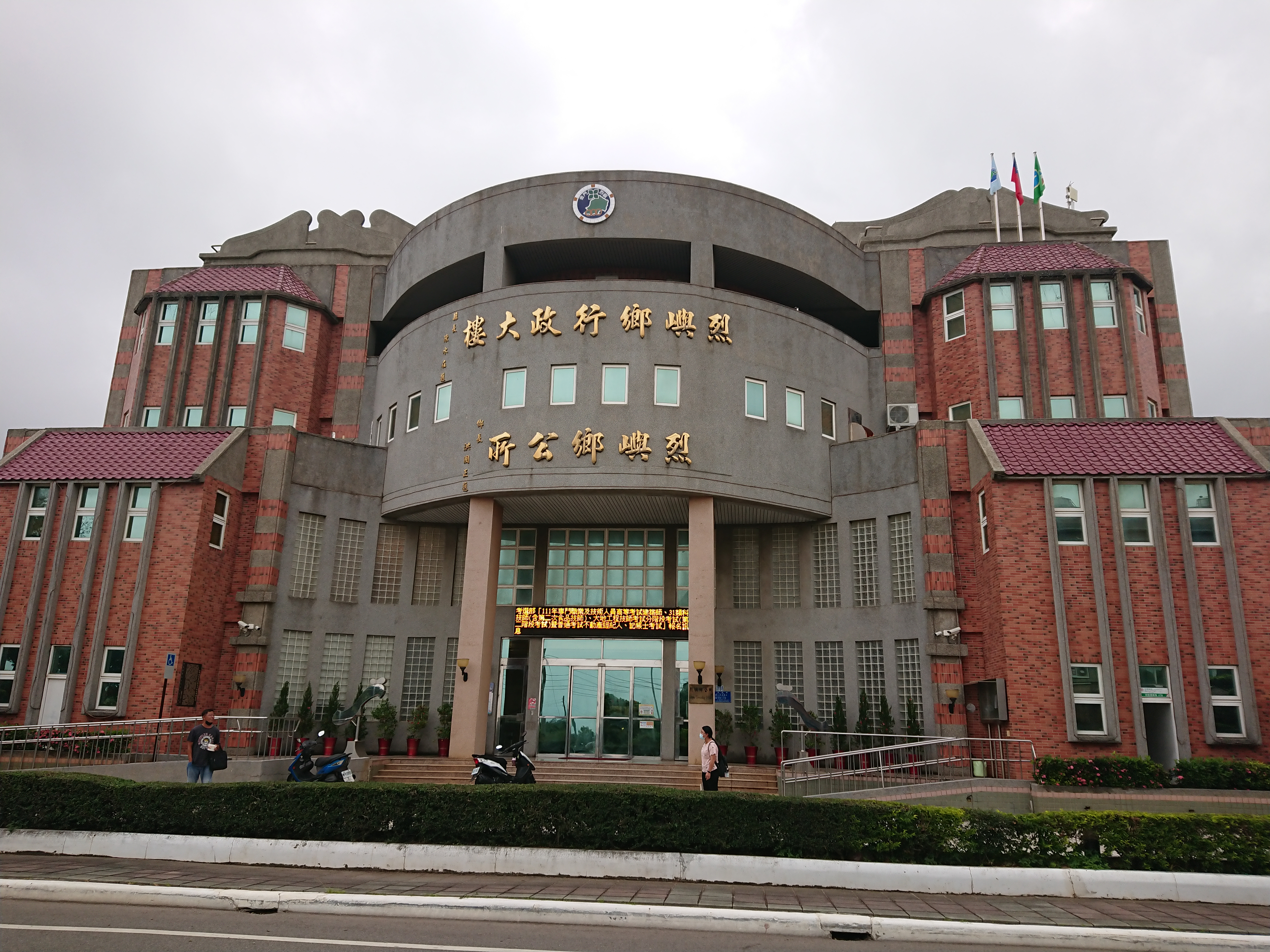
Lieyu Township Office

Lieyu Township is divided into five rural villages:

- Linhu Village (林湖村)
- Shangqi/Shangchi Village (上岐村)
- Xikou/Sikou Village (西口村)
- Huangpu Village (黃埔村)
- Shanglin Village (上林村)

== Infrastructure ==
- Xihu Reservoir

== Tourist attractions ==
- Bada Tower
- Dadan Island
- Erdan Island
- Hujingtou Battle Museum
- Jiugong Tunnel
- Landmine Museum
- Lieyu Township Culture Museum
- Lingshui Lake

== Transportation ==
=== Water ===
The township houses one ferry pier named Jiugong Pier which sails to Shuitou Pier in Jincheng Township, Greater Kinmen Island.

=== Road ===
Since 2022, Lieyu Township is connected to Jinning Township in Greater Kinmen Island by Kinmen Bridge.

== See also ==
- List of islands of Taiwan
