= Xihu Reservoir =

- Purpose: public water supply
- Construction began: July 1969

Xihu Reservoir (Chinese: 西湖水庫; pinyin: Xīhú shuǐkù), also known as Hsi-Hu Reservoir, is a reservoir located on the west side of Lieyu Township ("Little Kinmen"), Kinmen County, Taiwan. It is the largest reservoir in Little Kinmen.

The construction of the Xihu Reservoir started in July 1969 and was completed in August 1970.

Xihu Reservoir has a catchment area of 3.87 square kilometers, its dam is 900 meters long and 2.3 meters high, with a storage capacity of over 140,000 cubic meters.
