= Lieyu Township Culture Museum =

Museum in Lieyu, Kinmen, Taiwan

- 烈嶼鄉文化館
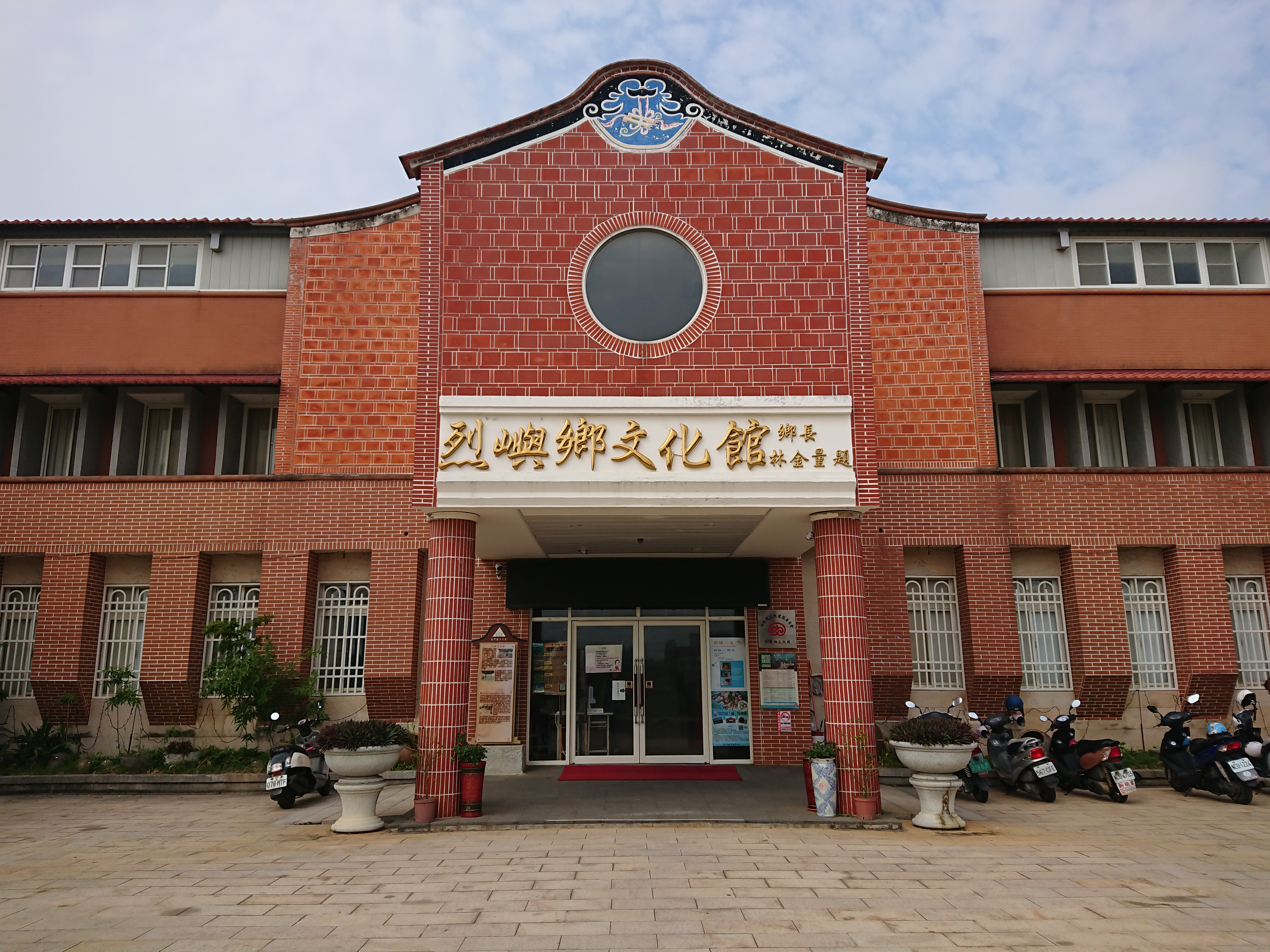
- Established: 2006
- Location: Lieyu, Kinmen, Taiwan
- Coordinates: 24°25′53″N 118°14′41″E
- Type: museum
- Collection size: 500 (historical relics), 100 (old documents), 300 (old photos)

The Lieyu Township Culture Museum (traditional Chinese: 烈嶼鄉文化館; simplified Chinese: 烈屿乡文化馆; pinyin: Lièyǔ Xiāng Wénhuà Guǎn) is a museum in Lieyu Township, Kinmen County, Taiwan.

== History ==
The museum established in 2006 in the former building of Lieyu Township Office.

== Architecture ==
The museum spans over an area of more than 1,000 m^{2} in two floors. The ground floor consists of exhibition gallery, activity center and video room, while the upper floor consists of regular and special exhibits.

== Exhibitions ==
The museum exhibits the local daily culture artifacts, including military items. It displays 500 pieces of historical relics, 100 pieces of old documents and 300 pieces of old photos and military documents.
