= Fuxing Islet =

Islet west of Taiwan

Coordinates: 24.4035257°N 118.230326°E

Native name: 復興嶼 (Chinese)
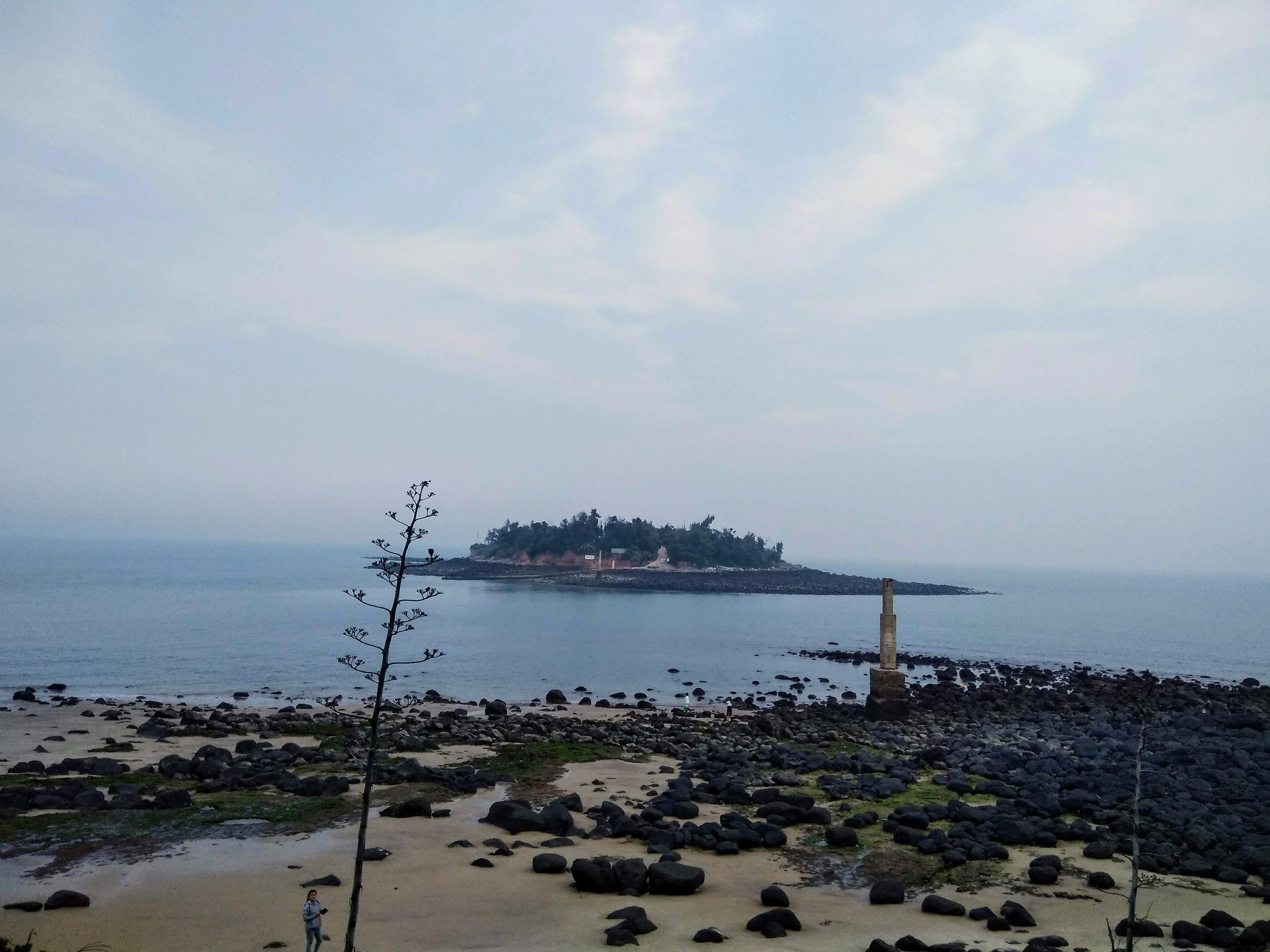
- Fuxing Islet, as seen from the shore of Lesser Kinmen (Lieyu)
- Interactive map of Fuxing Islet

Geography
- Location: south of Lesser Kinmen / Lieyu in Lieyu Township, Kinmen County (Quemoy), Fujian, Republic of China (Taiwan)
- Area: 0.0500 km^{2} (0.0193 sq mi)

Administration
- Republic of China (Taiwan)
- Province: Fujian (streamlined)
- County: Kinmen (Quemoy)
- Rural Township: Lieyu

Additional information
- Time zone: National Standard Time (UTC+8)

Location of Fuxing Islet

Fuxing Islet (Chinese: 復興嶼; pinyin: Fùxīng Yǔ; Wade–Giles: Fu^{4}-hsing^{1} Yü^{3}; Pe̍h-ōe-jī: Ho̍k-heng-sū; lit. 'rejuvenation islet') (Fuhsing Islet, 后宅嶼 Hou-chai Hsü) is an islet located south of Lesser Kinmen (Lieyu) in Lieyu Township, Kinmen County (Quemoy), Fujian Province, Republic of China (Taiwan). The name of the islet was originally Phaktia (Chinese: 覆鼎嶼; pinyin: Fùdǐng Yǔ; Pe̍h-ōe-jī: Phak-tiáⁿ-sū; lit. 'inverted rice-boiler islet').

== History ==
On August 31, 1975, then-Premier Chiang Ching-kuo visited the islet and met with the soldiers stationed there.

On the night of October 19, 2016, the Coast Guard seized a fishing boat with a four man crew captained by a native of Fujian, PRC that was found operating 0.2 nautical miles from Fuhsing Islet (Fuxing Islet). In October 2016, the Coast Guard had arrested thirty-four crewman from ten Chinese boats in the Kinmen County area.

== Gallery ==
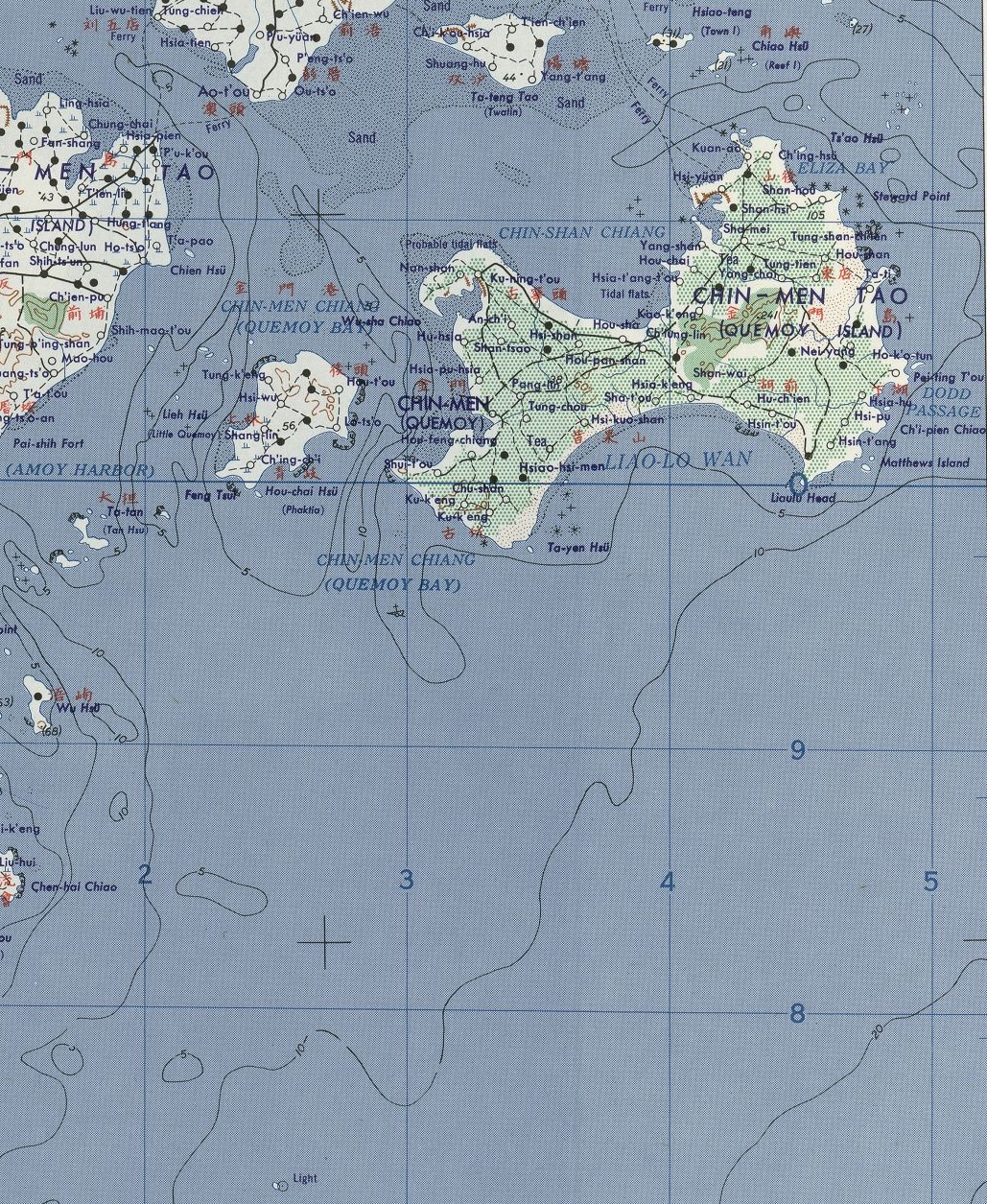
Map of most of Kinmen County including Fuxing Islet (labelled as Hou-chai Hsü (Phaktia)) (AMS, 1954)

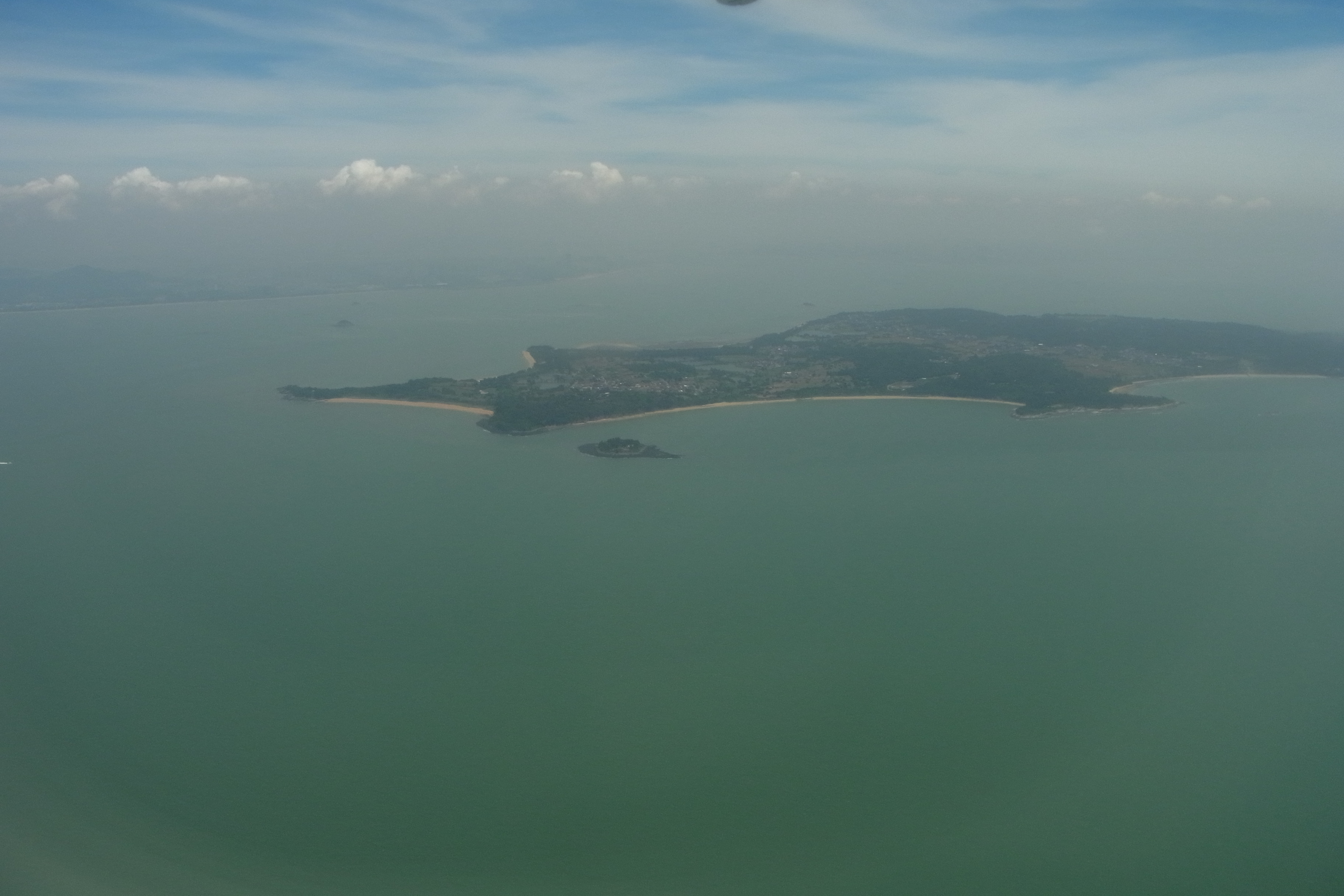
Fuxing Islet (islet near the center of photograph) off the coast of Lesser Kinmen (the larger island of Lieyu Township)

== See also ==
- List of islands of Taiwan
