= Hujingtou Battle Museum =

Museum in Lieyu, Kinmen, Taiwan

- 湖井頭戰史館
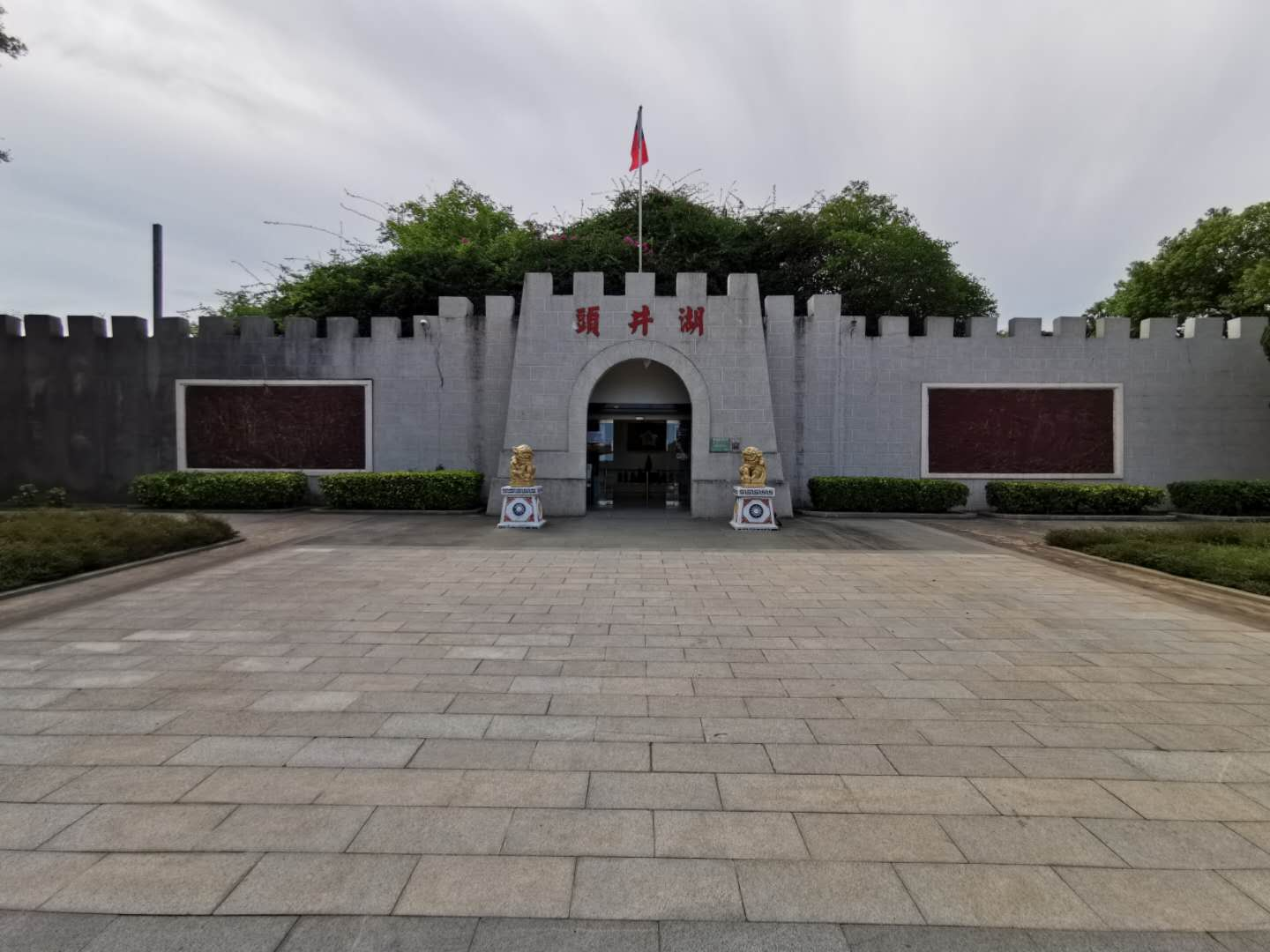
- Established: 1989
- Location: Lieyu, Kinmen, Taiwan
- Coordinates: 24°26′47″N 118°13′52″E
- Type: museum

The Hujingtou Battle Museum (traditional Chinese: 湖井頭戰史館; simplified Chinese: 湖井头战史馆; pinyin: Hújǐngtóu Zhànshǐguǎn) is a museum in Kinmen National Park, Lieyu Township, Kinmen County, Taiwan.

== History ==
During the Chief of the General Staff's visit to Lieyu on 19 August 1988, he found out that there was no battle museum on the island. He then instructed the commander of the 158th division to construct the museum. The museum was built and opened on 19 January 1989.

== Exhibitions ==
The museum displays the battle history, observation post and broadcasting station.

== See also ==
- List of museums in Taiwan
