= Landmine Museum =

Museum in Lieyu, Kinmen, Taiwan

- 地雷展示馆
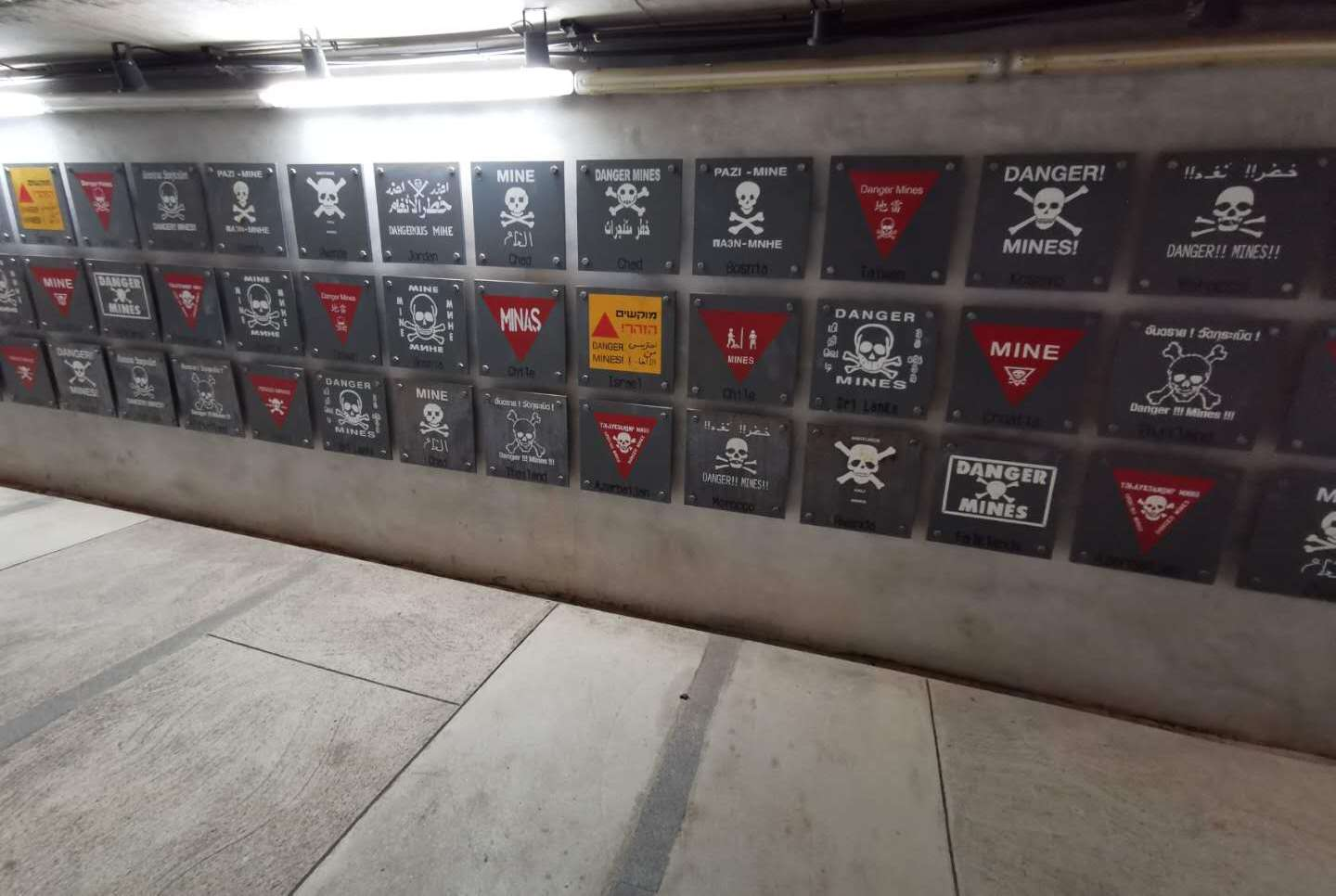
- Established: 2012
- Location: Lieyu, Kinmen, Taiwan
- Coordinates: 24°26′50.6″N 118°15′07.6″E
- Type: museum

The Landmine Museum (traditional Chinese: 地雷展示館; simplified Chinese: 地雷展示馆; pinyin: Dìléi Zhǎnshì Guǎn) is a museum in Lieyu Township, Kinmen County, Taiwan.

== History ==
The museum was opened in mid 2012 by capitalizing the military history left from the Taiwan Strait Crisis legacies.

== Architecture ==
The museum is located inside an underground tunnel connecting Tiehan Fort (Chinese: 鐵漢堡) and Yongshi Fort (Chinese: 勇士堡).

== Exhibitions ==
The museum displays various information on the history and different types of land mines.
