= Lingshui Lake =

Lake in Lieyu, Kinmen, Taiwan

- 陵水湖 (Chinese)
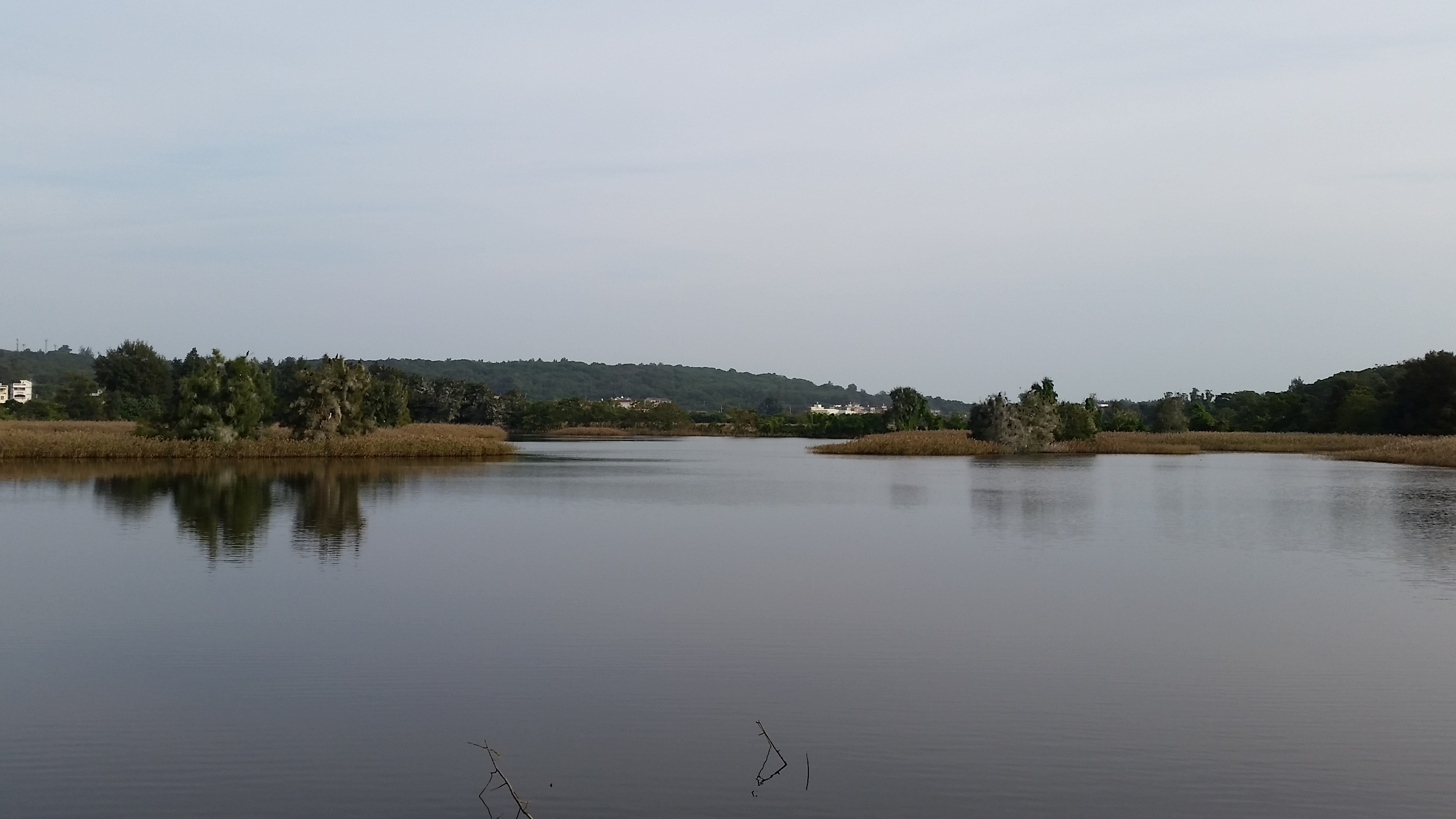

- Taiwan
- Location: Lieyu, Kinmen, Taiwan
- Coordinates: 24°25′26.4″N 118°13′33.6″E
- Type: lake
- Built: 1963
- First flooded: 1963
- Surface area: 386 hectares (950 acres)

The Lingshui Lake (Chinese: 陵水湖; pinyin: Língshuǐ Hú; Pe̍h-ōe-jī: Niā-tsuí Ô͘) is a lake in Lieyu Township, Kinmen County, Taiwan.

== History ==
The lake used to be a lowland area and dry lake since Yuan Dynasty. The production of the salt was discontinued in 1946. In 1963, the Republic of China Armed Forces dug the area and converted into a freshwater lake with three levees to prevent the area from flooding.

== Geology ==
The lake spans over an area of 386 hectares (950 acres) and divided into three areas by dikes, which are the inner, middle and outer. It forms a swamp for the habitat of fishes, ducks and migratory birds around the area.

== See also ==
- Geography of Taiwan
