= Jiugong Tunnel =

Tunnel in Lieyu, Kinmen, Taiwan

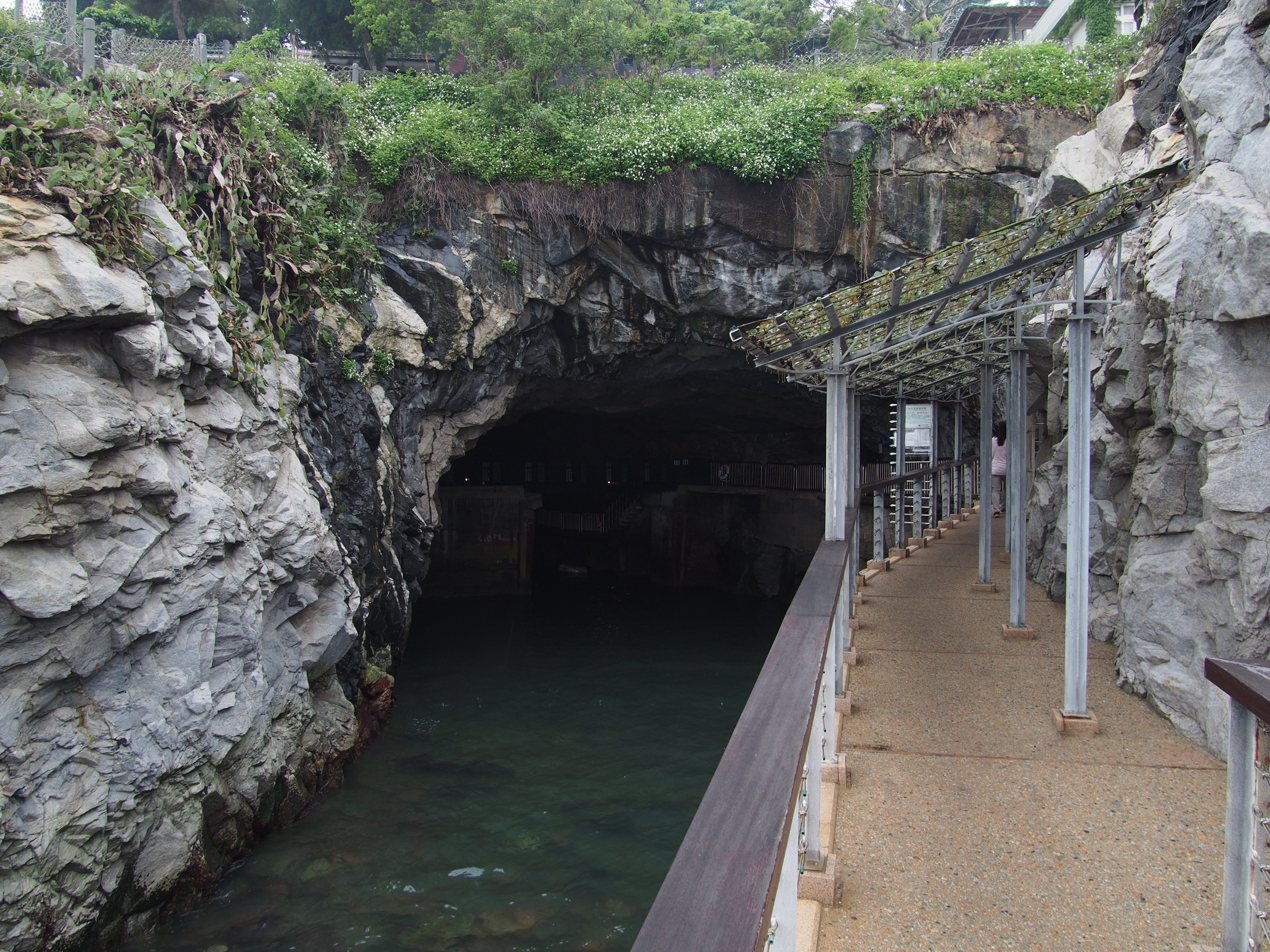
- Interactive map of Jiugong Tunnel

Overview
- Official name: 九宮坑道
- Location: Lieyu, Kinmen, Taiwan
- Coordinates: 24°25′25.1″N 118°15′45.7″E

Technical
- Length: 790 m (2,590 ft)
- Tunnel clearance: 11.5 m (38 ft)

The Jiugong Tunnel (Chinese: 九宮坑道; pinyin: Jiǔgōng Kēngdào) or Siwei Tunnel (Chinese: 四維坑道; pinyin: Sìwéi Kēngdào) is a tunnel in Lieyu Township, Kinmen County, Taiwan. It was used during the 1958 Second Taiwan Strait Crisis, when the island was heavily shelled by People's Republic of China. Supplies and equipment from larger ocean going ships were brought in to shore by smaller vessels. They were unloaded in the tunnel safe from the bombardments.

== Geology ==
The tunnel is located on a coastal area at the southeast of Lieyu Island. It is located in a reef of granite mountain.

== Architecture ==
The tunnel was constructed in a twin T-shape with four exits. It spans over a length of 790 meters and a height of 11.5 meters.

== See also ==
- List of tourist attractions in Taiwan
