= Wong Shek =

Wong Shek, Hong Kong
- 黃石 | 黃麻地
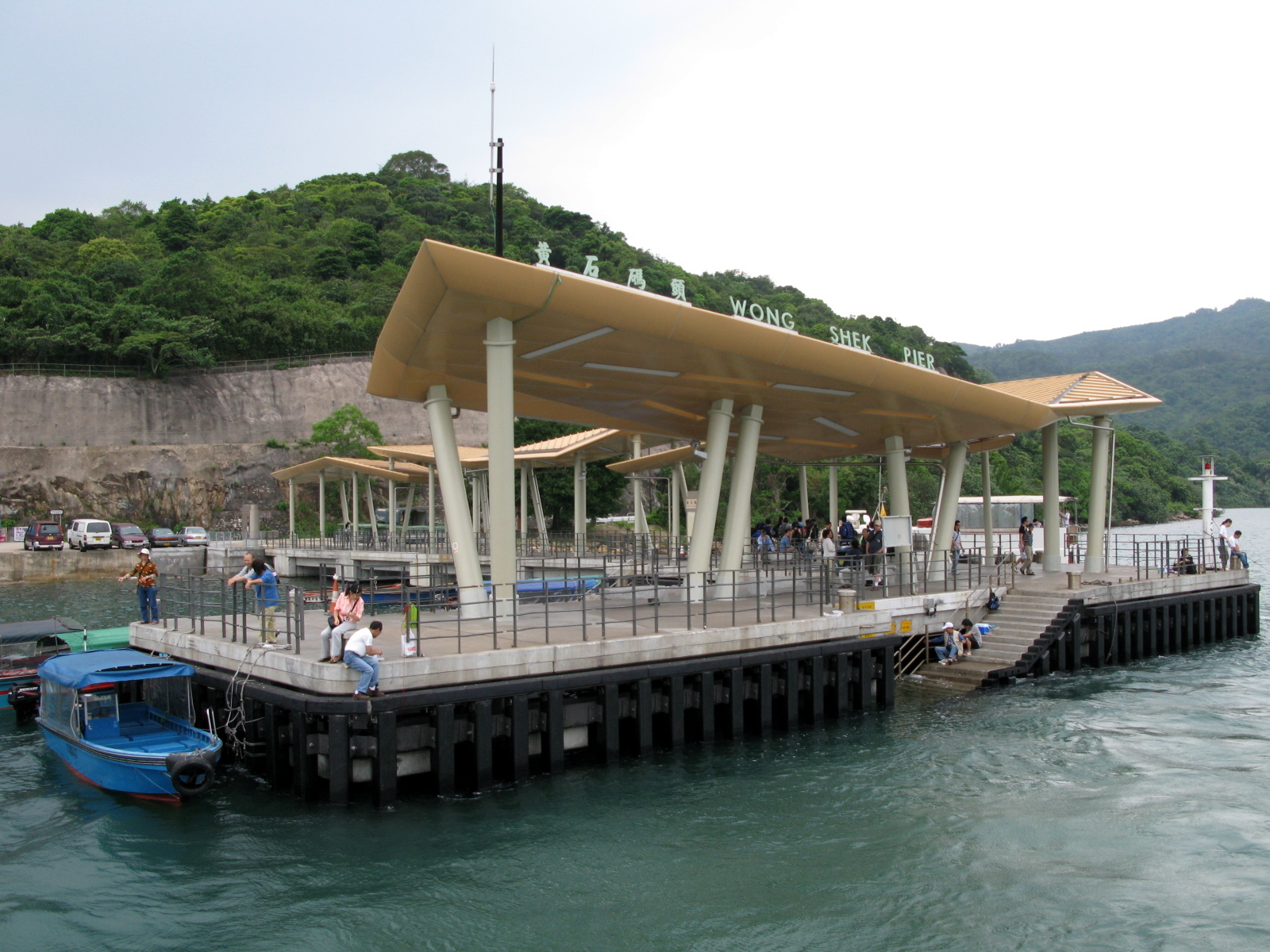
- View of Wong Shek (hill) and Wong Shek Pier

Highest point
- Elevation: 90 m (300 ft)
- Coordinates: 22°25′55.27″N 114°20′6.01″E

Geography
- Location within Hong Kong
- Location: Hong Kong

Wong Shek (Chinese: 黃石), or Wong Ma Tei (黃麻地), is an area in the northern part of the Sai Kung Peninsula in Hong Kong. It is under the administration of Tai Po District. In the area, there are picnic facilities with views of the sea. However, to protect the natural environment of Wong Shek, the Government controls the number of vehicle entering the area; a gate is set up at Pak Tam Chung on the way towards Wong Shek, which only allows permitted vehicles to enter. There is also a public pier called "Wong Shek Pier".

"Wong shek" means "yellow rock" in Cantonese.

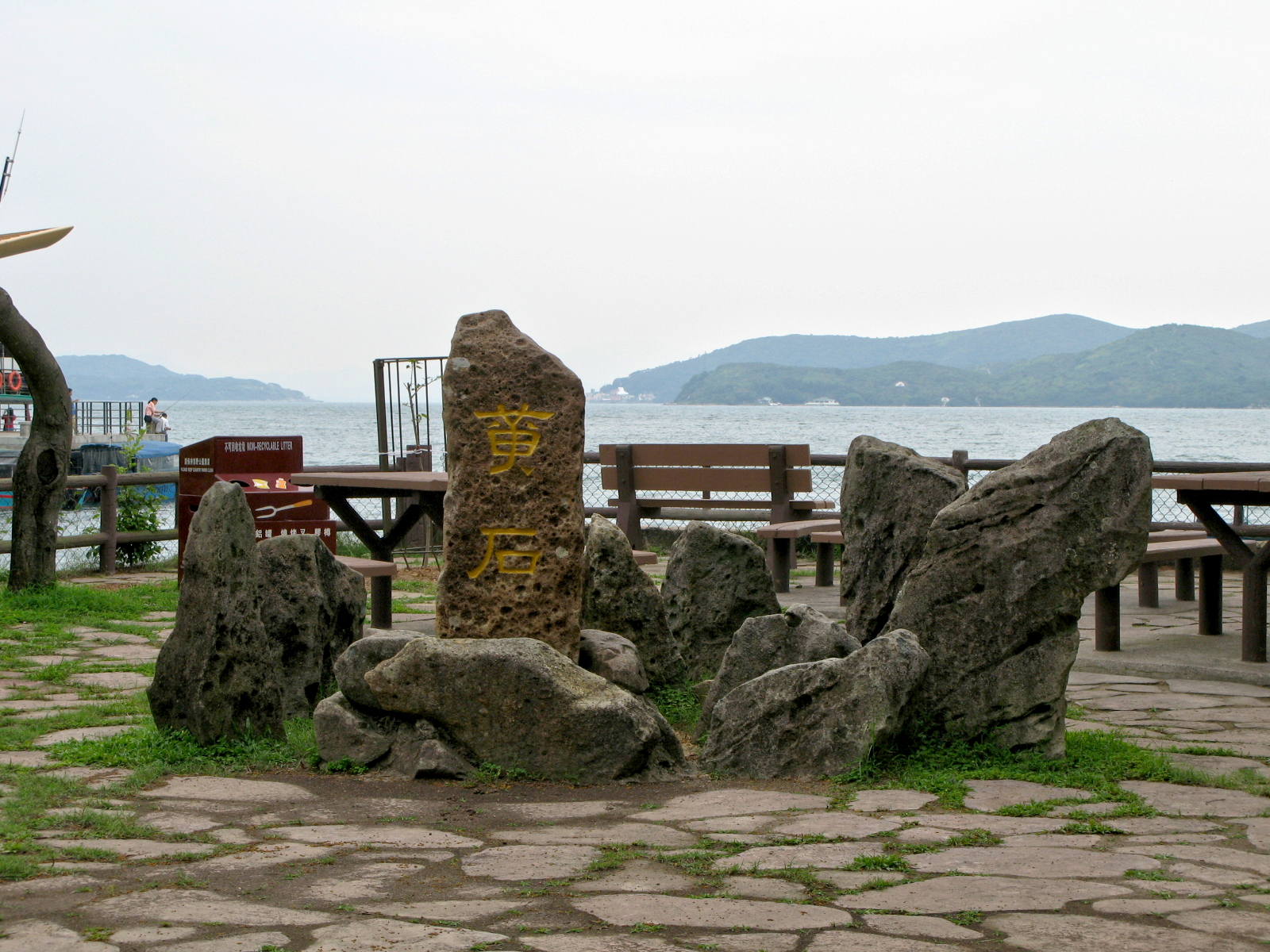
Wong Shek

== Transportation ==
The most common way to reach Wong Shek is by bus. There are several bus routes that go to the Wong Shek Pier.

=== Kowloon Motor Bus ===
- Route 94 - from Sai Kung Bus Terminus
- Route 96R - from Diamond Hill station (Sundays & Public Holidays only)
- Route 289R - from Wong Shek Pier (One-way only to Shatin; Sundays & Public Holidays 3-7pm)

Wong Shek Kai-to (ferry)

=== Kai-to ===
- Ma Liu Shui - Tap Mun (via Wong Shek)
- Wong Shek - Tap Mun
- Wong Shek - Wan Tsai / Chek Keng

== See also ==
- Sai Kung Town
- Sai Kung Peninsula
- Sai Kung Country Park
- Tap Mun
