= Sheung Yiu Folk Museum =

Village and folk museum in Hong Kong

- 上窰民俗文物館
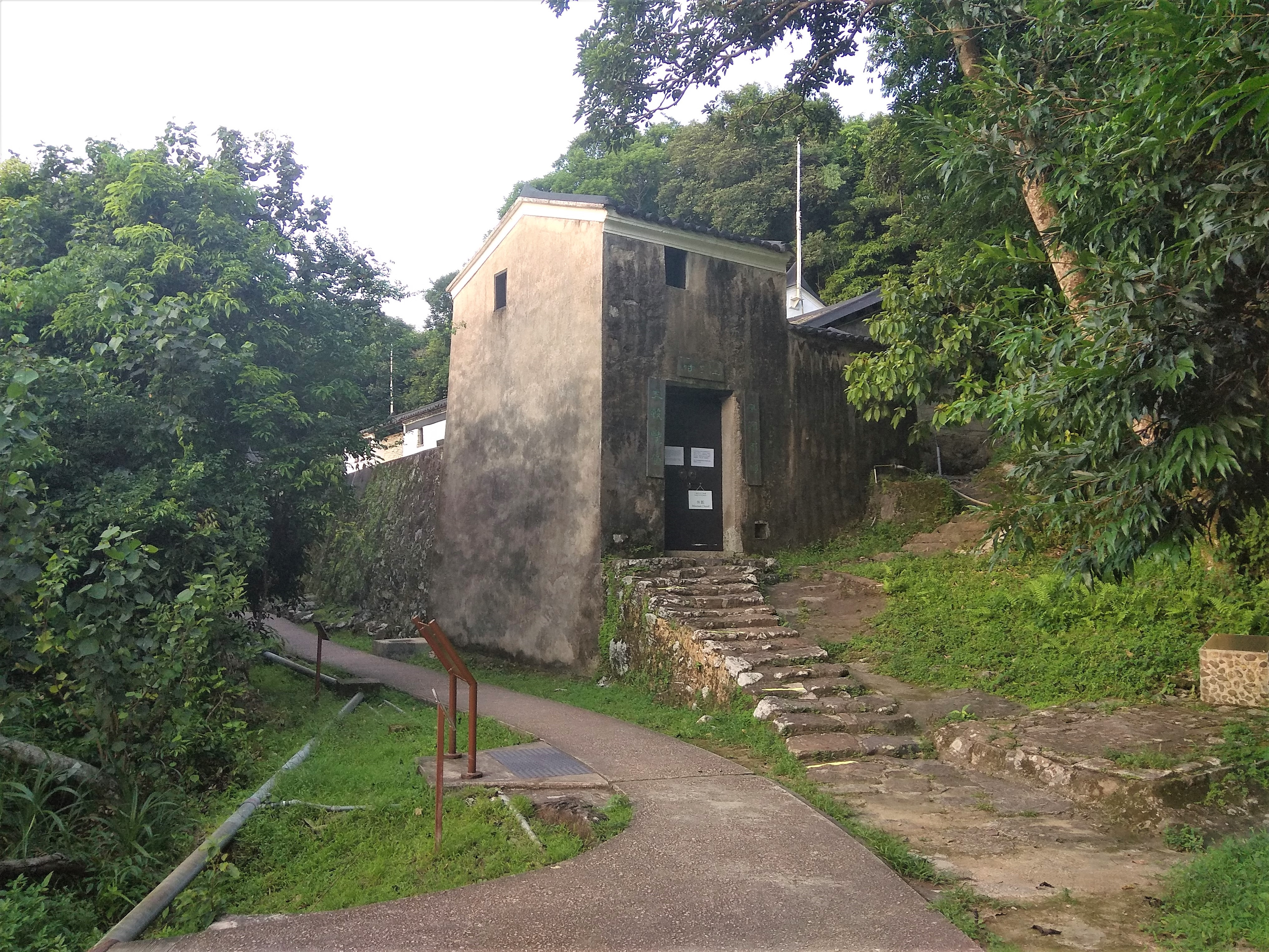
- Entrance to the museum
- Established: 1984; 42 years ago
- Location: Pak Tam Chung Nature Trail, Sai Kung, Hong Kong
- Coordinates: 22°23′N 114°19′E
- Type: Folk museum
- Curator: Irene Chan Yuk-lin
- Owner: Leisure and Cultural Services Department
- Website: hk.heritage.museum

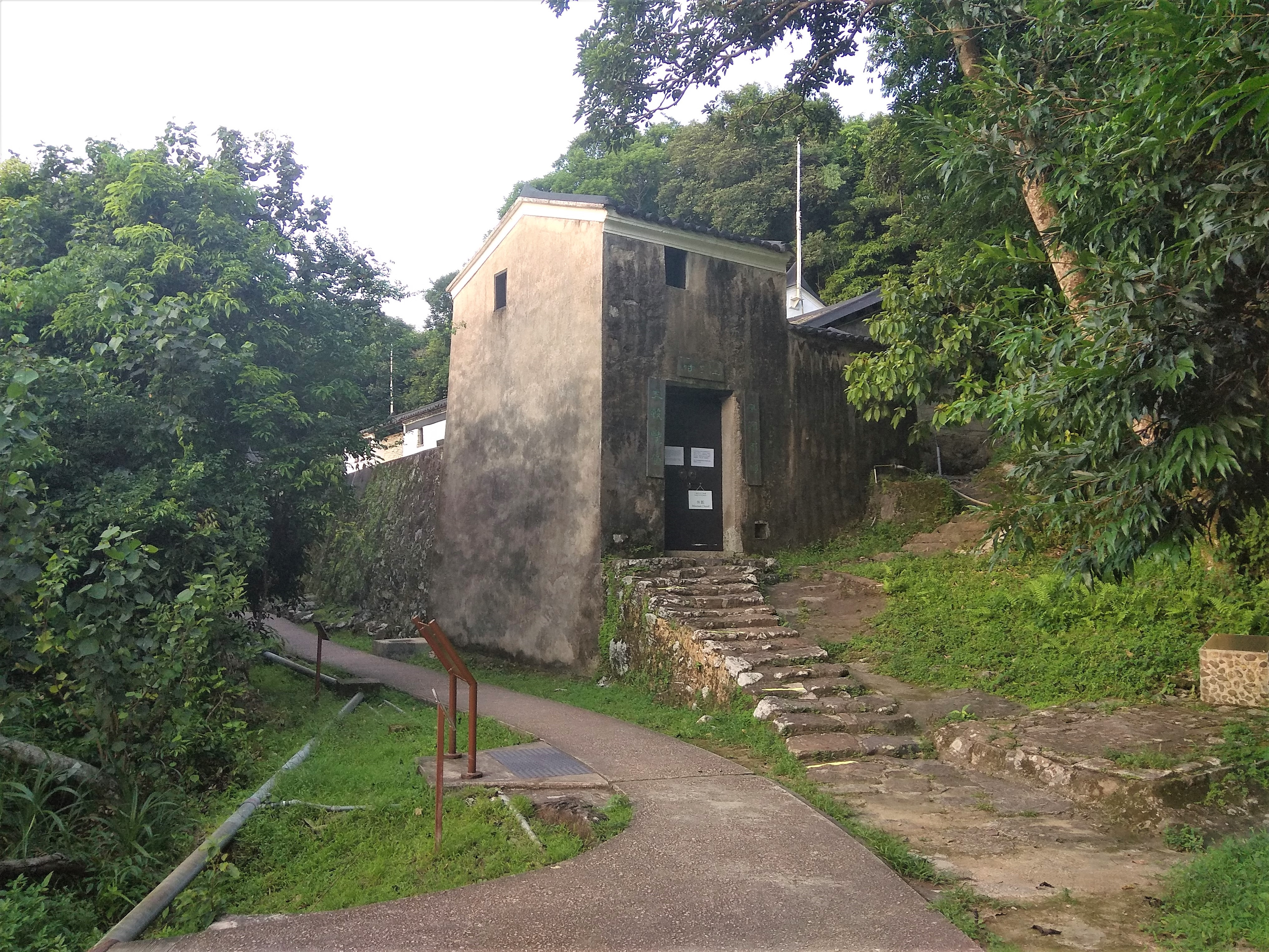
Entrance of the Sheung Yiu Folk Museum.

Sheung Yiu Folk Museum
- Traditional Chinese: 上窰民俗文物館
Transcriptions
Yue: Cantonese
- Yale Romanization: Seuhng yìuh màhn juhk màhn maht gún
- Jyutping: Soei6 jiu4 man4 zuk6 man4 mat6 gun2

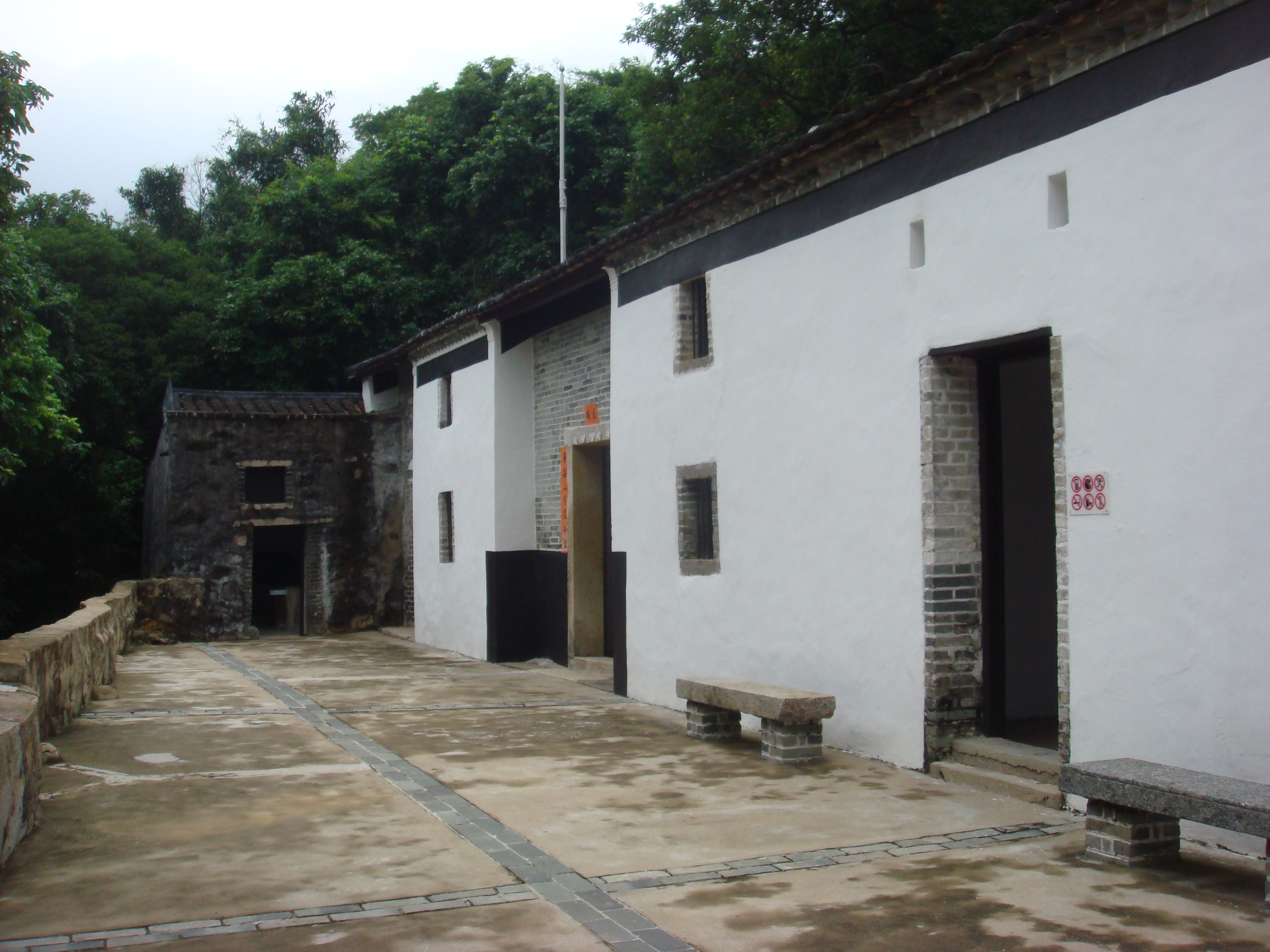
Courtyard of the Sheung Yiu Folk Museum

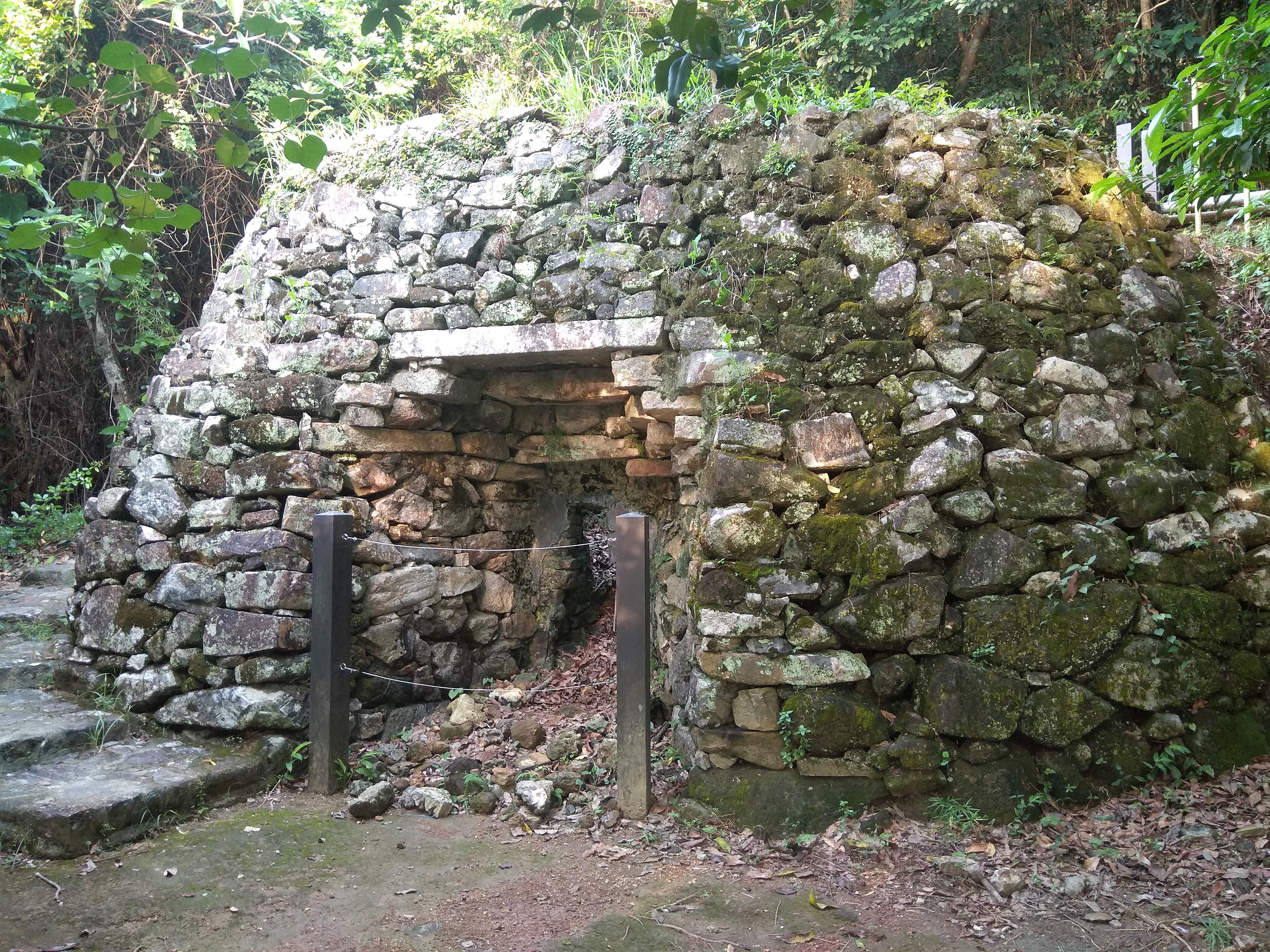
Front view of the lime kiln

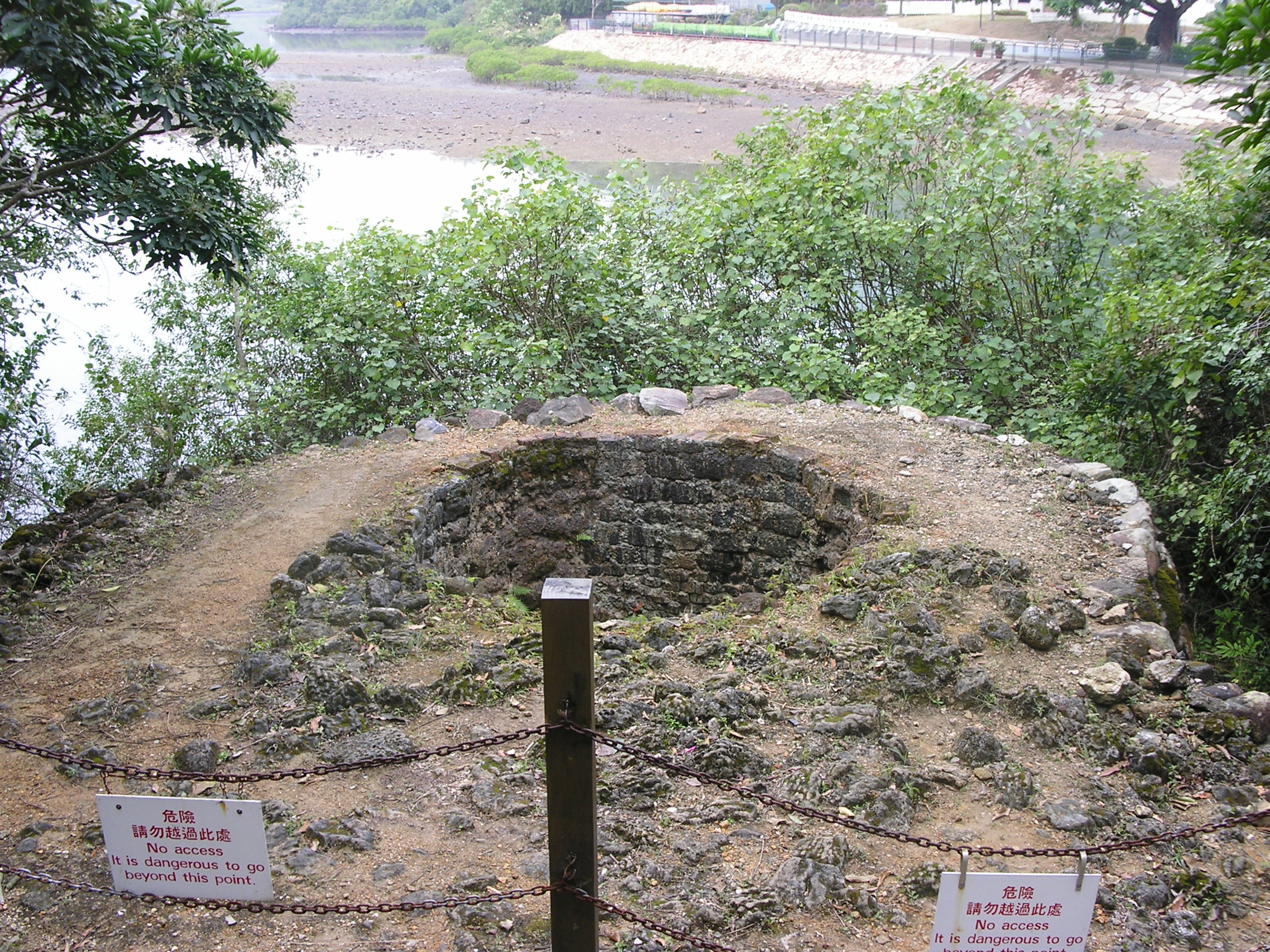
View of the lime kiln from Pak Tam Chung Nature Trail. An arm of Tsam Chuk Wan is visible in the background.

Sheung Yiu Folk Museum is housed in Sheung Yiu Village (Chinese: 上窰村), a declared monument of Hong Kong, on the Pak Tam Chung Nature Trail, Sai Kung District. Sheung Yiu means "above the kiln" in Chinese. It is one of two branch museums of the Hong Kong Heritage Museum, the other being the Hong Kong Railway Museum.

== History ==
Sheung Yiu Village (上窰; Hong Kong Hakka pronunciation: [sɔŋ˥˧ jau˩]) is a Hakka village situated inside the Sai Kung Country Park. It was built by a Hakka family with the surname of Wong in the late 19th century, approximately 150 years ago. The village became prosperous due to its lime kiln whose produce was much sought after for use in mortar and fertilizer, as well as lime bricks and tiles for building houses.

It began to decline in prosperity when modern bricks and cement came into use. In the 1950s, the villagers' men moved away to the urban areas or went overseas to earn a living, leaving some of the aged and children to reside in this property. Eventually the whole village was totally abandoned in September 1968.

After the full restoration of the village in 1983, the village was opened as Sheung Yiu Folk Museum in 1984.

Pak Tam Chung was described as consisting of six villages in 1911 with fewer than 405 inhabitants: Wong Yi Chau (黃宜洲), Pak Tam (北潭), Sheung Yiu, Tsak Yue Wu (鯽魚湖), Wong Keng Tei (黃麖地) and Tsam Chuk Wan. The six villages were all inhabited by Hakka people, with the exception of two hamlets in Pak Tam.

== Administration ==
Pak Tam Chung (Sheung Yiu) is a recognized village under the New Territories Small House Policy.

== Museum ==
The row of the eight houses constructed on a raised platform with a watch tower at its entrance are preserved and opened to the public. In its 9 galleries, the museum displays various farming implements, village period furniture and other daily objects used by the Hakka people so that the atmosphere and environment of a small Hakka village is recreated.

The lime kiln, where coral and shells were baked to form lime, had been restored for public viewing.

The museum is open daily from 10 am to 6 pm (5 pm between October and February), except Tuesdays and the first two days of the Chinese New Year. Entrance to the museum is free. The restored building contains a number of typical Hakka utensils and farming tools, and also some displays on the history of the inhabitants.
