= Tai Po Tsai (Sai Kung Peninsula) =

Village in Hong Kong

Coordinates: 22.395879°N 114.297805°E

Tai Po Tsai (Chinese: 西貢大埗仔) is a village on Sai Kung Peninsula, in Sai Kung District, Hong Kong.

== Administration ==
Tai Po Tsai is a recognized village under the New Territories Small House Policy.
