= Wong Keng Tei =

Village in Hong Kong

Coordinates: 22.393908°N 114.317787°E

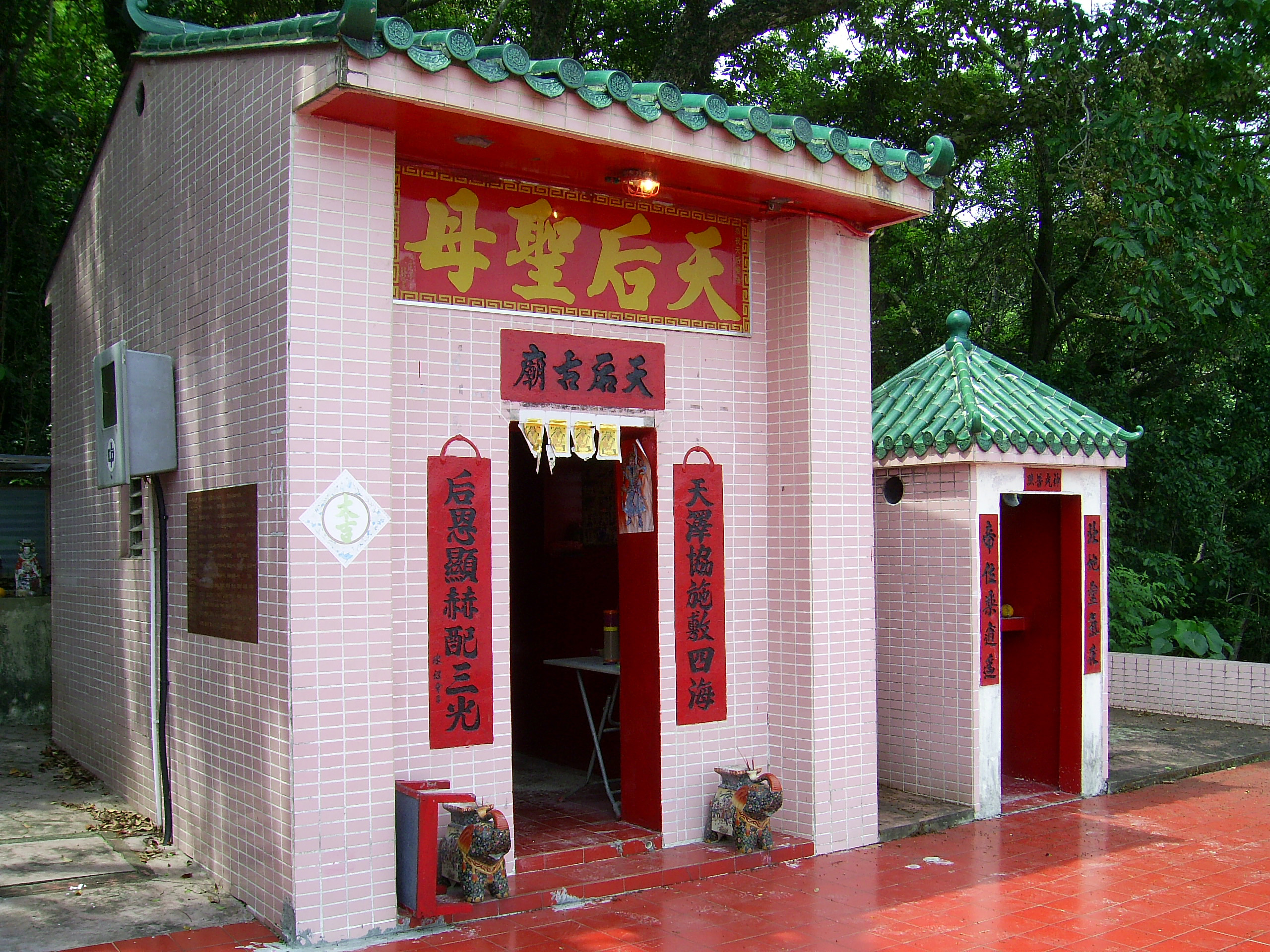
Tin Hau Temple in Wong Keng Tei in June 2009.

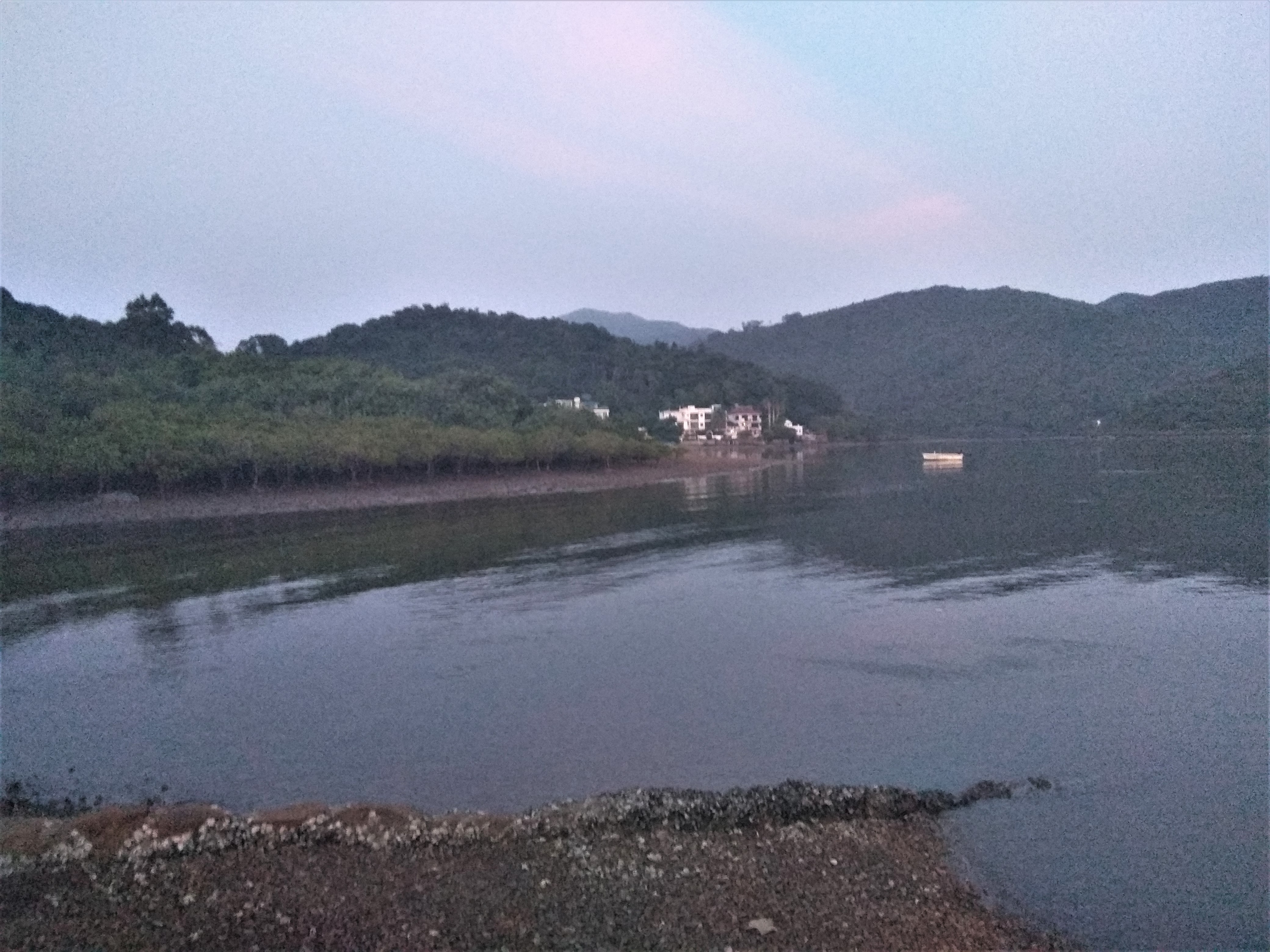
View of Wong Keng Tei along Tsam Chuk Wan.

Wong Keng Tei (Chinese: 黃麖地) is a village in Tsam Chuk Wan, Sai Kung Peninsula, Hong Kong.

== Administration ==
Wong Keng Tei is a recognized village under the New Territories Small House Policy.

== History ==
Pak Tam Chung was described as consisting of six villages in 1911 with fewer than 405 inhabitants: Wong Yi Chau (黃宜洲), Pak Tam (北潭), Sheung Yiu (上窰), Tsak Yue Wu (鯽魚湖), Wong Keng Tei and Tsam Chuk Wan. The six villages were all inhabited by Hakka people, with the exception of two hamlets in Pak Tam.
