= Tsak Yue Wu =

Village in Hong Kong

Coordinates: 22.401278°N 114.32335°E

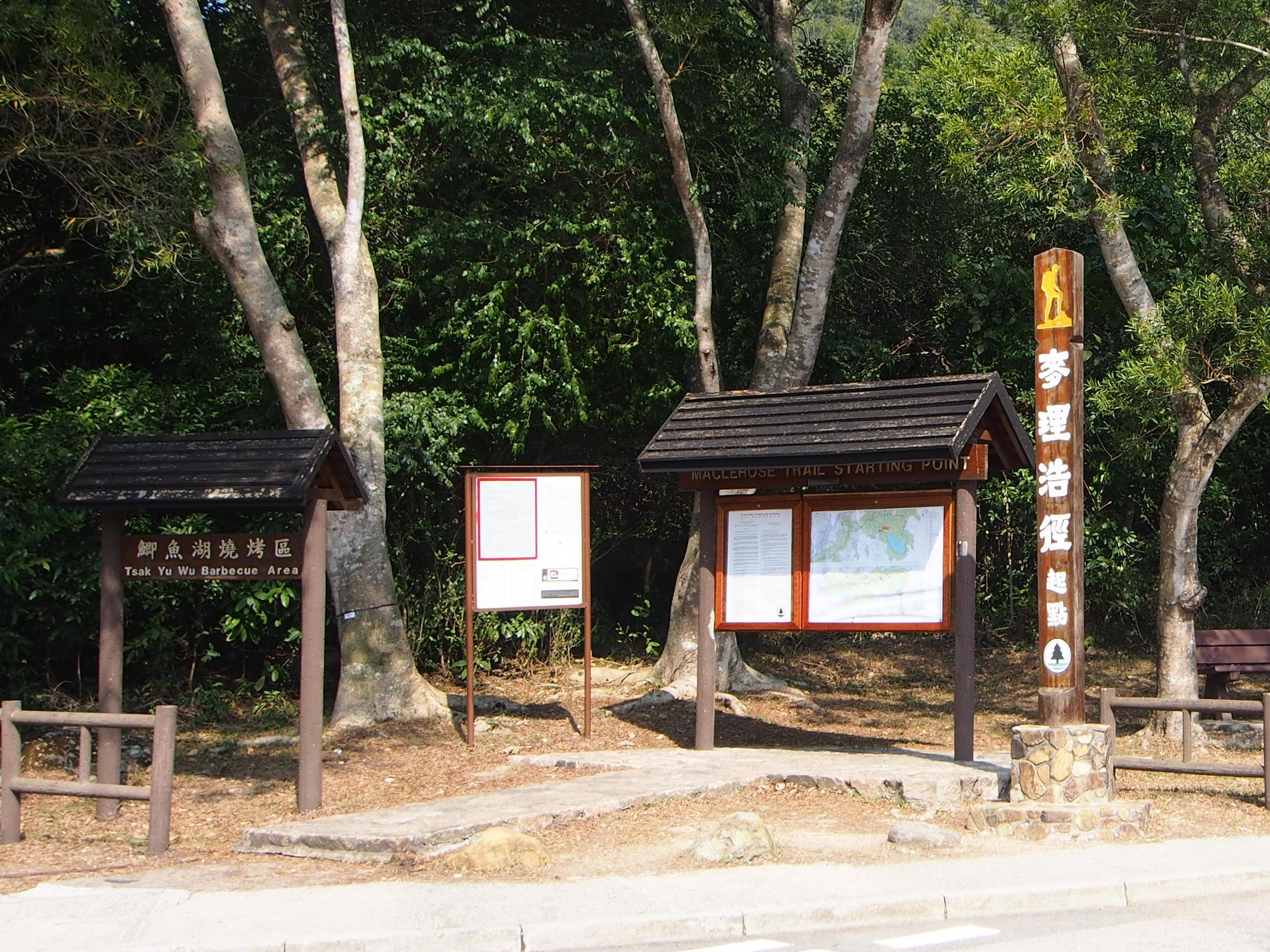
Starting point of the MacLehose Trail at Tsak Yue Wu.

Tsak Yue Wu (Chinese: 鯽魚湖), also transliterated as Chik Yu Wu and Tsik U Wu, is a village in Pak Tam Chung, Sai Kung Peninsula, Hong Kong.

== Administration ==
Tsak Yue Wu is a recognized village under the New Territories Small House Policy.

== History ==
Pak Tam Chung was described as consisting of six villages in 1911 with fewer than 405 inhabitants: Wong Yi Chau (黃宜洲), Pak Tam (北潭), Sheung Yiu (上窰), Tsak Yue Wu, Wong Keng Tei (黃麖地) and Tsam Chuk Wan. The six villages were all inhabited by Hakka people, with the exception of two hamlets in Pak Tam.
