= Wong Yi Chau =

Village in Hong Kong

Coordinates: 22.388828°N 114.318377°E

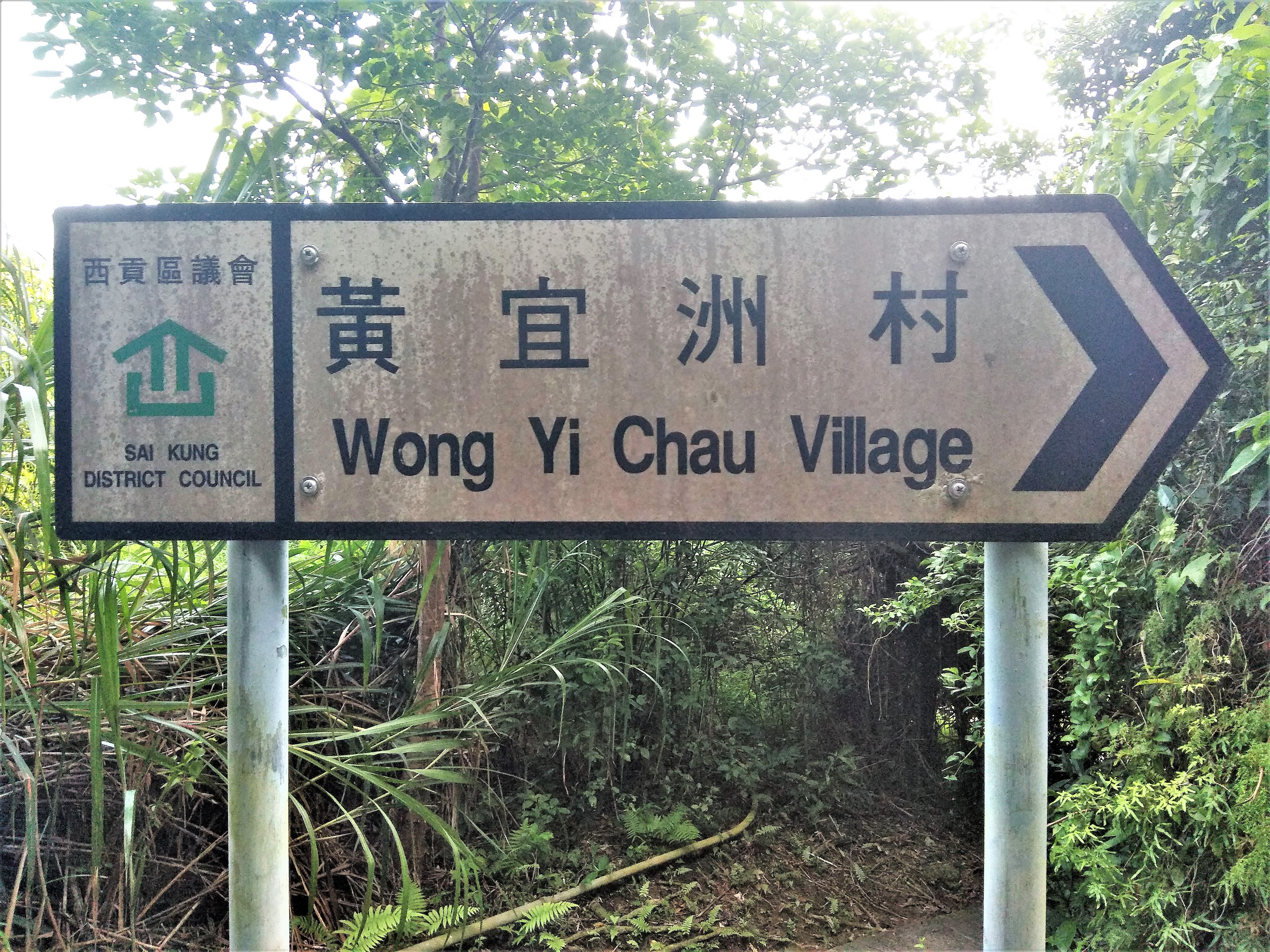
Sign to Wong Yi Chau.

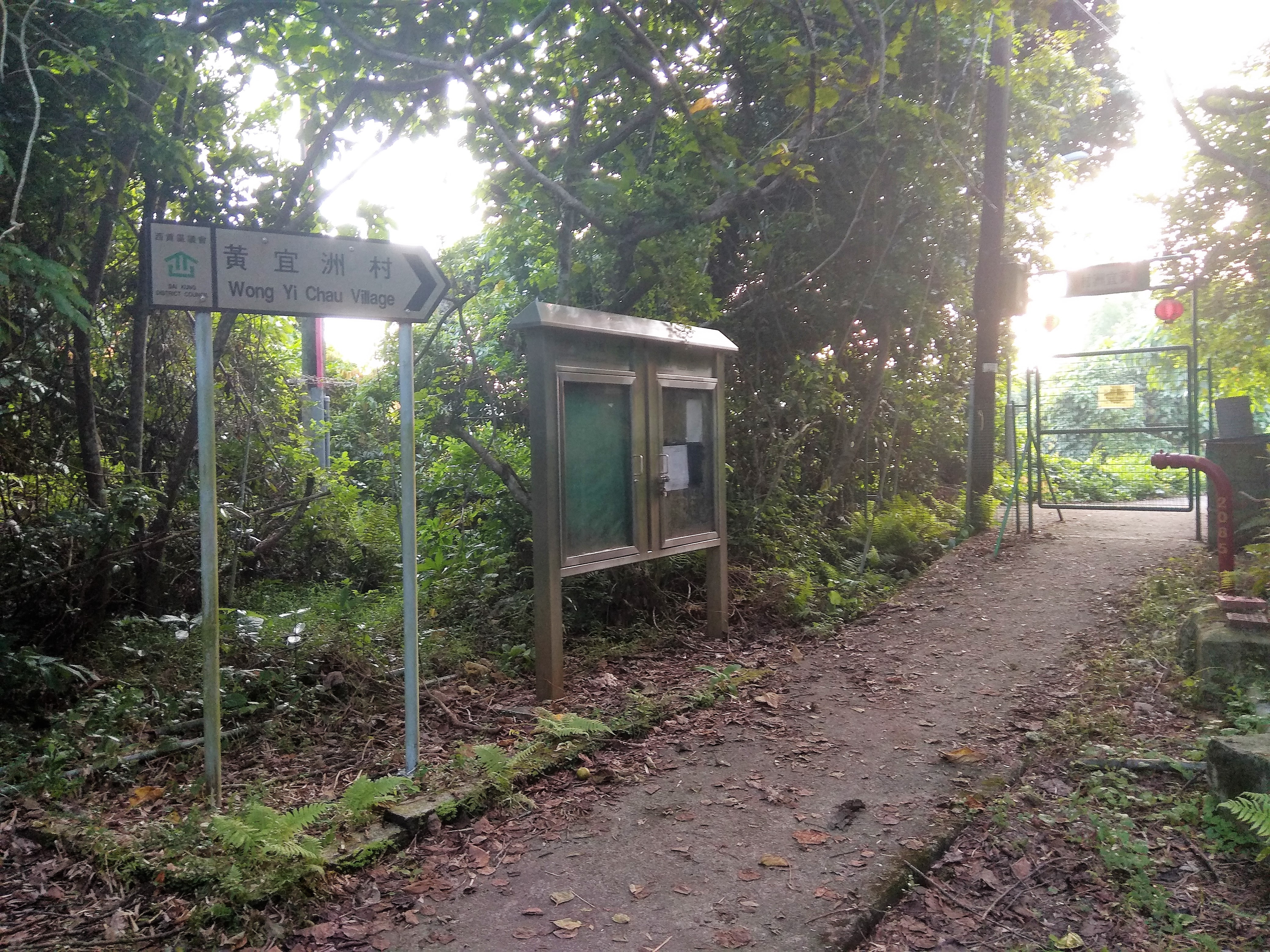
Notice board in Wong Yi Chau.

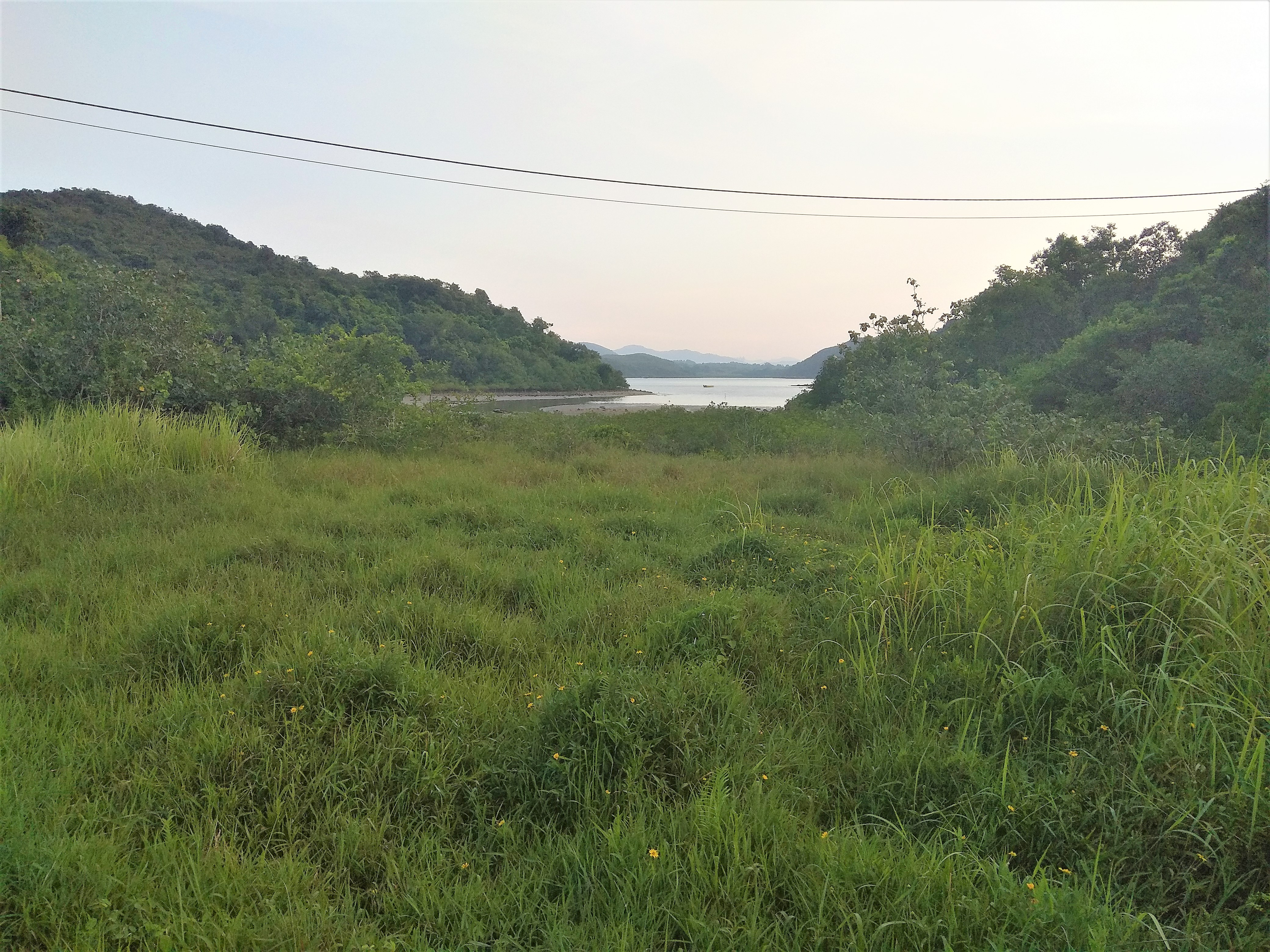
Landscape near Hei Tsz Wan (起子灣), a former village situated across a little bay from Wong Yi Chau.

Wong Yi Chau (Chinese: 黃宜洲) is a village in Tsam Chuk Wan, Sai Kung Peninsula, Hong Kong.

== Administration ==
Wong Yi Chau is a recognized village under the New Territories Small House Policy.

== History ==
Pak Tam Chung was described as consisting of six villages in 1911 with fewer than 405 inhabitants: Wong Yi Chau, Pak Tam (北潭), Sheung Yiu (上窰), Tsak Yue Wu (鯽魚湖), Wong Keng Tei (黃麖地) and Tsam Chuk Wan. The six villages were all inhabited by Hakka people, with the exception of two hamlets in Pak Tam.
