= Pak Tam =

Village in the New Territories in Hong Kong

Coordinates: 22.409726°N 114.317605°E

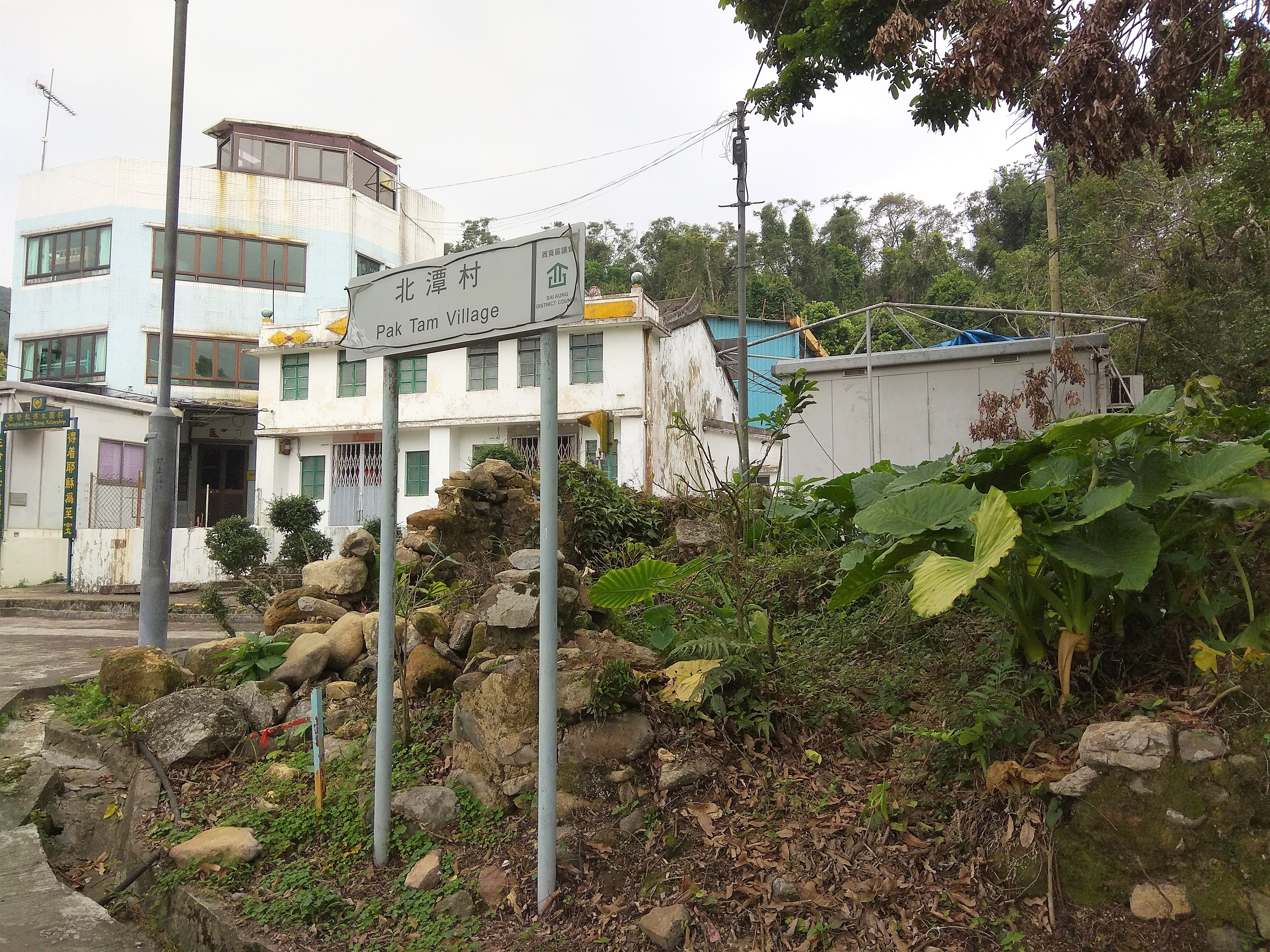
Pak Tam Village.

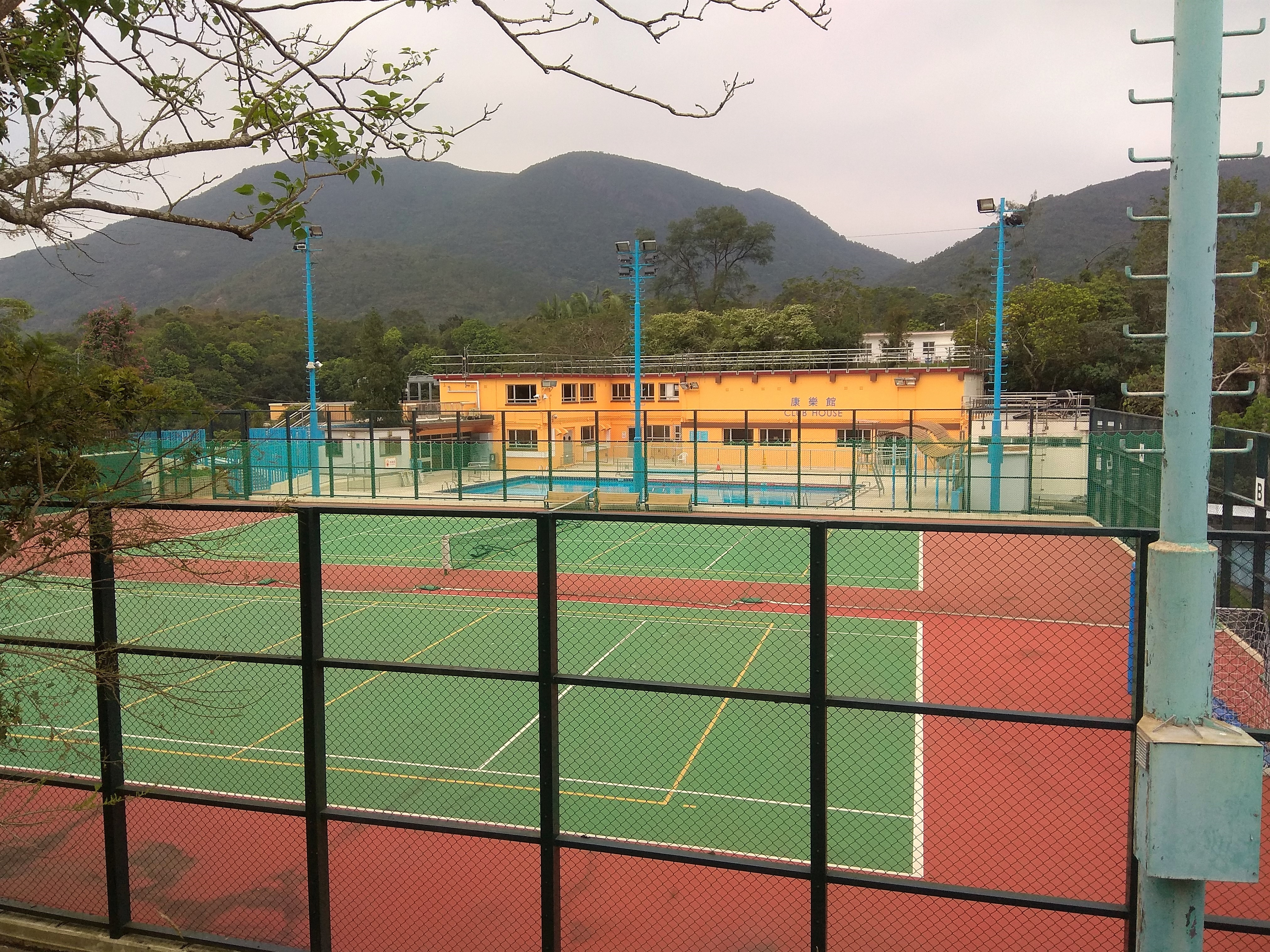
Lady MacLehose Holiday Village (麥理浩夫人度假村) in Pak Tam.

Pak Tam (Chinese: 北潭) is a village in Pak Tam Chung, Sai Kung Peninsula, Hong Kong.

== Administration ==
Pak Tam is a recognized village under the New Territories Small House Policy.

== History ==
Pak Tam Chung was described as consisting of six villages in 1911 with fewer than 405 inhabitants: Wong Yi Chau (黃宜洲), Pak Tam, Sheung Yiu (上窰), Tsak Yue Wu (鯽魚湖), Wong Keng Tei (黃麖地) and Tsam Chuk Wan. The six villages were all inhabited by Hakka people, with the exception of two hamlets in Pak Tam.
