= Tsam Chuk Wan =

Bay of the Sai Kung Peninsula in Hong Kong

Coordinates: 22.387936°N 114.312916°E

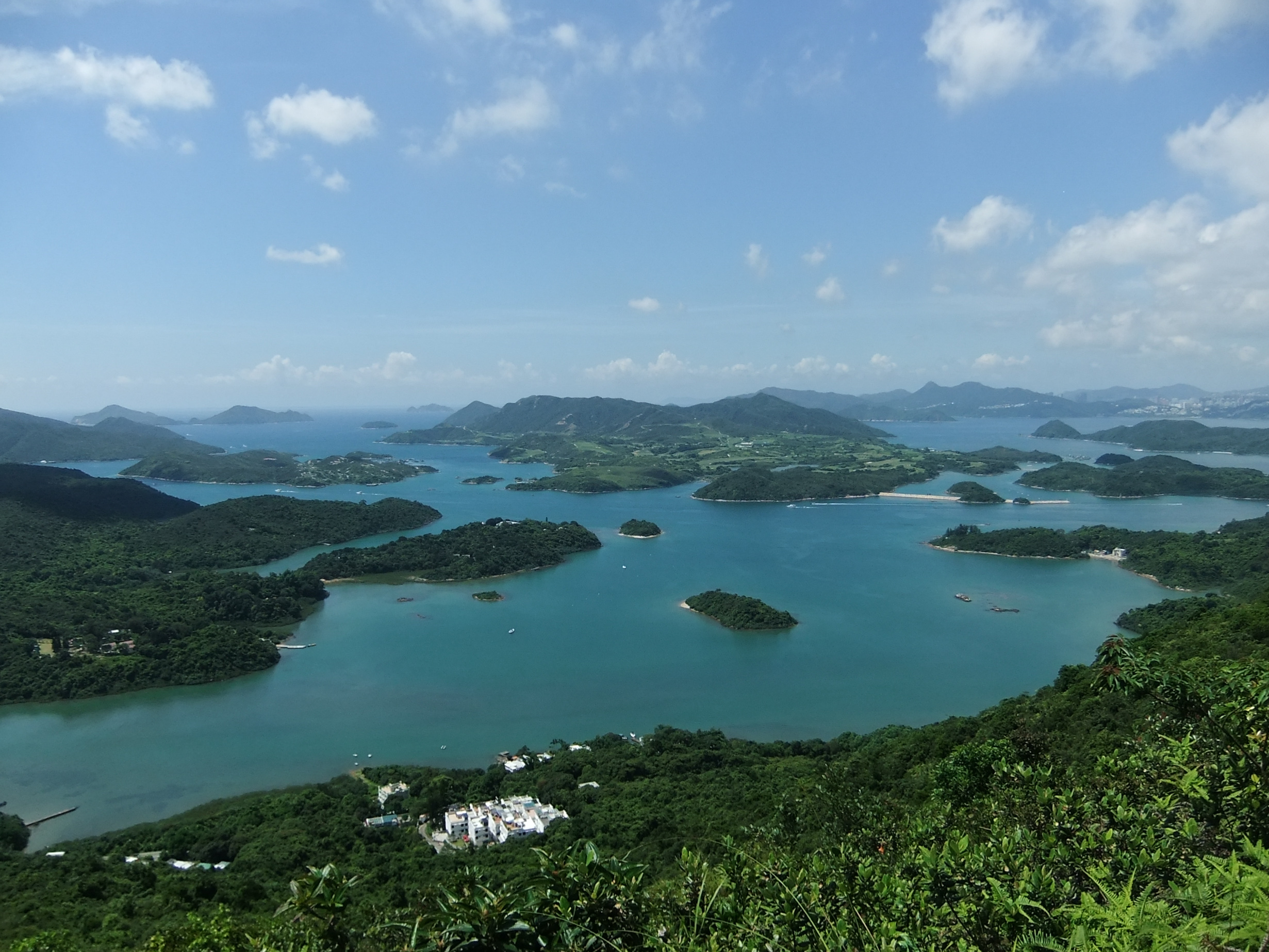
View of Tsam Chuk Wan from Tai Tun (太墩).

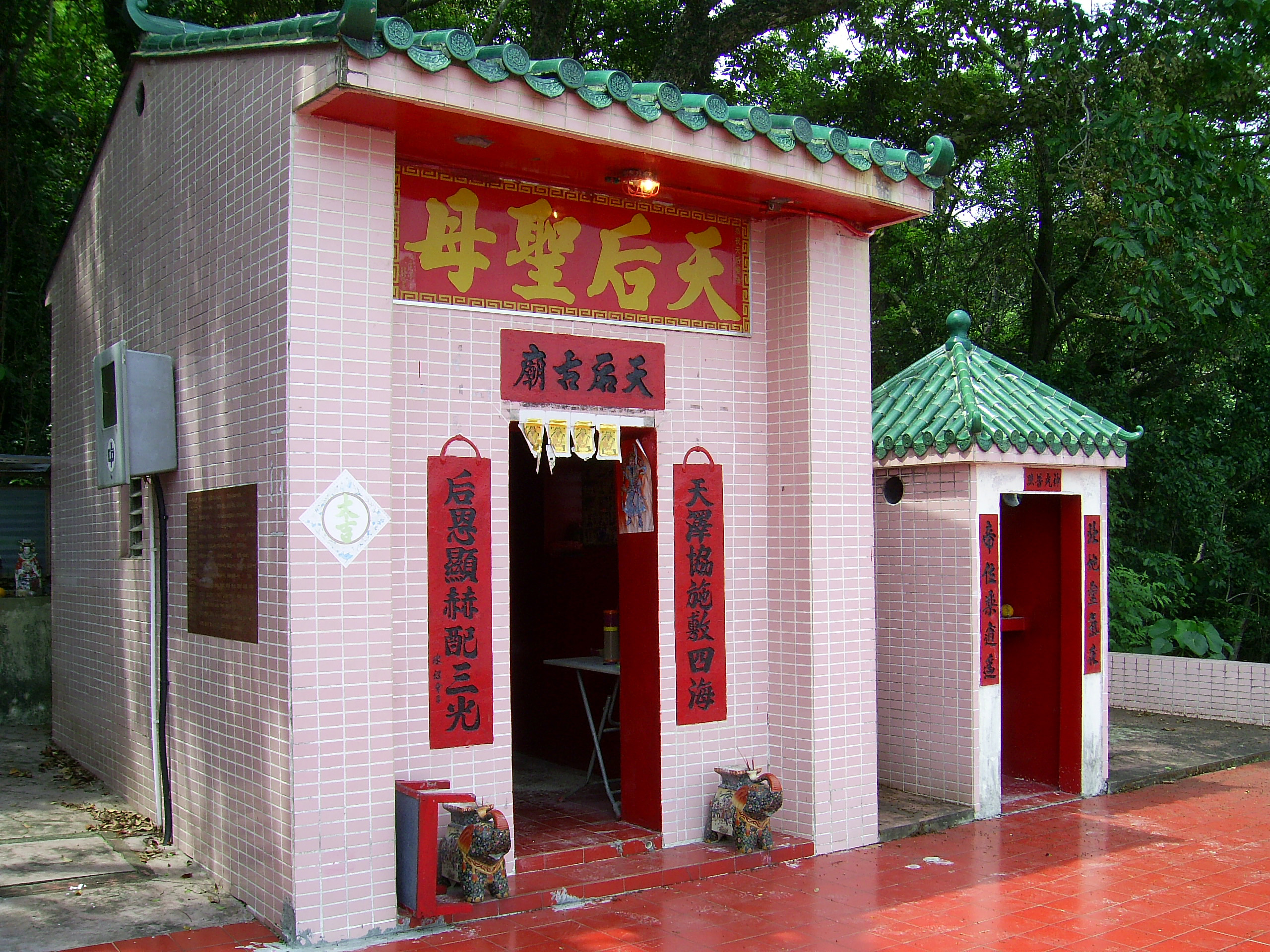
Tin Hau Temple, off Tai Mong Tsai Road.

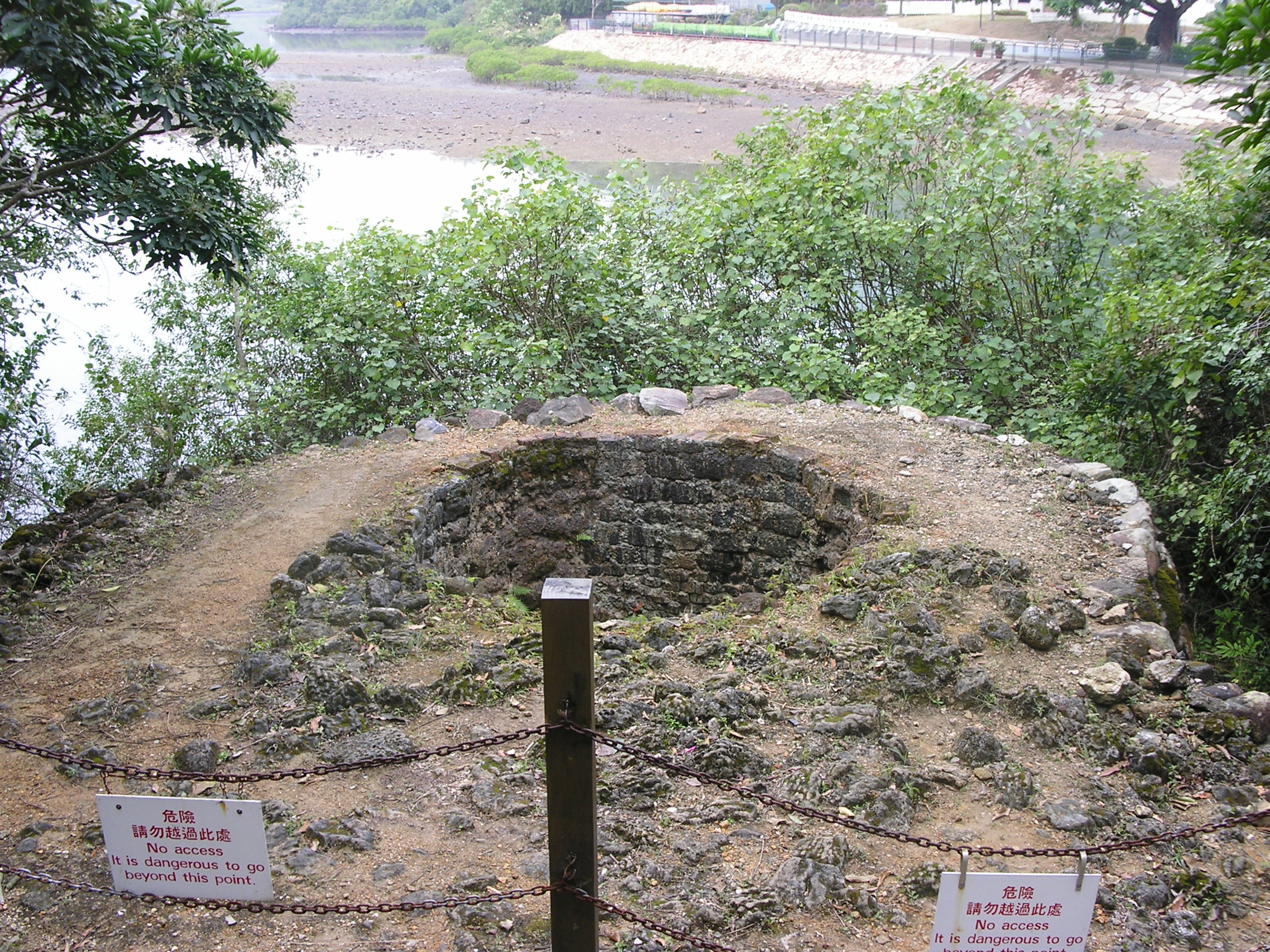
Lime kiln next to Sheung Yiu Folk Museum, overlooking an arm of Tsam Chuk Wan.

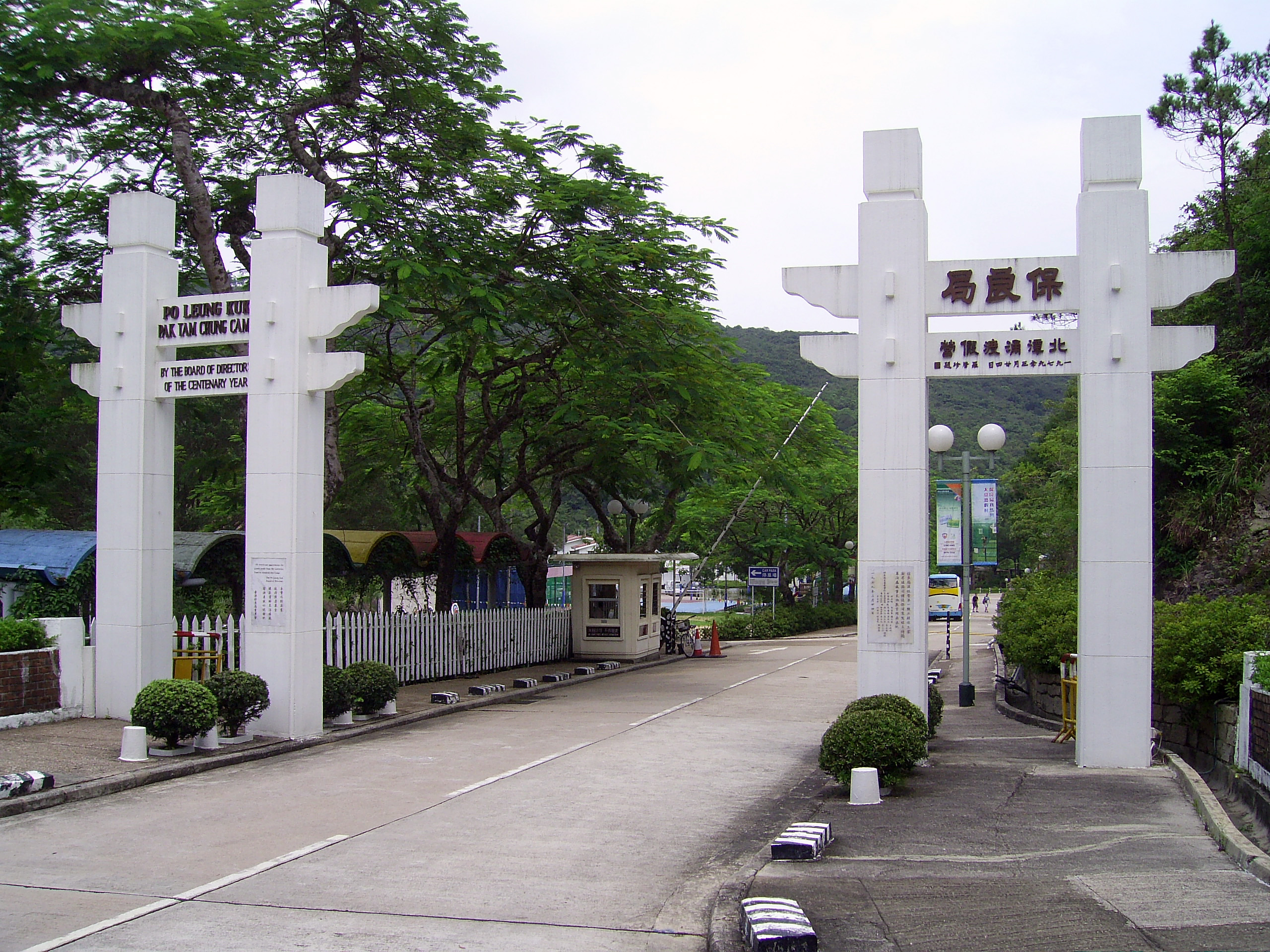
Entrance of Po Leung Kuk Pak Tam Chung Camp along Tai Mong Tsai Road.

Tsam Chuk Wan (Chinese: 斬竹灣) is a bay of the Sai Kung Peninsula in Hong Kong. By extension, it is also the name of the area around the bay. Tsam Chuk Wan Village (斬竹灣村) is one of the villages located within this area.

== History ==
A Catholic missionary station was established at Tsam Chuk Wan between 1867 and 1869.

In 1911, Pak Tam Chung consisted of six villages with fewer than 405 inhabitants in total: Wong Yi Chau (黃宜洲), Pak Tam (北潭), Sheung Yiu (上窰), Tsak Yue Wu (鯽魚湖), Wong Keng Tei (黃麖地) and Tsam Chuk Wan. The six villages were all inhabited by Hakka people, with the exception of two hamlets in Pak Tam.

The population of Tsam Chuk Wan Village (斬竹灣村) was 74 in 1911. In the 1950s, it was about 55, as recorded by Austin Coates and James W. Hayes.

== Islands ==
Islands of Tsam Chuk Wan include:

- Muk Yue Chau (木魚洲)
- Ching Chau (青洲)
- Nga Ying Chau (牙鷹洲)
- Wong Nai Chau Tsai (黄泥洲仔)
- Wong Yi Chau (黄宜洲)

== Features ==
Features around the bay include (from West to East):

- Memorial Monument of Sai Kung Martyrs of World War II (西貢烈士墓園). Unveiled on January 23, 1989.
- Hong Kong Sea Cadet Corps Tang Shiu Kin Nautical Centre (香港海事青年團鄧肇堅海事康樂中心)
- Queen Elizabeth School Camp (伊利沙伯中學校營)
- Tsam Chuk Wan Village (斬竹灣村), a recognized village under the New Territories Small House Policy.
- Wong Keng Tei Tin Hau Temple (黃麖地天后古廟) aka. Tsam Chuk Wan Tin Hau Temple. Located off Tai Mong Tsai Road (斬竹灣天后廟), and overlooking Tsam Chuk Wan
- Wong Keng Tei (黃麖地), a village
- Po Leung Kuk Pak Tam Chung Camp (保良局北潭涌渡假營)
- Sheung Yiu Folk Museum, housed in Sheung Yiu (上窰) Village, a declared monument of Hong Kong
- Our Lady of the Seven Sorrows Chapel (聖母七苦小堂). Built in 1900, it is one of the historic churches of Sai Kung.
- Wong Yi Chau (黃宜洲), a village
- Hei Tsz Wan (起子灣), a former village situated across a little bay from Wong Yi Chau

== See also ==
- Port Shelter
- List of planning areas in Hong Kong
- Sai Kung East Country Park
- Sai Kung West Country Park
