= Edward Ng =

American mathematician

Edward W Ng (Chinese: 伍煒國; September 23, 1939 – December 14, 2018) was an American applied mathematician who had also held the positions of senior scientist, senior engineer and technical manager in the U.S. Space Program. He is noted for his broad variety of mathematical applications in space science and engineering. He has also contributed conscientiously in the spin-off of technology from the space program, with applications in such diverse subjects as Bose–Einstein distribution in mathematical physics, symbolic and algebraic computation, computational physics and biomedical research.

Ng attended the Queen Elizabeth School, Hong Kong for secondary education, and the University of Minnesota for his bachelor's degree. He received his M.A. and PhD degrees from Columbia University. He was employed at the Jet Propulsion Laboratory (JPL) of the California Institute of Technology, a.k.a. Caltech under contract with the National Aeronautics and Space Administration (NASA). He retired in 2006.

Ng was elected a Fellow of the American Association for the Advancement of Science (AAAS) and is cited in the American Men and Women of Science. He was the editor of "Symbolic and Algebraic Computation" (ISBN 3-540-09519-5), in the Springer Science Lecture Notes Series. He was also a co-editor of the Proceedings of a NATO Advanced Study Institute in applied mathematics (ISBN 978-90-277-1571-5). He has published numerous technical papers of diverse mathematical applications in space sciences and engineering (selected list in external link below). His papers have appeared in Astrophysical Journal, Mathematics of Computation, Celestial Mechanics and Dynamical Astronomy, Journal of Computational Physics, M.I.T. Journal of Mathematics and Physics, ACM Transactions on Mathematical Software and Proceedings of the American Institute of Aeronautics and Astronautics.

== Notable quotes ==
- "In science, one man's noise is another man's signal." cited in New York Times (1990). The context was in space science data and the reference was to the scientific-engineering concept of Signal-to-noise ratio.
- Why Do We Explore Space? an educational paper in Space 2006,
- Nobel Connection to the Space Program, a paper in Space 2007, published by the American Institute of Aeronautics and Astronautics.
- High-precision approximations of Bose–Einstein Functions in the Mathematics of Computation published by the American Mathematical Society.
- Information Systems for Space Astrophysics*

== Awards ==
Ng has received a number of NASA Awards (cf attached citations), including the special NASA Certificate of Apollo-Columbia Commemoration of the Space Transportation System–65 Flight in 1994. He also was the recipient of the American Astronomical Society Team Appreciation Award on the Deep Space Network.

== Professional affiliations ==
- American Association for the Advancement of Science (Fellow)
- American Institute of Aeronautics and Astronautics (AIAA)
- Society for Industrial and Applied Mathematics

== Honorary societies ==
- Phi Beta Kappa, Minnesota Alpha Chapter
- Sigma Xi, California Institute of Technology Chapter
