= Fuk Li =

NASA official

Fuk Li

Fuk K. Li (李復國; /fuːk/ FOOK) is the Director of the Mars Exploration Directorate at NASA's Jet Propulsion Laboratory.

Li's directorate is responsible for JPL's projects exploring Mars, including two orbiters (Mars Odyssey and Mars Reconnaissance Orbiter), two famous rovers (Spirit and Opportunity), the Phoenix stationary laboratory which landed near the north pole of Mars in 2008, and the Mars Science Laboratory Curiosity rover that was sent to the red planet in 2011 and landed there in 2012.

== Biography ==
Li was born in Hong Kong in 1953, and received his secondary school education in Queen Elizabeth School, Hong Kong.

He received his bachelor's (1975) and Ph.D. (1979) degrees in physics from the Massachusetts Institute of Technology. He joined JPL in 1979 and has been involved in radar remote sensing activities. He has developed a number of system analysis tools for spaceborne synthetic aperture radar system design, and participated in the development of and applications for interferometric synthetic aperture radar. From 1983 to 1988, he was the project engineer for the NASA Scatterometer. He was principal investigator for an airborne rain mapping radar, an airborne cloud mapping radar, an experiment using spaceborne imaging radar to study rainfall effects on ocean roughness, and the development of an airborne active/passive microwave system for ocean salinity and soil moisture sensing. From 1997 to 2001 he managed the New Millennium Program, designed to flight-validate key technologies that bring significant benefits to future science missions. He became deputy director of JPL's Solar System Exploration Program Directorate in 2001, and deputy director for the Mars Exploration Directorate in 2004, and director for the Mars Exploration Directorate in 2005. He is currently also the NASA Mars Exploration Program Manager.

In 2007, Li received the NASA Outstanding Leadership Medal and in 2008, the NASA Distinguished Service Medal.
