= Queen Elizabeth School, Hong Kong =

Government secondary school in Hong Kong

Coordinates: 22.3240°N 114.1713°E

Queen Elizabeth School Chinese: 伊利沙伯中學
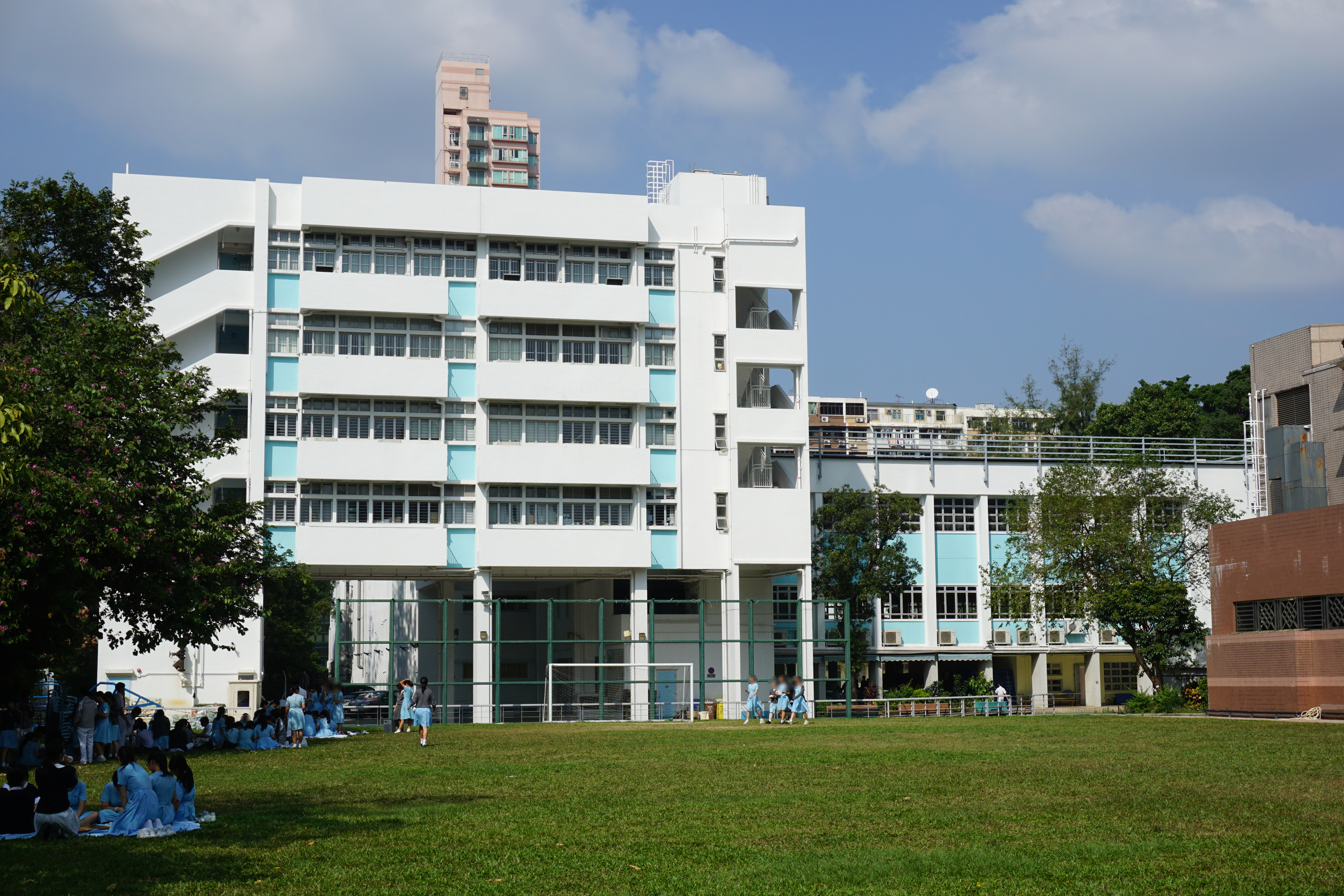
- 152 Sai Yee Street, Mong Kok, Kowloon; Hong Kong, China

Information
- School type: Government school, Secondary school
- Motto: Latin: Vos Parate Ut Serviatis (Prepare yourselves that you may serve)
- Established: September 1954; 71 years ago
- School district: Yau Tsim Mong District
- Supervisor: Brian Cheng Kwok-yan
- Principal: Eric Chan Cheung-wai
- Teaching staff: 53
- Grades: Secondary 1 to 6
- Gender: Co-educational
- Enrollment: about 860
- Area: 14,000 m^{2} (150,000 sq ft)
- Website: http://www.qes.edu.hk

Queen Elizabeth School, Hong Kong
- Traditional Chinese: 伊利沙伯中學
- Simplified Chinese: 伊利沙伯中学
Transcriptions
Standard Mandarin
- Hanyu Pinyin: Yīlìshābó Zhōngxué
Yue: Cantonese
- Jyutping: ji1 lei6 saa1 baak3 zung1 hok6

Queen Elizabeth School (Chinese: 伊利沙伯中學), or QES and QE (伊中 or 伊利沙伯) for short, is a secondary school in Hong Kong. The school was the first English as a Medium of Instruction (EMI) (Anglo-Chinese) co-educational secondary school founded by the Government of Hong Kong. It is located on a mound at the boundary of Sai Yee Street and Prince Edward Road West in Mong Kok, Kowloon.

The school was conceived in 1953 when Queen Elizabeth II was crowned. Later it was run in September 1954 but operated as an after school on the premises of King's College, until October 1955 when it moved to the present location in Mong Kok.The QES school camp in Tsam Chuk Wan, Sai Kung, New Territories was opened in 1962. With the transfer of sovereignty over Hong Kong to China in 1997, the original school badge with a crown was changed to a new one with the logo of the Education Department. Later, the Education Department was replaced by the Education and Manpower Bureau (EMB) (now Education Bureau, EDB), and the school badge was changed again.

The school's new annex was opened in September 2004.

== School camp ==
Founded a campsite in Tsam Chuk Wan, Sai Kung District, the New Territories in 1962, Queen Elizabeth School is the only school in Hong Kong which owns a school camp.

=== Camp Warden Association ===
The Camp Warden Association (CWA) is responsible for organizing camping activities for students and to manage the condition of the campsite.

- Training Course (TC): A year-long program offered every year to S.3 students who wish to join CWA.
- Wardens in Training (Wits): Students in TC are called Wits.
- Wardens: Students who passed the course and are recognized as qualified member of CWA.

CWA is composed of three major boards.

- Administration Board: Responsible for promotion and external communication with alumni and school officials.
- Instruction Board: Responsible for preparing training materials for Wits.
- Maintenance Board: Responsible for maintaining facilities in campsite.

=== Facilities ===
- Main Gate
- Side Gate
- Classroom
- Classroom North
- Teacher's Room (beside classroom)
- Two store room
  - Store Hut
  - Store Room
- Kitchen
  - kitchen compound
- Two bathroom
  - Male's bathroom
  - Female's bathroom
- Four toilets
- Well
- Swing
- Rope course
- Campfire Site
- Barbecue Site
- Canoe Shied
- Jetty Gate
- Two jetty
  - Old Jetty
  - New Jetty
- Platform
- Old Temple

== Publications ==
- School magazines: published per year since 1954 when the school was founded. Issue 63 will be issued this year.
- 《未學集》: edited and issued by Chinese & Chinese History Society of the school per two years, formerly 《新苗集》. The last version is 《未學集五編》.
- Magazine for School Camp Golden Jubilee "From the Few to Many Camp 50 & Beyond"
- Other special magazines

== Achievements ==
- As of 2023, QES counts 5 winners of the prestigious Hong Kong Outstanding Students Awards, ranking 17th (tied with Wah Yan College, Hong Kong and Madam Lau Kam Lung Secondary School of MFBM) among all secondary schools in Hong Kong.
- Alumnus Dr Law Ka-Ho holds the highest record of 10 distinctions in School Certificate Examination, and 7 distinctions in the Matriculation Examination. Sing Tao Daily highlighted him as the [10+7] Summa Cum Laude (狀元). See the documented references in Section 13 on the Chinese Wikipedia page, and link to the Sing Tao news article.

== Principals ==
- Cheong Wai-fung (張維豐, 1954–1959)
- Arthur Hinton (韓敦 or 韓頓, 1959–1967)
- T. McC. Chamberlain (張伯倫, 1967–1970)
- H.N. McNeil (麥尼路, 1970–1975)
- Tan Peng-kian (陳炳乾, 1975–1980)
- Su Chung-jen (蘇宗仁, 1980–1992)
- Chan Ping-tat (陳秉達, 1992–1996)
- Yeung Chi-hung (楊志雄, 1996–1997)
- Sin Chow Dick-yee (冼周的兒, 1997–1998)
- Yeung Chi-hung (楊志雄, 1998–2001)
- Pang Cheung Yee-fan (彭張怡芬, 2001–2008)
- Tong Kwok-keung (唐國強, 2008–2012)
- Chan Ka-wai (陳家偉, 2012–2015 )
- Yuen Kwong-yip (袁廣業, 2015–2018)
- Eric Chan Cheung-wai (陳祥偉, 2018–2024)

== Notable alumni ==
=== Science, culture and art ===
- Ken P. Chong (張建平), Professor and researcher at the George Washington University and the National Institute of Standards and Technology, https://www.nist.gov/, Fellow of ASME, cited in the American Men & Women of Science. Former Director of Mechanics and Materials at the U.S. National Science Foundation [www.nsf.gov].
- Manying Ip (葉宋曼瑛): Professor of Asian Studies at Auckland University, expert on multicultural & transnational research. Fellow of the New Zealand Academy of Humanities and Royal Society of NZ.(Ref Ip)
- Dorothy Y. Ko, (高彦頤) Professor of History and Women's Studies, Barnard College, Columbia University.
- Hon-Yim Ko (高漢棪), Glenn L. Murphy Professor and Chair of Engineering, University of Colorado; Outstanding Educator of America, honored by the American Society of Engineering Education, Fellow of ASCE, cited in the American Men & Women of Science.
- Wing-Fai Leung (梁穎暉), Reader in Cultural and Media Industries, King's College London.
- Fuk Kwok Li (李復國) Director of Mars Projects, awarded NASA highest honours of Outstanding Leadership Medal and Distinguished Service Medal, cited in the American Men & Women of Science.
- Edward W Ng (伍煒國), mathematical scientist, California Institute of Technology, and NASA, Fellow of AAAS, cited in the American Men & Women of Science.
- Man-Chiu Poon (潘文釗), Professor, Departments of Medicine, Pediatrics and Oncology, University of Calgary; Fellow of the Royal College of Physicians and Surgeons of Canada (Ref. MC Poon)
- Peter T. Poon (潘天佑), Telecommunications manager and space technologist on NASA projects to Mars, Jupiter, Saturn, the Sun and Outer Solar System., profiled in Marquis Who's Who
- Patrick Tam, (譚秉亮) Deputy Director and Head of Embryology Unit, Children's Medical Research Institute; Professor, Discipline of Medicine, Sydney Medical School, University of Sydney; Foreign Fellow of British Royal Society. (Ref Tam)
- Benjamin Wah (華雲生), world-class computer scientist, Provost of CUHK, Fellow of AAAS & IEEE, cited in the American Men & Women of Science.
- Kon Max Wong (黄榦), Director, Communications Technology Research Centre, Canada Research Chair Professor in Signal Processing, McMaster University; Honorary Professor of Electrical Engineering, Imperial College, London; Fellow IEEE; Fellow Canadian Academy of Engineering; Fellow Royal Society of Canada. (Ref. Wong)
- Angelina K.Y. Chin (司徒娟兒), CIA, CRMA, is a retired executive of General Motors Co. and the Federal Reserve Bank of Chicago who has been extensively involved with The IIA, holding numerous volunteer roles, including chair of the Global Ethics Committee and the Audit Committee, and member of the North American Nominating Committee, Board of Regents, Professional Issues, and Education Products committees. She currently serves on the Internal Audit Foundation's Committee of Research and Education Advisors (CREA) and has co-authored and reviewed several Foundation publications, including Sawyer's Internal Auditing, 7th Edition – Enhancing and Protecting Organizational Value (2019).

=== Politics, economics and law ===
- Li Kwan-ha (李君夏): former Commissioner of the Hong Kong Police Force
- Pansy Wong (黃徐毓芳): New Zealand's first Asian Member of Parliament and Cabinet minister
- Rimsky Yuen Kwok-keung (袁國強): former Secretary for Justice of Hong Kong

=== Engineering ===
- Wun Ho-kit (溫皓傑), researcher in transport engineering at the Hong Kong University of Science and Technology
