= Ronald F. Scott =

British-born American geotechnical engineer

- Born: 9 April 1929; London, United Kingdom
- Died: 16 August 2005 (aged 76); Altadena, California, US
- Spouse: Pamela Wilkinson
- Children: 3

Academic background
- Thesis: Numerical Analysis of Consolidation Problems (1953)
- Academic advisors: Harl Preslar Aldrich Jr., Henry Paynter, Stephen H. Crandall

Academic work
- Doctoral students: Hon-Yim Ko

Ronald Fraser Scott (April 9, 1929 – August 16, 2005) was a British-born, American geotechnical engineer. An internationally recognized authority on the mechanics of soils, his lunar soil experiments on the Surveyor missions cleared the Apollo astronauts to walk safely on the moon.

== Early life and education ==
Scott was born in London on April 9, 1929, but grew up in Perth, Scotland. He earned a bachelor's degree in civil engineering from the University of Glasgow in 1951, a master's degree from the Massachusetts Institute of Technology in 1953 with the thesis titled, 'Numerical Analysis of Consolidation Problems' and a Doctor of Science from M.I.T. in 1955. His interest in soil behavior – possibly sparked by boyhood experience digging potatoes during World War II when the men were away at service – developed into a scientific understanding of soils as complicated two-phase media of solid particles and fluids. After graduation, he worked for the U.S. Army Corps of Engineers constructing pavements on permafrost in Greenland. He joined the engineering faculty at the California Institute of Technology as an assistant professor in 1958.

== Academic career ==
=== Lunar soil ===
In the 1960s, Scott was tapped to answer the question of whether or not the Apollo astronauts would sink into the ground during landing. Almost nothing was known about lunar soil at the time. Some believed it was composed of fine powder like talc that would not support the weight of a human. Others thought it was granular and firm like sand. To find out, Scott and Jet Propulsion Laboratory engineer Floyd Roberson developed a soil sampler that resembled a small, square backhoe shovel. The scoop would be mounted on an articulated, extensible trellis that could dig trenches, scrape up soil, lift large clods and drop them to break up the lumps. It could also measure the soil's resistant force and weight to determine properties of bearing strength, cohesion and density. Scott's proposal was accepted by NASA, and he was named a principal investigator on the Surveyor 3 and Surveyor 7 missions.

The sampler's first use was on Surveyor 3 in 1967. “For the next two weeks,” Scott wrote, “Floyd and I happily and sleeplessly played with the lunar surface soil on the inside surface of a 650-foot-diameter crater.” From those tests, he concluded that the lunar soil at the site was fine-grained with small cohesion and an internal friction angle of 35 degrees – similar to the properties of terrestrial sand - with a bearing strength of about 10 pounds per square inch (0.7 kilograms per square centimeter, or 98 kilopascals). The lunar soil was declared safe enough to walk on and solid enough to support the Apollo Lunar Module.

When Neil Armstrong stepped onto the moon's surface on July 20, 1969, he famously declared, “That’s one small step for a man, one giant leap for mankind.” Less remembered, the next words in his transmission confirmed Scott's prediction: “I sink in about an eighth of an inch. I’ve left a print on the surface.”

In November 1969, Apollo 12's lunar module landed close enough to Surveyor 3 that astronauts Charles Conrad and Alan Bean walked over to it. Conrad cut off the scoop and brought it back to Earth in two Teflon bags. Scott, who was present when the bags were opened, said, “If I had known I would see it again, I would have left the scoop completely packed with lunar soil.”

=== Martian soil ===
The two Viking spacecraft that landed on Mars in 1976 also needed soil samples, and again, Scott worked on those robotic collectors. Some of the soil collected by the Martian scoops was used in a life-detection experiment designed by Caltech biologist Norman Horowitz.

=== Terrestrial Soil ===
Scott was deeply interested in soil and foundation stability, important in landslides and dam failures. He was a consultant in the investigation of the Baldwin Hills Dam failure in 1963 and again in the 1978 Bluebird Canyon landslide in Laguna Beach, California. He studied the behavior of retaining walls and footing foundations during earthquakes. Scott's work also included design of underwater foundations of wastewater outfalls, offshore drilling structures and support anchors for guyed offshore towers.

In the 1970s, Scott advocated the use of centrifuges to study soil properties and behavior under conditions of high static and dynamic pressure. He argued that soil mechanical properties are highly dependent on overburden pressures that can't be reproduced in the laboratory with mechanical or hydraulic presses. Deeply buried soil is under higher pressure and, therefore, has a higher failure pressure level than surface soil. To reproduce the soil pressure at the bottom of a large earthen dam with a 1/100 scale model would require an effective gravity 100 times that of the earth. Scott showed that he could achieve those acceleration levels by spinning the model in a centrifuge. Moreover, his centrifuge could incorporate seismic motion using a computer-controlled shaking table, enabling him to model the response of a dam to a large earthquake.

Scott was elected to the National Academy of Engineering in 1974 and was named the Dotty and Dick Hayman Professor of Engineering at Caltech in 1987. He retired from the Institute in 1998. Scott died from cancer on August 16, 2005, in Altadena, California.

== Honors and awards ==
- 1969 Walter L. Huber Civil Engineering Research Prize, American Society of Civil Engineers
- 1972 Norman Medal, American Society of Civil Engineers
- 1972 Fellow, John Simon Guggenheim Memorial Foundation
- 1974 National Academy of Engineering
- 1977 Newcomb Cleveland Prize, American Association for the Advancement of Science
- 1982 Thomas A. Middlebrooks Award, American Society of Civil Engineers
- 1983 Terzaghi Lecturer, American Society of Civil Engineers
- 1987 Rankine Lecturer, British Geotechnical Association
- 1995 Honorary Doctorate, University of Glasgow

== Books ==
- Principles of Soil Mechanics, Addison-Wesley 1963
- with Jack Schoustra: Soil Mechanics and Engineering, McGraw Hill 1968
- Foundation Analysis, Prentice Hall 1981
