= Hon-Yim Ko =

- Occupations: academic, geotechnical engineer

Academic background
- Education: Queen Elizabeth School, Hong Kong
- Alma mater: Hong Kong University, Hong Kong (B.Sc.), California Institute of Technology, US (M.S., Ph.D.)
- Thesis: Static Stress-Deformation Characteristics of Sand (1966)
- Doctoral advisor: Ronald F. Scott
- Website: University site

Hon-Yim Ko is a Professor Emeritus at the University of Colorado, where he held the Glenn L. Murphy Professor and Chair of Civil, Environmental and Architectural Engineering from 2000 to 2010. He has won national renown in research and teaching in the specialties of centrifuge modeling, earthquake engineering, mechanical properties of soil and rock, constitutive modeling and soil-structure interaction. His research resulted in over 200 scholarly publications, and prestigious research awards, including the Huber Research Prize by the American Society of Civil Engineers; and the Colorado Engineering Council Gold Medal.

He excelled in university teaching, being awarded the Outstanding Educator of America from by the American Society for Engineering Education and the Hutchinson Memorial Teaching Award, U. of Colorado.

He is cited in the American Men and Women of Science.

== Education ==
Ko was educated in the Queen Elizabeth School, Hong Kong, and received his B.Sc. at the University of Hong Kong. He went for graduate studies in the California Institute of Technology where he obtained the M.S. and Ph.D. degrees.
