= Sai Kung Country Park =

Country park in Hong Kong

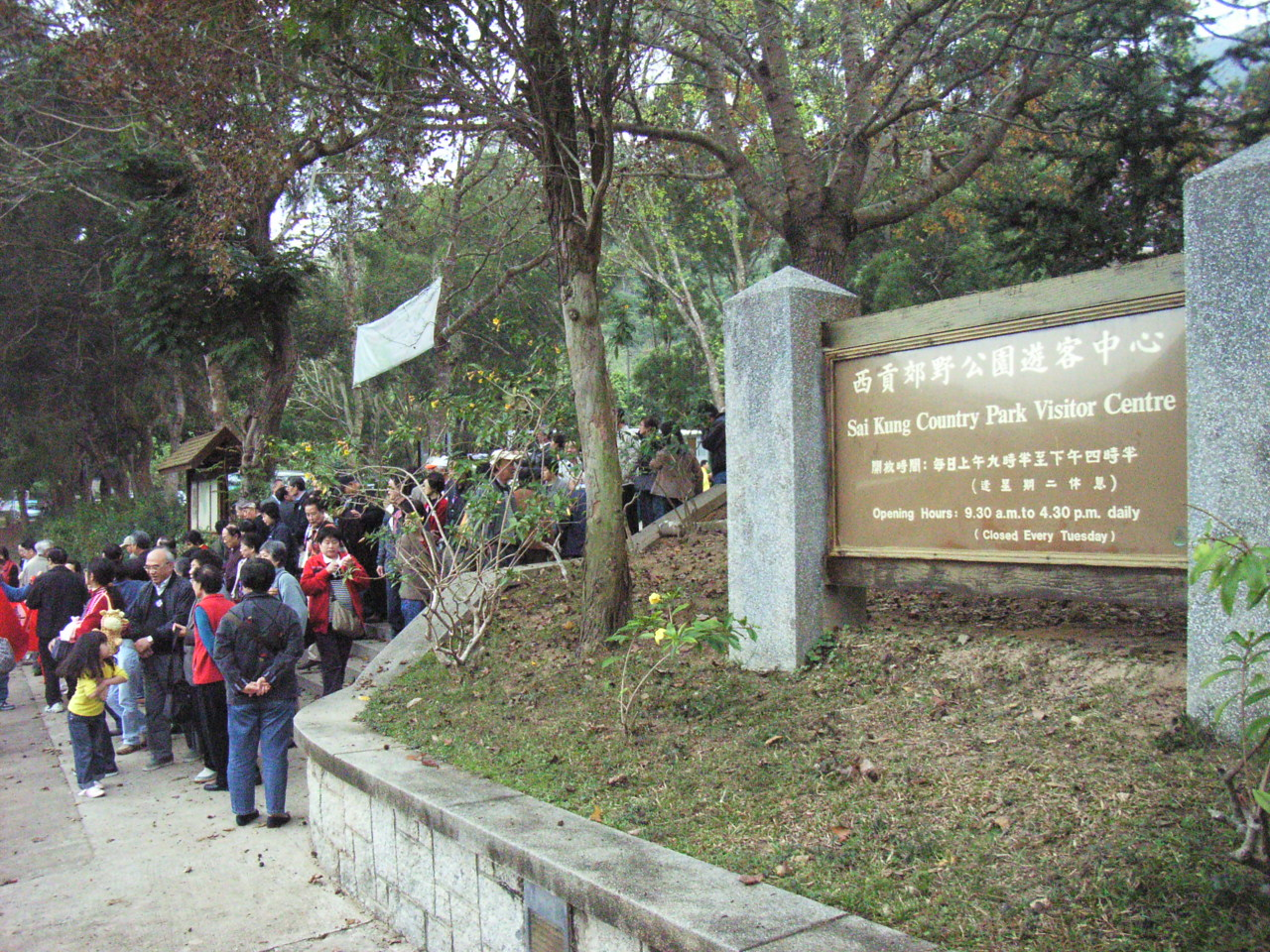
Sai Kung Country Park Visitors Centre

Sai Kung Country Park, a country park on the Sai Kung Peninsula in northeast Hong Kong, comprises:

- Sai Kung East Country Park
- Sai Kung West Country Park
- Sai Kung West Country Park (Wan Tsai Extension)
