= Pak Tam Chung =

Area in Hong Kong

Coordinates: 22°24′N 114°19.2′E

- Chinese: 北潭涌
Transcriptions
Standard Mandarin
- Hanyu Pinyin: Běi tán chōng
Yue: Cantonese
- Jyutping: Bak1 taam4 cung1

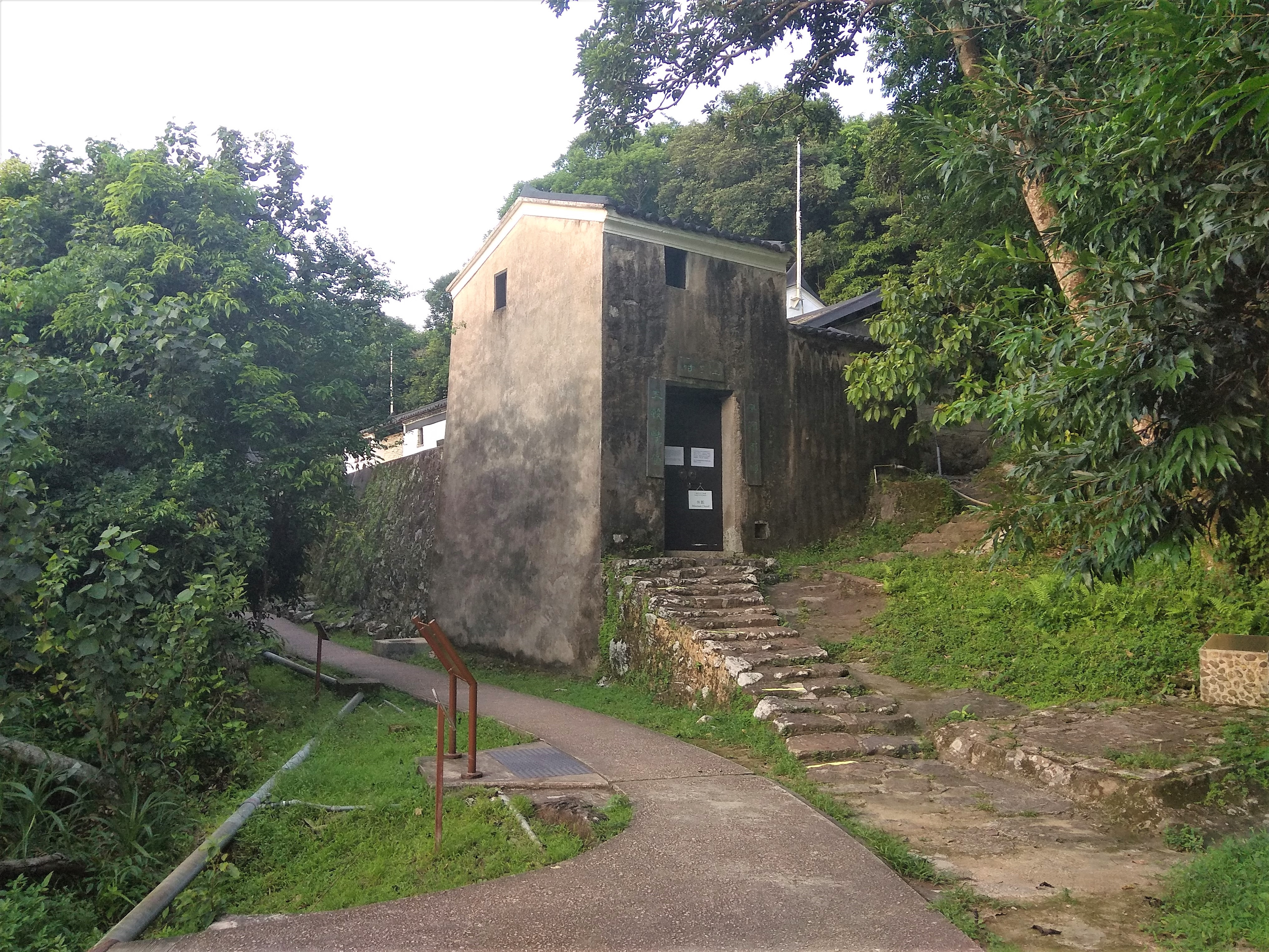
Entrance of the Sheung Yiu Folk Museum in Pak Tam Chung.

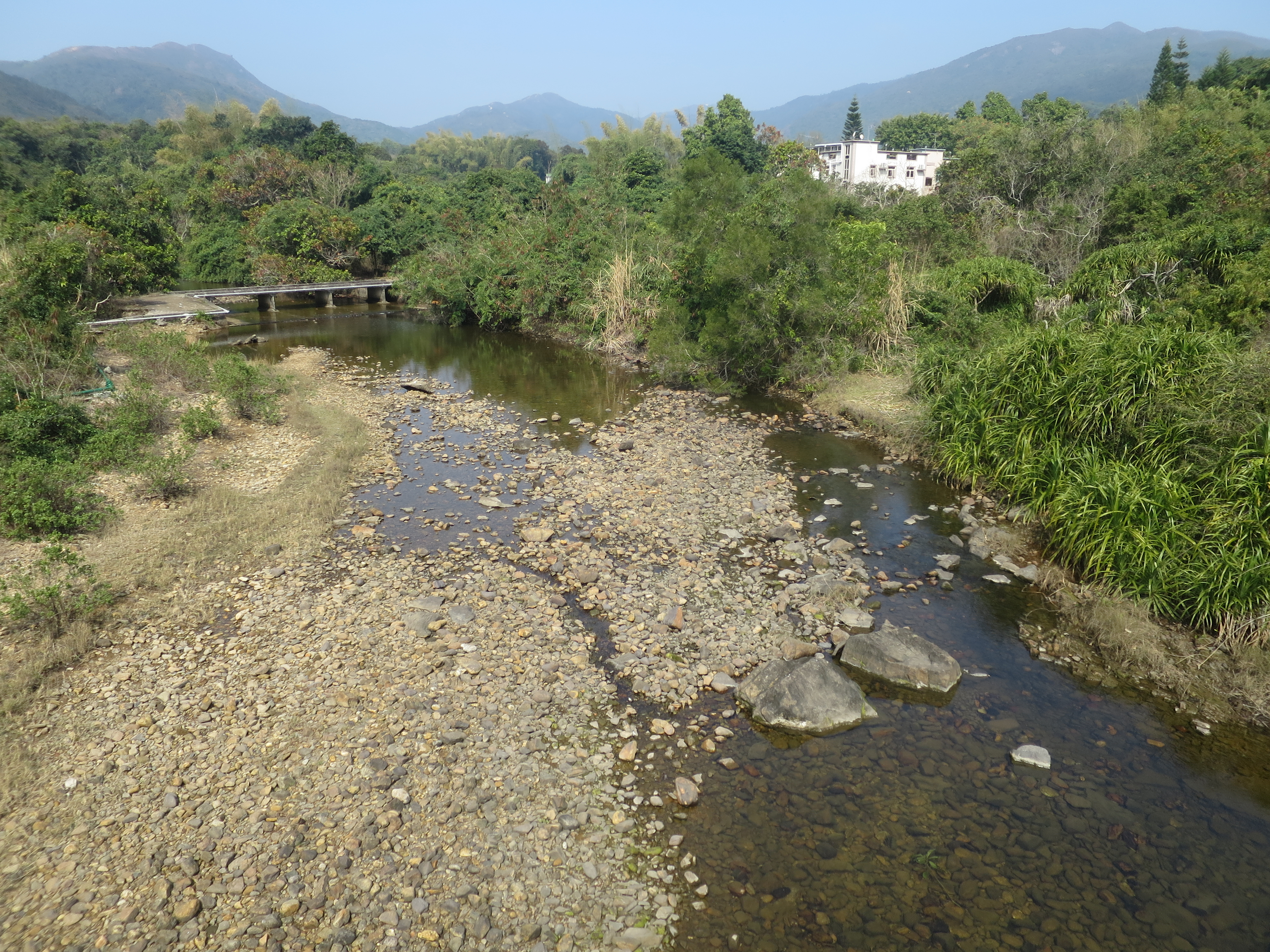
The creek Lung Hang (龍坑) has low flow in winter

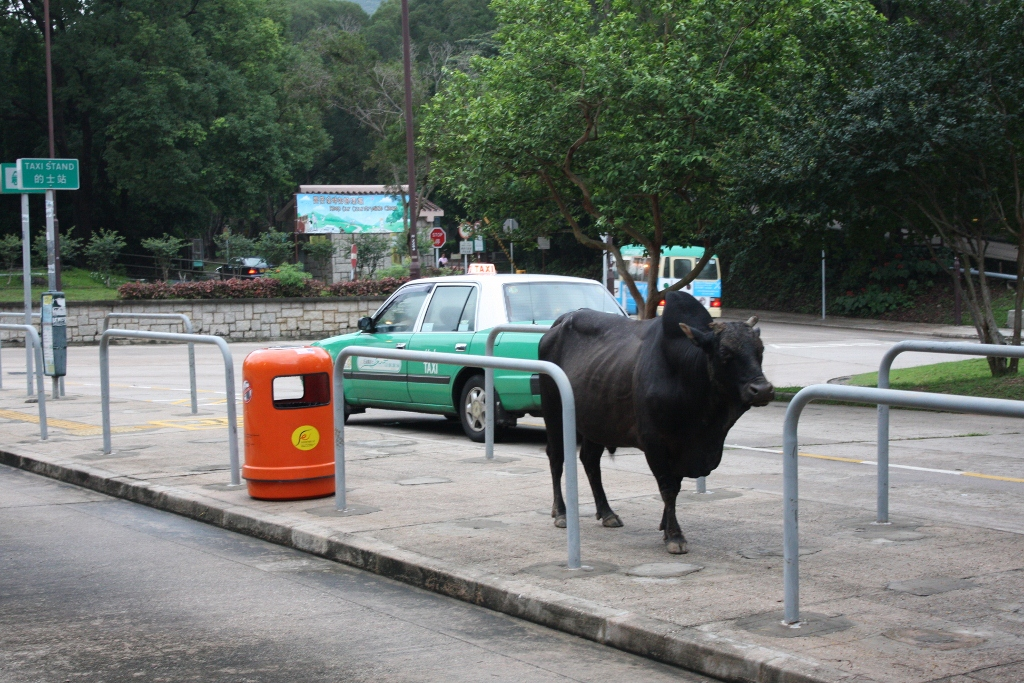
Taxi stand at Pak Tam Chung

Pak Tam Chung (Chinese: 北潭涌) is an area in the southern part of the Sai Kung Peninsula in the New Territories of Hong Kong. It is administratively under the Sai Kung District.

== Features ==
Pak Tam Chung was described as consisting of six villages in 1911 with fewer than 405 inhabitants: Wong Yi Chau (黃宜洲), Pak Tam (北潭), Sheung Yiu (上窰), Tsak Yue Wu (鯽魚湖), Wong Keng Tei (黃麖地) and Tsam Chuk Wan. The six villages were all inhabited by Hakka people, with the exception of two hamlets in Pak Tam.

There is a visitor centre for nature education set up by the Hong Kong Government. Near the centre is a vehicle barrier leading to the restricted portion of Sai Kung East Country Park in Pak Tam Chung. For vehicles, only those with authorisation can enter the area and reach places like Hoi Ha, Pak Tam Au and High Island Reservoir.

There are a number of picnic and barbecue facilities within Pak Tam Chung, including a site designed for physically disabled visitors.

Po Leung Kuk owns a holiday camp site in Pak Tam Chung, the Po Leung Kuk Pak Tam Chung Camp (保良局北潭涌渡假營).

== Climate ==
Climate data for Pak Tam Chung (1996–2020)
Month	Jan	Feb	Mar	Apr	May	Jun	Jul	Aug	Sep	Oct	Nov	Dec	Year
Mean daily maximum °C (°F)	19.3 (66.7)	19.7 (67.5)	22.1 (71.8)	25.7 (78.3)	29.0 (84.2)	31.1 (88.0)	32.3 (90.1)	32.2 (90.0)	31.2 (88.2)	28.9 (84.0)	25.3 (77.5)	21.0 (69.8)	26.5 (79.7)
Daily mean °C (°F)	14.7 (58.5)	15.4 (59.7)	18.1 (64.6)	21.6 (70.9)	25.3 (77.5)	27.3 (81.1)	27.9 (82.2)	27.6 (81.7)	26.7 (80.1)	24.3 (75.7)	20.6 (69.1)	16.0 (60.8)	22.1 (71.8)
Mean daily minimum °C (°F)	10.9 (51.6)	12.1 (53.8)	15.1 (59.2)	18.8 (65.8)	22.4 (72.3)	24.2 (75.6)	24.6 (76.3)	24.3 (75.7)	23.4 (74.1)	20.6 (69.1)	16.8 (62.2)	12.1 (53.8)	18.8 (65.8)
Average precipitation mm (inches)	43.0 (1.69)	35.7 (1.41)	72.1 (2.84)	114.6 (4.51)	346.3 (13.63)	497.2 (19.57)	345.4 (13.60)	377.3 (14.85)	275.4 (10.84)	96.0 (3.78)	43.9 (1.73)	31.0 (1.22)	2,277.9 (89.67)
Average relative humidity (%)	77.1	79.9	82.5	85.6	86.6	87.6	86.7	86.9	83.6	78.1	77.5	72.9	82.1
Source: Hong Kong Observatory

== See also ==
- Sheung Yiu Folk Museum
- Historic churches of Sai Kung Peninsula
- Sai Kung Town
- Tai Po District
