= Sai Kung Peninsula =

Peninsula in the easternmost part of the New Territories in Hong Kong

Coordinates: 22.426°N 114.323°E

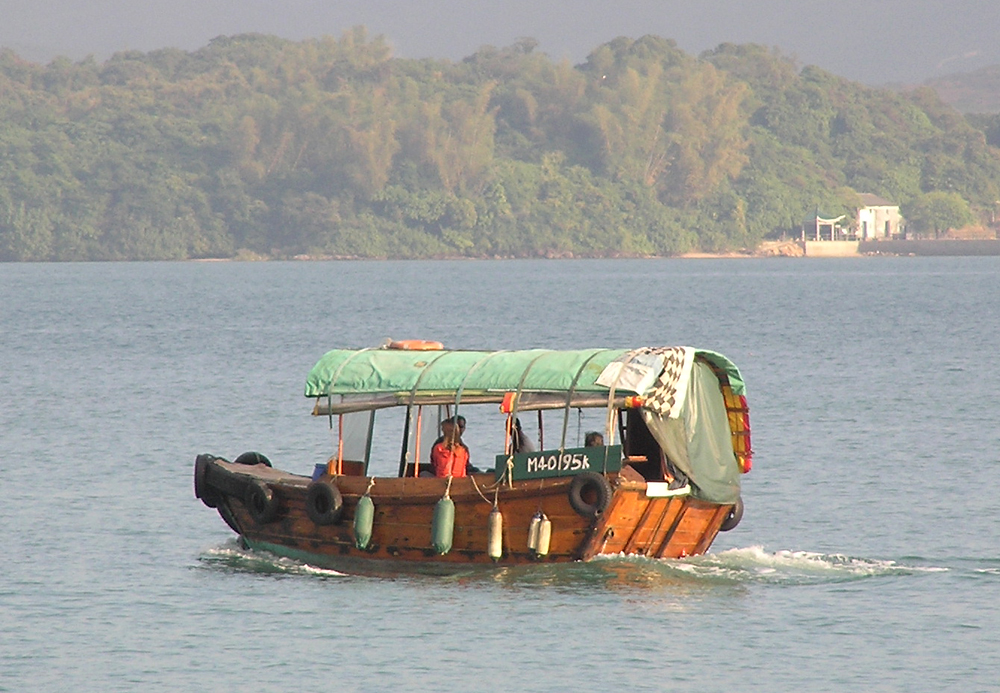
- Kai-to is an important means of transportation connecting Sai Kung Peninsula and the outlying islands off the coast of the Sai Kung Peninsula.
- Traditional Chinese: 西貢半島
- Simplified Chinese: 西贡半岛
Transcriptions
Standard Mandarin
- Hanyu Pinyin: Xīgòng Bàndǎo
Yue: Cantonese
- Jyutping: sai1 gung3 bun3 dou2

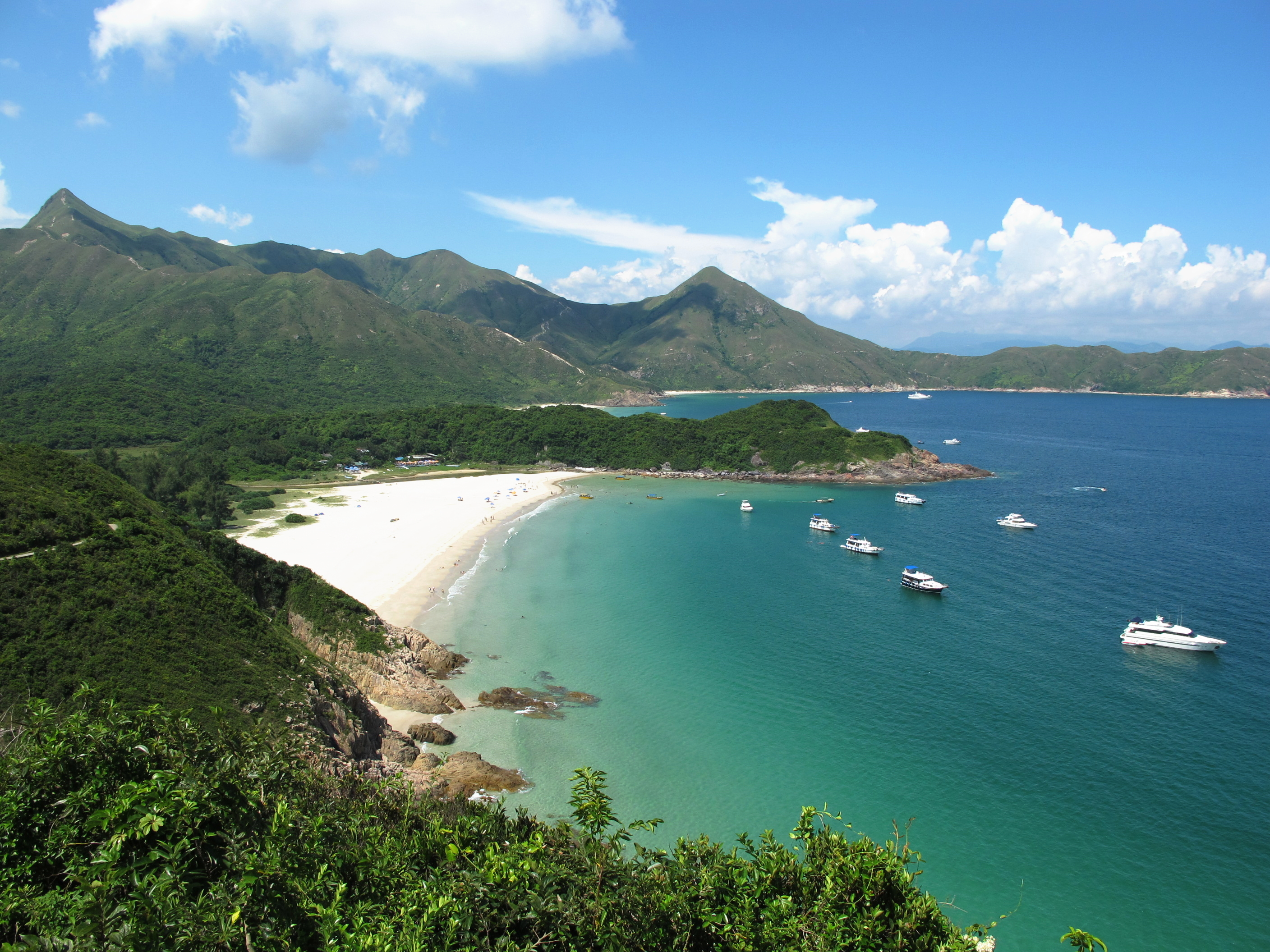
Tai Long Wan

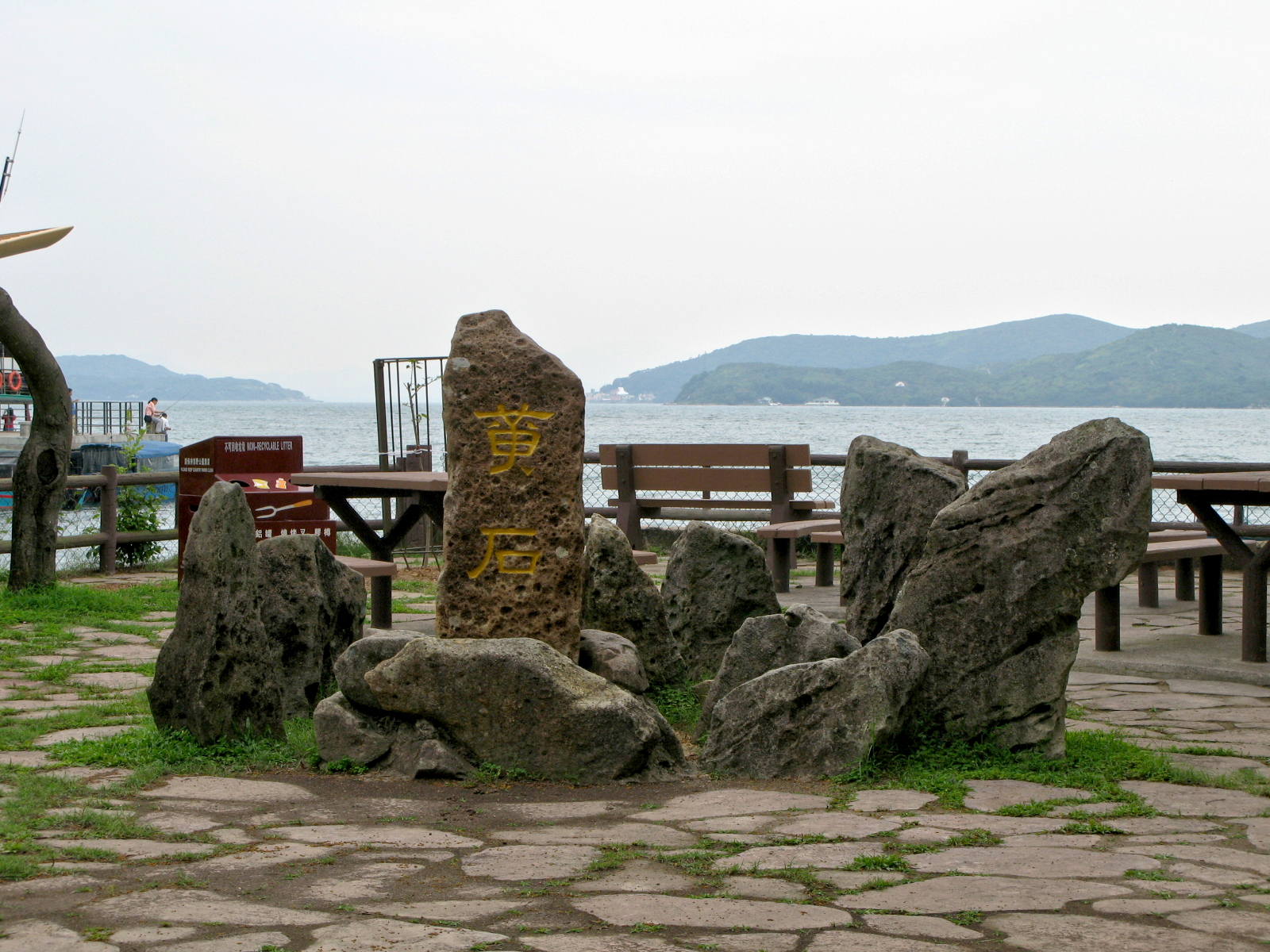
Wong Shek

The Sai Kung Peninsula (Chinese: 西貢半島; Jyutping: sai1 gung3 bun3 dou2) is a peninsula in the easternmost part of the New Territories in Hong Kong. Its name comes from Sai Kung Town in the central southern area of the peninsula. The southern part of the peninsula is administered by Sai Kung District, the north by Tai Po District and the northwest by Sha Tin District.

== Description ==
The vast land and sea area of the peninsula remains untouched by urbanisation, and it is mostly covered by country parks. The marine ecosystem in Hoi Ha Wan is protected by law. Sai Kung is also a popular place for hiking. The starting point for the 100 kilometres (62 mi) MacLehose Trail is at Pak Tam Chung in Sai Kung.

There are also water sports sites along the shoreline offering kayaking, snorkelling and swimming among other activities. In addition, Sai Kung's Hoi Ha Wan (海下灣) is one of the most easily accessed coral dive sites in Hong Kong. It is suitable for diver training and for newly certified divers.

As a former fishing village, Sai Kung Town is a prime attraction for seafood lovers, locals and tourists alike. Visitors can stroll around the regional market center of Sai Kung Town or explore the back lanes, visit the Tin Hau Temple, feast on seafood or enjoy different delicacies at Western-style pubs and restaurants. There is also a famous dessert restaurant called Honeymoon Dessert that brings in many visitors from all over Hong Kong and even from abroad.

In the northern Sai Kung Peninsula, there is also an area called Wong Shek. There are places where people can barbecue and enjoy the view of the sea. However, to protect the natural environment of Wong Shek, the Government controls the number of vehicles entering the area. There is a gate at Pak Tam Chung on the way towards Wong Shek, only allowing vehicles with permits to go through.

Off the coast of the Sai Kung Peninsula, there are many outlying islands. On summer nights, many people hire small boats known as kai-tos or sampans to have leisurely trips through the island-dotted inland sea of Port Shelter. Popular islands to visit include:

- Kau Sai Chau
- Sharp Island (Kiu Tsui Chau)
- High Island (Leung Shuen Wan Chau)
- Pak Sha Chau (lit. white sand island)
- Yeung Chau (lit. sheep island)
- Yim Tin Tsai (lit. little salt field)

Although Wong Shek and Hoi Ha Wan are geographically in the northern part of Sai Kung Peninsula, they are under the administration of Tai Po District, due to their reliance on ferry transport from Tai Po for access before the construction of Sai Sha Road.

== History ==
From about the 14th century, fishing communities lived on boats in sheltered inlets on the peninsula. They later founded small coastal villages, building temples in honour of Tin Hau and Hung Shing in places of permanent anchorage. In addition to coastal fishing, there were small supporting industries of salt-making and boat building.

Pirates were rampant in Sai Kung during the Qing Dynasty. The Xin'an County Chronicles of Jiaqing recorded that "In September of the 11th year of Kangxi (1672), the Taiwanese traitor Li Qi and others led pirate ships to rob the local area, wandered to Haoyong and landed, and slaughtered the villagers." Later, the county magistrate Li Kecheng and the guerrilla Cai Chang led the local militia and soldiers to chase and suppress them to Lek Yuen (now Sha Tin) to suppress them. Today, the villages in Haoyong and Xiangsiwan still have the iron cannons used for defense in those days. Faced with the threat of pirates, the Hakka villagers with relatively weak clan power united with other clans with in-laws or neighbors to live in villages and gather strength in order to protect their lives and property. As a result, the villages in Sai Kung are dominated by people with mixed surnames, which is very different from the other New Territories where the big clans such as Deng, Wen, Liao, Hou, Peng, and Tao formed single-surname villages that are capable of controlling local affairs.

Agricultural settlements began later and several villages already existed by the year 1660. Economic development began in the middle of the 19th century when Hong Kong was opened as a port. There was an especially prosperous kiln industry, which produced lime, bricks and tiles to supply Hong Kong during the early days. Sheung Yiu Village, once opened as a Folk Museum, was a good example of a fortified settlement well known for lime-making.

Until 1970, the part of Sai Kung beyond Tai Mong Tsai was still remote, reachable only on foot or by kai-tos (local ferry). However work started in 1971 to create the High Island Reservoir, with a capacity of 273,000,000 cubic metres (9.6×10^{9} cu ft), by closing off both ends of the Kwun Mun Channel which separated the High Island from the main peninsula. In 1979, the project was completed, providing also two new roads to the area. Since then, the city people can reach this relatively unspoiled area for recreation.

== Geology ==
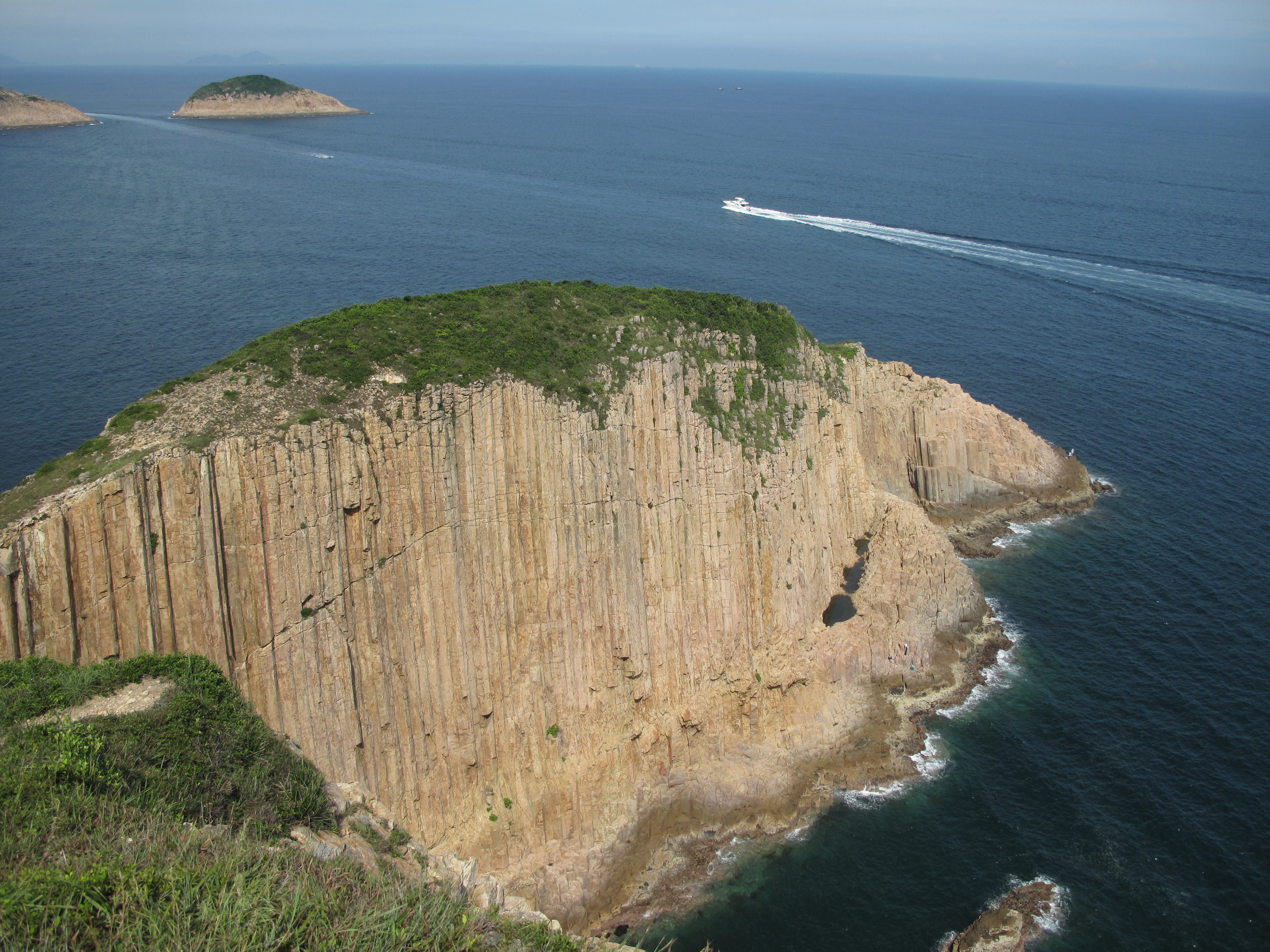
Hexagonal volcanic tuffs at Po Pin Chau, near the East Dam of High Island Reservoir.

The Sai Kung Peninsula and the islands near the coast are composed almost entirely of volcanic materials. Coarse tuffs are found in the northern and south-western parts of the Peninsula and Tap Mun area. Pyroclastic rocks with some lava are found in the eastern part of the Sharp Peak and Sham Chung areas. Acid lavas are found in the area surrounding the High Island Reservoir and the south islands such as Kau Sai Chau, Tiu Chung Chau and Basalt Island, banded acid lava with some welded tuffs are found in the central and southern shore of Pak Tam Chung area.

The most spectacular of all are the hexagonal columnar joints which are found near the east dam of the High Island Reservoir and Po Pin Chau area. They are the results of the uniform cooling of tuff. This natural landscape is complemented by the nearby gigantic water works.

Along the south-eastern coast and on the offshore islands that are exposed to the easterly winds and sea waves, interesting landforms such as sea caves, stacks, arches and inlets add to the beauty of the natural landscape.

== Vegetation ==
Grassland generally covers the hilltops, and across the Peninsula, there is an overall gradient from the grassland in the east to the woodland in the west.

Grassland species are predominantly minireed, duck-beak grass and false staghorn fern. Shrubs cloth the lower slopes and species for Melastoma, Rhodomyrtus, Baeckea, Eurya and Gordonia are commonly found.

Natural woodland, often in strips along the valleys or as patches behind villages are rich in native species of Machilus, Litsea, Sapium, Ficus, Sterculia and Heptapleurum.

Forest plantations, the result of both direct government planting and government-assisted village planting in the 1950s cover the hillslopes, are mostly in the western part of the Peninsula. Chinese red pine was the most important species planted and many of these old pines are now approaching senility and suffer from nematode attack. Fortunately the under-storey native broad-leafed trees are growing up to take their place.

The long and irregular coastline of the Peninsula also presents a wide variety of sea shore conditions for specialised and interesting plant communities to develop.

== Wildlife ==
The grassy hillside of Sai Kung Peninsula has few birds. Around the picnic and barbecue sites, crested mynah and Eurasian tree sparrow may be seen feeding on scraps of left-over food. In patches of shrubs, Chinese bulbul can commonly be seen feeding on berries. In the densely wooded areas species such as greater coucal, great tit and Oriental magpie nest. The old fung shui woods are particularly attractive to winter visitors such as thrushes which migrate to Hong Kong from China. Kingfishers can be found searching for food in streams.

Most large wild animals are nocturnal and are rarely seen but porcupine, pangolin, masked palm civet, leopard cat, wild boar and python have been sighted in the area.
