= Wuqiu Township =

Wuqiu Township may refer to:

In the People's Republic of China

- Wuqiu Township, Changyuan County (武邱乡) in Changyuan County, Henan Province

In the Republic of China (Taiwan)

- Wuqiu Township, Kinmen County (烏坵鄉) in Kinmen County, Fujian Province

See also

- Wuqiu (disambiguation)
