= Republic of China Marine Corps =

Arm of the Republic of China Navy

- 中華民國海軍陸戰隊
- Emblem of the Republic of China Marine Corps with the map of ROC claimed lands of mainland China, Outer Mongolia, and Russia.
- Active: 1914–1946, 1947–present
- Country: Republic of China (Taiwan)
- Type: Marines
- Size: 10,000 active personnel (2023)
- Part of: Republic of China Navy
- Headquarters: Zuoying, Kaohsiung, Republic of China (Taiwan)
- Mottos: 永遠忠誠 "Forever Loyal" (Semper Fidelis)
- March: 海軍陸戰隊隊歌 "Marine Corps Song"
- Engagements: Warlord Era; Northern Expedition; Interwar period; Sino-Soviet conflict (1929); Second Sino-Japanese War; World War II; Pacific War; Cold War; Chinese Civil War

Commanders
- Commander of Marine Corps Command: Lieutenant-General Fan Chuan-sheng

Insignia
- Flag

- Unit colour

The Republic of China Marine Corps (ROCMC; Chinese: 中華民國海軍陸戰隊; pinyin: Zhōnghuá Mínguó Hǎijūn lù zhàn duì), commonly known as the National Military Marine Corps (Chinese: 國軍海軍陸戰隊; pinyin: Guójūn Hǎijūn lù zhàn duì), is the amphibious arm of the Republic of China Navy (ROCN) responsible for amphibious warfare, counter-landing and reinforcement of the areas under the jurisdiction of the Republic of China (ROC), including the island of Taiwan, Kinmen, and the Matsu Islands, and defense of ROCN facilities, also functioning as a rapid reaction force and a strategic reserve capable of amphibious assaults.

Established in 1947 on mainland China, the ROCMC is considered the most selective branch within the ROC Armed Forces. The ROC Marines have gained much publicity for the "Road to Heaven" phase of one of their training courses which is the final phase of the 10-week long selection program for their special forces, the Amphibious Reconnaissance and Patrol Unit.

The ROC Marine Corps' official motto is "Forever Loyal" (Chinese: 永遠忠誠; pinyin: Yǒngyuǎn zhōngchéng), the Chinese translation of "Semper Fidelis". The ROC Marines train with the USMC though these are generally classified, unofficial, or with trainees officially considered by either side as "observers."

== Organization ==
The main force of the ROC Marine Corps consists of two Marine Brigades assisted by the Amphibious Vehicle Group, along with the Amphibious Reconnaissance and Patrol Unit, with the latter being comparable to the USMC Force Reconnaissance. There used to be three brigades, but one of them was reorganized into an air defense guard group in 2013.

=== Structure ===
- Marine Corps Command (海軍陸戰隊指揮部)
  - Combat Support Group (戰鬥支援大隊): formed in 2010 with the Logistics Group and the Communications, Information, Electronic Warfare Group. In 2013 the Corps HQ Battalion was added to the Support Group. It provides logistical, engineering, medical, and military band services to the Marine Corps.
    - Support Squadron (支援中隊), formerly the Corps HQ battalion (隊部營)
    - Health company (衛生連)
    - Honor guard company (儀隊連)
    - Security guard company (警衛連)
    - Logistics company (輜汽連)
    - 272nd Company of the Marine Corps Military Police (陸戰憲兵第二七二連)
    - Military band (軍樂隊)
  - Amphibious Armor Group (登陸戰車大隊): created in 1997 from the 651st Regiment, and currently has four transport, two artillery, and one support squadron. The transport vehicles used are the AAV7 and LVTP-5.
    - 4 Amphibious Transport Squadrons (運輸中隊), includes two AAV7 squadrons.
    - 2 Amphibious Artillery Squadrons (砲兵中隊)
    - Support Squadron (支援中隊)
  - Amphibious Reconnaissance and Patrol Unit (海軍陸戰隊兩棲偵搜大隊): Formed in 1997 and nicknamed "Frogmen," it is regarded as the ROC Marine Corps counterpart to MARSOC or Force Reconnaissance. Over half of the 600 troops of this unit are aboriginal Taiwanese.
    - 3 Reconnaissance Companies (偵搜中隊)
    - 1 Special Service Company (特勤中隊) (中華民國海軍陸戰隊特勤隊): the primarily counterterrorism related special unit of the ARP.
    - 1 Underwater Demolition Company (爆破中隊): equivalent of the U.S. Navy SEALs. Transferred to the Marine Corps Command from the ROC Navy in 2005.
    - 1 Support Company (支援中隊)
  - 66th Marine Brigade 'Vanguard' (陸戰六六旅「先鋒部隊」), Taipei area
  - 99th Marine Brigade 'Iron Force' (陸戰九九旅「鐵軍部隊」), Kaohsiung
  - Air defense guard group (防空警衛群)
  - Wuchiu Garrison Command (烏坵守備大隊)
  - Armed Force Joint Operation Training Base (三軍聯合作戰訓練基地)
  - Marine Corps Recruit Training Center (海軍陸戰隊新兵訓練中心):Providing soldier and recruit education
  - Marine Corps School (海軍陸戰隊學校): providing both officer and non-commissioned officer education.

== History ==
=== Early development ===
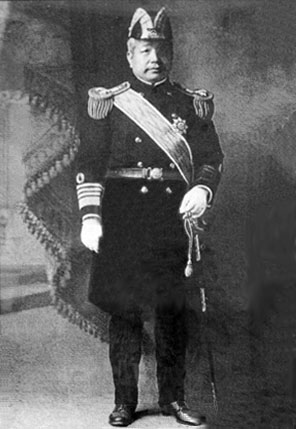
The ROC Marine Corps was founded in 1914 on the recommendation of Admiral Liu Guanxiong.

In 1909, the government of the Qing dynasty sent the Minister of the Navy, Zaixun, to study Western navies. Based on his findings in Britain, and noting the lack of coordination between China's ground and naval forces during the First Sino-Japanese War, he recommended to the Qing court that a naval land force be created to defend naval facilities and capture strategic locations. An effort was made to create a Naval Guard Corps at a base in Shandong, but it was still in the early stages of development when the 1911 Revolution broke out. With the establishment of the Republic of China, the Naval Guard Corps was under the control of the Beiyang government. During the Revolution, several Chinese naval cadets studying Japan returned to participate in the fighting, and became part of a small "Marine Corps" organized by the revolutionary governor of Shanghai, Chen Qimei. It had several hundred members and fought against Qing forces before being disbanded when the emperor abdicated. During the presidency of Yuan Shikai, the original Naval Guard Corps was redeployed from Shandong to Shanghai and was used to suppress the Second Revolution in 1913.

In December 1914, the Naval Guard Corps was reformed as the Republic of China Marine Corps by the Ministry of the Navy, on the recommendation of Admiral Liu Guanxiong, to better protect the Chinese coast. The ROCMC consisted of one battalion organized into four infantry companies, and was stationed in Fujian. A second battalion was added in 1918. From that point the Marine Corps was under the direct command of the Navy Ministry in Beijing. During the early Republic, the marines provided security at naval bases, and suffered from the same lack of pay and resources as the rest of the Navy because of the political division and warlordism. In 1922, a marine battalion was involved in operations against bandits in Fujian. In January 1923, a Marine Corps Command was created there by the Navy Ministry, and the Corps was expanded over the next several years to continue maintaining order in Fujian, with the 1st Mixed Brigade of the Marine Corps being created later that year. The brigade had four regiments along with artillery and machine gun battalions. Also during the warlord era, the Fengtien clique in northeast China and the forces of Sun Yat-sen's alternative government in the south also created marine units, but they never reached the strength of the main ROC Marine Corps in Fujian, which was loyal to the Beiyang government.

In 1925, the Navy Ministry under the admirals Lin Jianzhang and Du Xigui ordered the downsizing of the Marine Corps, with the 1st Marine Mixed Brigade being abolished in October, though was restored in January 1926 by Admiral Yang Shuzhuang and again participated in operations. When the Northern Expedition began, the Marine Corps in Fujian defected to the KMT National Revolutionary Army forces under He Yingqin, along with other elements of the Beiyang Fleet. In December 1926, the Marine Corps of the NRA was established. The marines fought with the National Revolutionary Army in 1927, and under Admiral Yang Shuzhuang the Corps was expanded to fight against warlords in the Fujian province, by incorporating the 11th Mixed Brigade of the former Beiyang forces. In August two Marine Mixed Brigades and four independent regiments were created. A Marine unit was deployed for the campaign against the Zhili clique warlord Sun Chuanfang in the Yangtze River valley, while other units were continuing operations in Fujian. By 1928, the Marine Corps absorbed additional units and had more than doubled in size, consisting of two mixed brigades and six regiments, which were stationed at different locations along the Fujian coast.

The new Nationalist government reduced the size of the ROC Marine Corps in 1928 to save costs, with the independent regiments being combined into the two existing brigades. As of 1931, the two Marine brigades together had a total of over 14,412 personnel. Each brigade had two infantry regiments of three battalions each, and one artillery battalion. Around this time a Marine Corps General Command was established in Fujian to oversee their operations. In July 1933 the Ministry of the Navy issued the "Provisional Regulations for the Organization of the Marine Corps," which described the structure of a marine brigade as two infantry regiments, an artillery battery, and some support units.

=== Second Sino-Japanese War ===
During the Second Sino-Japanese War, the ROC Marine Corps was used to defend railroads, waterways, highways, and the coastline. During the war the Navy was used to support land operations, and it lost much of its personnel, which were made up for by transferring marines to the Navy.

After the Marco Polo Bridge incident in July 1937 that started the Second Sino-Japanese War, Japanese troops landed in Zhejiang province in September. The ROC 3rd Marine Regiment from the 2nd Marine Brigade was deployed to Zhejiang to defend Hangzhou, but the city had fallen by then, so the regiment stayed in Jinhua and Quzhou to defend those cities together with the Army. The 1st Marine Brigade was sent to Jiangxi province. In January 1938, the Military Commission ordered a reduction in the size of the Navy, including the Marine Corps, because of the war with Japan. The total number of marines is estimated to have been around 7,000. Later that month a regiment of the 1st Marine Brigade was deployed to stop Japanese landings along the Yangtze River, before being sent back to Jiangxi in February. In the spring of 1938 both marine brigades were used by the Navy Headquarters to defend the section of the Guangzhou–Hankou railway in the Hunan and Hubei. In 1939 the 1st Marine Brigade were used against bandits in western Hunan, and for the next several years the marines were used often for maintaining order in the border region of Hunan, Guizhou, and Sichuan. The 4th Marine Regiment was the only marine unit to remain in Fujian.

At the end of the war, the Chinese government decided to disband the Marine Corps. Admiral Chen Shaokuan, the head of the Navy, tried to prevent it and delayed implementing the order, arguing that the marines were needed to defend certain naval bases. But eventually the order was carried out. Several Marine units were merged into the Army. In July 1946, the disbanding of the Marine Corps was completed.

=== Restoration ===
The commander of the Republic of China Navy in the late 1940s, Admiral Gui Yongqing, decided to recreate the ROC Marine Corps in 1947 after speaking to the U.S. Marine general Gerald C. Thomas in Qingdao. Gui worked with the U.S. forces in East Asia, and after his return to China he thought the ROC Navy would benefit from having marines. He chose soldiers and officers from the Republic of China Army to become the members of the Marine Corps, and it was expanded over then next several years by additional volunteers from the Army. September 16, 1947, is considered to be the founding date of the current ROC Marine Corps.

The initial force of marines, a battalion commanded by Yang Houcai, was stationed in Nanjing before going to Shanghai later that year, and were deployed along the coast at different locations. Admiral Gui organized recruitment efforts for the Corps in the coastal cities of China. The reconstituted Marine Corps was organized into three regiments, with the 1st Marine Regiment being established in 1948 in Mawei, Fujian. As the communists made advances, a 2nd Marine Regiment was created by the Navy towards the end of 1948, and a 3rd Regiment in January 1949. They were deployed in coastal regions and some of the offshore islands of China. An artillery unit was transferred to the ROCMC from the Army. In March 1949 the three regiments, the artillery regiment, and Navy security forces were combined into the 2nd Marine Division.

By the late spring of 1949, two Marine Divisions of three regiments each were organized under a Marine Corps Command. They participated in fighting the Communists for the Zhoushan Islands of the Zhejiang Province, including at the Battle of Dengbu Island, and for the Wanshan Archipelago, in the Wanshan Archipelago Campaign. In August 1949, about 1,000 Marines from the 2nd Regiment of the 1st Division defended the Changshan Islands in Shandong Province from 30,000 Communist troops, where they fought to the death. Marines also saw action in Mawei, Fujian, and elsewhere. In 1950, elements of the 2nd Marine Brigade helped in the evacuation of Hainan.

==== Taiwan ====
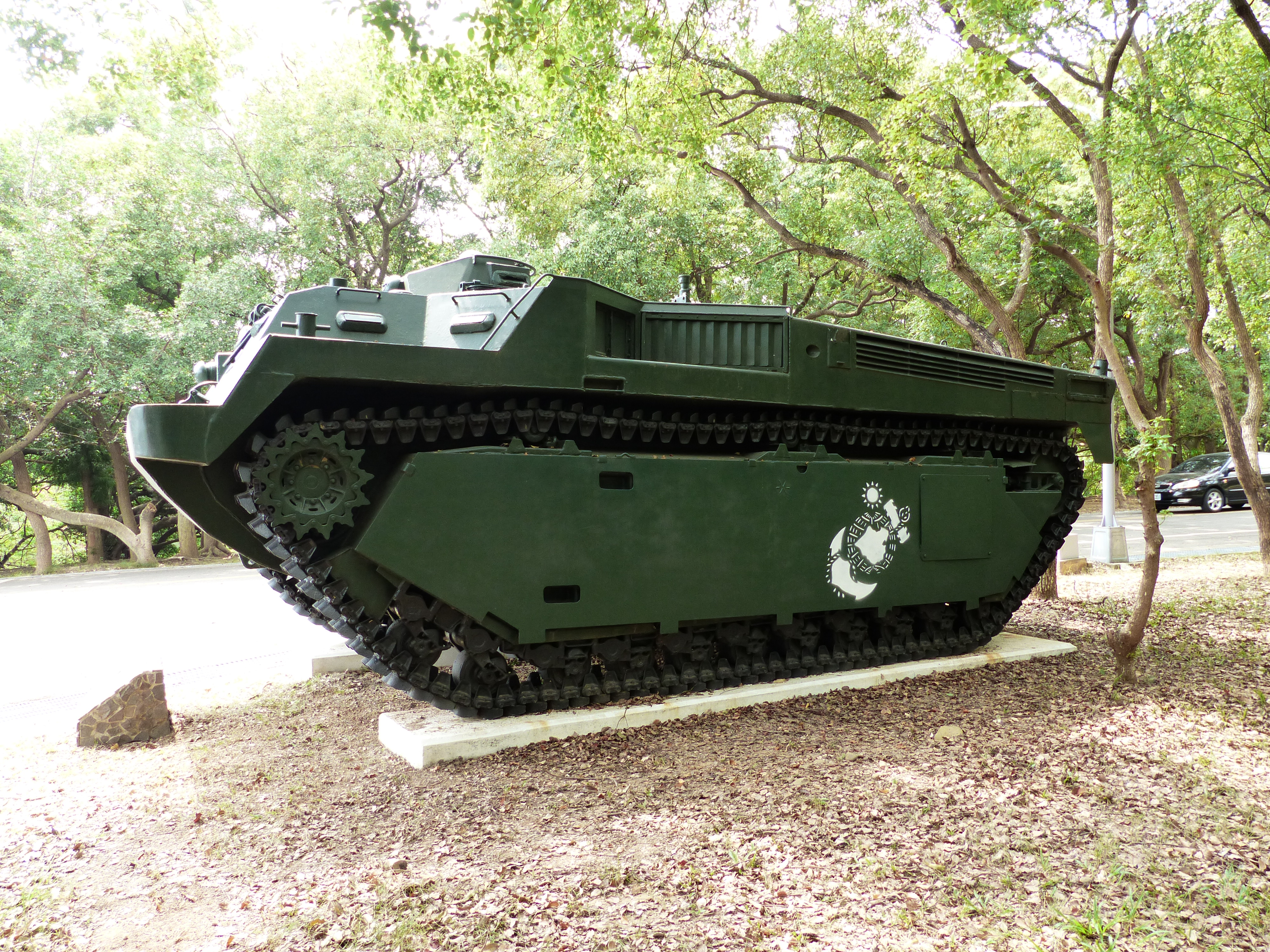
World War II era U.S. LVTs were used by Taiwan's Marine Corps for several decades.

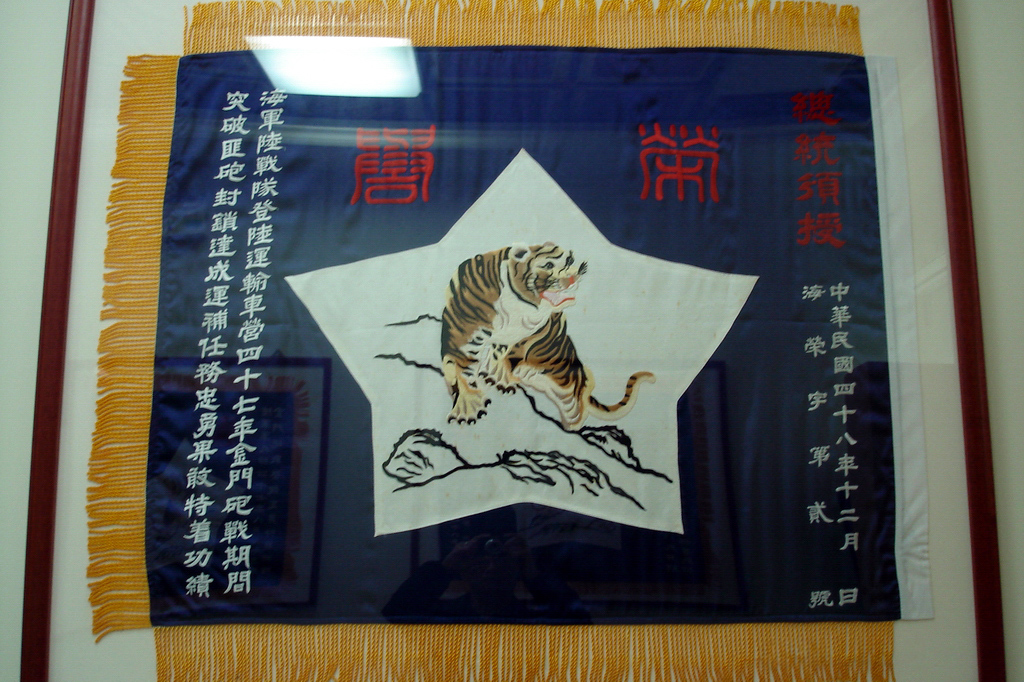
The ROC Marine Corps was awarded the Tiger Banner by Chiang Kai-shek in 1959 after the Second Taiwan Strait Crisis.

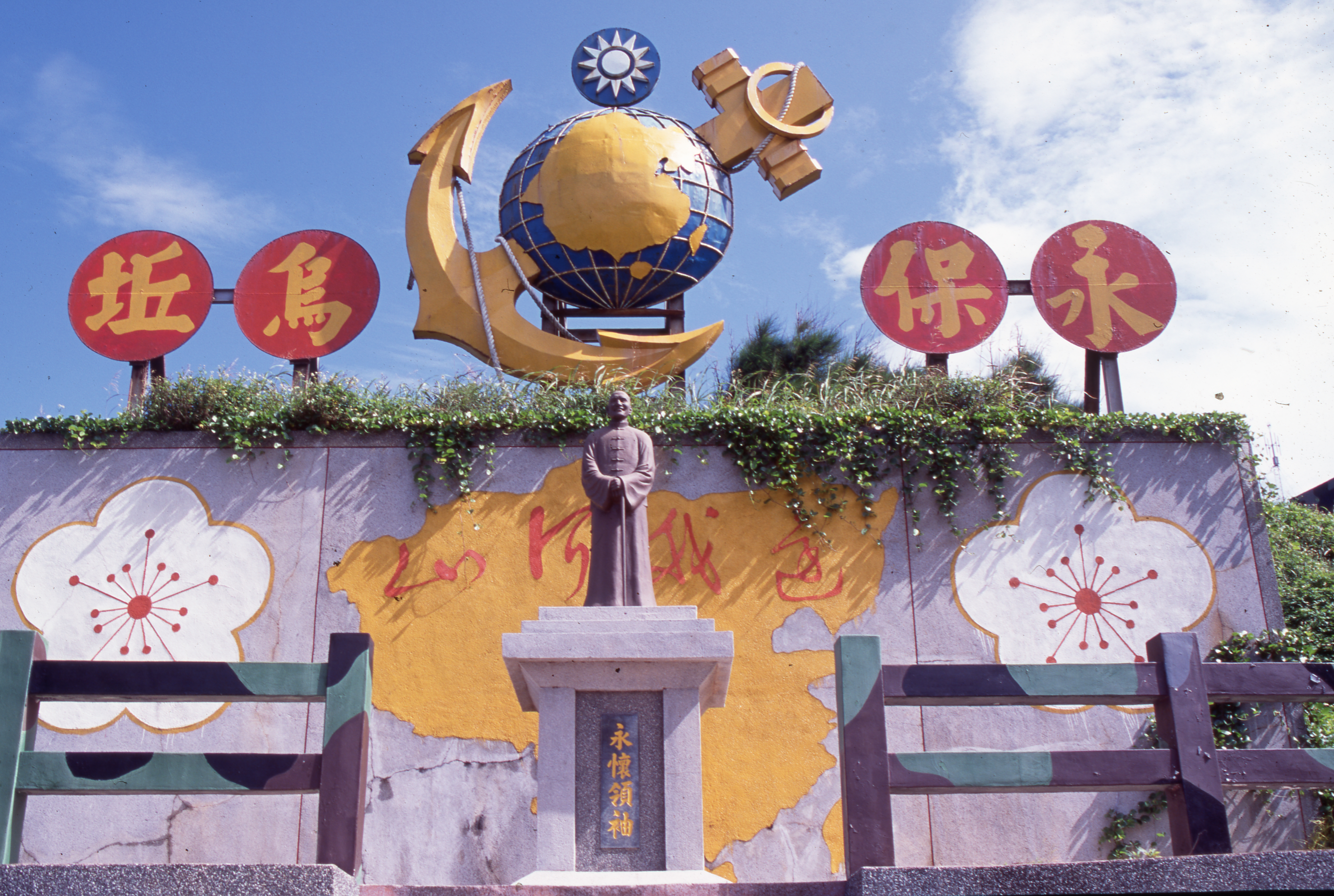
Statue of Chiang Kai-shek with the ROCMC emblem in the background (Wuqiu Lighthouse).

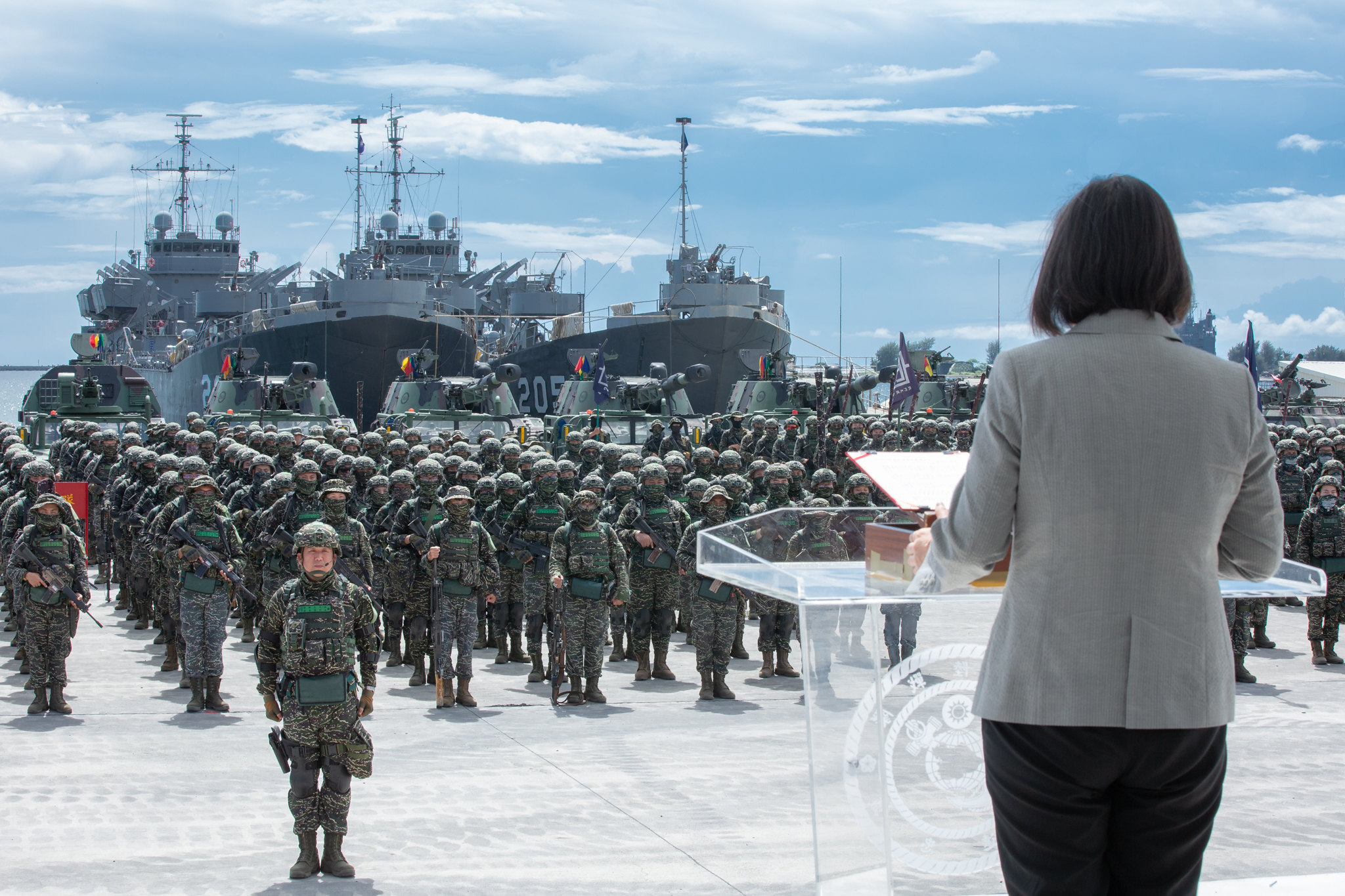
President of Republic of China (Taiwan) Tsai Ing-wen reviews a Marine Corps battalion in 2020

After the Nationalist Chinese retreat from the mainland to Taiwan in 1949, the expanded ROC Marine Corps was downsized by the government, from 18,563 to 13,713 personnel. The two Marine divisions were reformed into brigades.

When the Korean War broke out, the U.S. decided to provide assistance to the Chinese military on Taiwan, signing a mutual assistance agreement. The entire ROC Armed Forces, including the Marines, were heavily influenced by the U.S. military in the 1950s. The value of having a force that specialized in amphibious warfare became more obvious once the Nationalist Chinese government was on Taiwan. The task of the ROC Marine Corps would be to launch an amphibious invasion of the mainland and establish a bridgehead that would be used by the ROC Army. Now being given an important role, the Marines were expanded and trained to be an elite force with help from the United States.

In 1951, USMC Major Robert B. Carney Jr. became the American advisor to the Commandant of the ROCMC, General Zhou Yuhuan, as part of the military assistance to Taiwan (ROC) from the United States under the Mutual Security Act. The American advisory mission was later expanded, and they helped the Chinese Nationalists restructure the ROCMC, consisting of several brigades that were similar to a regimental combat team. The Corps took on a structure that was similar to a U.S. Marine division with additional support units. Around this time the service adopted its insignia with a map of China on a globe, an anchor, and a 12-point KMT White Sun emblem above them. The ROCMC also received American equipment and training from the advisors. The Marine Corps School was established for officer training in 1952. The U.S. and the ROC Marine Corps held a joint amphibious warfare exercise known as "Marine Roar" in September 1958, during the Second Taiwan Strait Crisis.

The crisis began when the ROC-controlled Kinmen Islands off the coast of Fujian Province were attacked by Communist artillery fire from August 23, 1958. The ROC Marine Corps' LVT units were used to deliver supplies to the population of the islands, starting on September 10. Over the course of three months, the marines continued bringing supplies to the Kinmen Islands under Chinese Communist artillery fire, and helped prevent the takeover of the islands by the PRC. For this they were awarded a banner by President Chiang Kai-shek.

In January 1955, the ROCMC 1st Marine Division was reestablished by combining an Army division with one of the two Marine brigades. In 1956 General Luo Youlun became the commandant of the ROCMC. He made an effort to establish standardized Marine uniforms, a flag, and an officer training program, and also made "Forever Loyal" the motto of the Marine Corps. Up until that point, the Marines had used Army and Navy uniforms. In 1966 the 2nd Marine Division was created by combining the remaining Marine brigade with an Army division. After this, the ROCMC had 37,543 personnel. In 1975 the 1st and 2nd Marine Divisions were briefly re-designated the 36th and 54th, respectively, and then they became 66th and 99th Marine Divisions in 1976. Another division, the 77th Marine Division, was created from a former training base in 1979. The 77th Division was short lived, being disbanded in 1984. In 1986, the Marine Corps School was merged with the Marine Corps NCO School.

During the Vietnam War, in 1966 the U.S. Military Assistance Command, Vietnam, considered deploying an ROC Marine brigade to assist the South Vietnamese forces, but this was not implemented for political reasons. The ROC later deployed other troops to Vietnam.

In 1950, the Amphibious Reconnaissance and Patrol Unit, tasked with collecting intelligence for the senior command through amphibious operations, was established as a recon detachment with each of the two Marine Brigade headquarters, having 20 members per detachment. They received specialized amphibious recon training. In 1955, when the 2nd Marine Brigade was expanded into the 1st Marine Division of the ROCMC, its detachment was upgraded to an amphibious reconnaissance company attached to the division HQ battalion. In 1966 the 2nd Marine Division was created, and a second amphibious recon company was also made. In 1969 the companies were increased to battalion size. In 1996 they were merged as the 105th Amphibious Reconnaissance and Patrol Battalion under the Marine Corps Headquarters, and a recon company was established in each division.

In 1997, the 66th Marine Division's recon company was combined with the 105th Battalion to form the Amphibious Reconnaissance and Patrol Unit. In 2001 the 99th Marine Division's recon company joined the unit as well. In 2005 the ROC Navy's Underwater Demolition Team (equivalent of the U.S. Navy SEALs) was combined with the ARP.

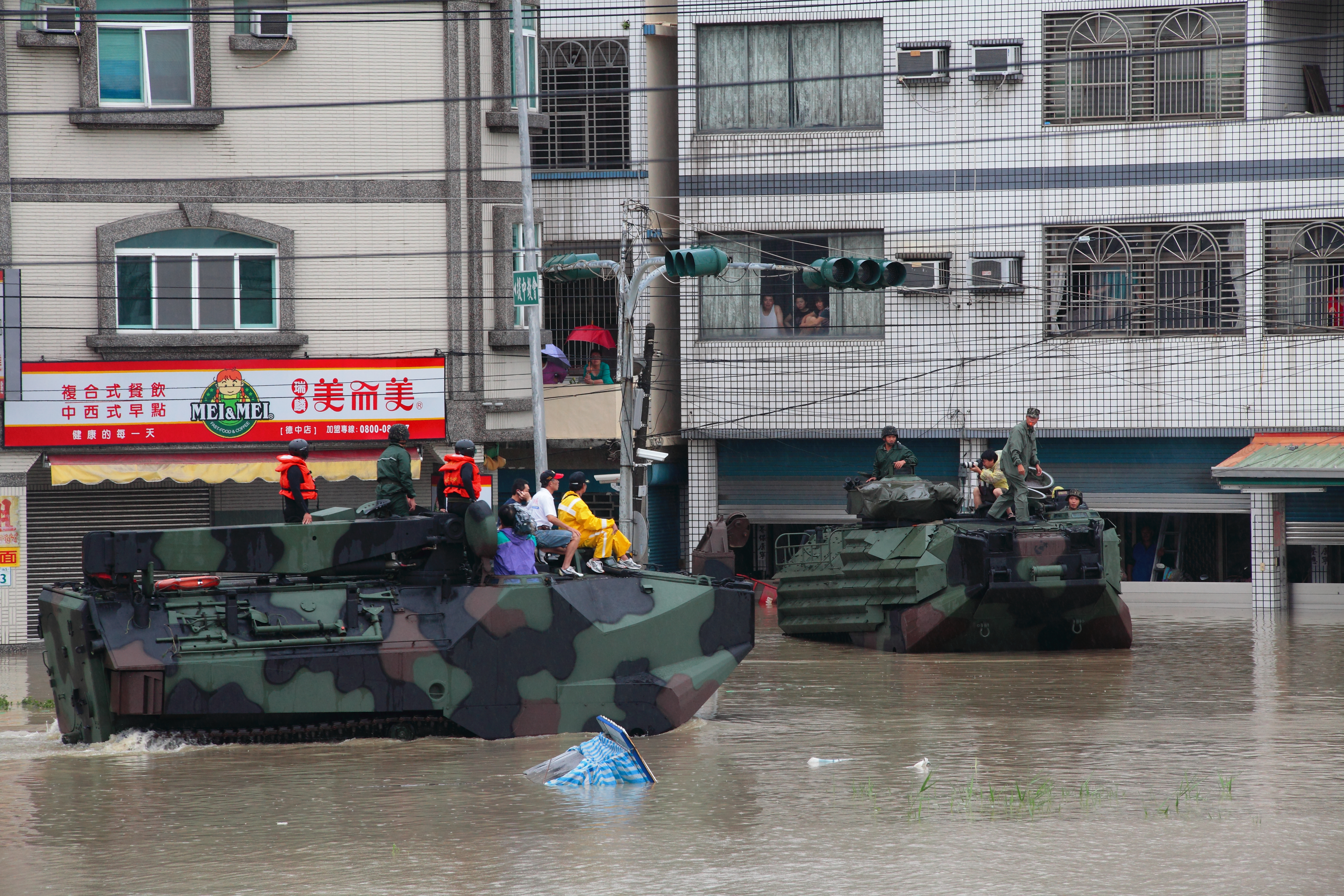
ROCMC amphibious assault vehicles assisting people after Typhoon Fanapi in 2010.

In 1997 the government decided to downsize the military, including the Marine Corps. As of January 1998, around the start of the ROC government's military reduction plan, the Marine Corps consisted of the 66th and 99th Marine Divisions, the Amphibious Reconnaissance and Patrol Unit, the Landing Vehicle Group, the 652nd Regiment, the recruit training center, the Marine Corps School, the headquarters battalion, communications battalion, guard battalion, and three garrison commands in the ROC-administered islands (Wuqiu, Dongsha, and Nansha), with a total of 22,247 personnel. The two divisions were reorganized as the 66th and 99th Marine Brigades. Several units from the former 66th Division were used to organize the Marine Base Guard Brigade, which became the 77th Marine Brigade in 2005. Also in 2005, the Marine Corps Headquarters became the Marine Corps Command. In 2013, the 77th Marine Brigade was disbanded, and some of its units were reorganized as an Air Defense Group. During the administration of President Ma Ying-jeou, the Corps was reduced from 16,000 to 9,000 marines, and in 2014 there was a proposal to disband it altogether.

Over the decades, the mission of the ROCMC changed from leading an invasion of the Mainland to defending Taiwan and its offshore islands, especially by disrupting PRC amphibious operations. Because of Taiwan's lack of relations with foreign militaries since 1979, in the 21st century the ROCMC remains a heavily mechanized force that is not very mobile, like the United States Marine Corps of the late 1970s, before the USMC placed more emphasis on maneuver warfare and started using the marine air–ground task force. The ROCMC does not have its own aviation. Despite this, the Marine Corps is capable of reinforcing offshore islands and serving in the role of power projection.

In 2017, the "Marine Roar" annual training exercise between the ROCMC and the USMC was revived. It took place from 1958 until being suspended in 1979, when the U.S. ended its diplomatic relations with the ROC. Since 2017 the assistance that Taiwan's armed forces have been getting from the U.S. has increased. In 2020 the annual month long training exercise held by the ROC Marine Corps with members of the U.S. Marine Raider Regiment was conducted publicly for the first time since 1979.

Also in 2020, Taiwanese troops from the 99th Marine Brigade were deployed to Pratas Island (Dongsha) to support the Coast Guard there as reports came out that the People's Liberation Army Navy was planning war games in the region simulating the amphibious invasion of an island. In 2021, marines from the 99th Brigade traveled to Guam where they participated in annual training with the U.S. Marine Corps.

In 2023, the 99th Marine Brigade was part of the "Evergreen" military drill with the 269th Mechanized Brigade of the Republic of China Army (ROCA), supervised by the 10th Army Corps, to simulate an invading force while the Army troops were on the defensive.

== Equipment ==
The ROC Marine Corps has 100 main battle tanks (M60A3) and 90 amphibious assault vehicles of different types, as of 2025.

In the 1990s, the Marine Corps began the process of acquiring more modern AAV7 vehicles from the United States, receiving the first ones in 2006.

| Type | Make/Model | Origin | Ref |
|---|---|---|---|
| Main battle tank | M60A3 TTS | United States | |
| Armoured personnel carrier | AAV-P7A1 amphibious assault vehicles | United States | |
| Tank destroyer | CM-25 AFV(CM-21 with 1 x TOW launcher) | Republic of China | |
| Armoured fighting vehicles | CM-24 | Republic of China | modified CM-21 ammo carrier |
| Light utility vehicle | M998 | United States | |
| Howitzer | M101 howitzer | United States | |
| Howitzer | M109 howitzer | United States | |
| Anti-tank missile | BGM-71 TOW-2A/B | United States | |
| Anti-tank missile | MK-153 SMAW Mod 1 | United States | |
| Anti-Tank missile | FGM-148 Javelin Anti-Tank Guided Missile | United States | |
| Anti-tank rocket | Kestrel (rocket launcher) | Republic of China | |
| Surface to air missile | Stinger DMS(Dual Mount Stinger) | United States | |
| Semi-automatic pistol | T75 pistol | Republic of China | |
| Semi-automatic pistol | T75K3 pistol | Republic of China | |
| Semi-automatic pistol | P226 MK25 | Germany | |
| rifle | Type 57 | Republic of China | |
| Assault rifle | T65K2 assault rifle | Republic of China | |
| Assault rifle | T91 combat rifle | Republic of China | |
| Assault rifle | M4A1 rifle | United States | |
| Squad Automatic Weapon | T75 squad machine gun | Republic of China | |
| Sniper Rifle | SSG-2000 | Switzerland | |
| Sniper Rifle | T93 | Republic of China | |
| Automated grenade launcher | Mk 19 grenade launcher | United States | |
| Autocannon | T-75 cannon 20mm | Republic of China | |
| Tactical drone | NCSIST Cardinal II | Republic of China | |
| Fast assault boat | M109 | Republic of China | |

=== Equipment gallery ===
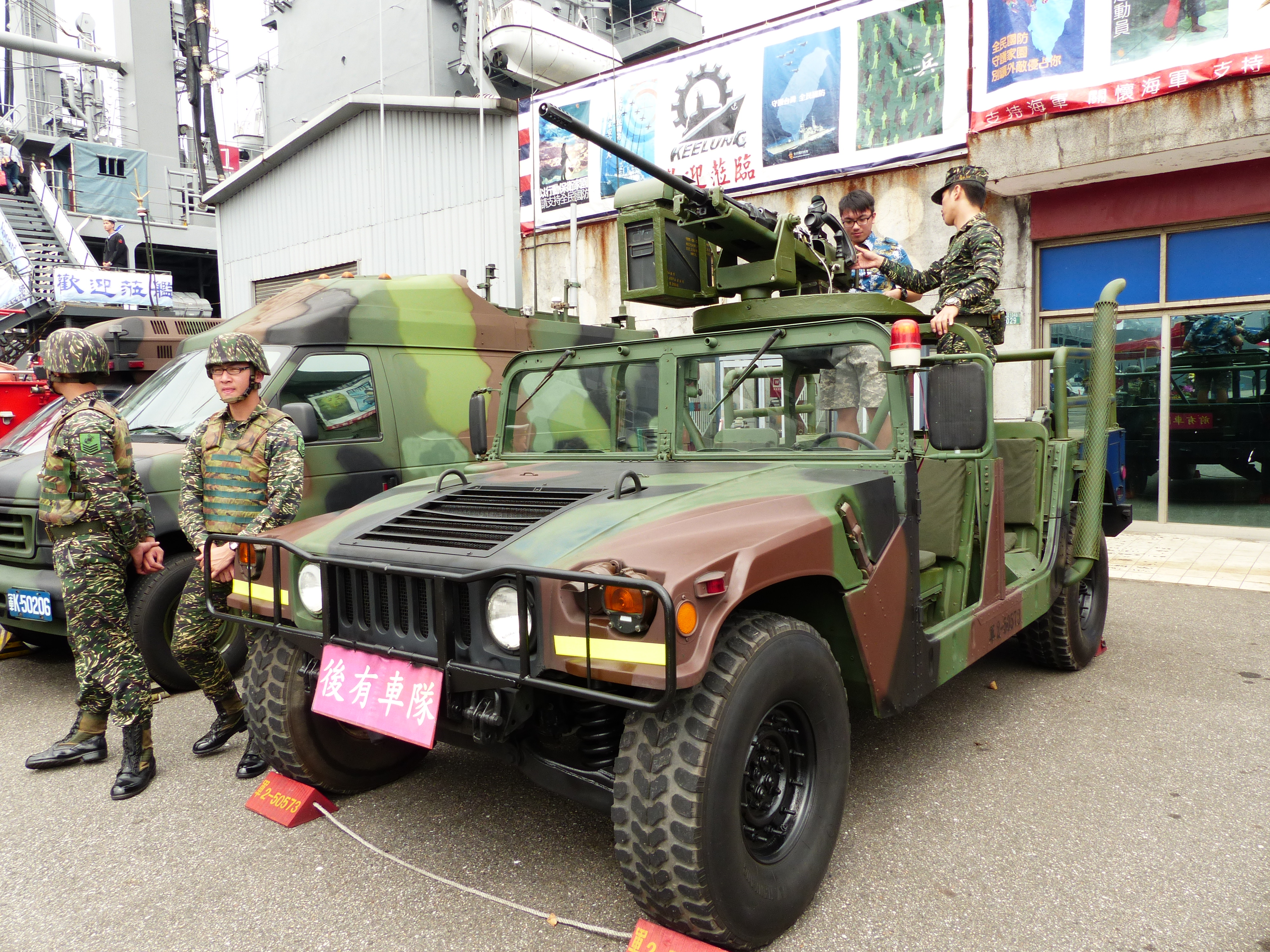
ROCMC Humvee Carried T-75M 20mm Cannon Display at Keelung Naval Pier

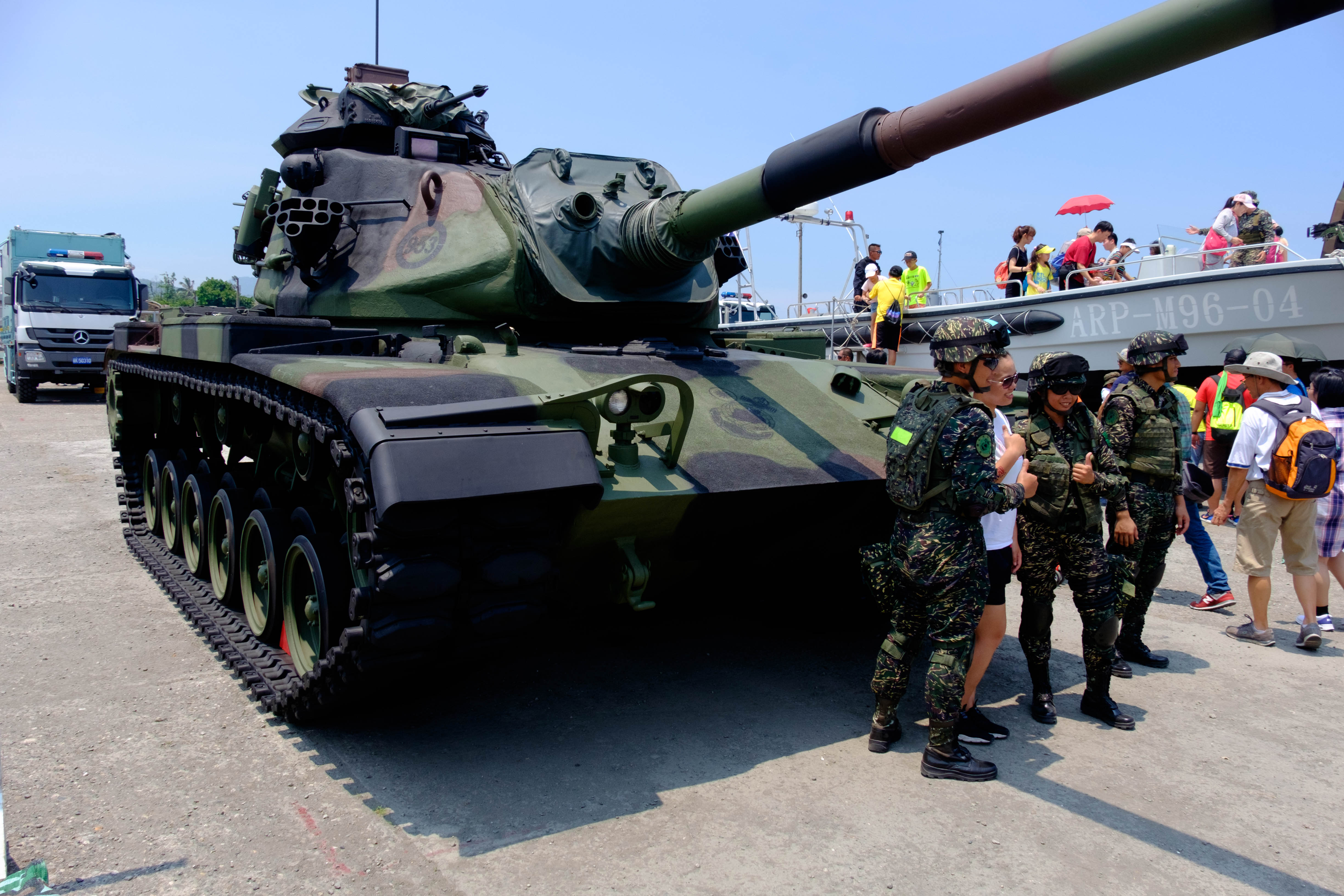
ROCMC M60A3 TTS Display at Navy Fleet Command Ground

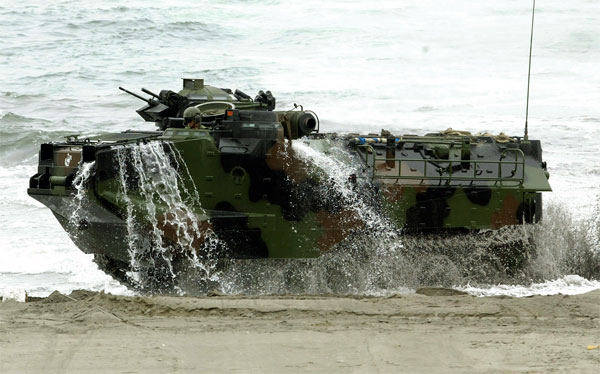
AAV7

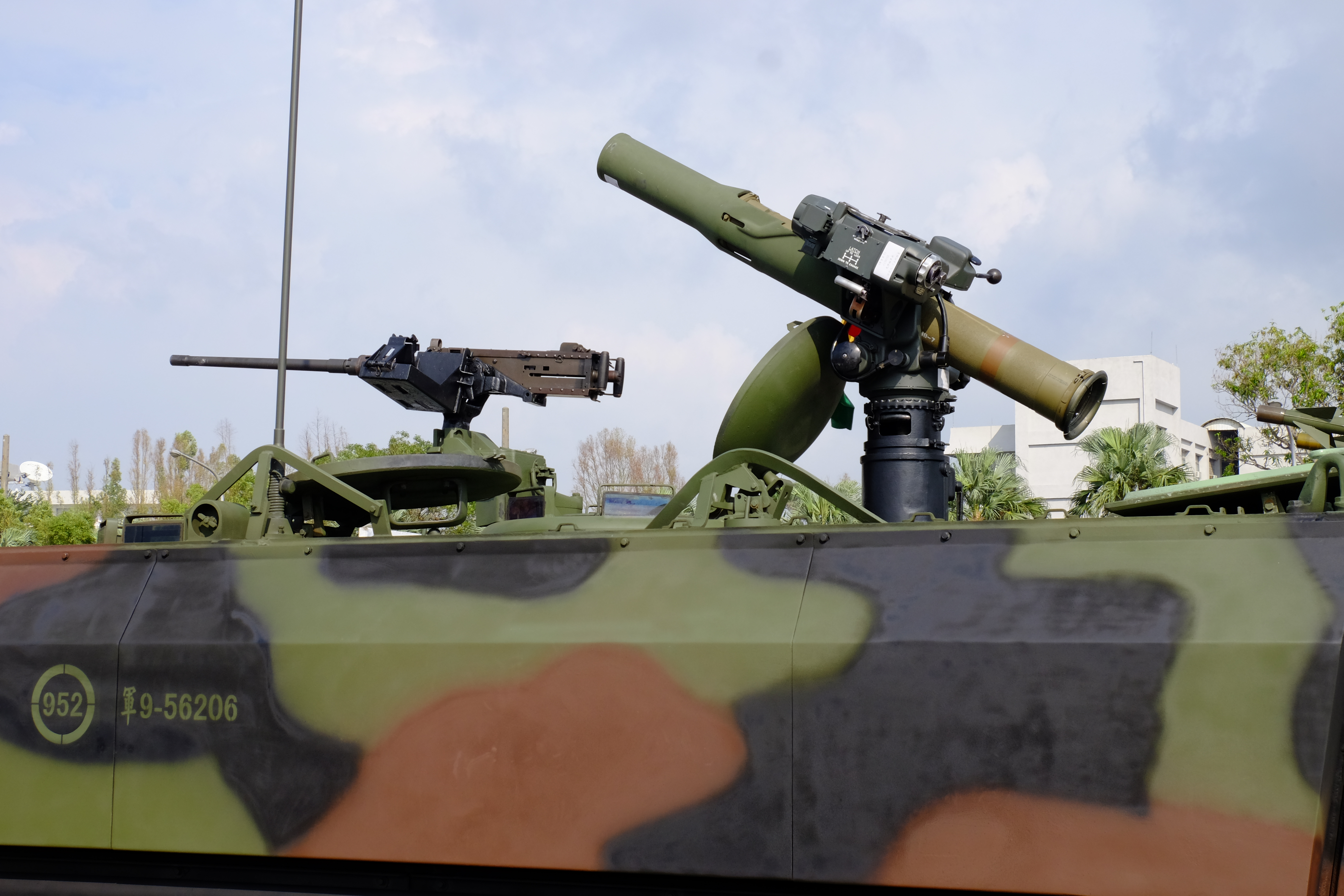
BGM-71 TOW and M2 machine gun on ROCMC CM-25

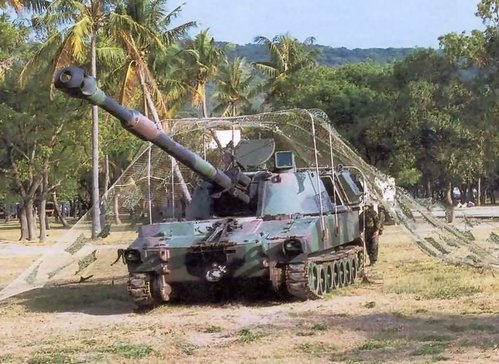
M109A2-155

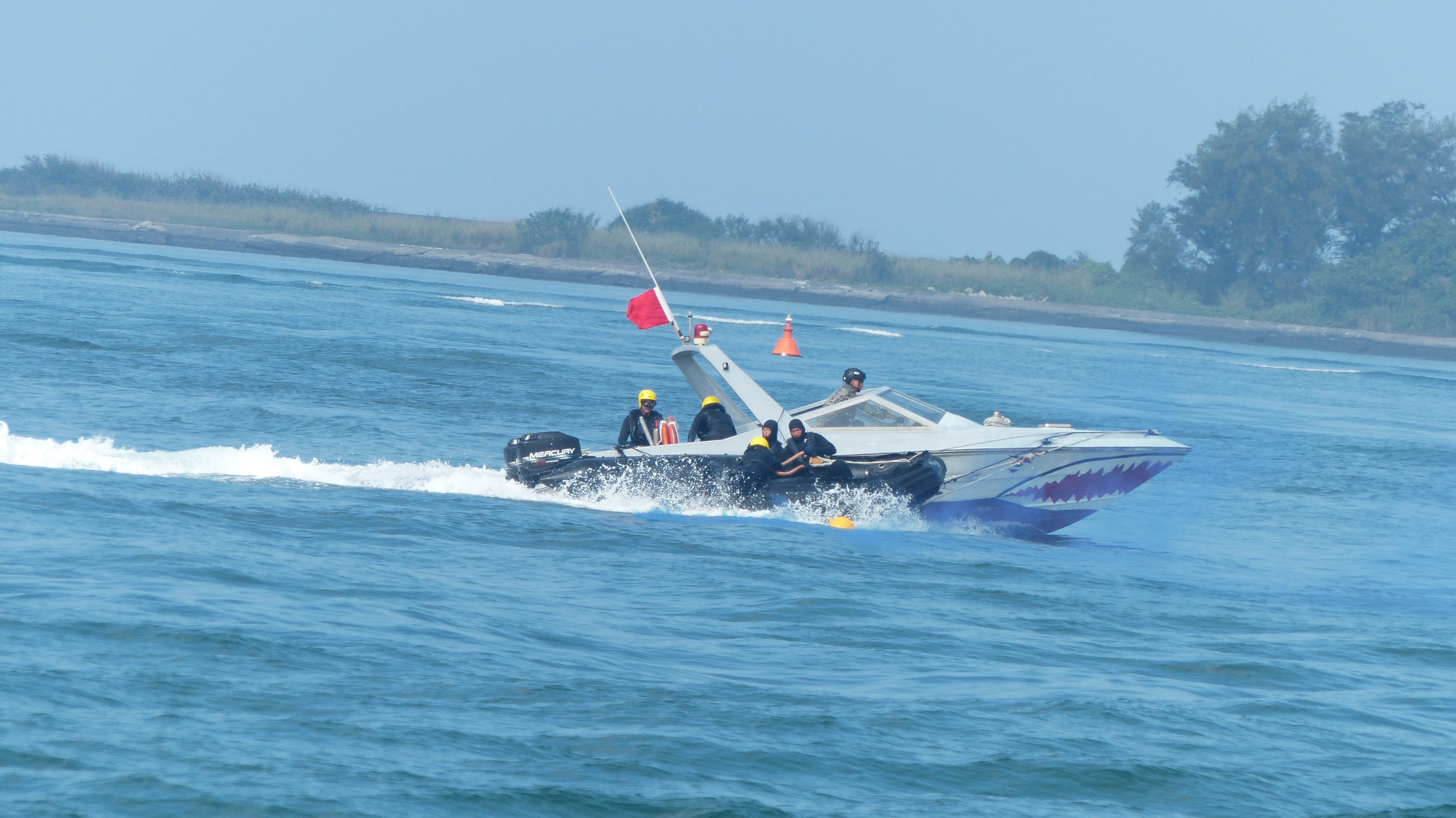
ROCMC M8 Motor Boat catching divers in sea

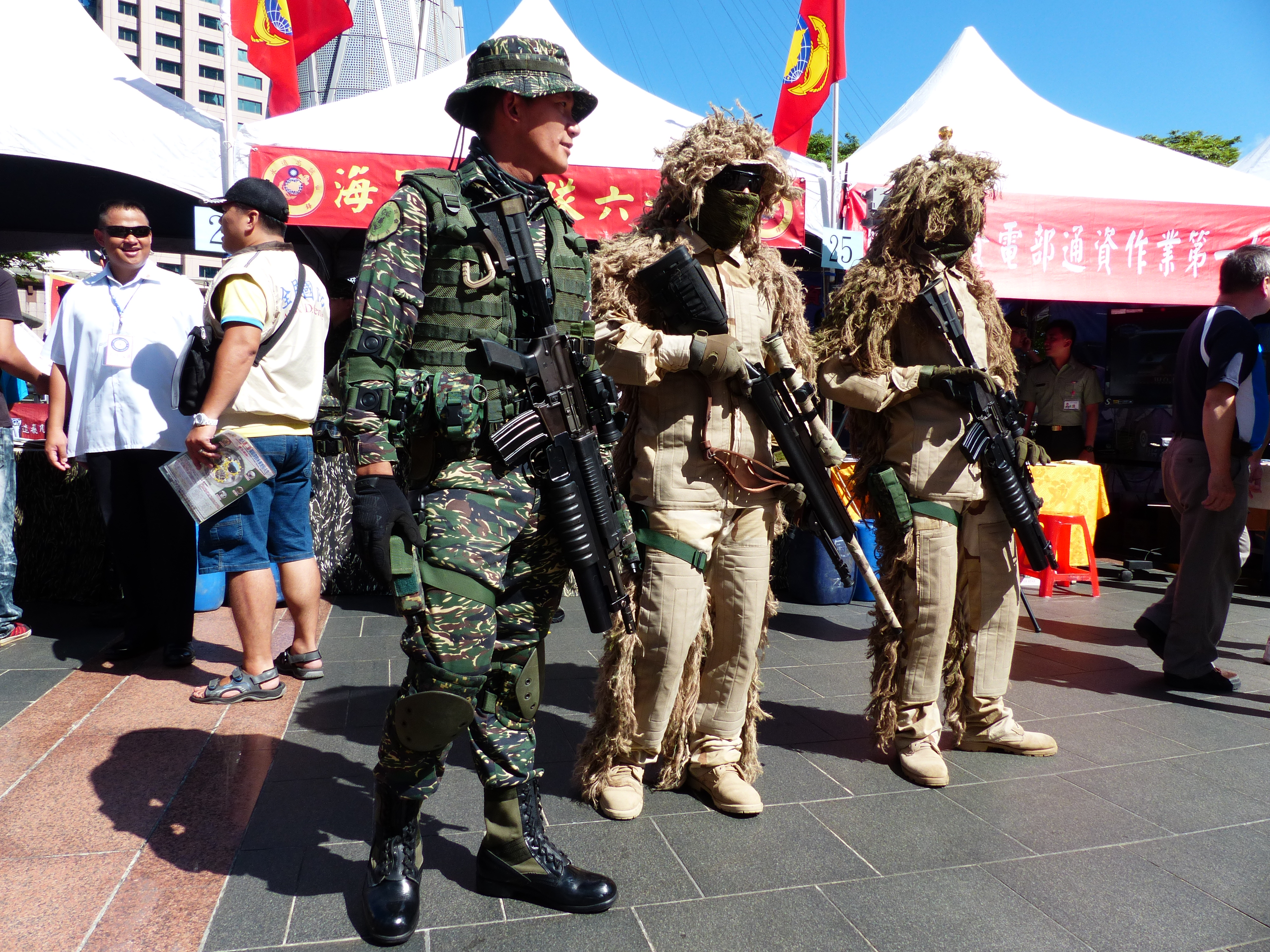
ROCMC Special Forces Team standing behind 66th Brigade Recruitment Booth

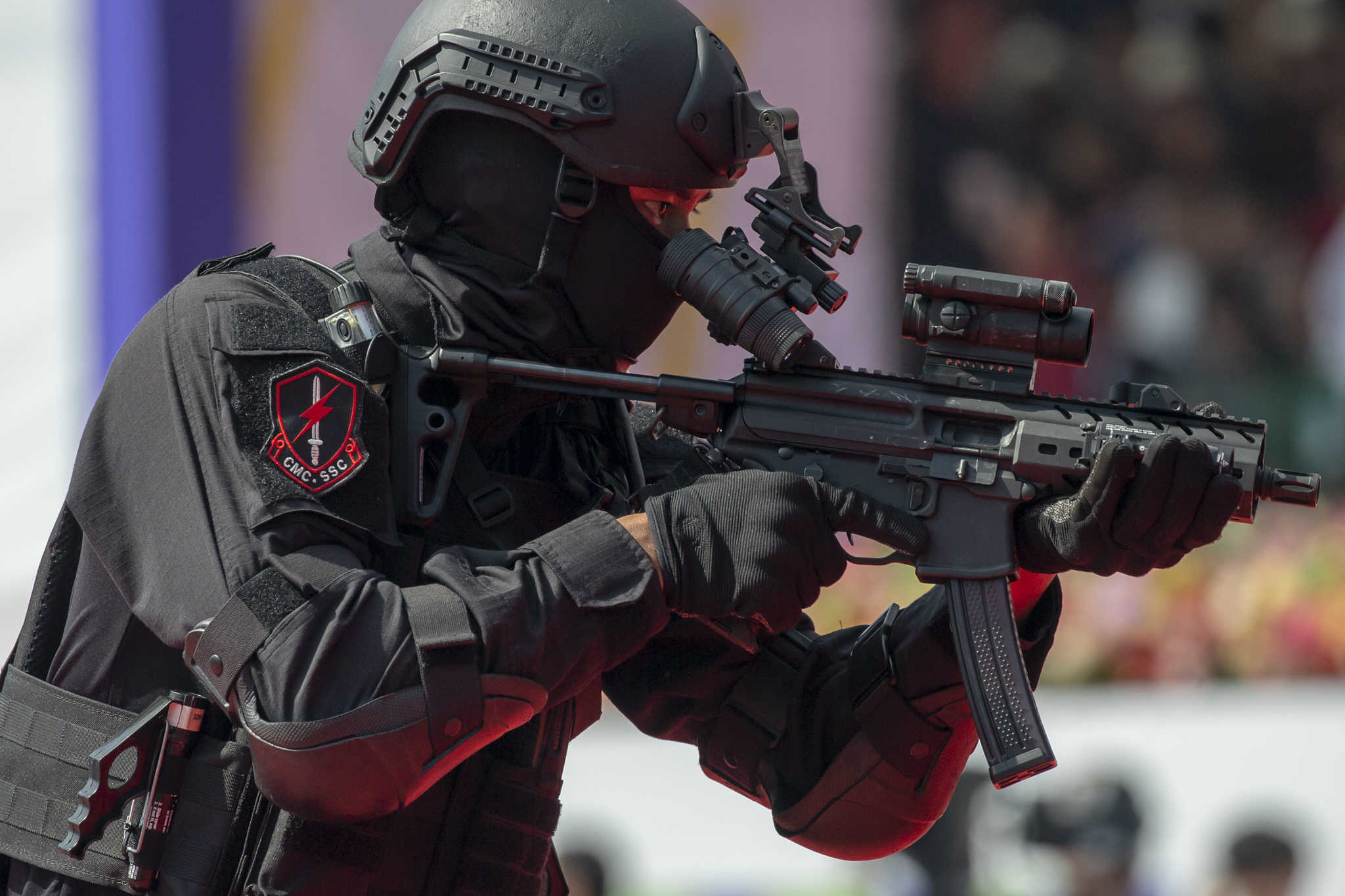
ROC Marine Corps Special Service Company Operator with SIG MPX

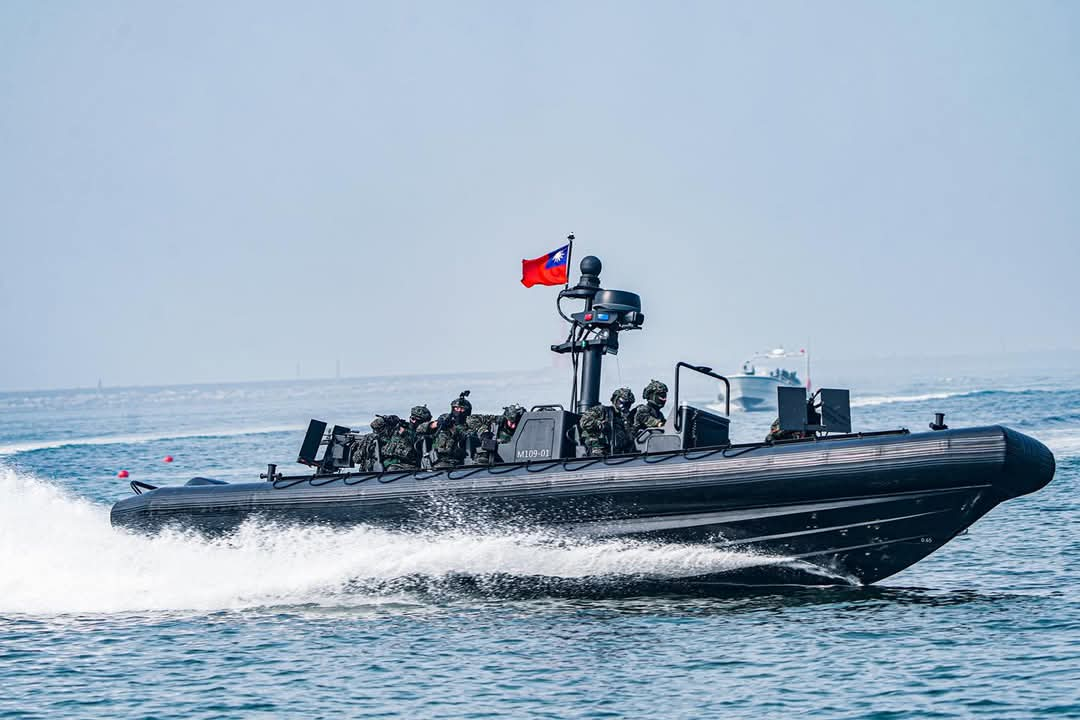
M109 assault boat in Taiwanese military service

== Personnel ==
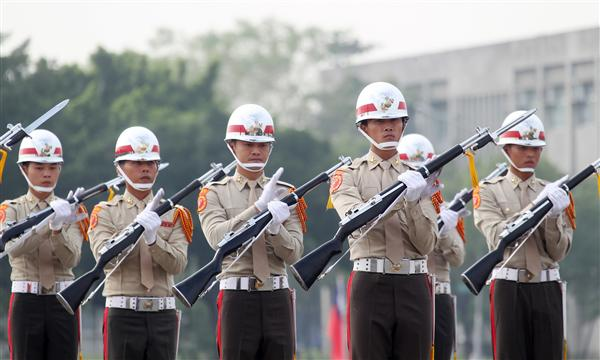
Marine Honor Guards.

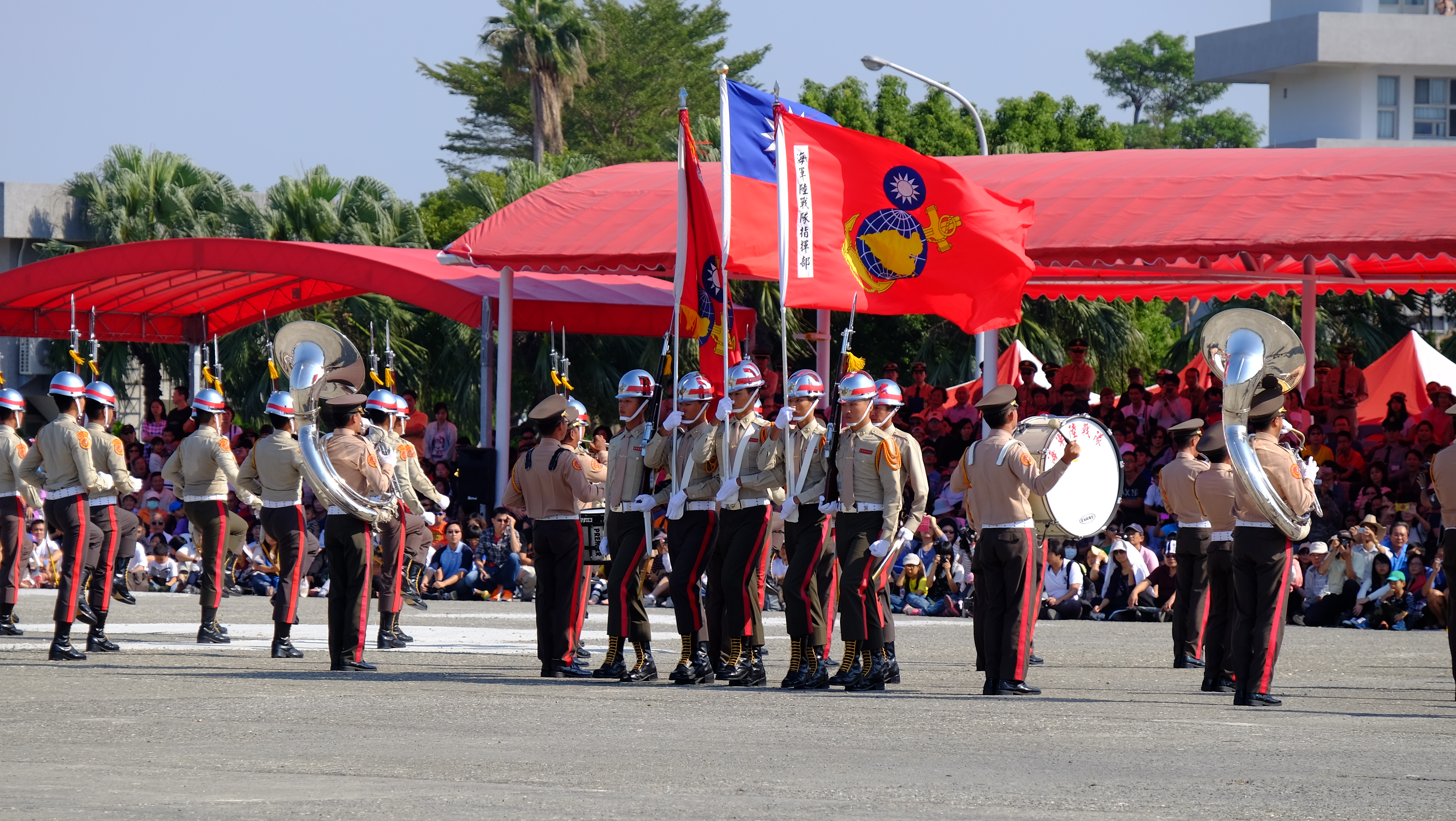
Marine Corps Band.

The ROC Marine Corps has developed a strong ethos and a high level of professionalism. In the Marine Corps, it is considered that the title of Marine is held for life. Like other branches of Taiwan's Armed Forces, it includes conscripts performing the mandatory national service (which was extended from four months to twelve starting in 2024), though the Marine Corps receives less conscripts than any other branch.

Basic training for enlisted marines is eight weeks. Marine officers and non-commissioned officers have to attend the Marine Corps School.

=== Ranks ===
==== Commissioned officer ranks ====
The rank insignia of commissioned officers.

| Rank group | General / flag officers | | | Senior officers | | | Junior officers |
|---|---|---|---|---|---|---|---|---|---|
| Republic of China Marine Corps |
| Republic of China Marine Corps | 二級上將; Èrjí shàngjiàng | 中將; Zhōngjiàng | 少將; Shàojiàng | 上校; Shàngxiào | 中校; Zhōngxiào | 少校; Shàoxiào | 上尉; Shàngwèi | 中尉; Zhōngwèi | 少尉; Shàowèi |

==== Other ranks ====
The rank insignia of non-commissioned officers and enlisted personnel.

| Rank group | Senior NCOs | | | | | Junior NCOs | | Enlisted |
|---|---|---|---|---|---|---|---|---|---|
| Republic of China Marine Corps |
| Republic of China Marine Corps | 一等士官長; Yīděng shìguānzhǎng | 二等士官長; Èrděng shìguānzhǎng | 三等士官長; Sānděng shìguānzhǎng | 上士; Shàngshì | 中士; Zhōngshì | 下士; Xiàshì | 上等兵; Shàngděngbīng | 一等兵; Yīděngbīng | 二等兵; Èrděngbīng |

=== Commanders ===
| Order | Image | Name | Rank | In office | Notes |
Commanders of the Marine Corps
| 1 | | Yang Houcai | Major general | September 16, 1947 – July 31, 1950 | |
| 2 | | Zhou Yuhuan | Major general | August 1, 1950 – March 1, 1955 | |
| 3 | | Tang Shouzhi | Lieutenant general | March 16, 1955 – March 31, 1957 | |
| 4 | | Luo Youlun | Lieutenant general | April 1, 1957 – December 31, 1960 | |
| 5 | | Zheng Weiyuan | Lieutenant general | January 1, 1961 – August 31, 1964 | |
| 6 | | Yu Haozhang | Lieutenant general | September 1, 1964 － January 10, 1968 | |
| 7 | | Yuan Guozheng | Lieutenant general | January 11, 1968 － March 15, 1971 | |
| 8 | 无框 | He Enting | Lieutenant general | March 16, 1971 －June 15, 1975 | |
| 9 | | Kong Lingsheng | Lieutenant general | June 16, 1975 － December 10, 1976 | |
| 10 | | Huang Guangluo | Lieutenant general | December 11, 1976 － November 18, 1977 | |
| 11 | 无框 | Luo Zhang | Lieutenant general | November 18, 1977 － August 31, 1982 | |
| 12 | | Tu Youxin | Lieutenant general | September 1, 1982 – March 1, 1985 | |
| 13 | | Huang Duanxin | Lieutenant general | March 2, 1985 – May 1, 1988 | |
| 14 | | Ma Lusui | Lieutenant general | May 2, 1988 – July 1, 1992 | |
| 15 | | Zheng Guonan | Lieutenant general | July 2, 1992 － December 29, 1995 | |
| 16 | | Gao Wangjue | Lieutenant general | December 30, 1995 － May 31, 1998 | |
| 17 | | Chen Bangzhi | Lieutenant general | June 1, 1998 － August 31, 2000 | |
| 18 | | Ji Linlian | Lieutenant general | September 1, 2000 － May 31, 2004 | |
| 19 | | Xu Taisheng | Lieutenant general | June 1, 2004 – February 28, 2006 | |
Commander of the Marine Corps Command
| 19 | | Xu Taisheng | Lieutenant general | March 1, 2006 － April 15, 2006 | |
| 20 | | Xu Shangwen | Lieutenant general | April 16, 2006 – April 27, 2009 | |
| 21 | | Xia Fuhua | Lieutenant general | April 28, 2009 – October 30, 2011 | |
| 22 | | Pan Jinlong | Lieutenant general | October 30, 2011 － October 19, 2014 | |
| 23 | | Chen Zifeng | Lieutenant general | October 20, 2014 － July 31, 2017 | |
| 24 | | Wang Ruilin | Lieutenant general | August 1, 2017 － July 31, 2022 | |
| 25 | | Ma Qunchao | Lieutenant general | August 1, 2022 － June 30, 2024 | |
| 26 | | Fan Chuan-sheng | Lieutenant general | June 30, 2024 – | |

== Gallery ==
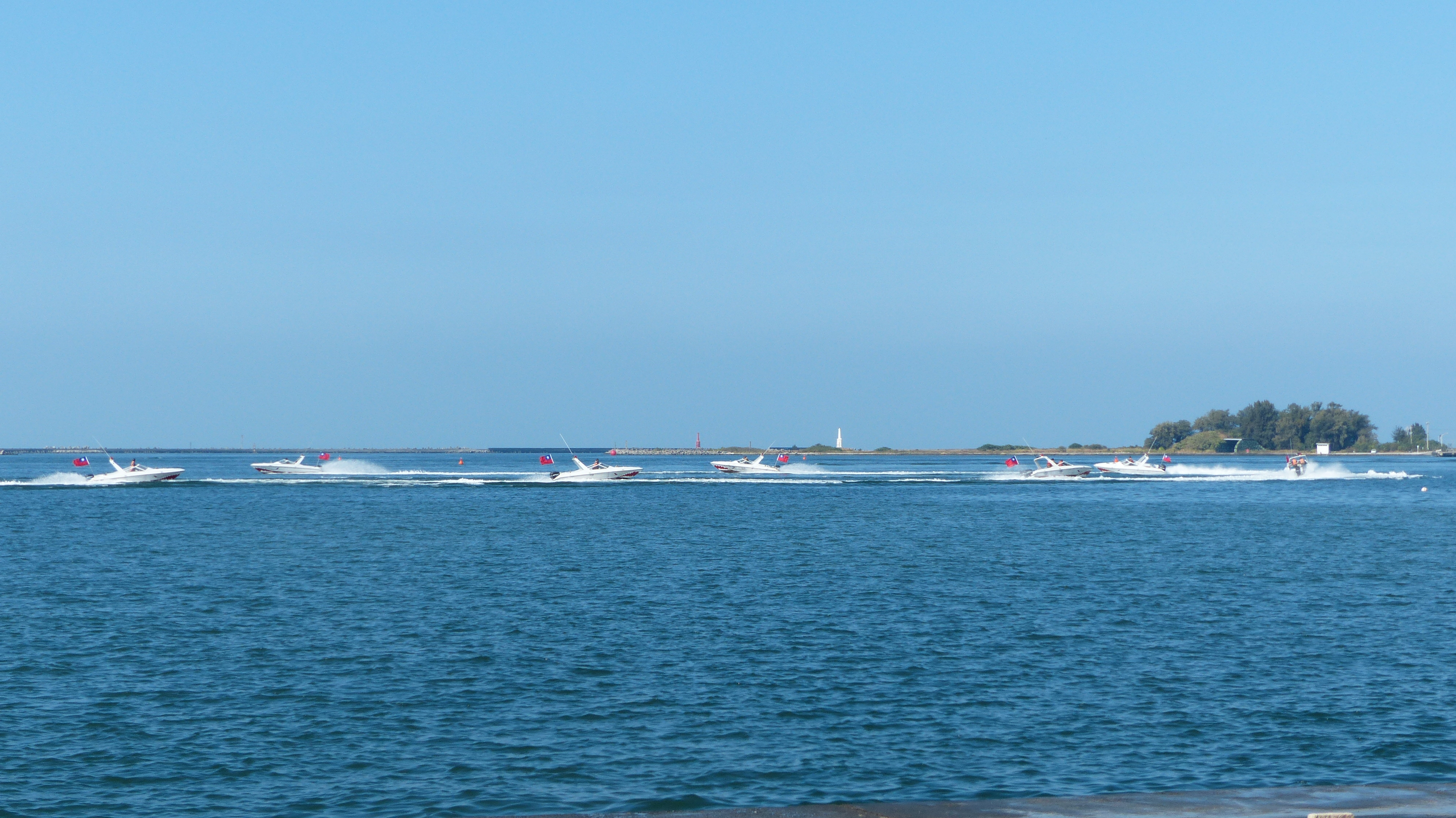
Seven ROCMC M8 motor boats circled around Exercise Water

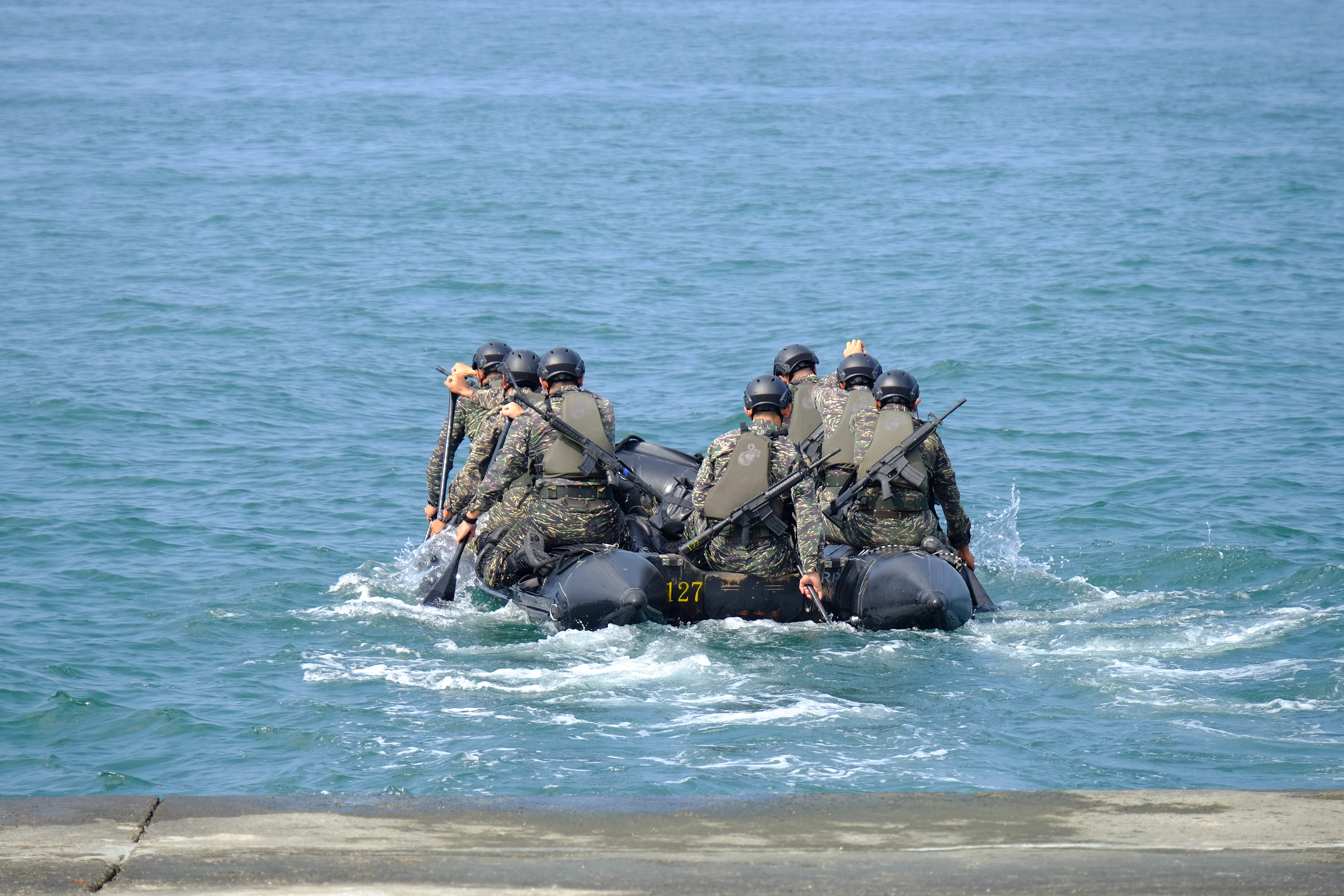
Marines at Zuoying naval pier

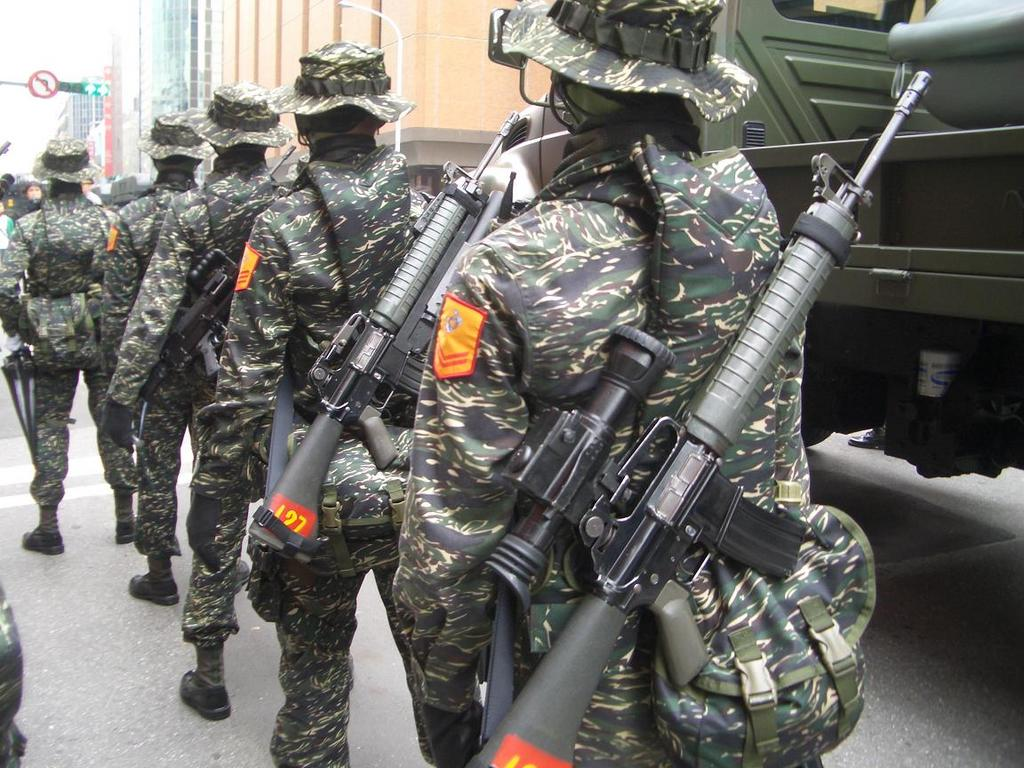
ROC Marine Corps personnel

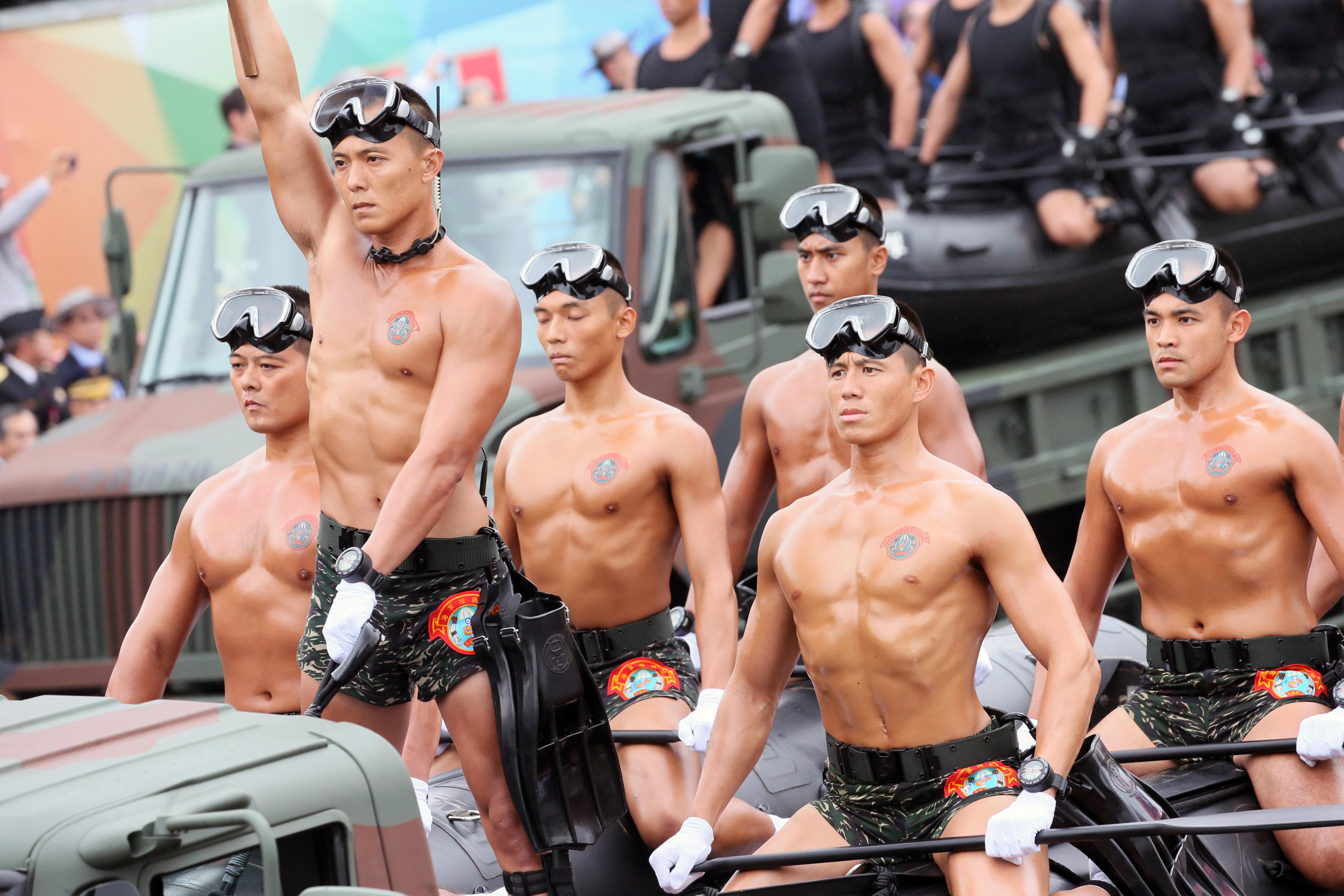
ROC Marine Corps frogmen

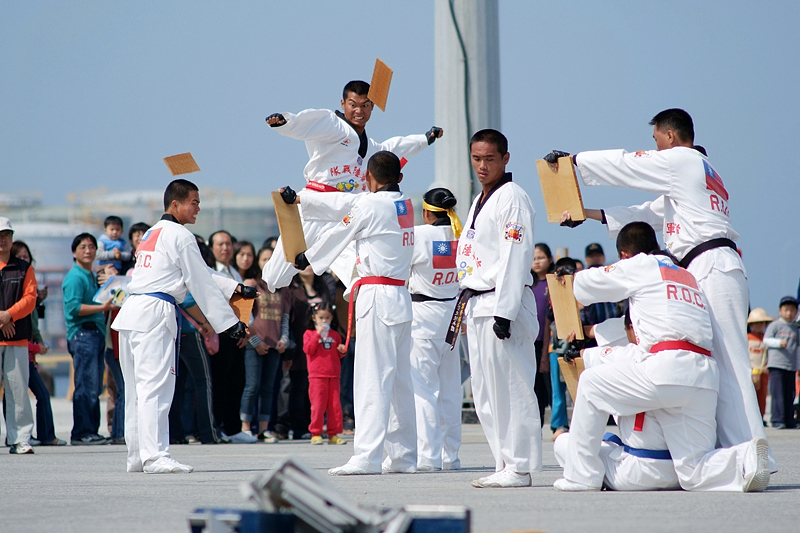
Chikwondo, 2009

== See also ==
- Republic of China Navy
- People's Liberation Army Navy Marine Corps
