= Wuqiu =

Wuqiu (Wuchiu) may refer to -

- Wuqiu Jian or Muqiu Jian (毋丘儉), a general during China's Three Kingdoms period
- Wuqiu, Kinmen (烏坵鄉), Fujian, Republic of China (Taiwan)
