= Daqiu Village =

Coordinates: 24°59′31″N 119°27′08″E

Daqiu Village (Chinese: 大坵村) is located on the western side of the Taiwan Strait, currently serving as an administrative area under the jurisdiction of Wuchiu Township in the Republic of China (Taiwan). It is currently administered by Kinmen County. On the People's Republic of China side, it is designated as Wuchiu Village in Meizhou Town, Xiuyu District, Putian City, Fujian Province.

Surrounded by the sea on all four sides, the village includes the main island of Daqiu and nearby reefs, with a total area of approximately 0.71 square kilometers, slightly larger than the neighboring Xiaofu. The majority of the area falls under the military control zone of the Republic of China.
