= Wuqiu Lighthouse =

Lighthouse in Wuqiu, Kinmen, Taiwan

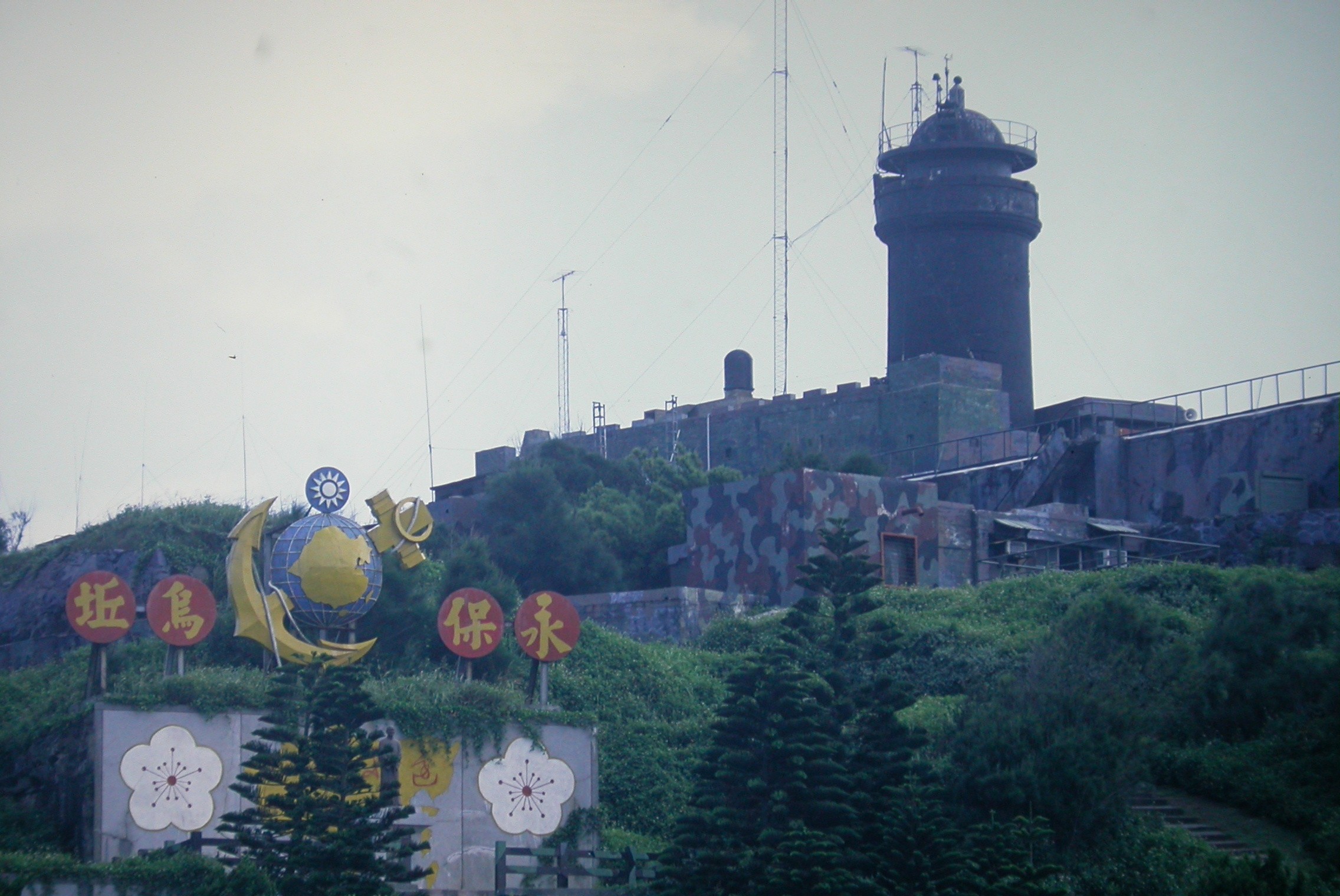
- Wuqiu Lighthouse
- Location: Wuqiu, Kinmen, Taiwan
- Coordinates: 24.992045°N 119.452948°E

Tower
- Constructed: 1874
- Construction: stone tower
- Height: 19.5 meters (64 ft)
- Shape: cylindrical tower with balcony and lantern
- Markings: black tower and lantern
- Operator: Maritime and Port Bureau
- Heritage: list of national monuments of Taiwan

Light
- Deactivated: 1951-2017
- Focal height: 87.2 meters (286 ft)
- Range: 11.3 nautical miles (20.9 km; 13.0 mi)
- Characteristic: Fl W 5s.

The Wuqiu Lighthouse (traditional Chinese: 烏坵嶼燈塔; simplified Chinese: 乌丘屿灯塔; pinyin: Wūqiū Yǔ Dēngtǎ) is a lighthouse in Daqiu Village, Wuqiu Township (Ockseu), Kinmen County (Quemoy), Fujian Province (Fukien), Republic of China (Taiwan).

== History ==
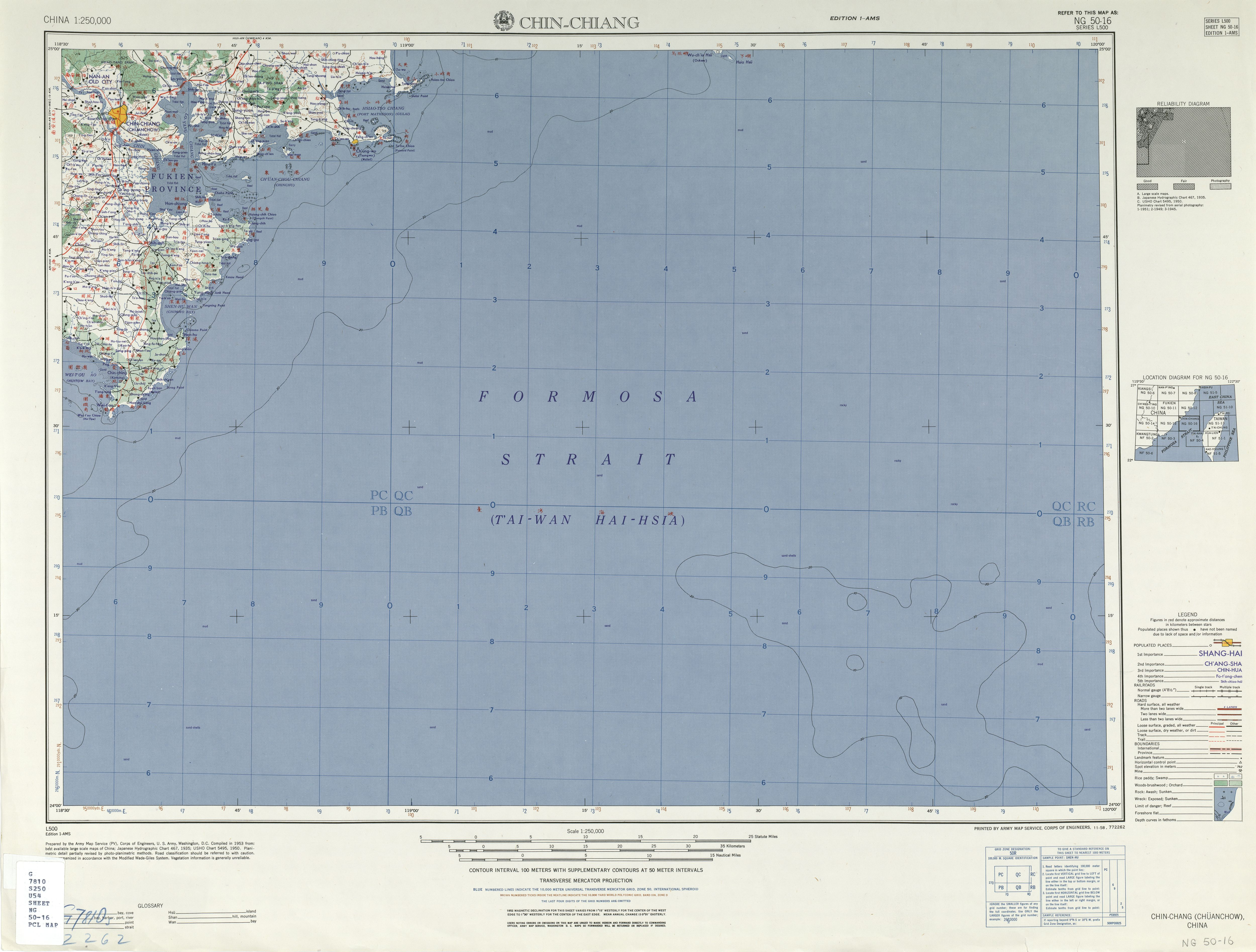
Wuqiu Lighthouse (labeled as 'Light' on Wu-ch'iu Hsü (Ockseu) 烏坵嶼) (1953)

The lighthouse was constructed by the Netherlands in 1874 with engineer David Marr Henderson and deputy engineer John Ropinald to serve as navigation aid for ships sailing between Fuzhou and Xiamen. The lighthouse lost its top structure during World War II and was repaired afterwards to become a lower black lighthouse in 1947. However, the lighthouse became inactive in 1951 as part of military strategy due to the tension with People's Liberation Army. In 1960–1975, works were made to improve the lighthouse, such as concreting the wall, increasing its height, adding house inside the wall and creating a connecting tunnel. In 2001, the lighthouse was officially closed after it was placed under the jurisdiction of the Republic of China Armed Forces. On 23 July 2017, the Maritime and Port Bureau signed an agreement with the armed forces to take over the lighthouse. Currently, the Wuqiu Township government is trying to register the lighthouse to be a national historic site.

== Architecture ==
The lighthouse tower is a cylindrical tower with lantern and gallery. It is located on the highest point of Daqiu Island.

== Technical details ==
This staffed lighthouse focal plane is 87 meters, radiating a white flash every 5 seconds.

== Lightkeepers ==
- 1885 - C.M. Peterson (in charge) and J. Chapman

== See also ==
- List of tourist attractions in Taiwan
- List of lighthouses in Taiwan
- Queenscliff High Light, black lighthouse in Australia
