= Wuqiu, Kinmen =

Wuqiu 烏坵鄕 Ockseu, Wuchiu, Wuciou, Wochiu, Wu-ch'iu
- Rural township
- Wuqiu Township
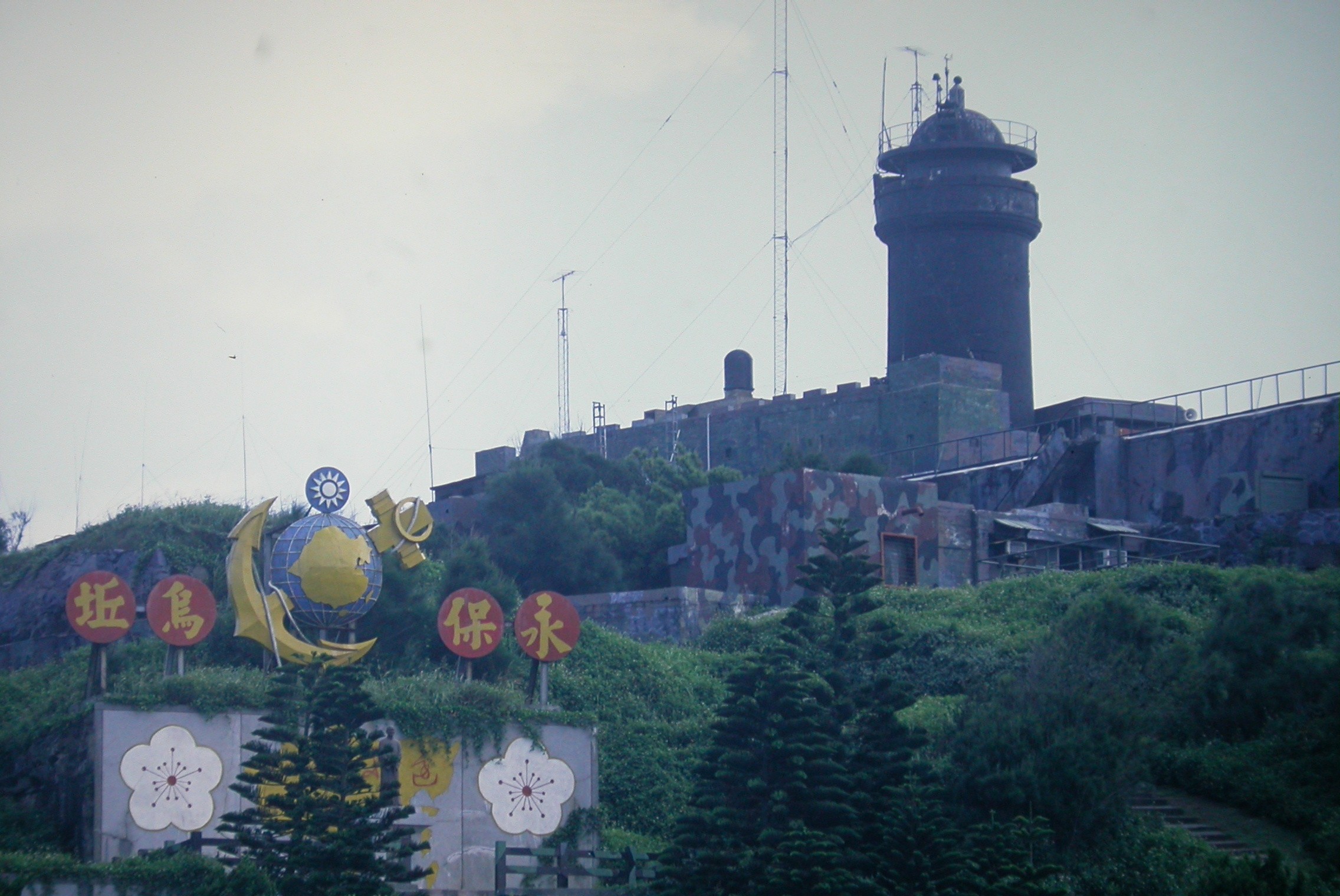
- Wuqiu Lighthouse on Daqiu Island

- 金門縣烏坵鄕公所; Wuqiu Township Office, Kinmen County

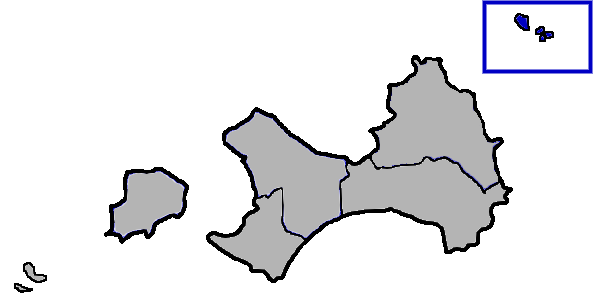
- Wuqiu Township (inset) and the rest of Kinmen County to scale

- Wuqiu Township (upper right box) and the rest of Kinmen County (lower left box) locations
- Coordinates: 24.986°N 119.462°E
- Country: Republic of China (Taiwan)
- Province: Fuchien
- County: Kinmen; Putian (de jure)
- Rural villages: 2

Government
  - Mayor: Tsai Yung-fu (蔡永富)

Area
  - Total: 1.2000 km^{2} (0.4633 sq mi)

Population (February 2023)
  - Total: 666
  - Density: 555/km^{2} (1,440/sq mi)
- Time zone: UTC+8 (National Standard Time)
- Postal code: 896
- Website: Wuqiu.Kinmen.gov.tw (in Chinese)

Wuqiu Township
- Traditional Chinese: 烏坵鄕
- Simplified Chinese: 乌丘乡
- Postal: Ockseu
Transcriptions
Standard Mandarin
- Hanyu Pinyin: Wūqiū Xiāng
- Bopomofo: ㄨ ㄑㄧㄡ ㄒㄧㄤ
- Gwoyeu Romatzyh: Uchiou Shiang
- Wade–Giles: Wu^{1}-chʻiu^{1} Hsiang^{1}
- Tongyong Pinyin: Wuciou Siang
- Yale Romanization: Wūchyōu Syāng
- MPS2: Wūchiōu Shiāng
- IPA: [ú.tɕʰjóʊ ɕjáŋ]
Southern Min
- Hokkien POJ: O͘-khiu-hiong or O͘-khu-hiong
- Tâi-lô: Oo-khiu-hiong or Oo-khu-hiong

Location of Wuqiu

Wuqiu (Wuchiu, Wuciou, Ockseu) (Puxian Min: Ou-chhiu, Hakka: Vû-hiu-hiông) is a rural township of Kinmen County, Taiwan made up of a group of islands in the Taiwan Strait comprising two major islands, Daqiu and Xiaoqiu. Wuqiu Township is nominally de jure part of Futian County, Fuchien of the Republic of China. It is the smallest township in Kinmen County and is located 72 nmi (133 km) northeast of the rest of the county. The township is 73 nmi (135 km) from the Port of Taichung on Taiwan. The closest territory under China (PRC) control is the neighboring Luci Island (Lusi Island), Xiuyu District, Putian, Fujian, which is 9 nmi (17 km) to the north-northwest. Greater Qiu Island is the site of the Wuqiu Lighthouse.

== History ==
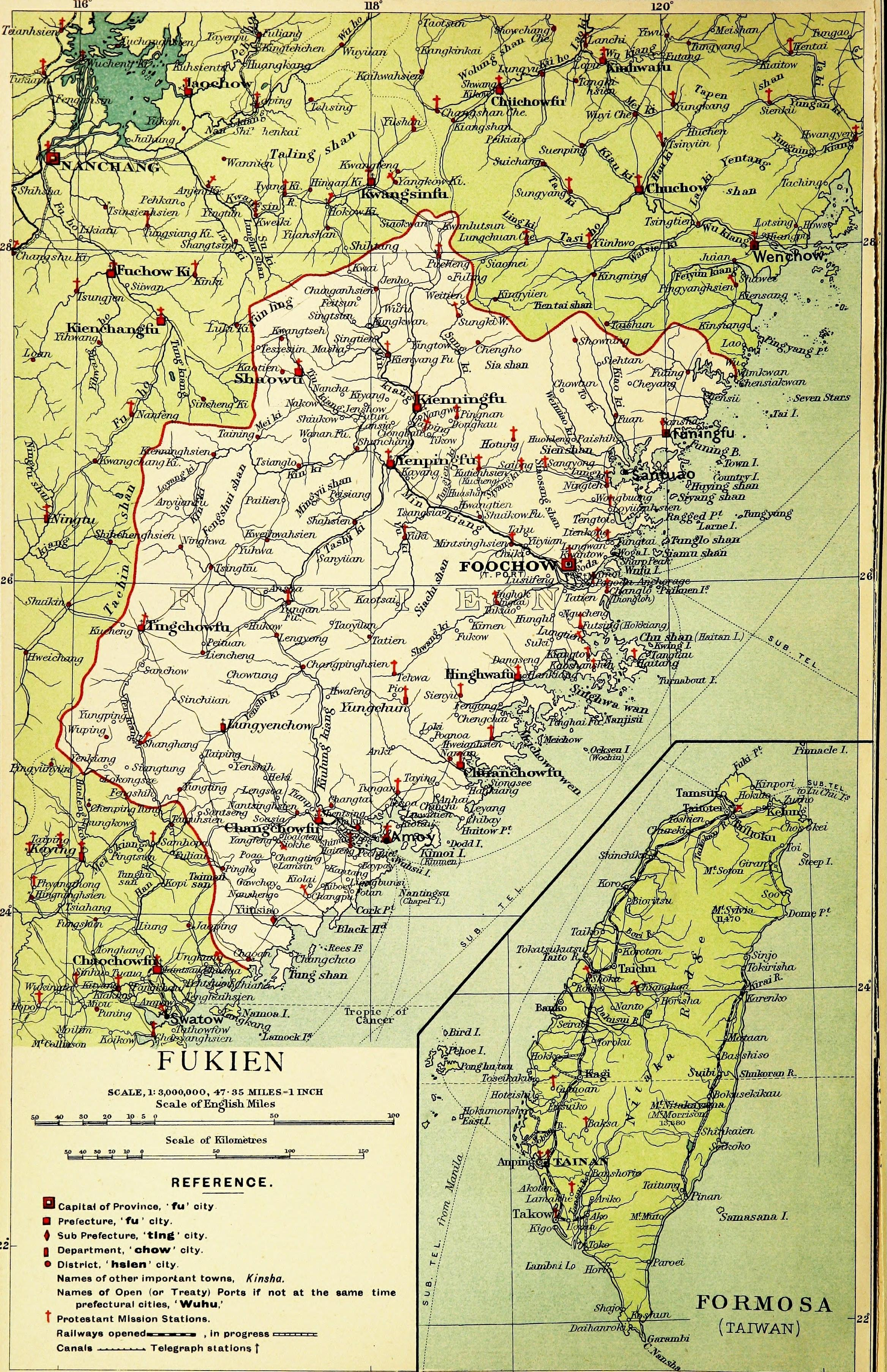
Map including Ockseu I (Wochiu) (1917)

In the early 1400s, Wuqiu was known as a marker on the sailing route between China and the Ryukyu Islands.

As of 1843, a "considerable fishing village" existed in Ockseu (Wuqiu).

The Wuqiu Lighthouse was built in 1874, directed by David Marr Henderson.

In September 1910, the center of a typhoon swept over Niushan Island (Turnabout Island) and Wuqiu (Ockseu) or a few miles to the southeast.

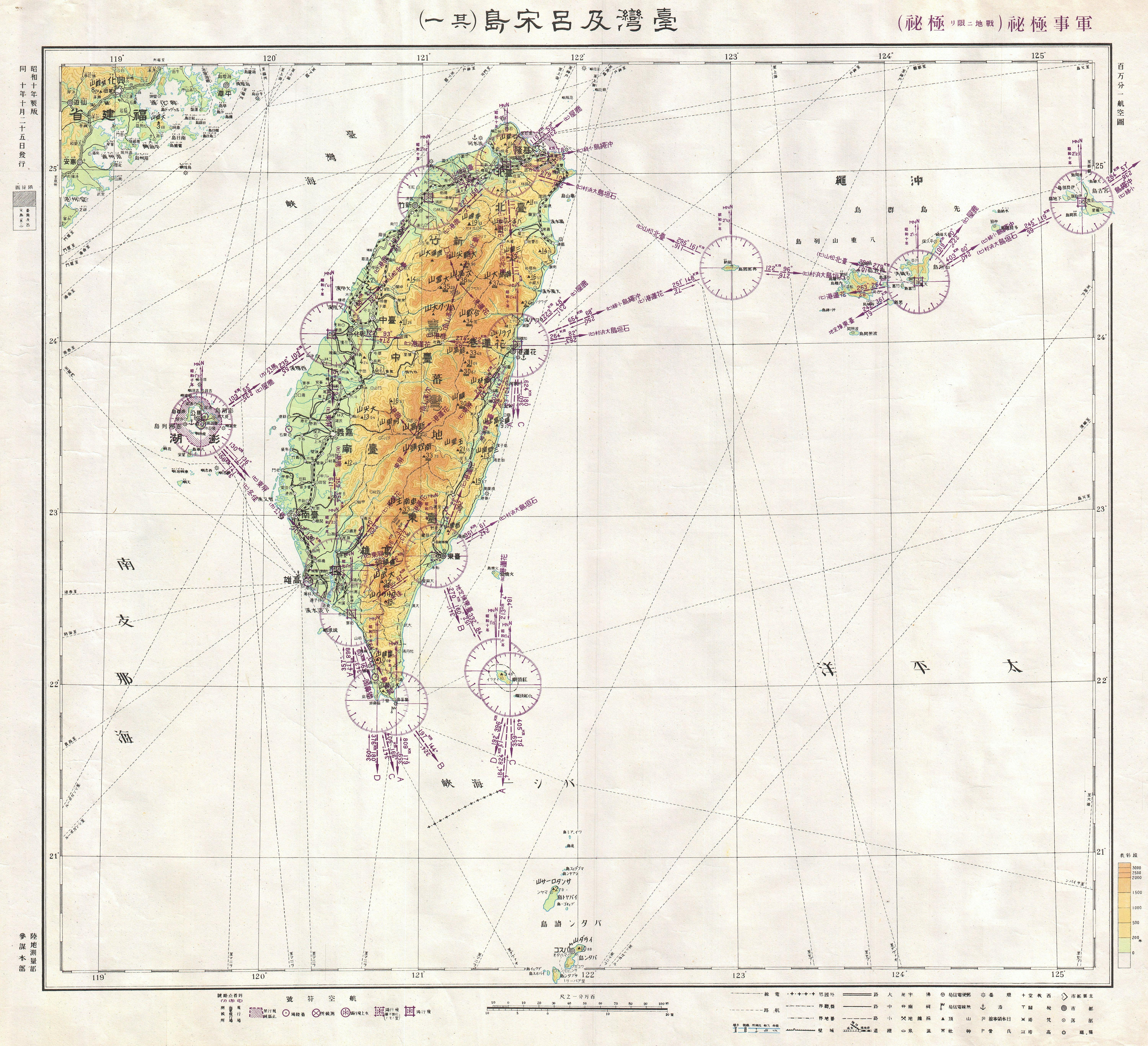
The lighthouse at Wuqiu (烏坵嶼) marked on a 1943 Japanese Aviation Map

Wuqiu Township was originally part of Putian County with many of its residents emigrating from the county. After the end of Chinese Civil War in 1949, Wuqiu became disconnected from Putian. Control of Ockseu and other insular areas was shared between the KMT and anti-Communist guerrillas.

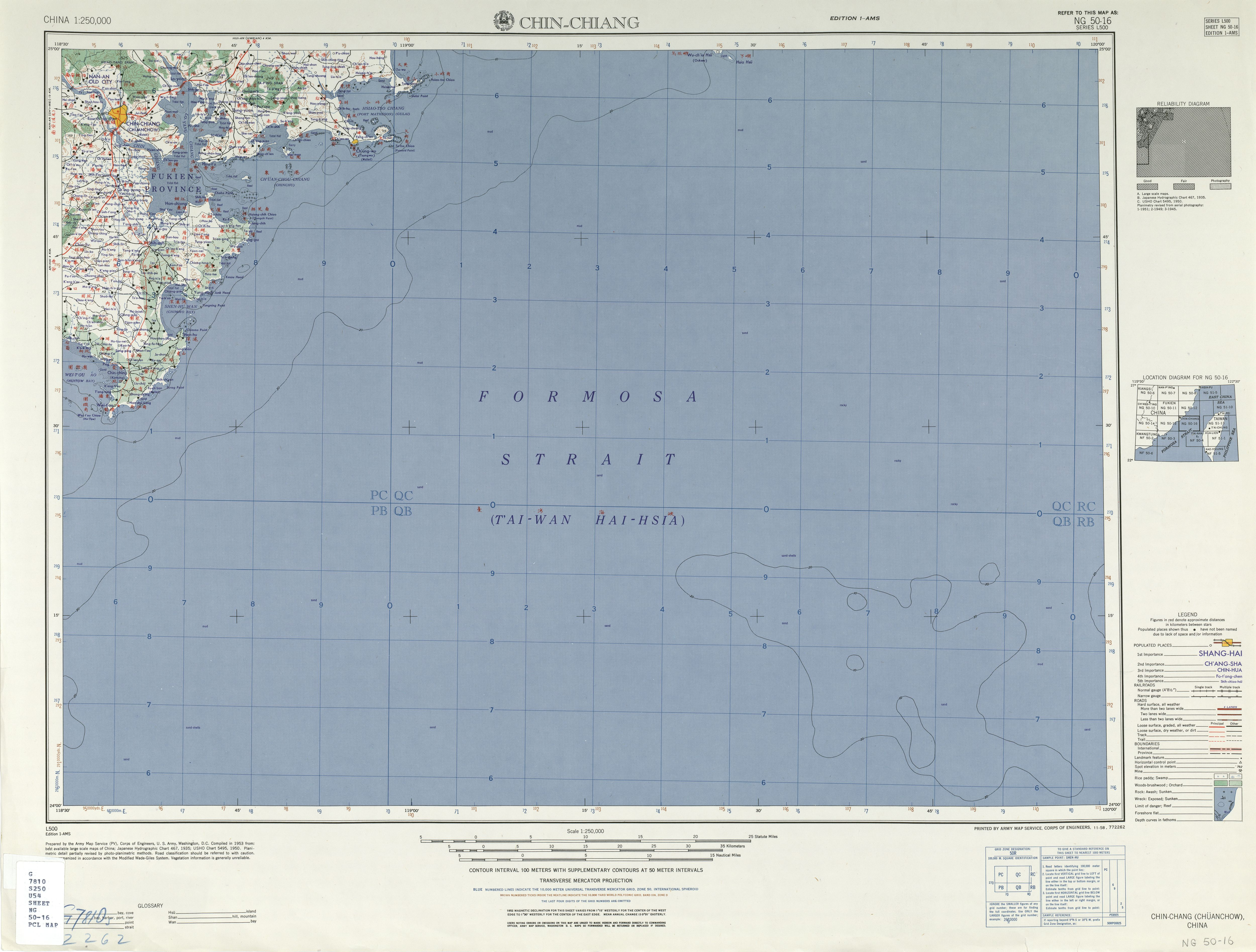
Part of Wuqiu Township (labeled as Wu-ch'iu Hsü (Ockseu) 烏坵嶼 and Hsia Hsü 下嶼) (1953)

In June 1954, the township was provisionally reassigned to Kinmen County.

In 1954, Wuchiu was shelled and attacked by the Chinese Communists on several occasions.

On February 25, 1955, Chinese Communist ships shelled Wuchiu.

On June 21, 1955, Nationalist planes heavily damaged a 40-ton tugboat at Wuchiu.

In February 1956, there were reports that the 480-man guerrilla force on Wuchiu would be evacuated. The Wuchiu Islands were seen as "highly vulnerable to Communist strikes" and "of little military value to the Nationalists."

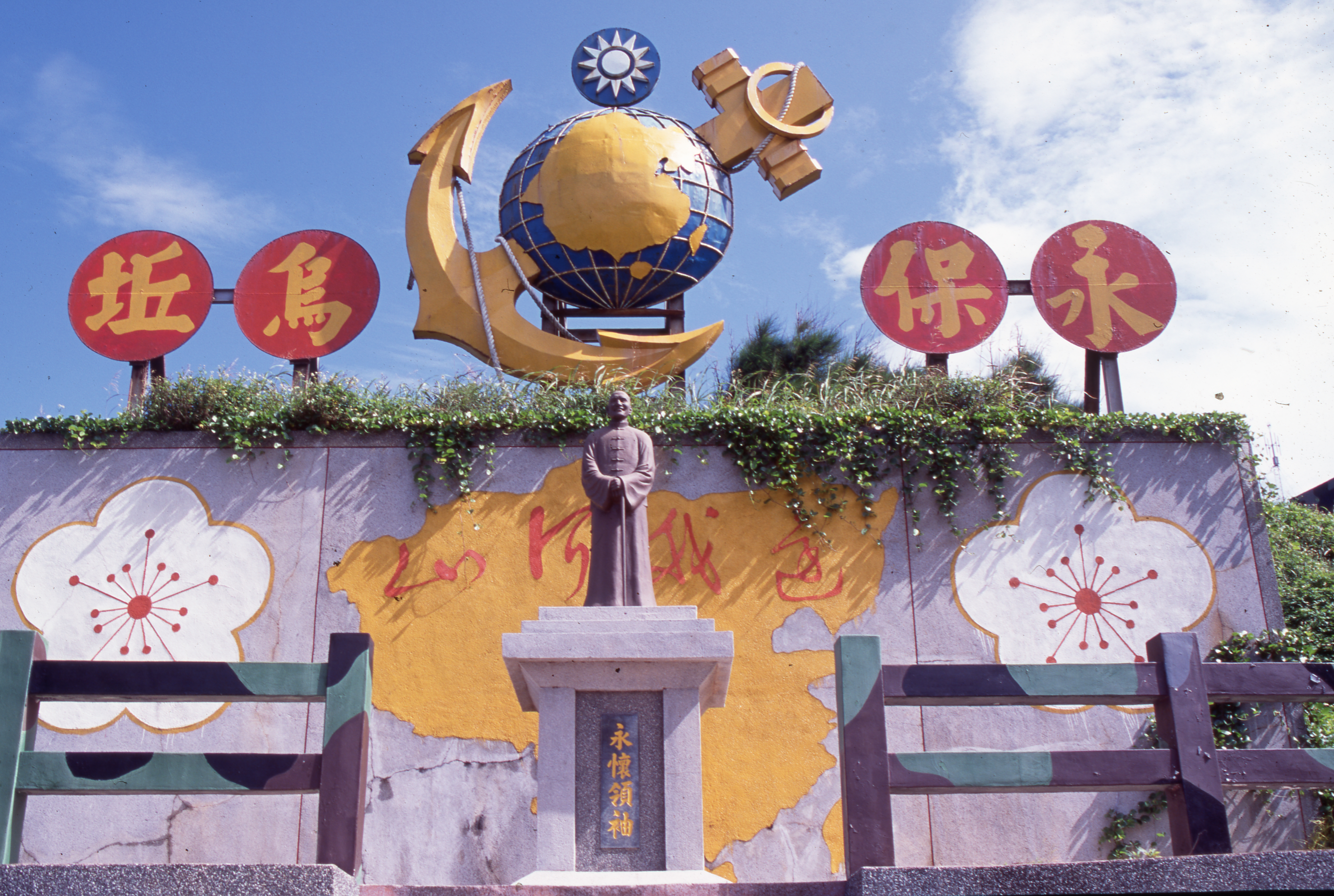
Statue of Chiang Kai-shek on Daqiu

Once the War Affairs Committee was founded in July 1956, strong and complete foundation for war affairs was built in the township.

In February 1957, the British cargo ship Hydralock ran aground off Ockseu Island. All 31 crew abandoned ship, but then disappeared. They were later discovered safe on Haitan Island.

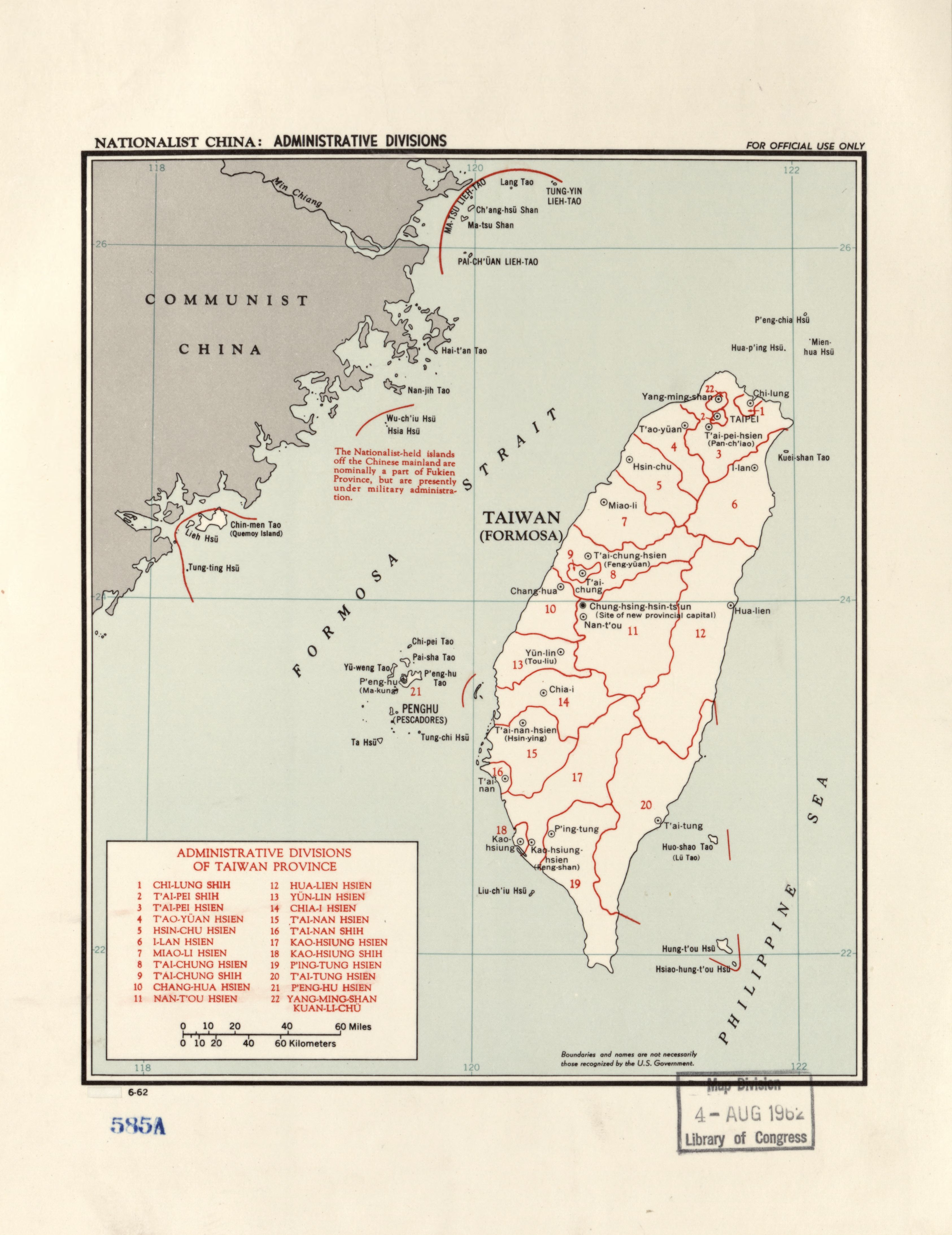
Wu-ch'iu Hsü (Daqiu) and Hsia Hsü (Xiaoqiu) "The Nationalist-held islands off the Chinese mainland are nominally a part of Fukien Province, but are presently under military administration." (1962)

In the summer of 1965, then-Minister of National Defense Chiang Ching-kuo visited the island as part of an inspection.

Late on the night of November 13, 1965, the Nationalist patrol boat Yungtai and the minesweeper Yungchang were on patrol southwest of the islands covering amphibious boats that were unloading supplies to Wuchiu. At just after midnight, eight Chinese Communist boats (three escort destroyers and five gunboats) coming from Quanzhou (Chuanchou) attacked the two Nationalist boats (烏坵海戰). The Yungchang was sunk almost immediately with fifteen survivors who were rescued by the USS O'Brien. Yungtai sunk four of the Communist gunboats but was scrapped due to excessive damage from the engagement.

In the early morning of March 20, 1974, Lt. Wu Miao-huo defected to the PRC. He took a rubber speedboat from Wuchiu to Nanjih Island. Wu wasn't able to get along with his superior officers.

Martial law was lifted from the township on 7 November 1992.

On 29 January 1994, Wuqiu residents had their first election to elect the fourth head of Wuqiu Township. And on 16 July 1994, the residents had their first election to elect the fourth village heads of Daqiu Village and Xiaoqiu Village.

In November 1994, General Li Kai, commander of the troops at Wuqiu, committed suicide.

During the Third Taiwan Strait Crisis in 1996, military sources in Taipei expected China to attack a small Taiwan-held island. The most likely target was Wuchiu, then garrisoned by 500 soldiers. The outlying islands were placed on high alert.

In 1998, Zero Chou produced a documentary about the islands called Yi Shi Zai Hai Xia Zhong ("Lost in the Strait") (Chinese: 遺失在海峽中：烏坵, 48 mins).

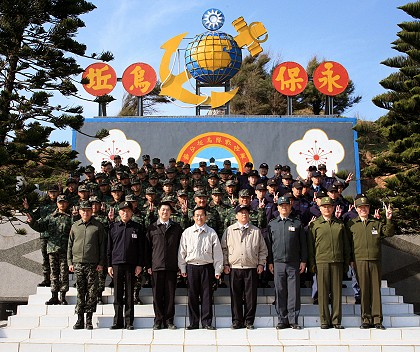
President Chen Shui-bian on Wuqiu

On December 26, 2001, President Chen Shui-bian visited Wuqiu and delivered remarks. Chen was the first president to visit Wuqiu during their presidency.

In 2012, Wuqiu, along with Daren Township in Taitung County, was proposed by the Ministry of Economic Affairs as the candidate of the new disposal site of nuclear waste after the Lanyu Storage Site in Orchid Island, Taitung County. This proposal however received heavy objection from the local Wuqiu residents.

On July 23, 2017, after a period of sixty years in which the lighthouse remained disused, the Wuqiu Lighthouse resumed service.

On August 24, 2017, Chen Fu-Hai, then-magistrate of Kinmen County, visited the Wuqiu Township Office.

On the night of August 2, 2019, a cargo ship in port at Wuqiu struck a tetrapod in choppy waves. The ship sank but the thirteen crew members were rescued by the Wuqiu Islands Garrison Command.

In March 2020, the Kinmen County Animal and Plant Health Inspection and Quarantine Office (金門縣動植物防疫所) sent five persons to Wuqiu to sterilize five dogs on the island in order to prevent the dogs from breeding and causing problems for the residents.

On March 29, 2020, at about 3:55 PM, a capsized ship from mainland China, Haifa 88 (海發88), which had entered Wuqiu's restricted waters on March 9, broke free from the anchorage holding it in place and floated away. On March 9 at 7:32 AM, the ship had been in a collision with another larger ship from mainland China, Minshiyu 07725 (閩獅漁07725), in Wuqiu's restricted waters, and the four man crew of the ship were rescued at that time.

In late April 2020, Magistrate Yang Cheng-wu visited Wuqiu for the first time as magistrate and stayed overnight.

In May 2023, Mayor Tsai Yen-Ming (蔡燕明) was convicted of violating elections law and sentenced to three years and two months in prison.

== Geography ==
Wuqiu consists of Greater Qiu Islet (大坵嶼, Dàqiū yǔ) and Smaller Qiu Islet (小坵嶼, Xiǎoqiū yǔ, Hsia Hsü 下嶼) with a total area of 1.2 km^{2}, not to be confused with two islets Daqiu Island (Chinese: 大坵島; pinyin: Dàqiū dǎo) and Xiaoqiu Island (Chinese: 小坵島; pinyin: Xiǎoqiū dǎo) lying off the north coast off Beigan in the Matsu Islands (Lienchiang County). The islands are considered a basepoint of the Chinese territorial sea by the PRC.

Greater Qiu Islet lies 9 nautical miles (17 km) from Luci Island (Lusi Island), 12 nmi (22 km) from Nanri Island, and 18 nmi (33 km) from Meizhou Island, all in Xiuyu District of Putian, Fujian, China (PRC). It is distant from other territory in Taiwan (ROC) being 72 nmi (133 km) from Kinmen, 86 nmi (159 km) from Nangan in the Matsu Islands, and 73 nmi (135 km) from Port of Taichung on Taiwan.

== Government and politics ==
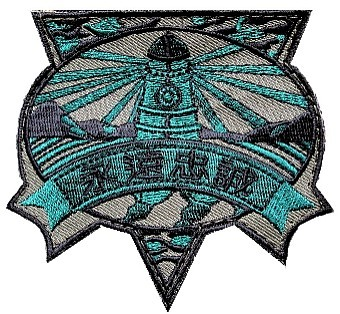
Wuqiu Islands Garrison Command Patch

=== Administrative divisions ===
Wuqiu township is made up of two rural villages:

- Daqiu Village (大坵村)
- Xiaoqiu Village (小坵村)

=== Elections ===
==== Presidential elections ====
113 residents of Wuqiu participated in the 2020 Taiwanese presidential election.

No.	Party	Presidential Candidate	Vice Presidential Candidate	Votes	Percentage
1	People First Party	James Soong	Sandra Yu	2	1.77%
2	Kuomintang	Han Kuo-yu	Chang San-cheng	96	84.96%
3	Democratic Progressive Party	Tsai Ing-wen	William Lai	15	13.27%

=== Mayors ===
- Yang Jui-Ta (楊瑞大)
- Li Yi-chiang (李毅強)
- Tsai Yuan-Chen (蔡元珍)
- Chen Hsing-Chiu (陳興坵)
- Tsai Yung-Fu (蔡永富)

=== Military ===
The Wuqiu Islands Garrison Command (烏坵守備大隊 – Wūqiū Shǒubèi Dàduì) defends the islands. The Republic of China Navy has deployed twenty XTR-102 systems in Wuqiu.

== Demographics ==
Historical population
Year	Pop.	±%
1977	229	—
1978	227	−0.9%
1979	203	−10.6%
1980	194	−4.4%
1981	188	−3.1%
1982	194	+3.2%
1983	191	−1.5%
1984	171	−10.5%
1985	169	−1.2%
1986	152	−10.1%
1987	147	−3.3%
1988	133	−9.5%
1989	116	−12.8%
1990	105	−9.5%
1991	98	−6.7%
1992	85	−13.3%
1993	105	+23.5%
1994	98	−6.7%
1995	90	−8.2%
1996	93	+3.3%
1997	126	+35.5%
1998	383	+204.0%
1999	383	+0.0%
2000	374	−2.3%
2001	362	−3.2%
2002	378	+4.4%

There are 400 people with household registration in Wuqiu Township. The total population living on the islands fluctuates with the seasons.

== Economy ==
Due to its location surrounded by ocean, fishing is the primary source of income for its residents.

== Infrastructure ==
Drinking water is provided to the residents by using reverse osmosis equipment. Generators are used to improve power shortages.

== Transportation ==
Ferry services and resupply between Greater Kinmen and Daqiu is run by the military every fifteen days. Transportation between Daqiu and Xiaoqiu (900 meters apart) was historically carried out by sampan. In 2008, the county government received a subsidy to build a boat for the township.

Ferry connection is available to the Port of Taichung on Taiwan.

== Culture ==
The languages spoken in Wuqiu are the native Pu–Xian Min and Taiwanese Mandarin.

== Tourist attractions ==
- Wuqiu Lighthouse

== See also ==
- Kinmen
- List of islands of Taiwan
