= Xiaoqiu Village =

Rural village in Taiwan

Coordinates: 24°59′00″N 119°28′24″E

Xiaoqiu Village(Chinese: 小坵村) is located on the western side of the Taiwan Strait and is an administrative district of Wuchiu Township under the jurisdiction of the Republic of China's Fujian Province. Originally part of Putian County, it is currently administered by Kinmen County. Xiaoqiu Village is surrounded by the sea on all four sides, including the main island of Xiaoqiu and nearby reefs, and the entire area falls under the military control zone of the Republic of China.
