= List of islands of Fujian =

This is a list of islands of Fujian under the administrative rule of the People's Republic of China. Islands currently administered by the Republic of China as part of the Fujian Province are not included.

== Fuzhou ==
=== Lianjiang County ===
==== Huangqi ====
Islands in Huangqi include:

- Donggu Jiao (东鼓礁) / Donggujiao Qundao (东鼓礁群岛) 26.295856°N 119.893463°E
- Houyu Dao (鲎屿岛) 26°21′N 119°52′E
- Jinsha Niuyu Dao (金沙牛屿岛) 26°18′N 119°51′E
- Jinsha Qundao (金沙群岛) 26°18′N 119°51′E
- Niuweidongyu Dao (牛尾东屿岛) 26°17′N 119°53′E
- Pingkuai Yu (坪块屿) 26°18′N 119°51′E
- Pingniuweiyu Dao (坪牛尾屿岛) 26°18′N 119°53′E
- Sanyayu Dao (三牙屿岛) 26°17′N 119°54′E
- Shangjiaoyu Dao (上礁屿岛) 26°17′N 119°53′E
- Shujiaoyu Dao (鼠礁屿岛) 26°22′N 119°53′E
- Shukuai Yu (竖块屿) 26°18′N 119°51′E
- Yangtan Dao (洋潭岛) 26°21′N 119°53′E
- Yuanshanzaiyu Dao (圆山仔屿岛) 26°17′N 119°54′E
- Zhijiao Yu (指礁屿) 26°18′N 119°51′E

==== Tailu ====
Islands in Tailu include:

- Daniuyu Dao (大牛屿岛) 26°22′N 119°57′E
- Datan (大磹 / 大潭岛) 26°22′N 119°54′E
- Dongluo Dao (东洛岛) 26.415863°N 119.91044°E
- Guojiang Yu (过江岛) 26°25′N 119°54′E
- Guo Yu (Guoyu Dao; 过屿 / 过屿岛) 26.380204°N 119.94686°E
- Hengchengjiao Dao (横塍礁岛) 26°18′N 119°53′E
- Kedou Yu (蝌蚪屿) 26°22′N 119°58′E
- Nanliuyu Dao (南流屿岛) 26°21′N 119°56′E
- Nanwei Yu (Nanweiyu Dao; 南尾屿 / 南尾屿岛) 26°22′N 119°54′E
- Santan Dao (三潭岛) 26°22′N 119°53′E
- Shuangjiyu Dao (双髻屿岛) 26°21′N 119°56′E
- Sitan Dao (四潭岛) 26°22′N 119°53′E
- Xiaoniujiaoyu Dao (小牛礁屿岛) 26°22′N 119°57′E
- Yang Yu (Yangyu Dao; 洋屿 / 洋屿岛) 26.36933°N 119.969543°E
- Yangyue Dao (仰月岛) 26°22′N 119°56′E
- Zhiluo Dao (址洛 / 祉洛岛) 26.424587°N 119.897233°E

=== Pingtan County ===
- Pingtan Island
- Niushan Island

== Ningde ==
=== Xiapu County ===
==== Haidao Township ====
Islands in Haidao Township include:

- Xiyang Island (西洋岛), also known as Spider Island (Zhizhu Island, Chih-chu Tao; 蜘蛛島) 26.509879°N 120.045344°E
- Fuying Island (浮鹰岛), also known as Double Peak Island (Shuangfeng Island; 雙峯島) 26.578459°N 120.140509°E
- the Sishuang Islands (Sishuang Liedao, Pei-shuang Lieh-tao; 四礵列岛)
  - Beishuang Island (Pei-shuang; 北礵岛) 26.702357°N 120.352581°E
  - Dongshuang Island (Tung-shuang; 东礵岛) 26.681677°N 120.382951°E
  - Xishuang Island (Hsi-shuang; 西礵岛) 26.654204°N 120.321156°E
  - Nanshuang Island (Nan-shuang; 南礵岛) 26.645148°N 120.356295°E
- Xiaoxiyang Island (小西洋岛), also known as Isthmus Island (Yisimasi Island, I-ssu-ma-ssu Tao; 乙四馬四島) 26.546441°N 120.001213°E
- Kuishan Island (Kuishan Dao; 魁山岛), also known as Zhuishan (Chui Shan; 錐山) 26.493586°N 120.134632°E
- Maci Island (Ma Chick; 马刺岛) 26.538001°N 120.139128°E
- Nigu Island (Nu Geu Sen; 尼姑屿) 26.557534°N 120.151459°E
- Wu Island (Inside Island; 乌屿) 26.556564°N 119.968421°E
- Ma'an Island (马鞍岛) 26.529661°N 120.022837°E
- Dadong Island (大东屿) 26.502041°N 119.983012°E

== Putian ==
=== Xiuyu District ===
Inhabited islands in the Xiuyu District include:

- Meizhou Island, the legendary birthplace of the goddess Matsu and a famous pilgrimage site
- Nanri Island, site of the Battle of Nanri Island in October 1952
- Xiaori Island, north of Nanri Island
- Xigaobei Island (西筶杯岛)
- Donggaobei Island (东筶杯岛)
- Huanggua Island (黄瓜岛)
- Da'ao Islet (大鳌屿)
- Dongluopan Island (东罗盘岛)
- Chishan (赤山)
- Shanle Islet (山乐屿)

Uninhabited islands in the district include:

- Luci Island (Lusi Island, Lu-tz'u Hsü; 鸬鹚岛 / 鹭鸶岛 / 鷺鷥島 / 鷺鶿㠘) which is 9 nmi (17 km) to the north-northwest of the Wuqiu Islands (Ockseu). (The Wuqiu Islands are a rural township of Kinmen County, Fujian, Republic of China (Taiwan). The islands are claimed by the PRC.)
- Lida Islet (里大屿)
- Lixiao Islet (里小屿)
- Baimian Islet (白面屿)
- Etou (鹅头)
- Dongjiaoshan (东峤山)
- Tayuzaiqiao (塔屿仔礁)
- Huangqiqing Islet (黄岐青屿)
- Tinggangqing Islet (汀港青屿)
- Ai Islet (硋屿)
- Zao Islet (灶屿)
- Dingbanshiduo (鼎板石多)
- Houqing Islet (后青屿)
- Jilong Islet (鸡笼屿)
- Shifojiao (石佛礁)
- Fushiduo (浮石多)
- Li Islet (笠屿)
- Liaohou Island (寮后岛)
- Niu Islet (牛屿)
- Shiqiujiao (狮球礁)
- Jiangqijiao (姜奇礁)
- Sanfan Islet (三帆屿)
- Toujin Islet (头金屿)
- Shichengqing Islet (石城青屿)
- Shichengda Islet (石城大屿)
- Chenshiduo Islet (沉石多屿)
- Dongyuzi (东屿仔)
- Ji Islet (鸡屿)
- Mei Islet (眉屿)
- Lüxunwei Islet (绿浔尾屿)
- Da'angjiao (大昂礁)
- Neiyuzi (内屿仔)
- Waiyuzi (外屿仔)
- Luoxun Islet (落浔屿)
- Meihuashiduo (梅花石多)
- Majiao Islet (马鲛屿)
- Heng Islet (横屿)
- Niao Islet (鸟屿)
- Yuanlianshiduo (圆连石多)
- Hou Islet (鲎屿)
- Dongtou Islet (东头屿)
- Baishiduo (白石多)
- Bai Islet (白屿)
- Yuehe Island (月合岛)
- Zhuganjiao (竹竿礁)
- Batoushan (扒头山)
- Xiao'ao Islet (小鳌屿)
- Jimu Islet (鸡母屿)
- Long'ershiduo (龙耳石多)
- Gaolingpai Islet (高灵牌屿)
- Xiluopan Islet (西罗盘屿)
- Gewei Islet (隔尾屿)
- Xiaohengsha Islet (小横沙屿)
- Weidun Islet (尾墩屿)
- Hengsha Islet (横沙屿)
- Xiaomin Islet (小鳘屿)
- Damin Islet (大鳘屿)
- Chizi Islet (赤仔屿)
- Chishanzi (赤山仔)
- Xiaoyue Islet (小月屿)
- Dongdu Islet (东都屿)
- Dongyue Islet (东月屿)
- Dalu Islet (大炉屿)
- Dongsha Islet (东沙屿)
- Weisha Islet (尾沙屿)
- Xiaomai Islet (小麦屿)
- Damai Islet (大麦屿)
- Niushishiduo (牛屎石多)
- Haizuzi Island (海卒仔岛)
- Dashiting (打石亭)
- Gushanzi (鼓山仔)
- Weishan (尾山)
- Fu Islet (浮屿)
- Hailong Islet (海龙屿)
- Datiejiao Islet (大铁角屿)
- Heishiduo (黑石多)
- Huzi Islet (虎仔屿)
- Dazhong Islet (大钟屿)
- Yan Islet (燕屿)
- Yanshan Island (燕山岛)
- Xiaozhong Islet (小钟屿)
- Libiao Islet (里表屿)
- Waibiao Islet (外表屿)
- Yangyuzi (羊屿仔)
- Yang Islet (羊屿)
- Xiawei Islet (下魏屿)
- Shashiduo (沙石多)
- Jijia Islet (鸡甲屿)
- Chi Islet (赤屿)
- Dongchuanbaimian Islet (东川白面屿)
- Beiding Islet (北碇屿)
- Yuziweishiduo (屿仔尾石多)
- Nanding Islet (南碇屿)
- Xixiayuzi (西下屿仔)
- Dongxiayuzi (东下屿仔)
- Jianziyu (箭仔屿)
- Hong Islet (红屿)
- Wu Islet (乌屿)
- Huang Islet (黄屿)
- Hujiaojiao (沪角礁)
- Huangniuyujiao (黄牛屿礁)
- Yushan (屿山)
- Shiliu Islet (石榴屿)
- Waishiduo Islet (外石多屿)
- Wenjiada Islet (文甲大屿)
- Xiao Islet (小屿)
- Hushi Islet (虎狮屿)
- Chiyushan (赤屿山)
- Waibai Islet (外白屿)
- Libai Islet (里白屿)
- Xiaoding Islet (小碇屿)
- Gongdan Islet (公蛋屿)
- Zhong Islet (中屿)
- Yangyushan (洋屿山)
- Hou Islet (猴屿)
- Dading Islet (大碇屿)
- Tiedingzi Islet (铁丁仔屿)
- Jishijiao (鸟屎礁)
- Jin Islet (进屿)
- Shimen Islet (石门屿)
- Hongshan (红山)
- Gui Islet (龟屿)
- Shi Island (石岛)
- Talinqing Islet (塔林青屿)
- Dabaishiduo (大白石多)
- Menxia Islet (门峡屿)
- Pan Islet (盘屿)
- Cai Islet (采屿)
- Ping Islet (瓶屿)

== Quanzhou ==
=== Nan'an ===
Islands in Nan'an include:

- Kui Yu (奎屿) 24°35′N 118°25′E
- Dabai Yu (大佰屿 or 大百屿) 24°34′N 118°27′E
- Xiaobai Yu (小佰屿 or 小百屿) 24°34′N 118°26′E

== Xiamen ==
=== Xiang'an ===
==== Dadeng Subdistrict ====
The Dadeng (Tateng) Islands are claimed as part of Kinmen County (Quemoy) by Taiwan (ROC). China (PRC) has administered the islands since 1949.

Dadeng Subdistrict is made up of offshore islands and islets including:

- Dadeng (Tateng, Twalin) (大嶝岛)
- Xiaodeng (Hsiaoteng, Town I.) (小嶝岛)
- Jiaoyu/Jiao Yu (Chiao I., Reef I. 角屿)
- Baihajiao (白蛤礁/白哈礁)

== Zhangzhou ==
=== Longhai ===
==== Gangwei ====
Islands in Gangwei include:

- Bai Yu (白屿)
- Shuangyu Dao (双鱼岛), man-made island 24.378458°N 118.067306°E
- Pozao Yu (破灶屿)
- Qing Yu (Ch'ing Hsü; 青屿, also 下青屿) 24.363631°N 118.124438°E (southwest of Dadan Island and Erdan Island in Lieyu Township, Kinmen County, Taiwan (ROC))
- Wu'an Yu (浯垵屿)
- Wu Yu (Wu Hsu; 浯屿/浯屿岛) 24.331636°N 118.14494°E (south of Dadan Island and Erdan Island in Lieyu Township, Kinmen County, Taiwan (ROC))
- Xiaopozao Yu (小破灶屿)

== See also ==
- List of islands of China
- Xiaodeng Island
