= Meizhou (disambiguation) =

Meizhou (梅州) is a prefecture-level city in Guangdong, China.

Meizhou may also refer to:

- Meizhou Island (湄洲岛), an island in the Taiwan Strait, under the administration of Putian, Fujian, China as Meizhou Town
- Meizhou Township (梅州乡), a township in Zhao'an County, Zhangzhou, Fujian, China
- 3239 Meizhou, a main-belt asteroid discovered in 1978, see list of minor planets: 3001–4000
