= Luci Island =

Island off the coast of Fujian, China

Coordinates: 25.12218°N 119.364999°E

Native name: 鸬鹚岛 / 鸬鹚屿
- Location in the Taiwan Strait

Geography
- Location: In the Taiwan Strait, southeast of the Asian mainland in Pinghai Town (平海镇), Xiuyu District, Putian, Fujian
- Area: 0.454 km^{2} (0.175 sq mi)
- Length: 1,290 m (4230 ft)
- Width: 930 m (3050 ft)
- Coastline: 4,768 m (15643 ft)
- Highest elevation: 37.5 m (123 ft)

Administration
- China
- Province: Fujian
- Prefecture-level city: Putian
- District: Xiuyu
- Town: Pinghai (平海镇)

Additional information
- Time zone: China Standard (UTC+8)

Luci Island (Chinese: 鸬鹚岛 / 鸬鹚屿; pinyin: Lúcí Dǎo/Yǔ/Xù; Wade–Giles: Lu^{2}-tzʻŭ^{2} Tao^{3}/Yü^{3}/Hsü^{4}; lit. 'cormorant island') (also Loutz Island (Lu-tzʻu, Lucih) and Lusi Island (Lusih, Lu-ssu) (Chinese: 鷺鷥島; pinyin: Lùsī Dǎo; Wade–Giles: Lu^{4}-ssŭ^{1} Tao^{3}; lit. 'little egret island') is an uninhabited island southeast of the Asian mainland in Pinghai Town (平海镇), Xiuyu District, Putian, Fujian, People's Republic of China (PRC) and 9 nautical miles (17 km) north-northwest of Wuciou Township (Ockseu), Kinmen County (Quemoy), Republic of China (Taiwan) which can be seen from the island.

== History ==
In 1991, the island was rented to Hong Kong businessmen to be made into a resort, and a dock and several unfinished buildings were built.

In January 2019, notice was given of the navigational hazard of the ship Xinhangjun (鑫航君) which sunk in the waters near the island.

On June 16, 2019, a wind power plant on the island started operation.

== Economy ==
The sea surrounding the island produces Chinese white shrimp, croceine croaker, ribbonfish, swimming crab and lobster. Stone buildings on the island are used by fishermen as temporary residences.

== Gallery ==
Maps including Luci Island:

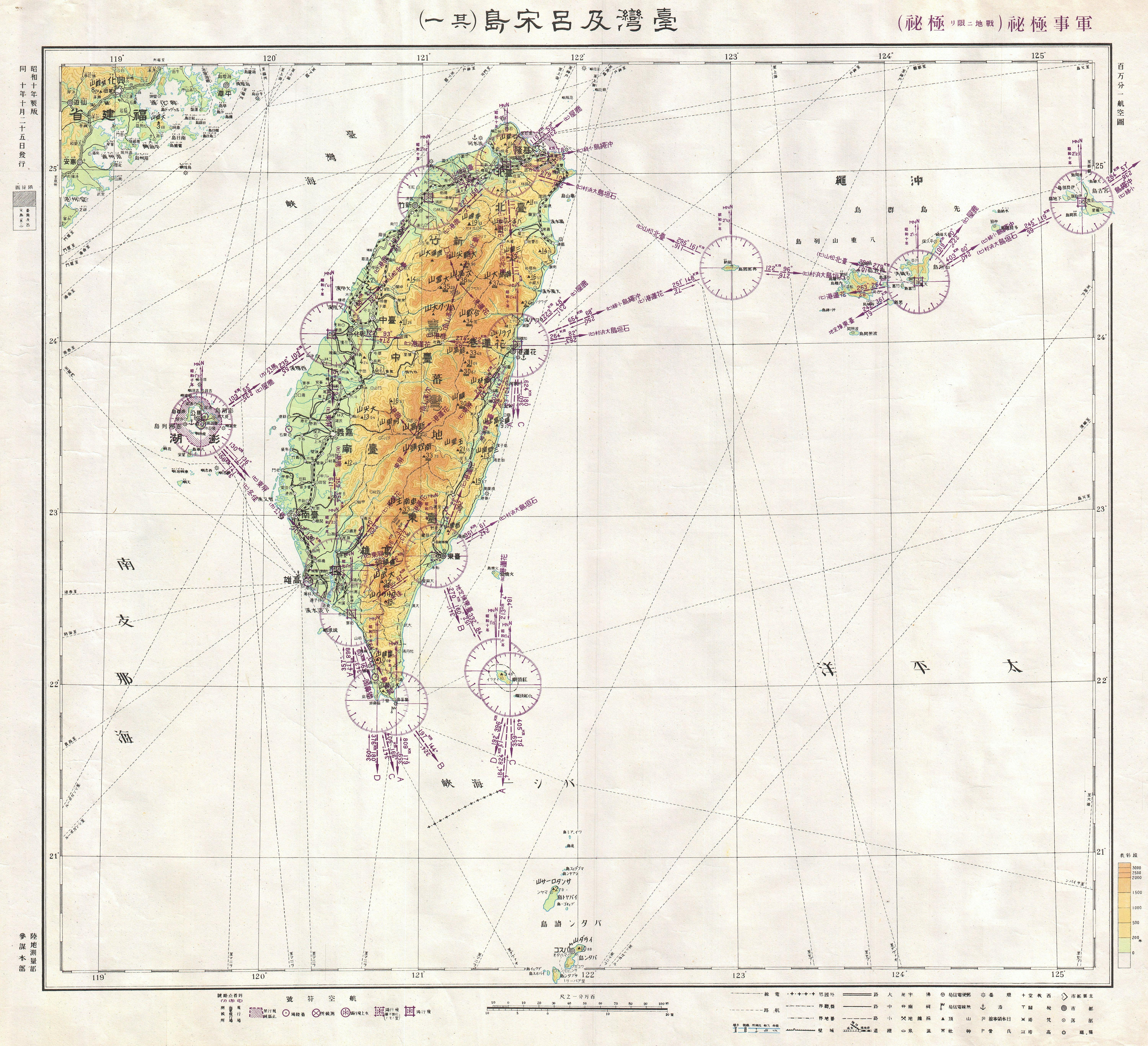
Japanese map including Luci Island (labeled as 鷺鷥島) (1943)

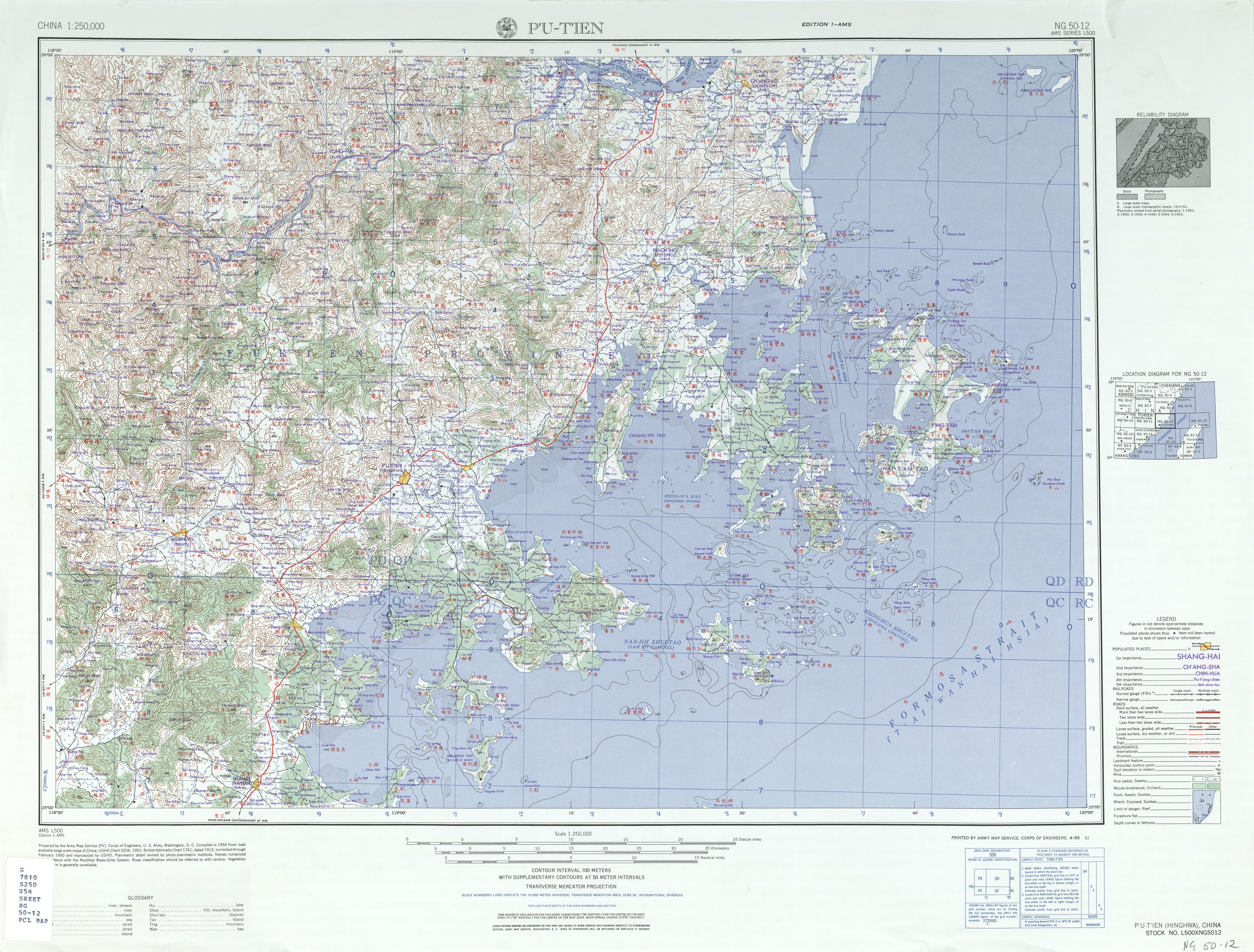
Map including Luci Island (labeled as Lu-tzʻu Hsü 鷺鶿㠘) (AMS, 1954)

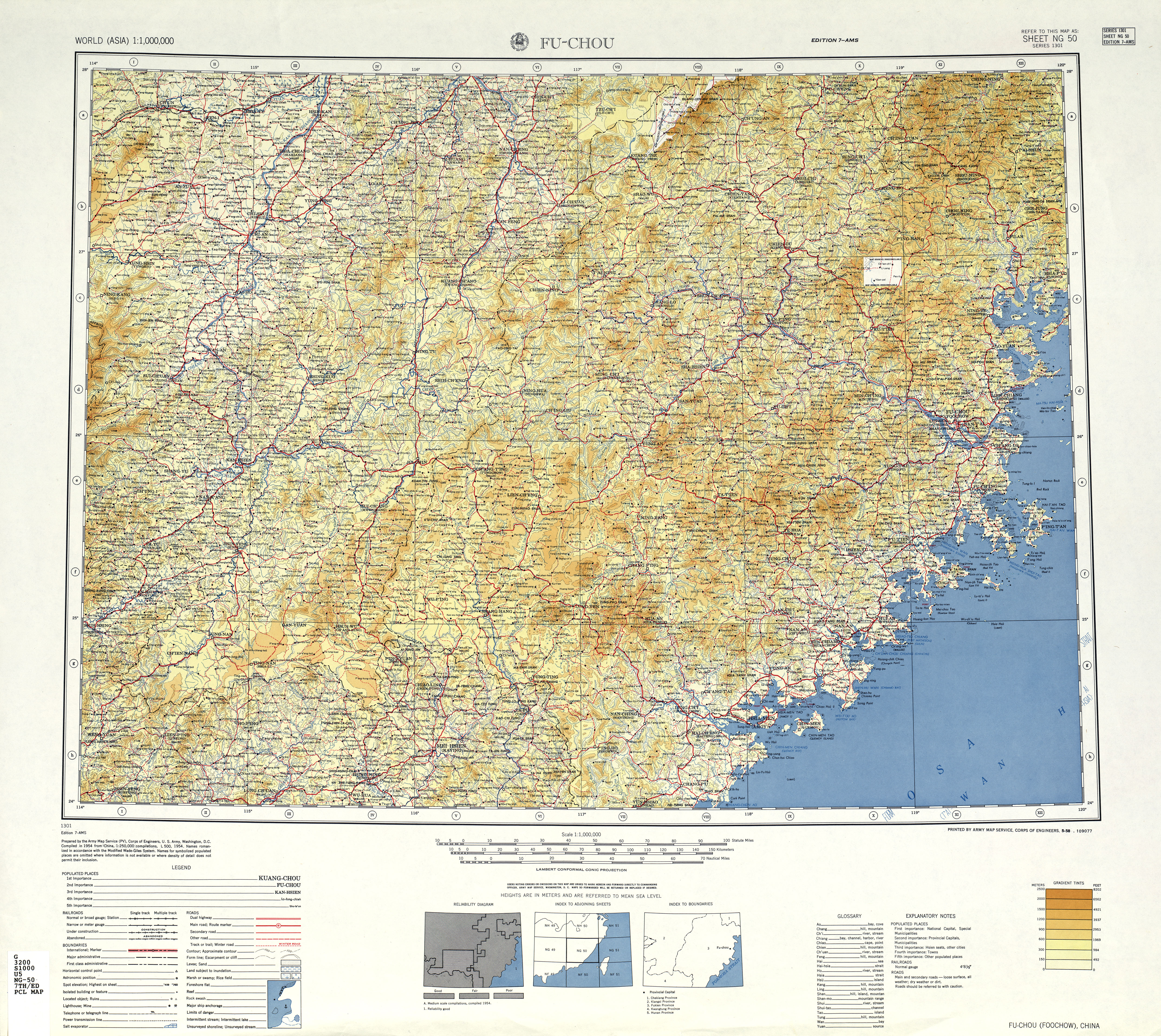
Map including Luci Island (labeled as Lu-tzʻu Hsü (Loutz I)) (AMS, 1954)

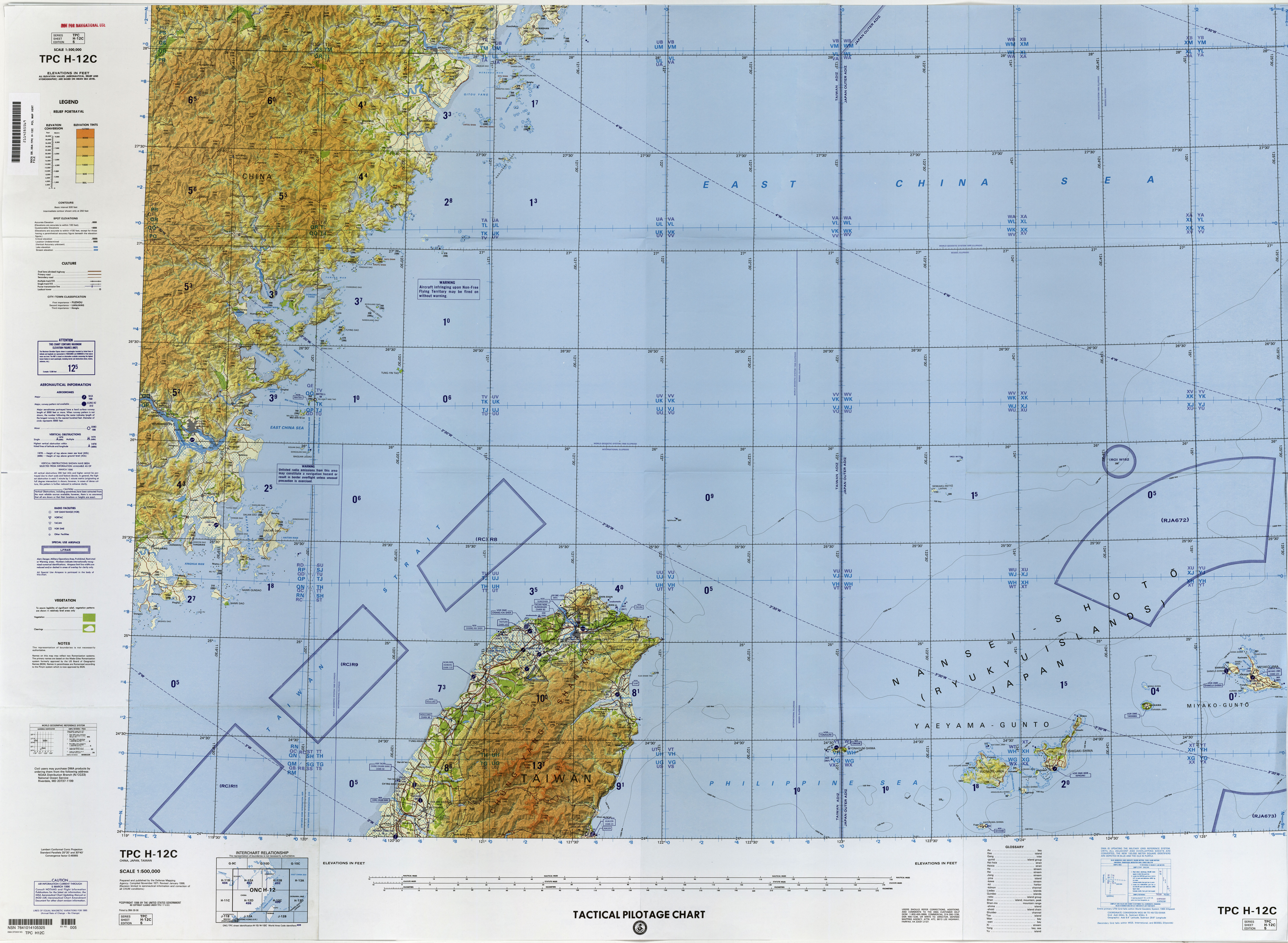
Map including Luci Island (labeled as LUCI-YU) (DMA, compiled 1971, revised 1996)

== See also ==
- List of islands of Fujian
- List of uninhabited islands
