= Niushan Island =

Island in Fujian, China

Niushan Island Turnabout Island
Native name: 牛山岛 (Chinese)
- Location within Fujian Location within China

Geography
- Location: East China Sea
- Coordinates: 25°26′07″N 119°56′12″E
- Area: 0.34 km^{2} (0.13 sq mi)

Niushan Island
- Traditional Chinese: 牛山㠀
- Simplified Chinese: 牛山岛
Transcriptions
Standard Mandarin
- Hanyu Pinyin: Niúshān Dǎo
- Wade–Giles: Niu²-shan¹ Tao³

Niushan Island, also known as Niushan Dao, Niushandao, Kiushan Tao or Turnabout Island, is an island in Nanlai Village (南赖村), Aoqian Town (澳前镇), Pingtan County, Fuzhou, Fujian Province in the People's Republic of China. It forms part of the boundary between the East and South China Seas at the north end of the Taiwan Strait. Niushan Island is the closest China (PRC)-administered island to Taiwan (main island).

== History ==
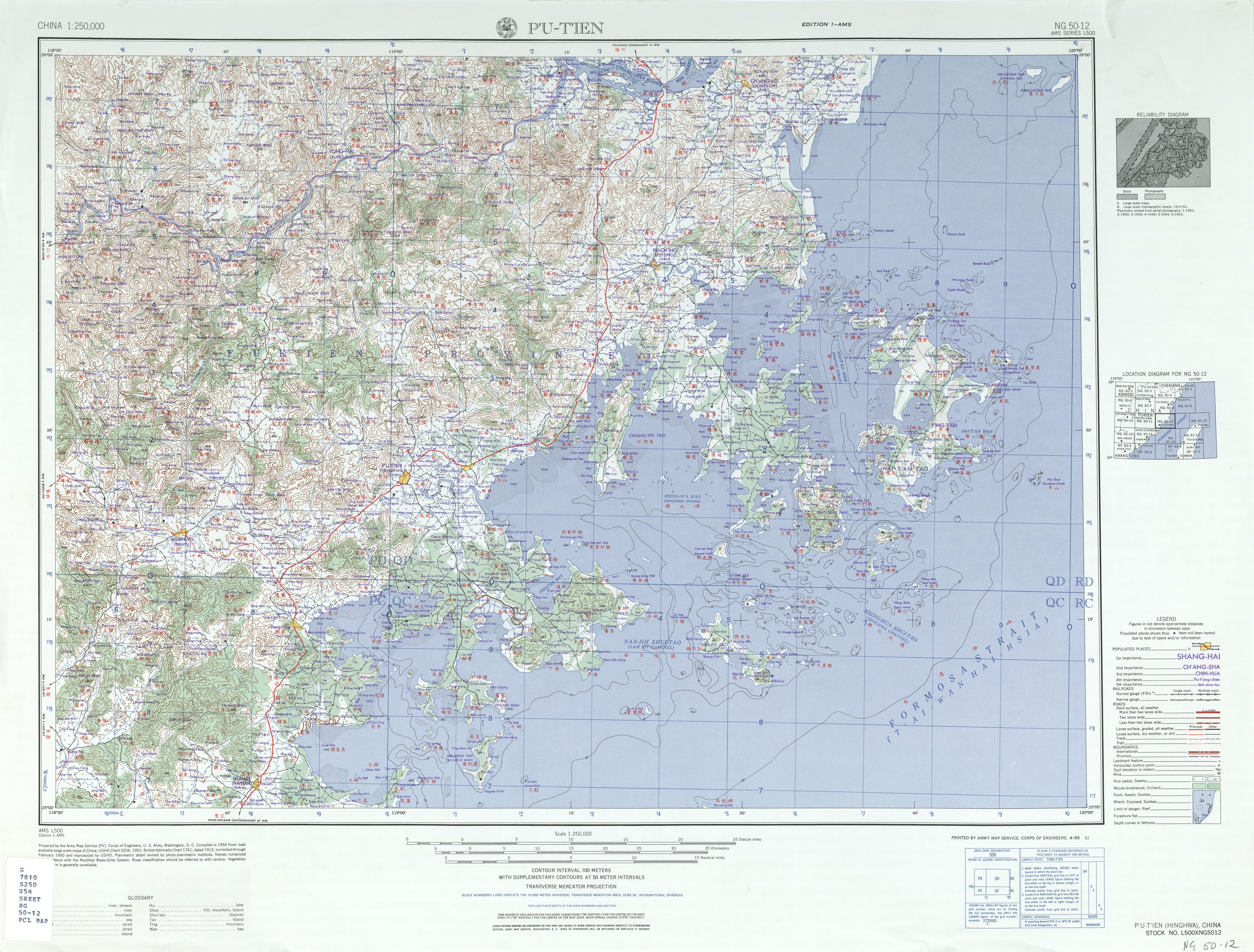
Map including Niushan Dao (labeled as Niu Shan (Turnabout Island) 牛山) (AMS, 1954)

=== 19th century ===
The island and its shoals are a hazard to navigation. In 1873, a lighthouse was built on the island. A 1901 sailing manual describes the island as being about 218 feet high, having two islets, and dangerous rocks to the north and south. The manual describes the light:

LIGHT.—A fixed white light is exhibited from a lighthouse 54 feet in height, on the summit of Turnabout island, visible all round. It is elevated 257 feet above high water, and should be seen in clear weather, a distance of 23 miles.
The tower, which is of stone, is painted black, and the keepers' dwelling and surrounding walls white.

The SS San Pablo was owned by the Occidental and Oriental Steamship Company. The ship ran between San Francisco and Hong Kong.

The San Pablo had been intended as a collier between San Francisco and Tacoma, but Occidental & Oriental converted her for passenger service. Her first trip as a refitted passenger vessel started April 26, 1887.

In 1887, Antonio Jacobsen painted a waterscape of the ship.

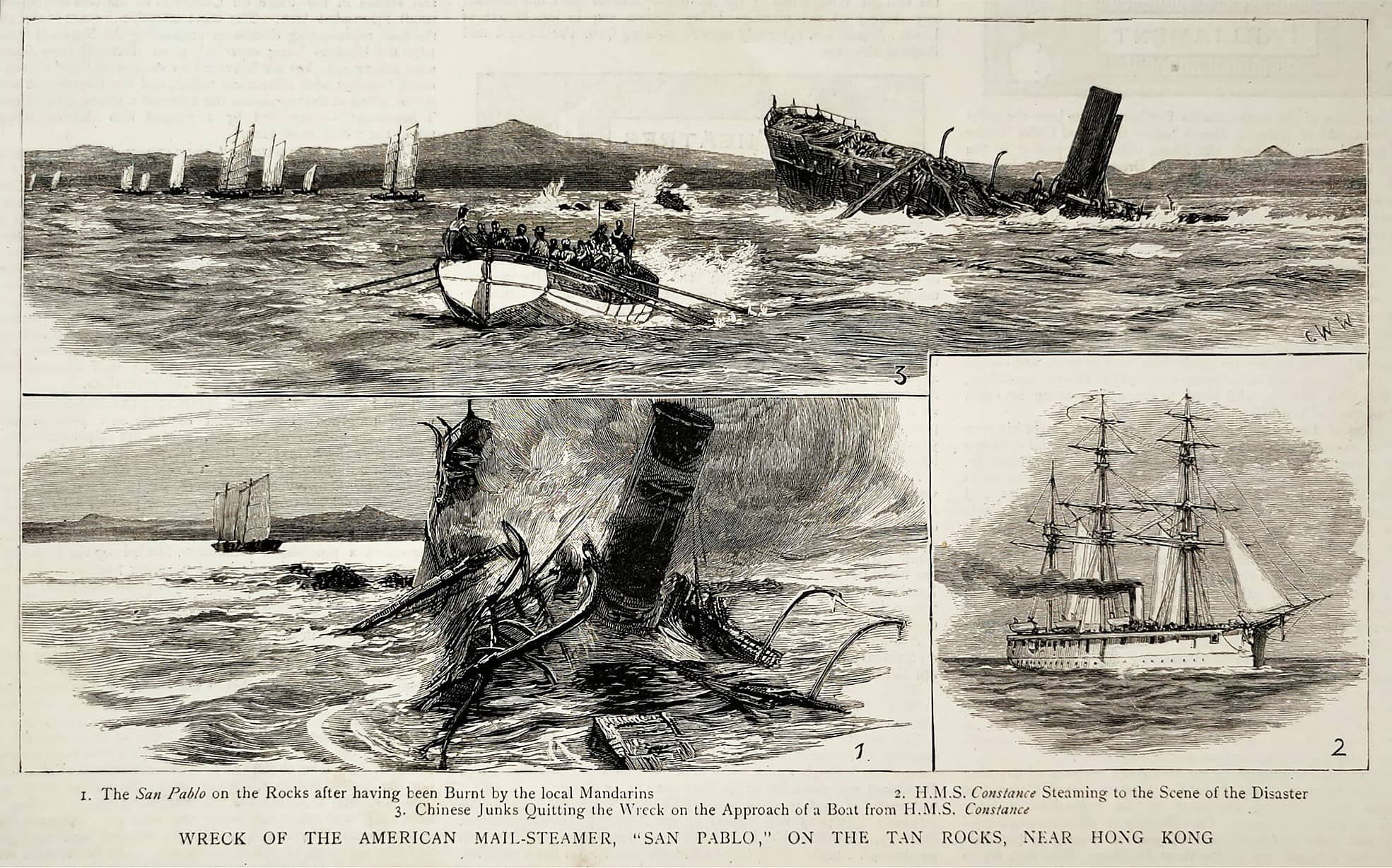
Wreck of the American Mail-Steamer, San Pablo, on the Tan Rocks. The Graphic 1888

On April 24, 1888, the San Pablo was in the Formosa Strait. There was a thick fog, and the ship ran aground north of Turnabout Island at about 3:30 in the morning. The ship was hard aground, and two holds and a coal bunker filled with water. The ship was at risk of capsizing. The ship was going to be abandoned, and the crew and passengers were about to head for Niushan lighthouse, when the ship was set upon by pirates from the mainland. Captain Reed armed the passengers and crew, and the first attack was repulsed. During a second attack, the pirates gained the main deck, but were beaten back with steam hoses. The pirates waited half a mile from the ship.

The crew and passengers then made for land, and the pirates took the ship. While the pirates had the ship, a fire broke out, and the San Pablo burned to the waterline.

=== 20th century ===
In September 1910, the center of a typhoon swept over Niushan Island (Turnabout Island) and Wuqiu (Ockseu) or a few miles to the southeast.

In 1921, the British watercolorist John Fraser painted Passing Turnabout Island. China Sea - 1875. Vessel under full sail. The painting is held by National Maritime Museum.

In May 1938, the Japanese captured Amoy and gained control of the lighthouse. In June 1942, the Chinese managed to blow up the lighthouse and then retreat. Japanese troops then occupied the island and constructed a temporary lighthouse and a radio station. In April 1945, some unarmed Chinese troops dressed as fishermen and some fishermen evaded some Japanese security checks and landed on the island under the guise of supplying or collecting food. They were able to separate and surprise the Japanese on the island. At one point, a single Japanese guard was watching a group of Chinese; they killed him and gained his weapon. Stones were also used as weapons. The Chinese gained control of the island.

On 25 October 1944, the USS Tang (SS-306) discovered a large, well-protected, convoy near Turnabout Island. Tang penetrated the destroyer screen and attacked the convoy. Tang sank several ships and evaded the destroyers. Later Tang attacked one of the ships she had damaged, but Tang fell victim to a circular run by one of her own torpedoes.

On April 1, 1945, the submarine USS Queenfish (SS-393) torpedoed the Awa Maru near Turnabout Island in what became known as the Awa Maru incident. The Japanese government had obtained safe passage for the vessel as a Red Cross relief ship. Only one of the 2004 passengers survived.

The lighthouse was destroyed during World War II. A temporary lighthouse was installed in 1947 and refurbished in 1982. In 1987, a new lighthouse was built. The lighthouse may have been rebuilt in December 1998.

=== 21st century ===
In August 2013, Typhoon Trami brought winds reaching 163.4 km per hour to the island.

In September 2015, Typhoon Dujuan brought winds reaching 45.9 meters per second to the island.

On September 27–28, 2016, Typhoon Megi brought torrential rains across Pingtan. Recorded wind speeds on Niushan Island reached 45 meters per second.

== See also ==
- Baselines of the Chinese territorial sea
- List of islands of Fujian
- Pingtan Island
