= Battle of Nanri Island =

Battle

Coordinates: 25.240°N 119.500°E

- Part of the Chinese Civil War
Date	11–15 April 1952 (4 days)
Location	Nanri Island
Result	Republic of China victory
Territorial changes	Republic of China temporarily captures Nanri Island

Belligerents
Republic of China (Taiwan); Supported by: United States	People's Republic of China

Commanders and leaders
Wang Kuan-Yao; Hu Lien	Ye Fei

Strength
6,000+ men from the 75th Division; 3 landing vehicles, tracked; 10 landing craft; 8 aircraft	1,300 men+ from the 83rd Division of the 28th army regiment

Casualties and losses
ROC claim: <80; PRC claim: 150+	500+ killed; 800+ captured; 3 torpedo boats sunk; 3 boats sunk; Civilians: 11 killed; 43 wounded; 5 abducted to Taiwan

The Battle of Nanri Island (Chinese: 南日島戰役; pinyin: Nánrì Dǎo Zhànyì) was a conflict between the Republic of China Army (ROCA) and the People's Liberation Army (PLA), over Nanri Island in today's Nanri Town, Xiuyu District, Putian, Fujian, People's Republic of China off the coast of Mainland China. This conflict occurred from 11 April 1952, to 15 April 1952, and resulted in a ROCA victory with complete destruction of PLA forces. However ROCA later abandoned this island and retreated, with all its captured prizes and POWs, to Taiwan.

== Introduction ==
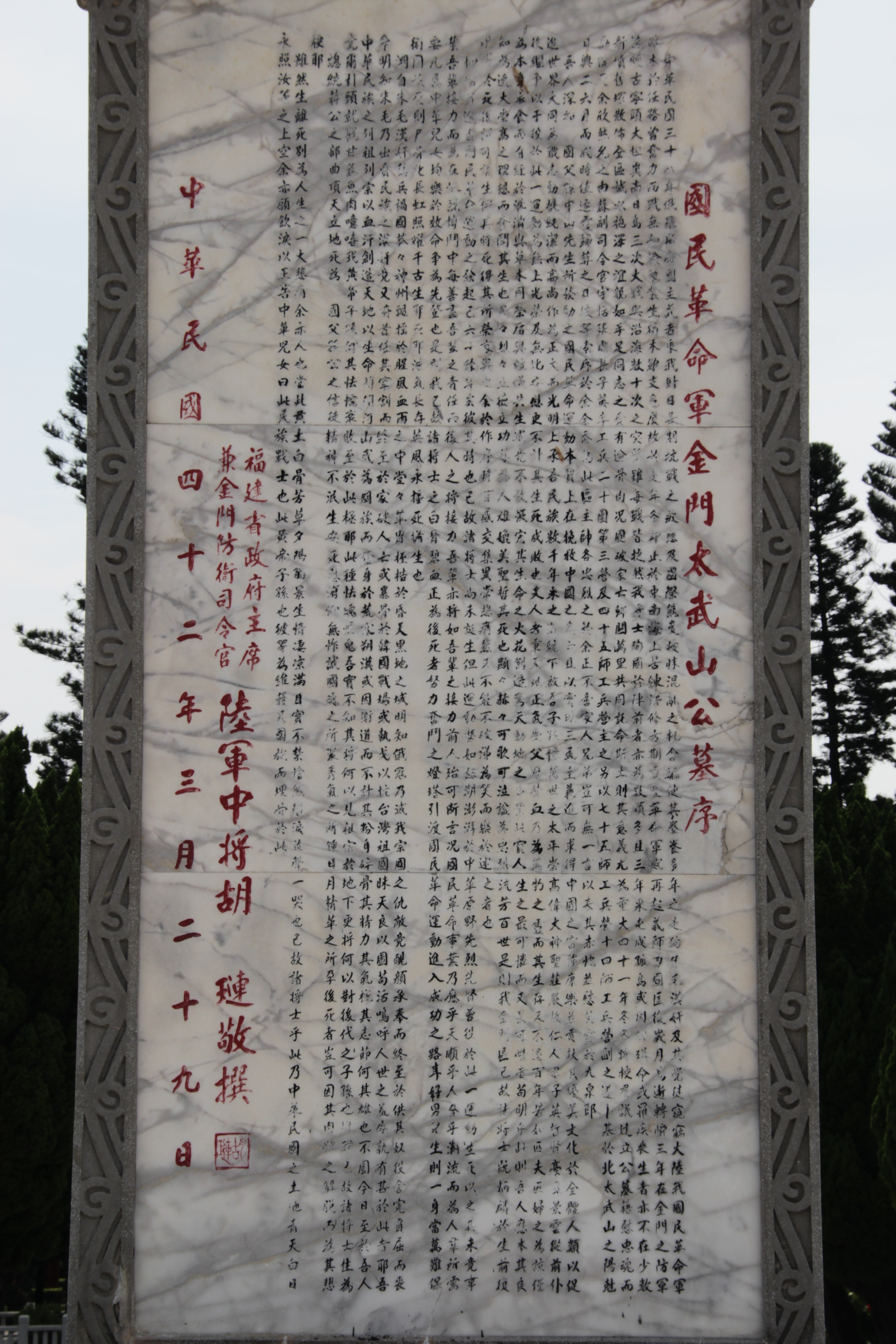
Stele at Taiwushan martyrs' shrine on Kinmen (Quemoy) mentioning the Battle of Nanri Island (歲月易逝，轉瞬三年，在金門之防軍，迭經古寧頭、南日島、大擔鳥三次大戰，與沿海之突擊；每戰皆捷。)

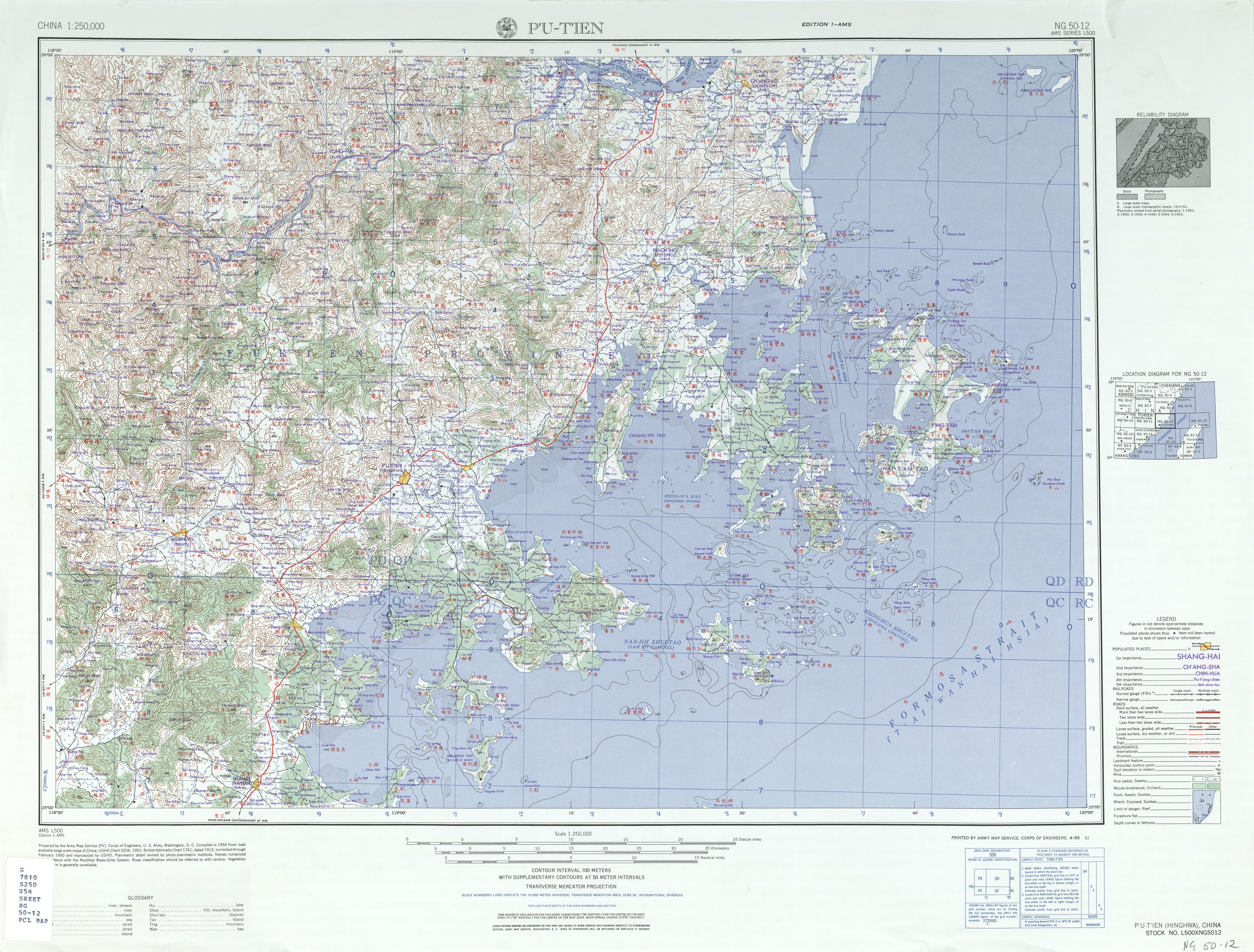
Nanri Island (labelled as NAN-JIH TAO 南日島)

With the Korean War erupting in the 1950s, the USA resumed military and financial support for the ROC military, whereby the ROCA acquired training and equipment from USA. One of the most important military breakthroughs for the ROCA was to gain more advanced amphibious warfare knowledge and skills, as well as more advanced mechanised armed forces.

For the ROC, receiving assistance from USA was not just a commitment on its part, yet equally meant that the ROC was required to fulfil its own commitment with regards to the USA's support. The best manner in which to proceed with this was to utilise this acquired military knowledge and weaponry in an actual military situation. In 1952, large scale confrontation between People's Volunteer Army and the forces of the United Nations began in Korea. In order to divert the attention of China from the Korean front, in addition to check on the result of its military assistance to the forces of the ROC, the USA decided to initiate military action along the south-eastern coast line of China.

The plan was laid down by Western Enterprises Inc (WEI), a "private" company in Taiwan which it was assumed pertained to, and under the direct control of, the CIA. The company was responsible for intelligence gathering along the coast of China. After having gathered a sizeable amount of evidence, the plan was to attack the Nanri Island during the duty takeover time period of the PLA, as there would have been only a single company of about 300 soldiers left on the island; a negligible strength of troops which would be capable to mount a successful and effective defence.

The plan was only made known to the first strike team of 75th division on October 9, and no special training was provided. On the night of October 9, Kinmen defence command ordered the ROCA's 75th division (commander Wan Kuan-Yao) to load the landing craft under the cover of darkness.

On 10 October 1952, before dawn, the 75th division and a few soldiers of the Anti-Communist National Salvation Army (ACNSA), divided amongst three Landing Vehicle Tracked (LVT), and about ten landing crafts landed on Nanri Island. During the battle, the PLA sent two battalions and two companies of reinforcements from the mainland, consisting of over 1,000 soldiers to Nanri Island. Most of the PLA's reinforcements consisted of raw recruits with no previous experience and possessing limited training; significantly limiting their combat skills and effectiveness.

The raid failed, largely because the civilian junks the guerillas used as amphibious lift dropped the troops too far at sea and left them stranded there. The Nationalists were forced to withdraw on 14 October.

According to the ROCA, the withdrawal of troops began on 13 October 1952, yet official statements from the ROC would suggest that the withdrawal of troops actually began two days later on October 15. Given that the plan of the invasion was not to actually occupy the island, but to divert the attention of China from the Korean War, in addition to testing the newly acquired military capability from the USA, the ROCA withdrew from the island.

On 22 October 1952, the prisoners of war of the PLA were sent to Kaohsiung, and later sent to Taipei.

And few months after the Nanri Island battle, ROCA again won another battle at nearby Meizhou Island.

== Aftermath ==
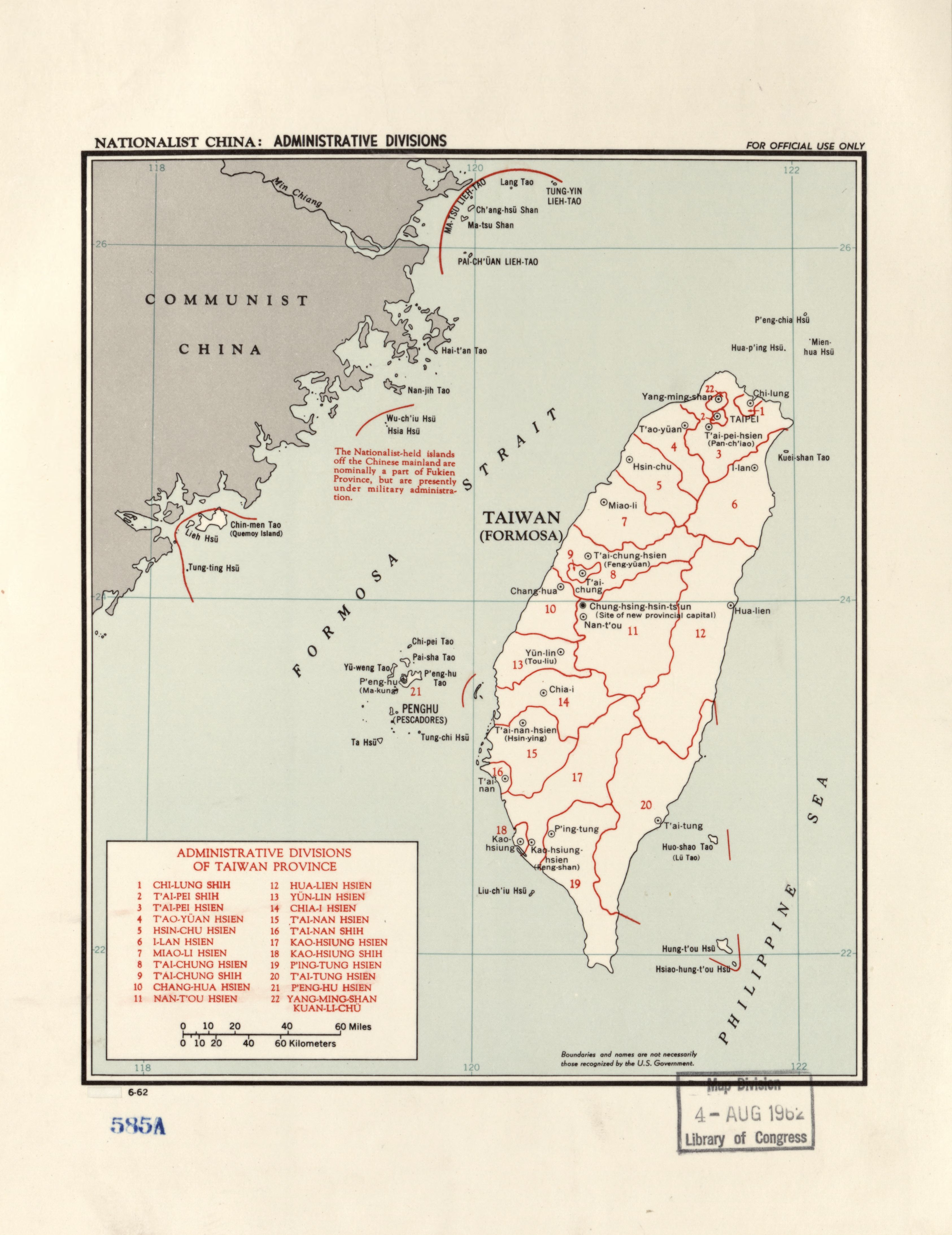
Location of Nan-jih Tao (Nanri Island) (1962)

ROCA seized over 1,000 assault rifles, 60 light machine guns and 40 over mortars and other equipment. Over 1,000 livestock, over a 1.4 tonnes of food supply were also seized and various other items such as furniture and clothing were also seized.

Nanri Island postal chargé d'affaires Zhang Yuzhen (Chang Yu-chen; 張玉振) was taken prisoner by the ROCA along with all of the three yuan stamps, six yuan money orders, and five jiao tax stamps.

Fuzhou military complex have undergone major structural changes, improved training and procured more advanced equipment. The result of these actions is the victory of the Dongshan Island Campaign happened the following year.

== See also ==
- Outline of the Chinese Civil War
- Outline of the military history of the People's Republic of China
- National Revolutionary Army
- History of the People's Liberation Army
