= Xiuyu, Putian =

Xiuyu 秀屿区
- District
- Meizhou Matsu Temple

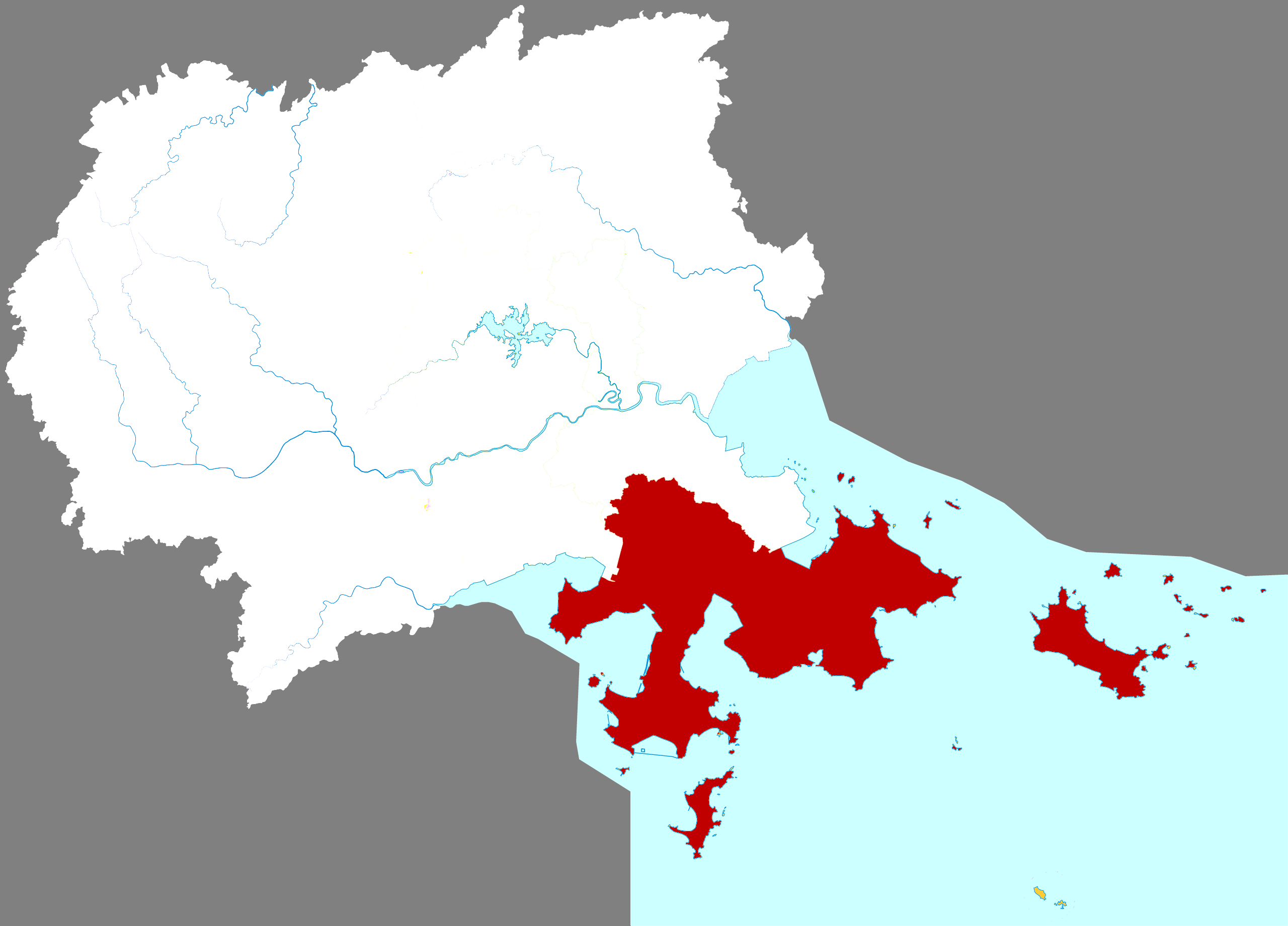
- Location in Putian

- Location in Fujian
- Coordinates: 25°20′00″N 119°05′54″E
- Country: People's Republic of China
- Province: Fujian
- Prefecture-level city: Putian

Area
  - Total: 684.81 km^{2} (264.41 sq mi)
  - Land: 566.8 km^{2} (218.8 sq mi)
  - Water: 118 km^{2} (46 sq mi)

Population (2010)
  - Total: 570,741
  - Density: 1,007/km^{2} (2,608/sq mi)
- Time zone: UTC+8 (China Standard)
- Website: ptxy.gov.cn (in Chinese)

Xiuyu District (simplified Chinese: 秀屿区; traditional Chinese: 秀嶼區; pinyin: Xiùyǔ Qū) is a district of the city of Putian, Fujian, People's Republic of China. The district executive, legislature and judiciary are in Hushi Town (笏石镇), together with the CPC and PSB branches.

== History ==
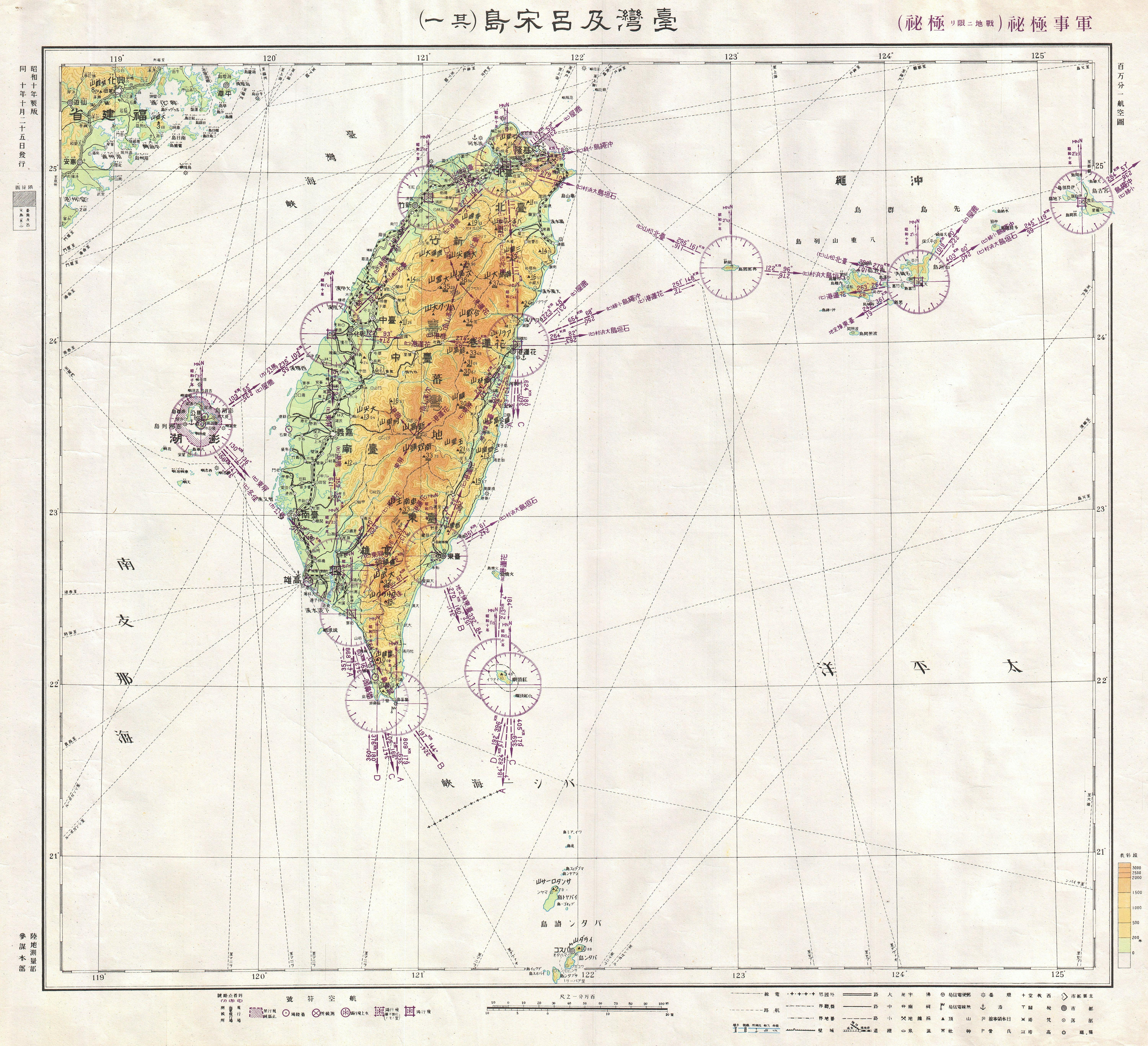
Map including Xiuyu District area (1943)

In October 1952, PRC and ROC forces fought over control of Nanri Island in the Battle of Nanri Island. The ROC gained control of the island but later retreated.

On February 1, 2002, Putian County was split into Licheng District and Xiuyu District.

Around 14:10 UTC (22:10 CST) on August 8, 2015, Typhoon Soudelor made landfall over Xiuyu District as a Category 1-equivalent typhoon.

== Geography ==
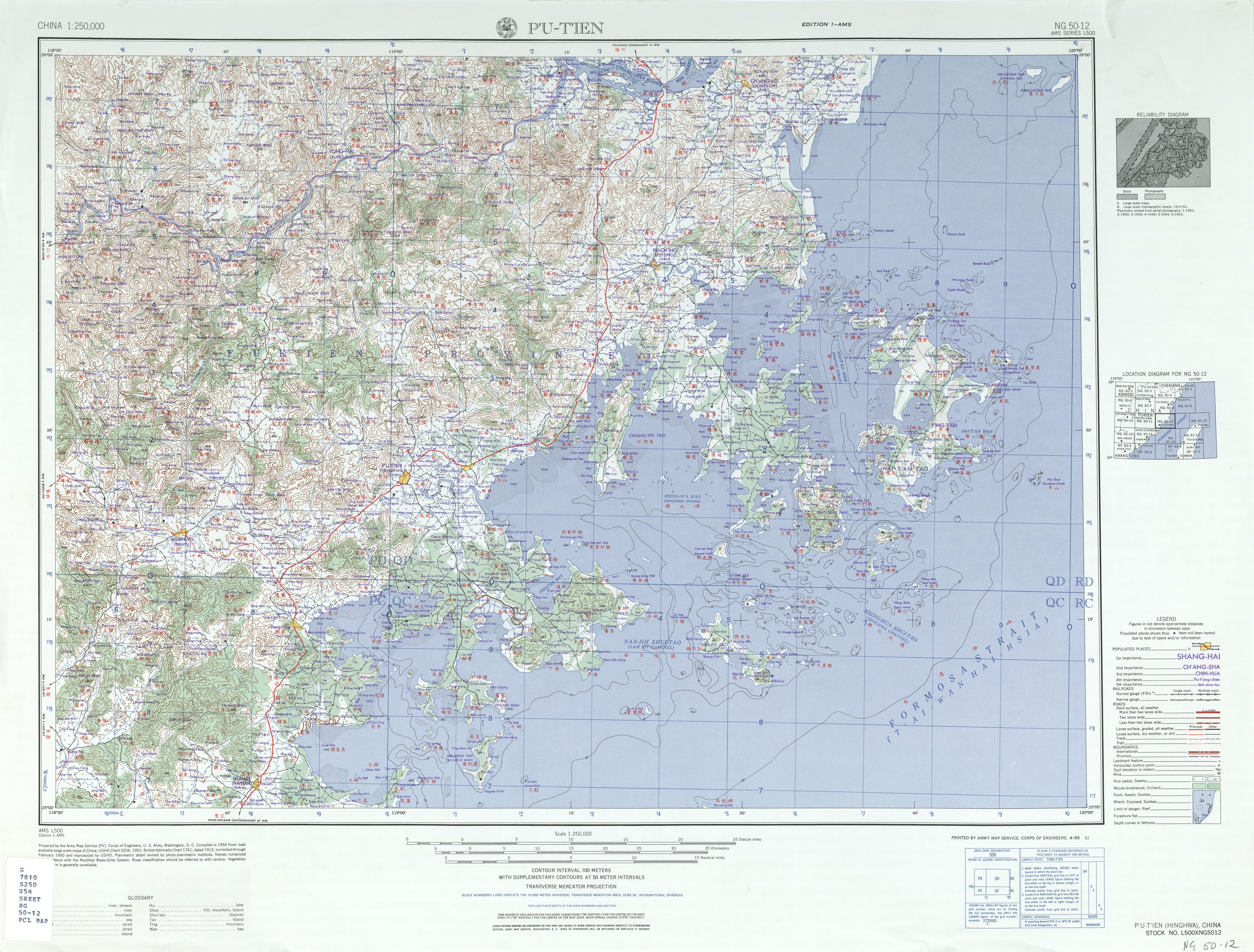
Map including Xiuyu District area (1954)

Inhabited islands in the district include:

- Meizhou Island, the legendary birthplace of the goddess Matsu and a famous pilgrimage site
- Nanri Island, site of the Battle of Nanri Island in October 1952
- Xiaori Island, north of Nanri Island
- Xigaobei Island (西筶杯岛)
- Donggaobei Island (东筶杯岛)
- Huanggua Island (黄瓜岛)
- Da'ao Islet (大鳌屿)
- Dongluopan Island (东罗盘岛)
- Chishan (赤山)
- Shanle Islet (山乐屿)

Uninhabited islands in the district include:

- Luci Island (Lusi Island, Lu-tz’u Hsü; 鸬鹚岛 / 鹭鸶岛 / 鷺鷥島 / 鷺鶿㠘) which is 9 nmi (17 km) to the north-northwest of the Wuqiu Islands (Ockseu). (The Wuqiu Islands are a rural township of Kinmen County, Fujian, Republic of China (Taiwan). The islands are claimed by the PRC.)
- Lida Islet (里大屿)
- Lixiao Islet (里小屿)
- Baimian Islet (白面屿)
- Etou (鹅头)
- Dongjiaoshan (东峤山)
- Tayuzaiqiao (塔屿仔礁)
- Huangqiqing Islet (黄岐青屿)
- Tinggangqing Islet (汀港青屿)
- Ai Islet (硋屿)
- Zao Islet (灶屿)
- Dingbanshiduo (鼎板石多)
- Houqing Islet (后青屿)
- Jilong Islet (鸡笼屿)
- Shifojiao (石佛礁)
- Fushiduo (浮石多)
- Li Islet (笠屿)
- Liaohou Island (寮后岛)
- Niu Islet (牛屿)
- Shiqiujiao (狮球礁)
- Jiangqijiao (姜奇礁)
- Sanfan Islet (三帆屿)
- Toujin Islet (头金屿)
- Shichengqing Islet (石城青屿)
- Shichengda Islet (石城大屿)
- Chenshiduo Islet (沉石多屿)
- Dongyuzi (东屿仔)
- Ji Islet (鸡屿)
- Mei Islet (眉屿)
- Lüxunwei Islet (绿浔尾屿)
- Da'angjiao (大昂礁)
- Neiyuzi (内屿仔)
- Waiyuzi (外屿仔)
- Luoxun Islet (落浔屿)
- Meihuashiduo (梅花石多)
- Majiao Islet (马鲛屿)
- Heng Islet (横屿)
- Niao Islet (鸟屿)
- Yuanlianshiduo (圆连石多)
- Hou Islet (鲎屿)
- Dongtou Islet (东头屿)
- Baishiduo (白石多)
- Bai Islet (白屿)
- Yuehe Island (月合岛)
- Zhuganjiao (竹竿礁)
- Batoushan (扒头山)
- Xiao'ao Islet (小鳌屿)
- Jimu Islet (鸡母屿)
- Long'ershiduo (龙耳石多)
- Gaolingpai Islet (高灵牌屿)
- Xiluopan Islet (西罗盘屿)
- Gewei Islet (隔尾屿)
- Xiaohengsha Islet (小横沙屿)
- Weidun Islet (尾墩屿)
- Hengsha Islet (横沙屿)
- Xiaomin Islet (小鳘屿)
- Damin Islet (大鳘屿)
- Chizi Islet (赤仔屿)
- Chishanzi (赤山仔)
- Xiaoyue Islet (小月屿)
- Dongdu Islet (东都屿)
- Dongyue Islet (东月屿)
- Dalu Islet (大炉屿)
- Dongsha Islet (东沙屿)
- Weisha Islet (尾沙屿)
- Xiaomai Islet (小麦屿)
- Damai Islet (大麦屿)
- Niushishiduo (牛屎石多)
- Haizuzi Island (海卒仔岛)
- Dashiting (打石亭)
- Gushanzi (鼓山仔)
- Weishan (尾山)
- Fu Islet (浮屿)
- Hailong Islet (海龙屿)
- Datiejiao Islet (大铁角屿)
- Heishiduo (黑石多)
- Huzi Islet (虎仔屿)
- Dazhong Islet (大钟屿)
- Yan Islet (燕屿)
- Yanshan Island (燕山岛)
- Xiaozhong Islet (小钟屿)
- Libiao Islet (里表屿)
- Waibiao Islet (外表屿)
- Yangyuzi (羊屿仔)
- Yang Islet (羊屿)
- Xiawei Islet (下魏屿)
- Shashiduo (沙石多)
- Jijia Islet (鸡甲屿)
- Chi Islet (赤屿)
- Dongchuanbaimian Islet (东川白面屿)
- Beiding Islet (北碇屿)
- Yuziweishiduo (屿仔尾石多)
- Nanding Islet (南碇屿)
- Xixiayuzi (西下屿仔)
- Dongxiayuzi (东下屿仔)
- Jianziyu (箭仔屿)
- Hong Islet (红屿)
- Wu Islet (乌屿)
- Huang Islet (黄屿)
- Hujiaojiao (沪角礁)
- Huangniuyujiao (黄牛屿礁)
- Yushan (屿山)
- Shiliu Islet (石榴屿)
- Waishiduo Islet (外石多屿)
- Wenjiada Islet (文甲大屿)
- Xiao Islet (小屿)
- Hushi Islet (虎狮屿)
- Chiyushan (赤屿山)
- Waibai Islet (外白屿)
- Libai Islet (里白屿)
- Xiaoding Islet (小碇屿)
- Gongdan Islet (公蛋屿)
- Zhong Islet (中屿)
- Yangyushan (洋屿山)
- Hou Islet (猴屿)
- Dading Islet (大碇屿)
- Tiedingzi Islet (铁丁仔屿)
- Jishijiao (鸟屎礁)
- Jin Islet (进屿)
- Shimen Islet (石门屿)
- Hongshan (红山)
- Gui Islet (龟屿)
- Shi Island (石岛)
- Talinqing Islet (塔林青屿)
- Dabaishiduo (大白石多)
- Menxia Islet (门峡屿)
- Pan Islet (盘屿)
- Cai Islet (采屿)
- Ping Islet (瓶屿)

== Administrative divisions ==
Eleven towns:

- Hushi (Fashih; 笏石镇), Dongzhuang (东庄镇), Zhongmen (忠门镇), Dongpu (东埔镇), Meizhou (Meichow, Meichou; 湄洲镇), Dongjiao ('Dongqiao'; 东峤镇), Daitou (埭头镇), Pinghai (平海镇), Nanri (南日镇), Shanting (山亭镇), Yuetang (月塘镇, formerly 月塘乡)

Two other areas:

- Qianqin Farm (前沁农场), Houhai Management Area (后海管理局)

== Climate ==
Climate data for Xiuyu, elevation 65 m (213 ft), (1991–2020 normals, extremes 1981–present)
Month	Jan	Feb	Mar	Apr	May	Jun	Jul	Aug	Sep	Oct	Nov	Dec	Year
Record high °C (°F)	26.2 (79.2)	29.4 (84.9)	29.9 (85.8)	30.7 (87.3)	31.9 (89.4)	34.8 (94.6)	36.5 (97.7)	35.8 (96.4)	35.2 (95.4)	34.9 (94.8)	32.4 (90.3)	27.1 (80.8)	36.5 (97.7)
Mean daily maximum °C (°F)	16.0 (60.8)	16.2 (61.2)	18.4 (65.1)	22.6 (72.7)	26.3 (79.3)	29.3 (84.7)	31.8 (89.2)	31.7 (89.1)	30.4 (86.7)	26.9 (80.4)	23.0 (73.4)	18.3 (64.9)	24.2 (75.6)
Daily mean °C (°F)	12.4 (54.3)	12.6 (54.7)	14.7 (58.5)	19.0 (66.2)	23.1 (73.6)	26.4 (79.5)	28.6 (83.5)	28.5 (83.3)	27.0 (80.6)	23.4 (74.1)	19.6 (67.3)	14.8 (58.6)	20.8 (69.5)
Mean daily minimum °C (°F)	10.2 (50.4)	10.3 (50.5)	12.3 (54.1)	16.5 (61.7)	20.8 (69.4)	24.4 (75.9)	26.4 (79.5)	26.2 (79.2)	24.7 (76.5)	21.1 (70.0)	17.4 (63.3)	12.5 (54.5)	18.6 (65.4)
Record low °C (°F)	0.0 (32.0)	2.9 (37.2)	4.4 (39.9)	6.8 (44.2)	14.6 (58.3)	15.7 (60.3)	21.1 (70.0)	22.1 (71.8)	16.7 (62.1)	13.3 (55.9)	7.7 (45.9)	2.8 (37.0)	0.0 (32.0)
Average precipitation mm (inches)	45.1 (1.78)	66.8 (2.63)	105.2 (4.14)	104.3 (4.11)	180.9 (7.12)	245.7 (9.67)	140.3 (5.52)	200.5 (7.89)	119.6 (4.71)	48.0 (1.89)	35.2 (1.39)	38.7 (1.52)	1,330.3 (52.37)
Average precipitation days (≥ 0.1 mm)	7.1	9.9	13.6	13.9	14.9	14.6	8.5	11.4	8.3	4.0	5.2	6.3	117.7
Average relative humidity (%)	72	75	77	78	81	85	81	81	74	68	70	69	76
Mean monthly sunshine hours	133.0	109.1	121.2	139.3	149.2	171.6	258.9	234.7	207.1	200.1	155.3	146.0	2,025.5
Percentage possible sunshine	40	34	32	36	36	42	62	59	57	56	48	45	46
Source: China Meteorological Administration All-time October high
