= Xiaori Island =

Island of Fujian, China

Coordinates: 25.273821°N 119.51853°E

Native name: 小日岛
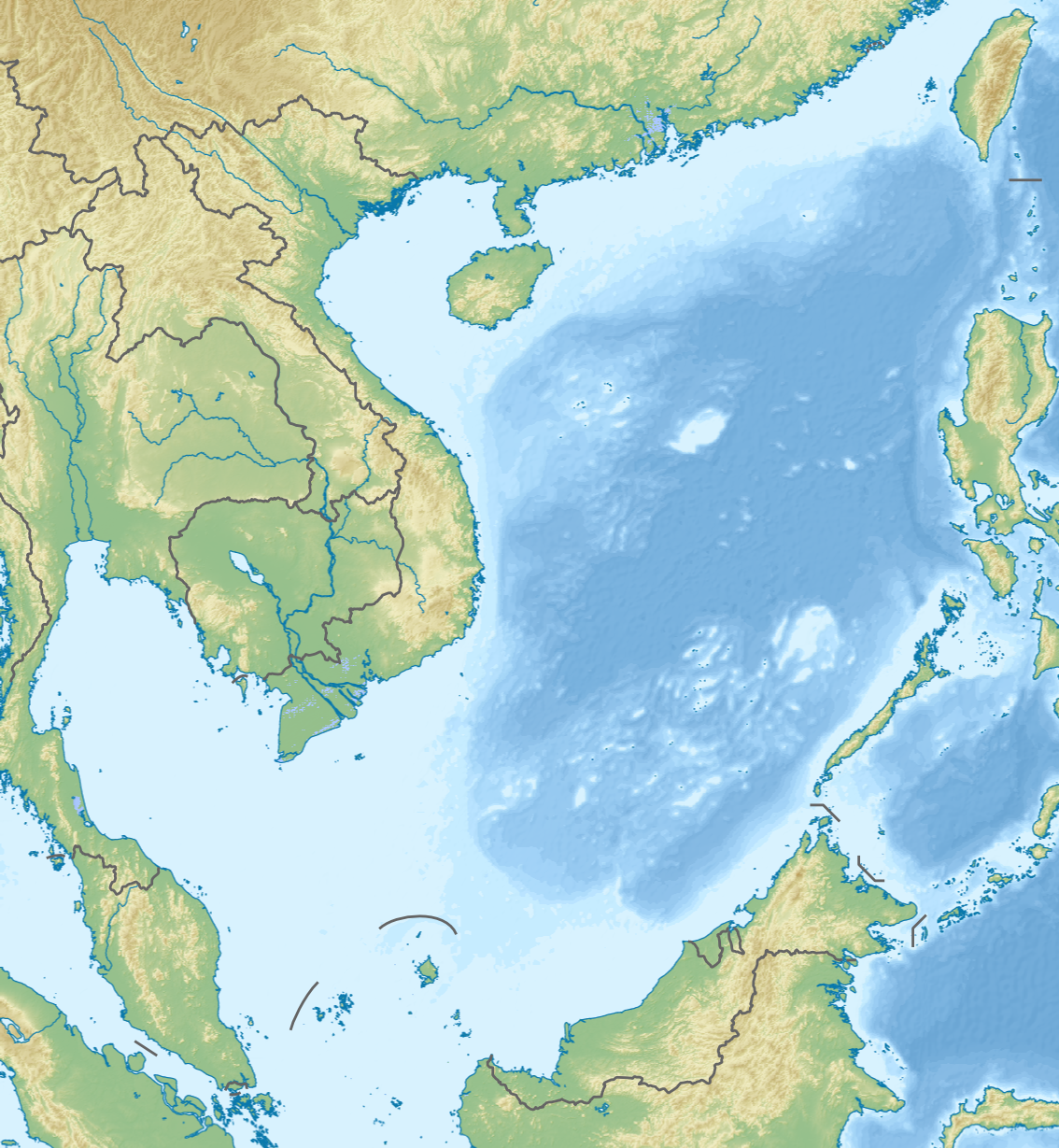
- Location in the Taiwan Strait Xiaori Island (Southeast Asia) Xiaori Island (Asia)

Geography
- Location: In the Taiwan Strait, southeast of the Asian mainland in Nanri Town, Xiuyu District, Putian, Fujian, China
- Area: 1.5 km^{2} (0.58 sq mi)
- Coastline: 8.48 km (5.269 mi)
- Highest elevation: 102.2 m (335.3 ft)

Administration
- China
- Province: Fujian
- Prefecture-level city: Putian
- District: Xiuyu
- Town: Nanri
- Village: Xiaori (小日村)

Additional information
- Time zone: China Standard (UTC+8)

Location of Xiaori Island

Xiaori Island (Chinese: 小日岛; pinyin: Xiǎorì Dǎo; Wade–Giles: Hsiao^{3}-jih^{4} Tao^{3}) is an island off the Asian mainland in Xiaori Village (小日村), Nanri Town, Xiuyu District, Putian, Fujian, China (PRC).

On the night of January 1, 2020, the fishing ship Zhecangyu 07868 (浙苍渔07868) struck a rock near Xiaori Island. The ten crew members were rescued.

== Gallery ==
Maps including Xiaori Island:

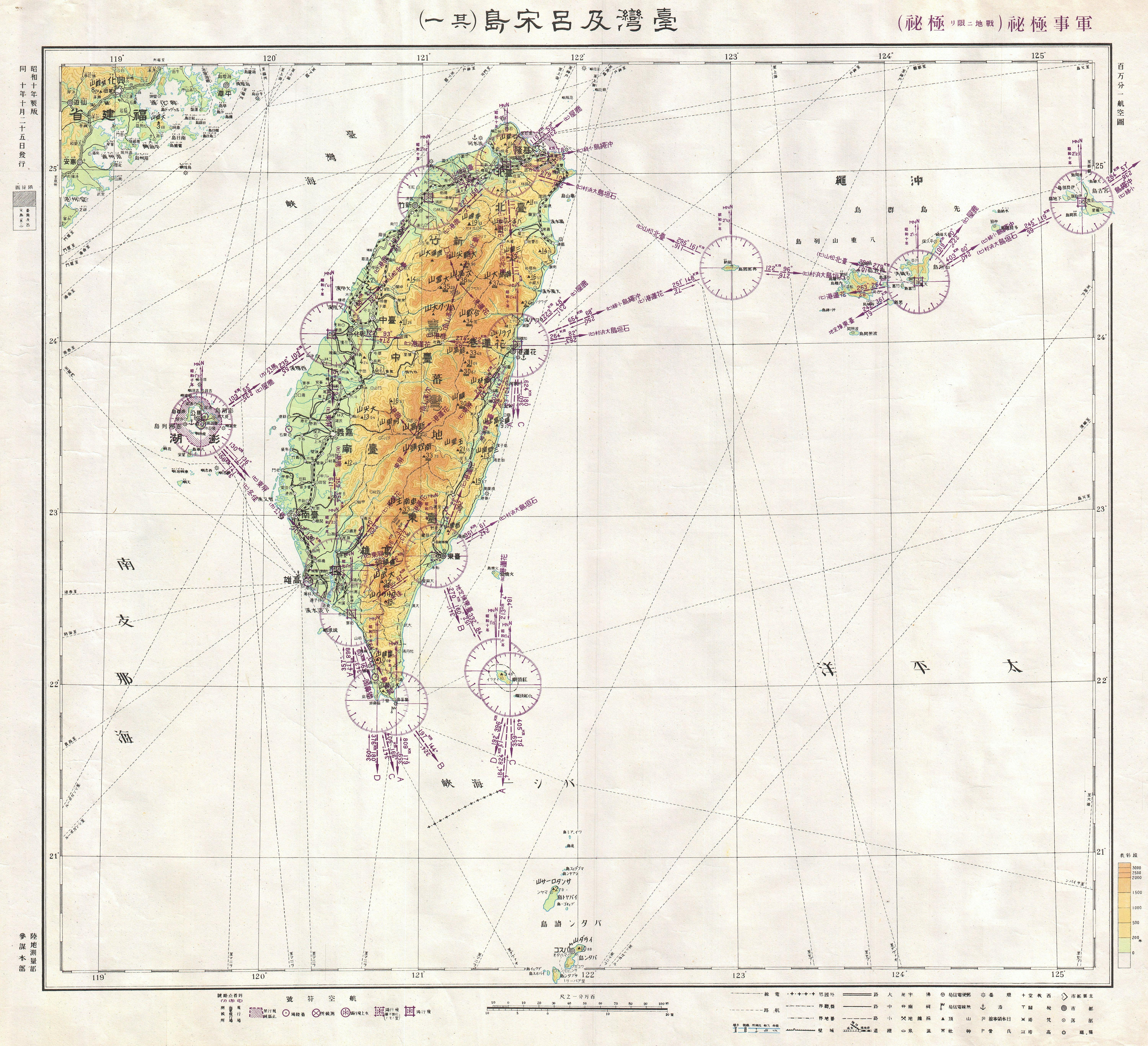
Japanese map including Xiaori Island (labeled as 紅日島) (1943)

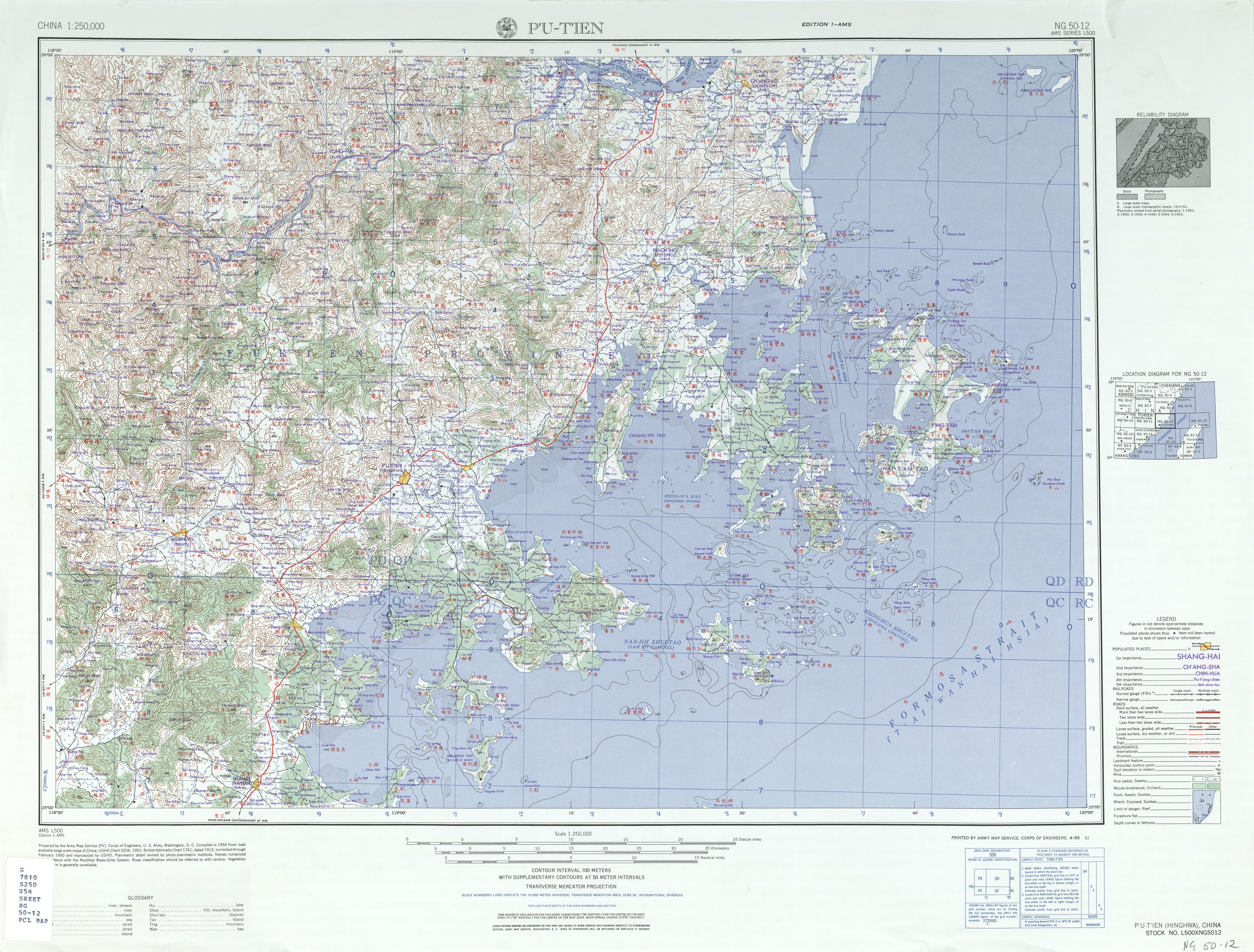
Map including Xiaori Island (labeled as Hsiao-jih Tao 小日島) (AMS, 1954)

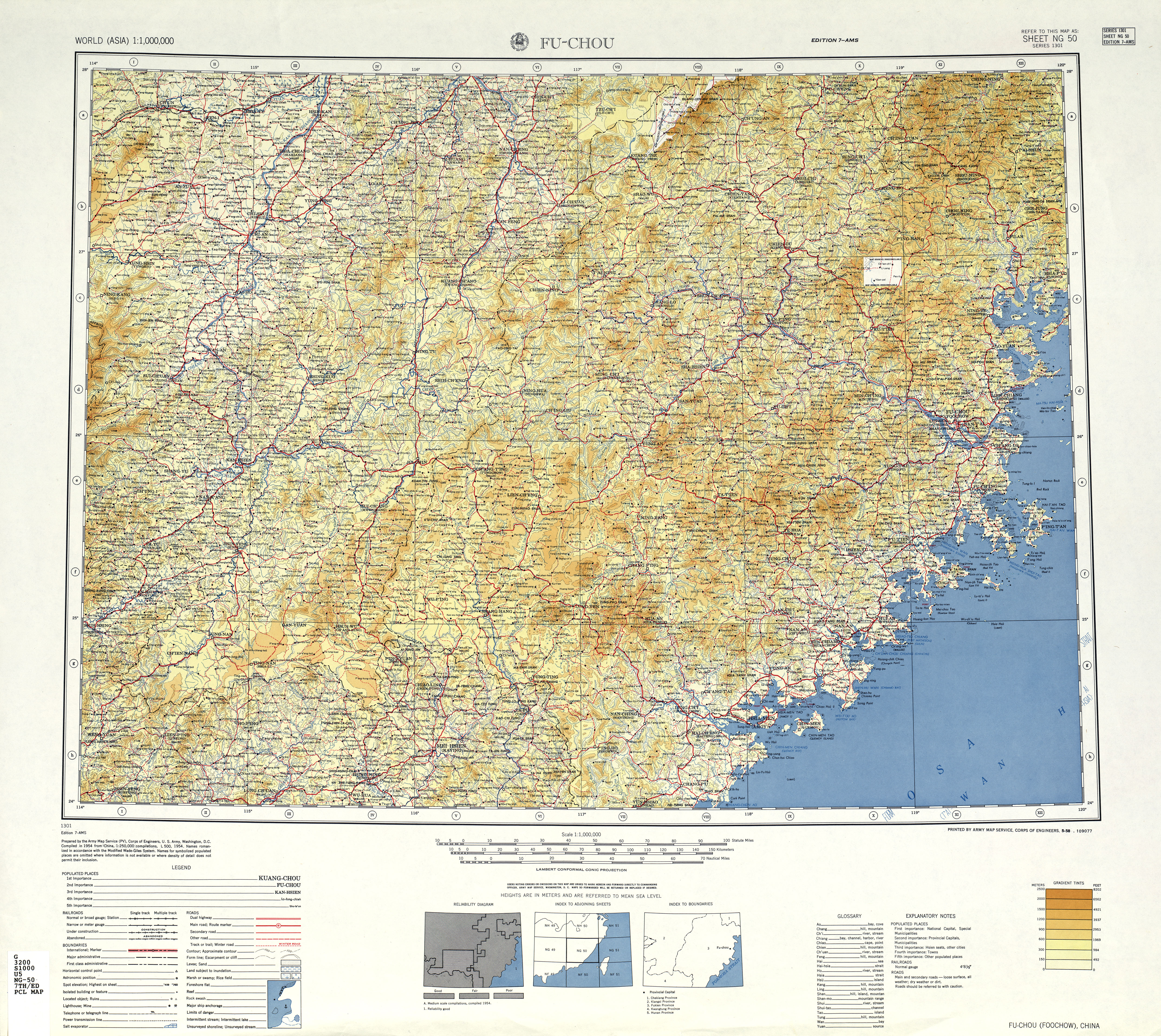
Map including Xiaori Island (labeled as Hsiao-jih Tao (Red Yit)) (AMS, 1954)

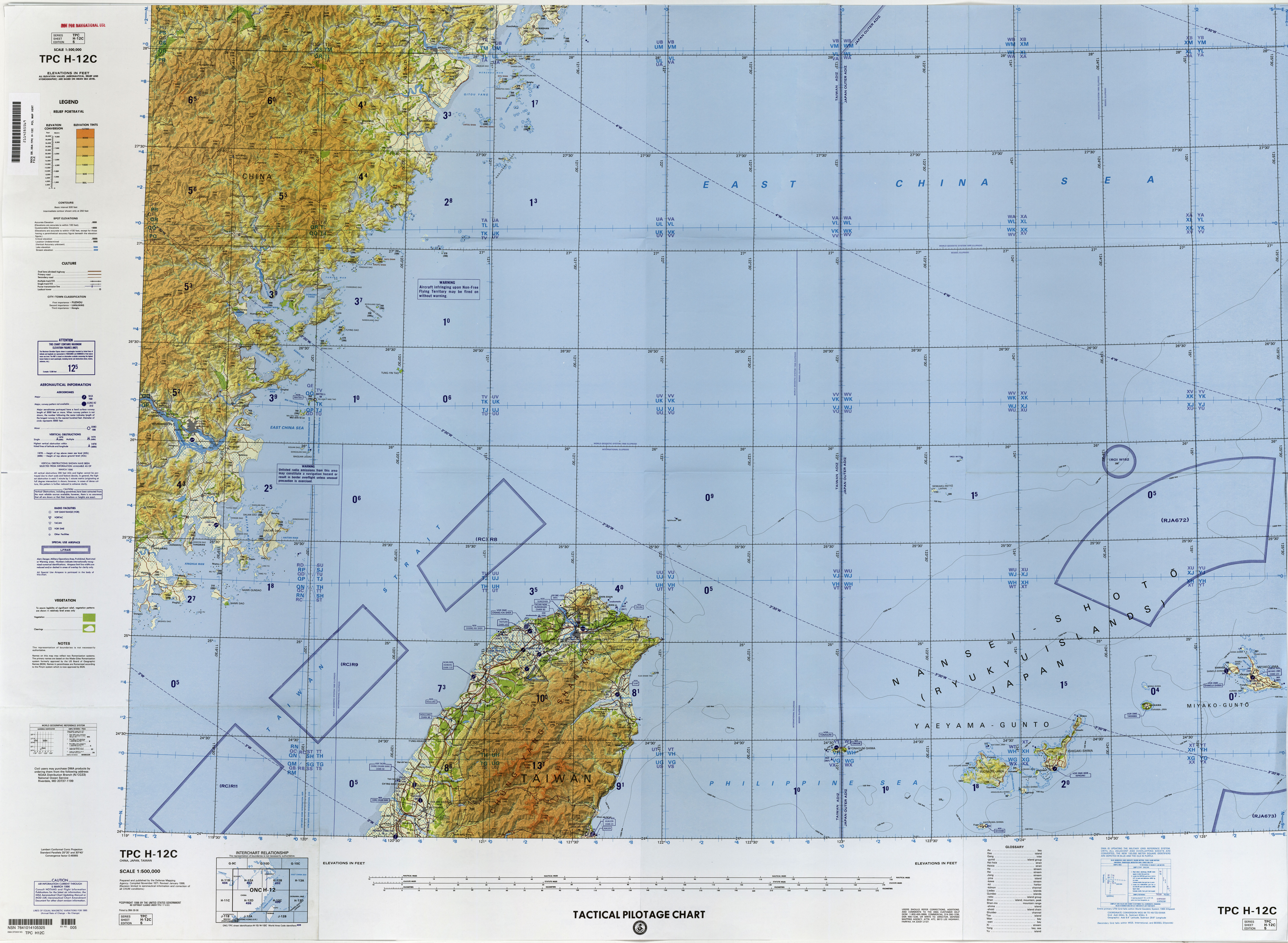
Map including Xiaori Island (unlabeled) (DMA, compiled 1971, revised 1996)

== See also ==
- List of islands of China
