= Nanri Island =

Island of Fujian

Coordinates: 25.202288°N 119.498077°E

Native name: 南日岛
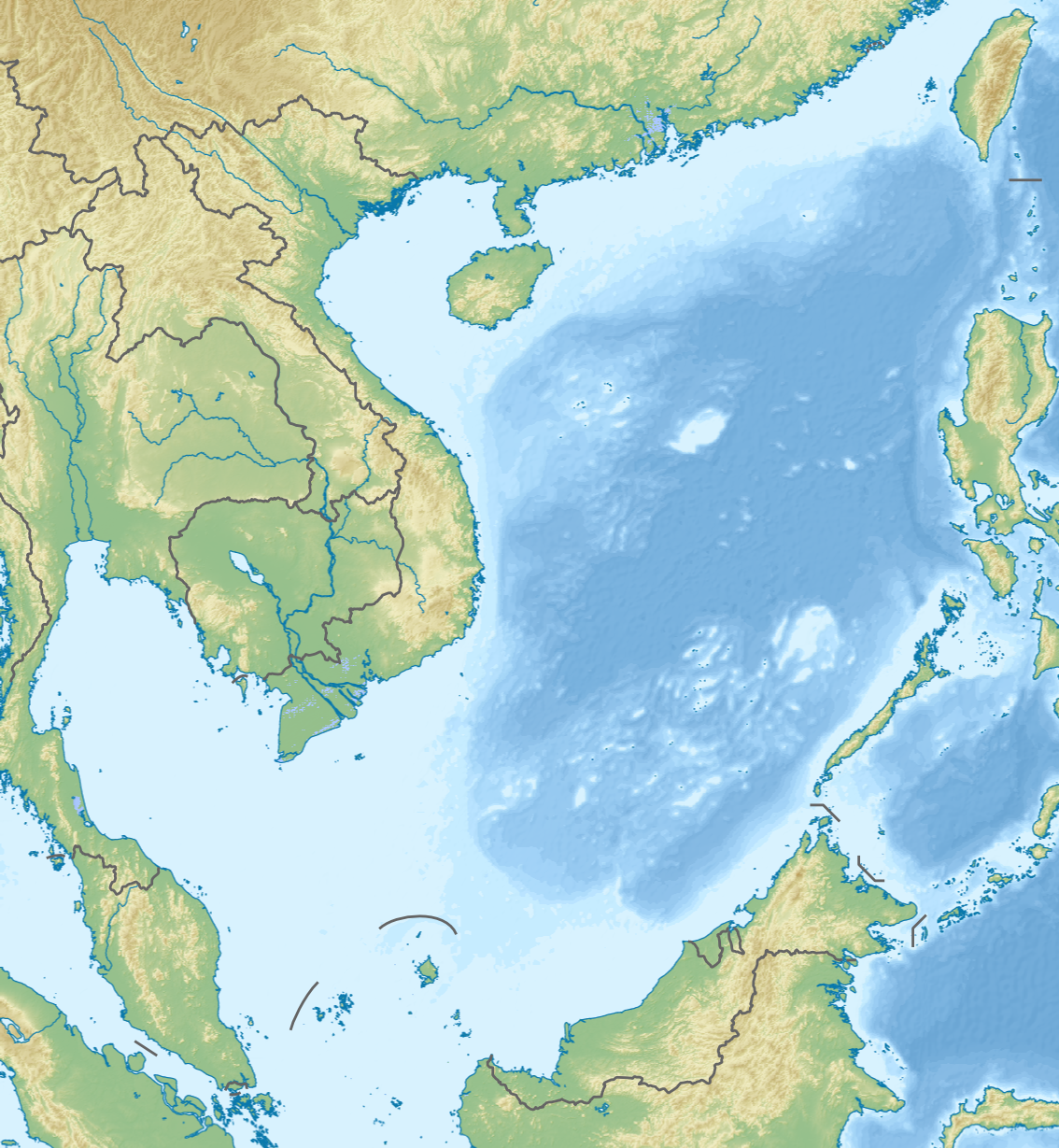
- Location in the Taiwan Strait Nanri Island (Southeast Asia) Nanri Island (Asia)

Geography
- Location: In the Taiwan Strait, southeast of the Asian mainland in Nanri Town, Xiuyu District, Putian, Fujian, China
- Area: 42.1 km^{2} (16.3 sq mi)

Administration
- China
- Province: Fujian
- Prefecture-level city: Putian
- District: Xiuyu
- Town: Nanri

Additional information
- Time zone: China Standard (UTC+8)

Location of Nanri Island

Nanri Island (Chinese: simplified Chinese: 南日岛; traditional Chinese: 南日島), Nanjisü, Nanjih, historically known as Nanni Shan (南匿山) and Nanri Shan (南日山), is a small island off the coast of China. Nanri Town (南日镇) is an administrative unit of Xiuyu District, Putian, Fujian, People's Republic of China which includes 111 islands and islets. The island has more than 50 thousand inhabitants.

== History ==
In October 1952, the island was the site of the Battle of Nanri Island between the People's Liberation Army and the Republic of China Army; the engagement ended in an ROC victory and resulted in the ROC occupying Nanri. However, ROC forces later withdrew to Taiwan, and the island was re-occupied by the People's Republic of China.

== Administrative divisions ==
The town of Nanri (which includes nearby islands) is divided into seventeen villages:

- Haishan (海山村), Yunwan (云万村), Yanxia (岩下村), Shipan (石盘村), Shanchu (山初村), Wanfeng (万峰村), Sandun (三墩村), Xigao (西高村), Shayang (沙洋村), Gangnan (港南村), Fuye (浮叶村), Houye (后叶村), Dongdai (东岱村), Xiaori (小日村), Aoyu (鳌屿村, also known as Ta-ao Hsü (大嶅㠘)), Luopan (罗盘村), Chishan (赤山村)

Other populated places include Fou-tou (浮斗), Hsi-hu (西户), Hsi-kao, Ts'ao-hu, T'ou-ying-shih (頭英石), Ts'u-shan (粗山), Shih-t'ou-p'an and Shang-t'ou.

== Economy ==
The island is heavily involved in the fishing industry, and several fish farms have been established off the coast of the island. The island's mudflats are cultivated for seaweed and kelp production. Other important sectors are tourism and the energy sector. In 2015, a wind farm was established on the island.

== Gallery ==
Maps including Nanri Island:

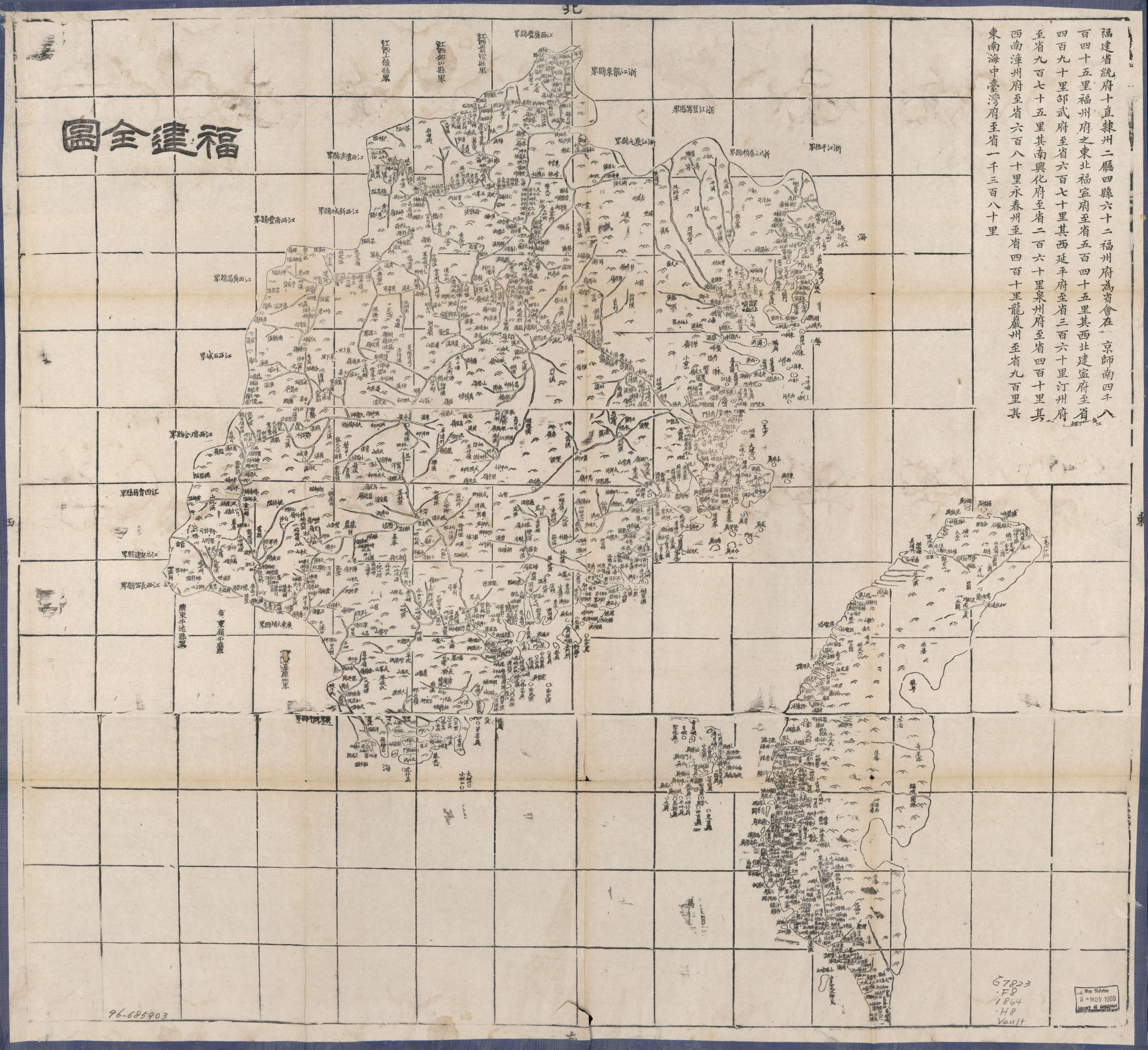
Map including Nanri Island (labeled as 南日嶼)

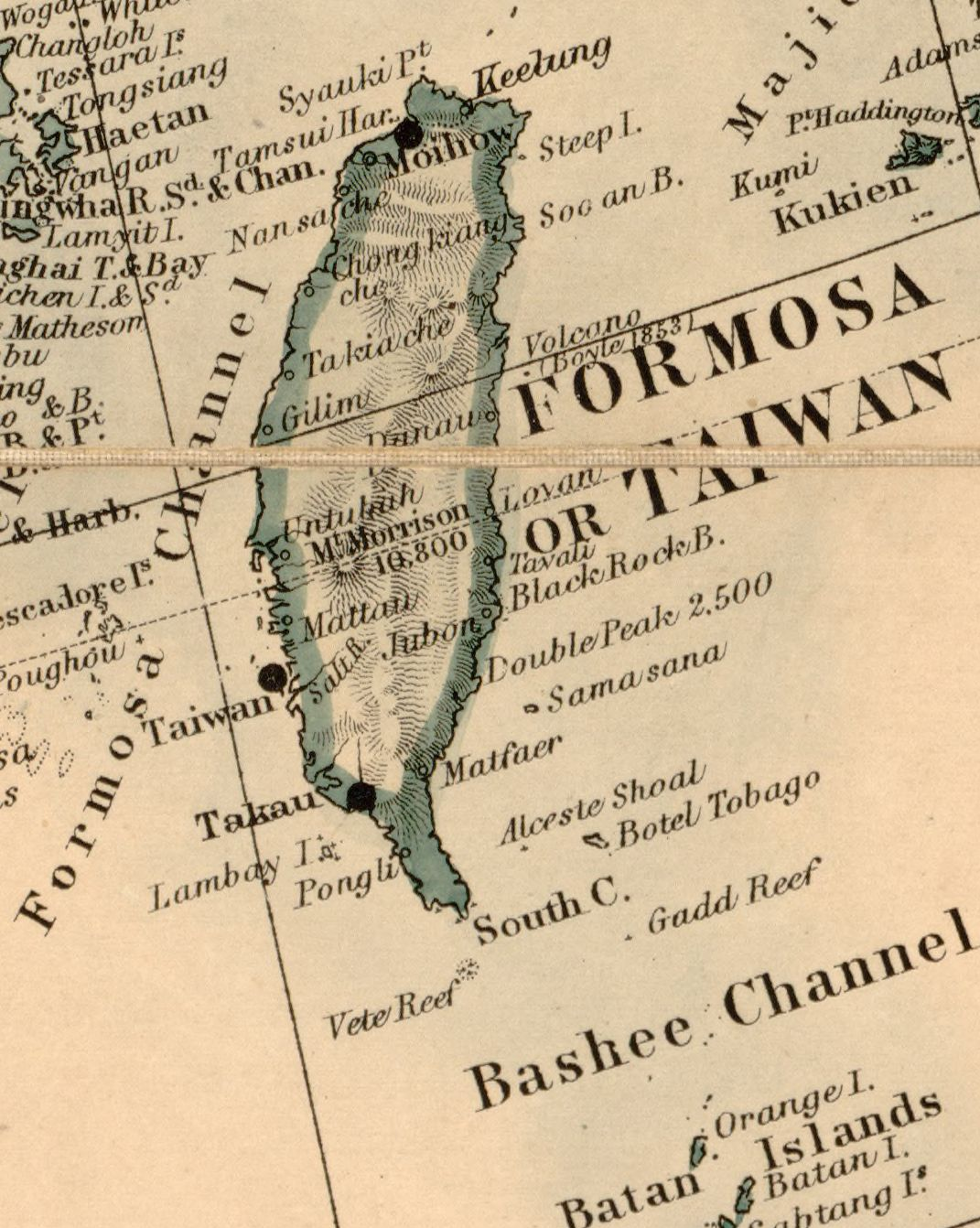
Map of the area including Lamyit I. (Nanjih or Nanri Island) (1880)

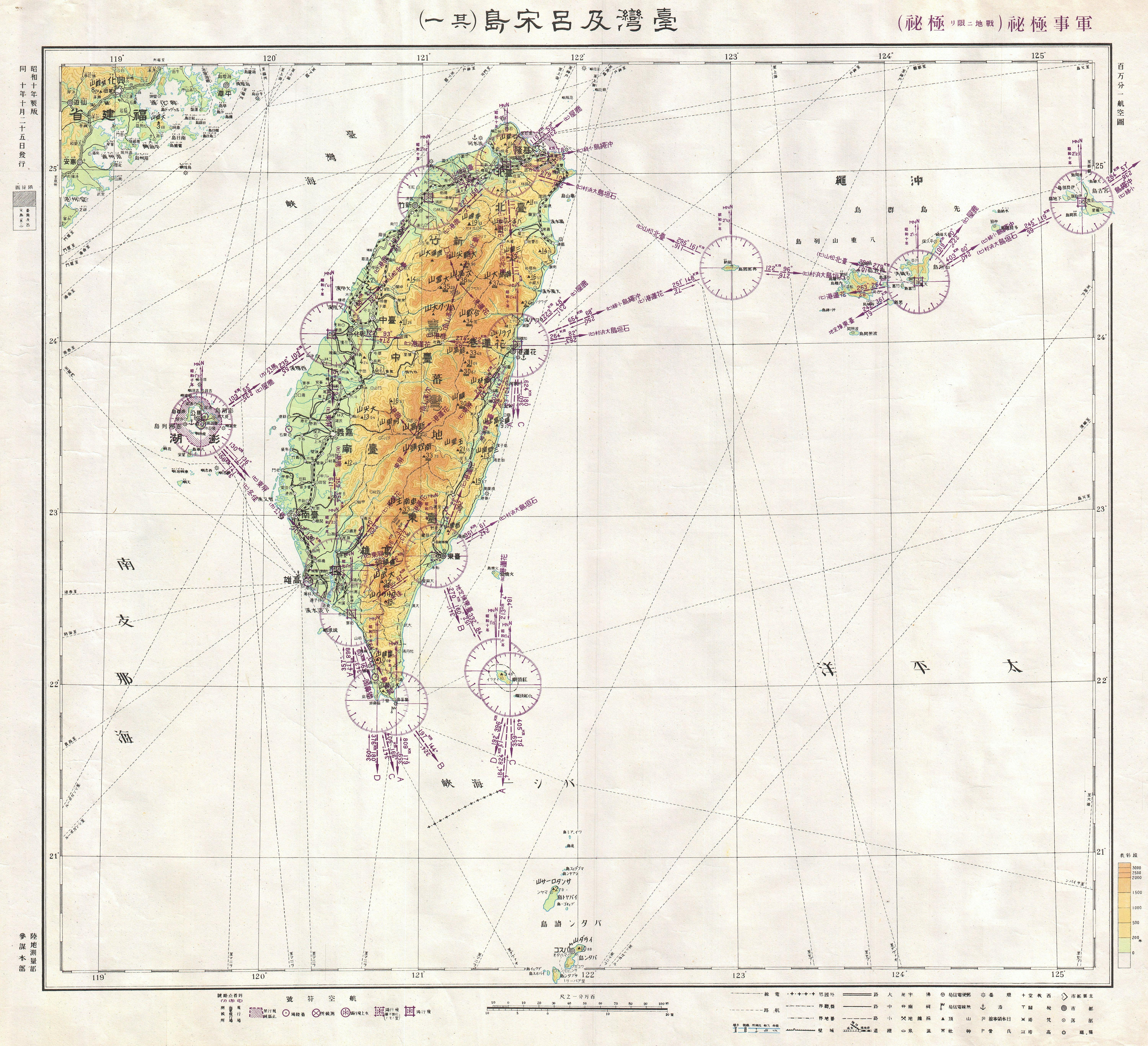
Japanese map including Nanri Island (labeled as 南日島) (1943)

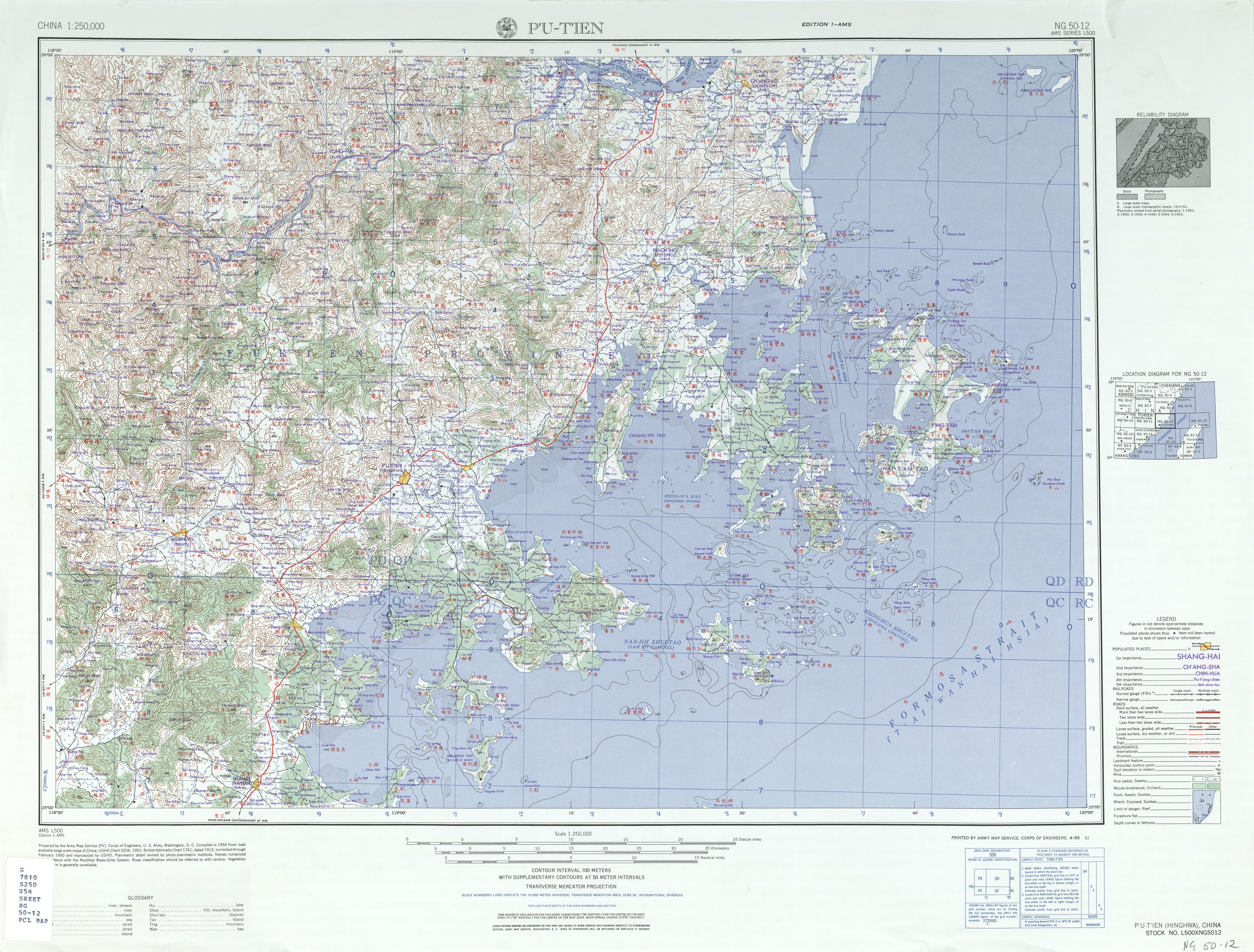
Map including Nanri Island (labeled as NAN-JIH TAO 南日島) (AMS, 1954)

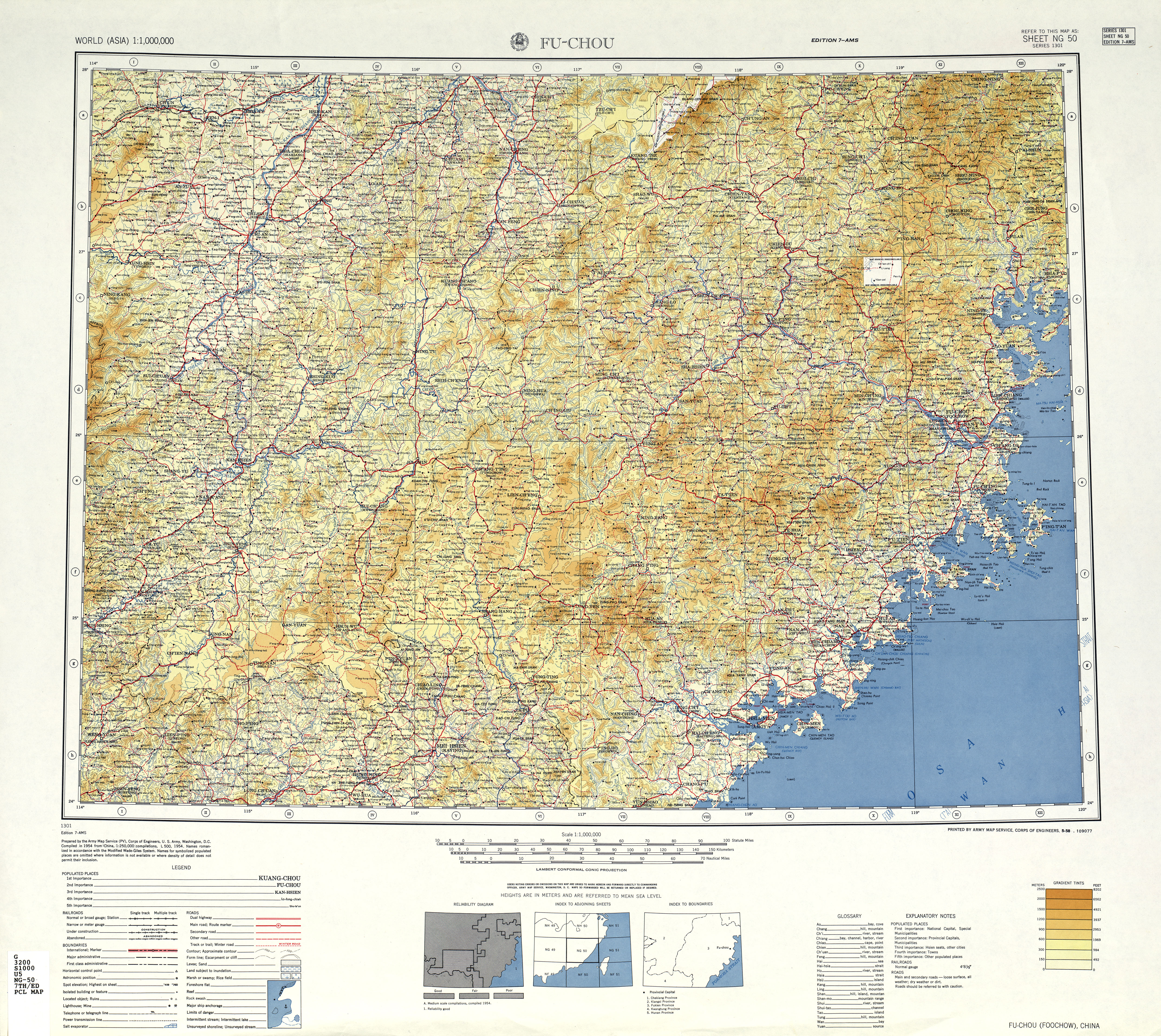
Map including Nanri Island (labeled as Nan-jih Tao (Lam Yit)) (AMS, 1954)

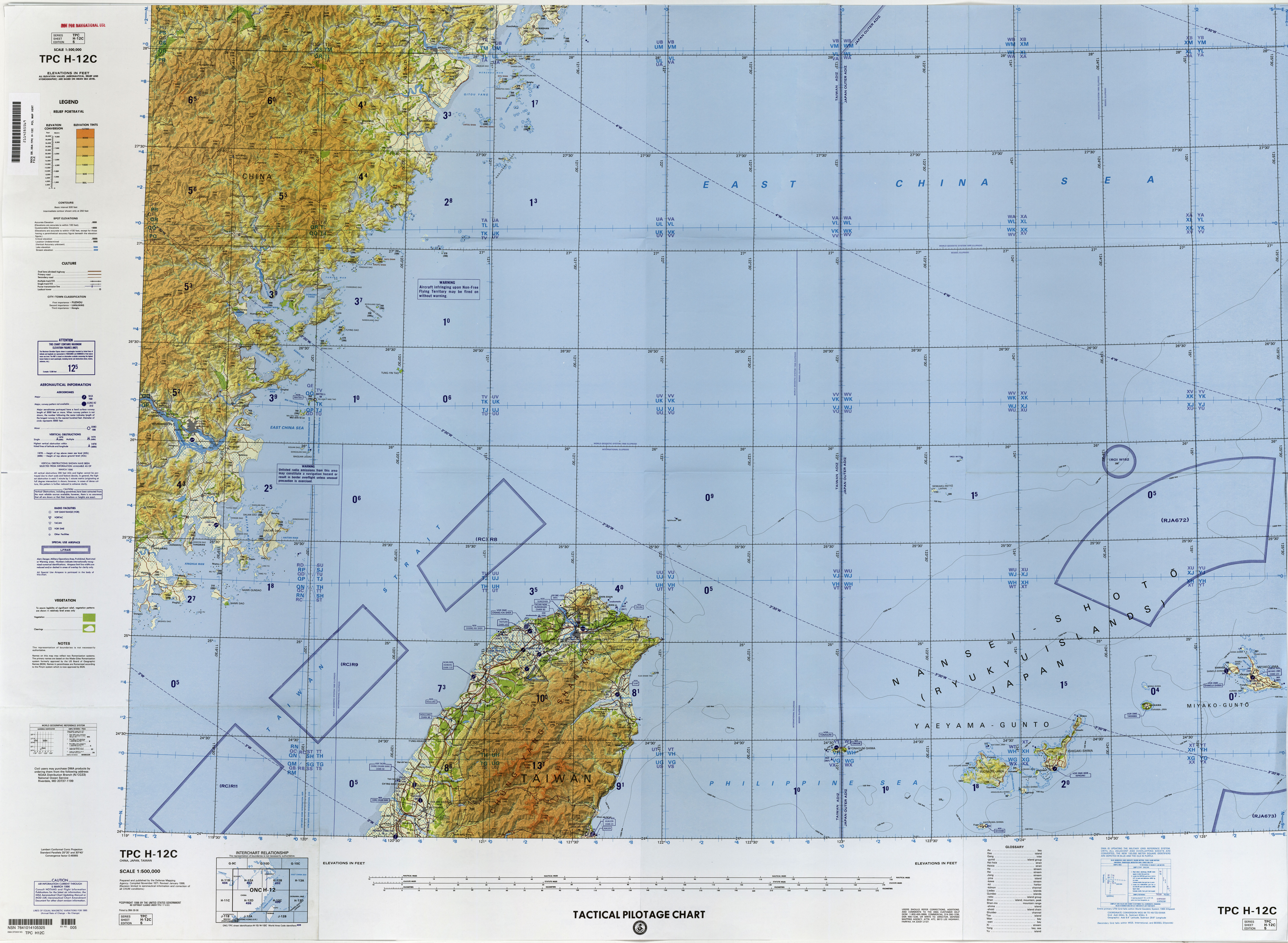
Map including Nanri Island (labeled as NANRI DAO) (DMA, compiled 1971, revised 1996)
