= Meizhou Island =

Island off the coast of Fujian, China

Coordinates: 25.076°N 119.122°E

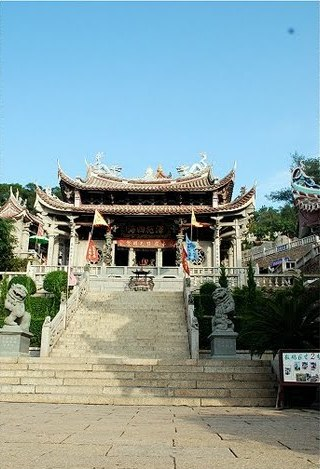
The Heavenly Empress Palace-Meizhou Ancestral Temple

Meizhou Island (simplified Chinese: 湄洲岛; traditional Chinese: 湄洲島; pinyin: Méizhōu Dǎo; Pu-Xian Min: Mî-ciu-doh), Meichow; Meichou, is a small island close to the coast of China. Meizhou Town (湄洲镇) is an administrative unit of Xiuyu District, Putian, Fujian, China. It is known for being the birthplace of the goddess Mazu. Meizhou has 38,000 inhabitants, most of whom are involved in the fishing industry. The local language spoken is Pu-Xian Min.

== History ==
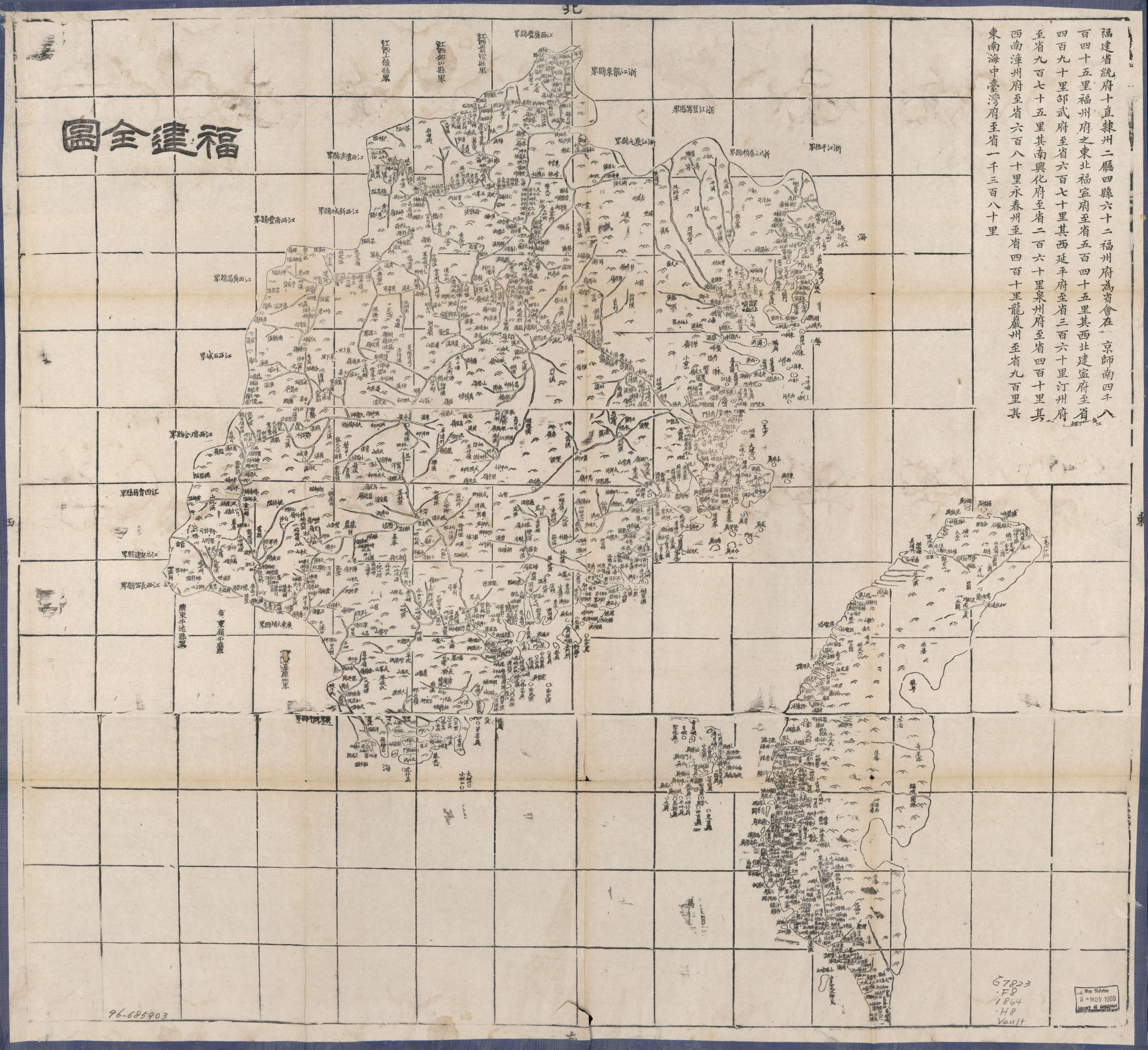
Meizhou (written as 湄州㠘)

An open provincial tourism economic region (旅游经济区) since June 1988, in April 1992 Meizhou Island introduced a landing visa policy for visitors from Taiwan. In October of the same year it became a national tourism-vacation region (国家旅游度假区). The island was formally opened to visitors from overseas in October 1999.

Annually, Taiwanese pilgrims come to Meizhou to see the place where Mazu once lived. Under Xi Jinping, Mazu-related pilgrimages have become an avenue for Chinese Communist Party influence operations to promote Chinese unification.

== Administration ==
Meizhou Island is administered by Meizhou Town, an area that is divided into 11 villages:

- Gaozhu (高朱)
- Xiashan (下山) "Downhill"
- Lianche (莲池) "Lotus Pond"
- Beidai (北埭 dài) "North Dam"
- Dongcai (东蔡) "The East Cais"
- Xiting (西亭) "The Western Pavilion"
- Ganglou (港楼) "The Tower by the Port"
- Zhaixia (寨下) "Lower Village"
- Dayang (大洋) "Great Ocean"

along with three others.

== Geography ==
Located in the northern part of the mouth of Meizhou Bay, Meizhou Island covers an area of 14.35 km^{2} (5.54 sq mi) and measures 9.6 kilometres (6.0 mi) north-south, and 1.3 kilometres (0.81 mi) east-west. The beach runs for around 20 kilometres (12 mi).

== Tourist attractions ==
The Heavenly Empress Palace-Meizhou Ancestral Temple (天后宮湄洲祖廟) began as a small shrine soon after Mazu's death in the 10th century. It has now been renovated and greatly enlarged to accommodate pilgrims.

== See also ==
- List of islands of China
