= Kaiyuan =

Kaiyuan is a word from Chinese phonetic alphabet (pinyin) with multiple meaning due to different forms of Chinese characters. It may refer to:

== Places ==
- Kaiyuan, Liaoning (开原), a county-level city in Liaoning, China
- Kaiyuan, Yunnan (开远), a county-level city in Yunnan
- Kaiyuan Subdistrict, Xiamen (开元街道), a subdistrict in Siming District, Xiamen, Fujian
  - Kaiyuan District (开元区), former district in Xiamen, Fujian
- Kaiyuan, Shulan (开原镇), town in Shulan, Jilin
- Kaiyuan, Dingzhou (开元|镇), in Dingzhou

== Other uses ==
- Kaiyuan era (713-741), early in the reign of Emperor Xuanzong of the Tang Dynasty
- Kaiyuan Za Bao, the Tang Dynasty's official publication during the Kaiyuan era
- Kaiyuan coin, a standard coin of the Tang Dynasty
- Kaiyuan Temple (disambiguation) (开元寺), the name of various Chinese temples
