= Beigao Town =

Coordinates: 25.3425°N 119.1436°E

Beigao 北高镇
- Town
- Location in Fujian
- Country: People's Republic of China
- Province: Fujian
- Prefecture-level city: Putian

Area
  - Total: 54 km^{2} (21 sq mi)

Population (2010)
  - Total: 93,684
  - Density: 1,700/km^{2} (4,500/sq mi)
- Time zone: UTC+8 (China Standard)

Beigao
- Chinese: 北高
- Literal meaning: Northern Height(s)
Transcriptions
Standard Mandarin
- Hanyu Pinyin: Běigāo

Beigao Town is a town in Putian's Licheng District on the central coast of Fujian Province, China. It had 93,684 people in about 16,000 households during the 2010 census.

== Geography ==
Beigao comprises part of the southern shore of Xinghua Bay on the Taiwan Strait and its hinterland. Its 54 square kilometers (21 sq mi) form the southeastern corner of Putian's prefecture, bordering Houhai Lake and Quanzhou.

== Administrative divisions ==
Beigao is composed of 24 villages: Kengyuan (坑园村, Kēngyuán Cūn), Yuanhou (院后村, Yuànhòu Cūn), Chengshan (呈山村, Chéngshān Cūn), Beigao (北高村, Běigāo Cūn), Dongxiang (东乡村, Dōngxiāng Cūn), Houji (后积村, Hòujī Cūn), Tingjiang (汀江村, Tīngjiāng Cūn), Tingfeng (汀峰村, Tīngfēng Cūn), Jiangbian (江边村, Jiāngbiān Cūn), Gaoyang (高洋村, Gāoyáng Cūn), Gaofeng (高峰村, Gāofēng Cūn), Lanshan (栏山村, Lánshān Cūn), Fuling (福岭村, Fúlǐng Cūn), Duling (渡岭村, Dùlǐng Cūn), Wucheng (吴城村, Wúchéng Cūn), Shanqian (山前村, Shānqián Cūn), Chengtou (埕头村, Chéngtóu Cūn), Chengqian (埕前村, Chéngqián Cūn), Qianting (前亭村, Qiántíng Cūn), Chongqin (冲沁村, Chōngqìn Cūn), Donggao (东皋村, Dōnggāo Cūn), Zhuzhuang (竹庄村, Zhúzhuāng Cūn), Meilan (美兰村, Měilán Cūn), and Daifeng (岱峰村, Dàifēng Cūn). These oversee 128 zìráncūn (自然村) and 248 cūnmín xiǎozǔ (村民小组).
