= Yuanmiao Temple =

Yuanmiao Temple (simplified Chinese: 元妙观; traditional Chinese: 元妙觀; pinyin: Yuánmiào Guàn), may refer to:

- Yuanmiao Temple (Putian), in Putian, Fujian, China
- Yuanmiao Temple (Huizhou), in Huizhou, Fujian, China
