= Huangshi (disambiguation) =

Huangshi is a city in Hubei, China.

Huangshi may also refer to the Mandarin Chinese pinyin transliterations of two similarly pronounced names (黄石 Huángshí [yellow stone] and 黄市 Huángshì):

== Subdistricts ==
- Huangshi Subdistrict (黄石街道), Baiyun District, Guangzhou, Guangdong

== Towns ==
There are numerous towns referred to as Huangshi, often with the identical Chinese name "黄石镇":

- Huangshi, in Yunyang County, Chongqing
- Huangshi, Licheng District, Putian, Fujian
- Huangshi, Longchuan County, Heyan, Guangdong
- Huangshi, Ningdu County, Ganzhou, Jiangxi
- Huangshi, Leiyang, Hengyang, Hunan
- Huangshi, Taoyuan County, Changde, Hunan
- Huangshi (黄市), Yantan District, Zigong, Sichuan

== Townships ==
- Huangshi Township (黄市乡), Miluo City, Yueyang, Hunan
- Huangshi Township (黄石乡), Xuanhan County, Dazhou, Sichuan

== Other places ==
- Wong Shek, a hill on the Sai Kung Peninsula, Tai Po District, Hong Kong

== Historical eras ==
- Huangshi (皇始, 351–355), era name used by Fu Jian (317–355), emperor of Former Qin
- Huangshi (皇始, 396–398), era name used by Emperor Daowu of Northern Wei

== See also ==
- Yellowstone (disambiguation)
