= Qiaodou Village =

Village in Fujian, China

Qiaodou 桥兜村
- Village
- Location in Fujian
- Coordinates: 25°18′26″N 119°12′15″E
- Country: People's Republic of China
- Province: Fujian
- Prefecture-level city: Putian
- District: Licheng
- Town: Huangshi

Population (2010)
  - Total: 1,000
- Time zone: UTC+8 (China Standard)

Qiaodou
- Traditional Chinese: 橋兜
- Simplified Chinese: 桥兜
Transcriptions
Standard Mandarin
- Hanyu Pinyin: Qiáodōu

Former names

Ninghai
- Traditional Chinese: 寧海
- Simplified Chinese: 宁海
- Literal meaning: Pacifying the Sea(s); Pacified Sea(s)
Transcriptions
Standard Mandarin
- Hanyu Pinyin: Nínghǎi

Qiaodou Village is a village under the administration of Huangshi in Putian's Licheng District on the central coast of Fujian Province, China. It had about 1,000 people during the 2010 census.

== Geography ==
Qiaodou lies on the southern Putian Plain northwest of the Houhai bay or lake.

== History ==
Qiaodou was known as Ninghai during the Song and Ming. It is still home to the ancient stone Ninghai Bridge over a branch of the Mulan.

== Religion ==
Qiaodou is the site of the earliest-attested temple to the Chinese sea goddess Mazu, the deified form of the 10th-century shamaness Lin Moniang. Supposedly, Lin was born on nearby Meizhou Island, usually regarded as the cradle of her cult, but she probably spent her adult life on the mainland. In 1086, she joined the deities venerated at the town's "Holy Mound" (圣墩, Shengdun) after appearing to the villagers in their dreams following a series of mysterious lights at the mound.

The main temple in the Qiaodou area today is the Jiucha Temple (纠察庙) honoring the Great God of Jiucha (纠察大神). Its religious processions occur on the second and third days of the second lunar month.
