= Guangxiao Temple (Putian) =

Buddhist temple in Putian, China

- 光孝寺
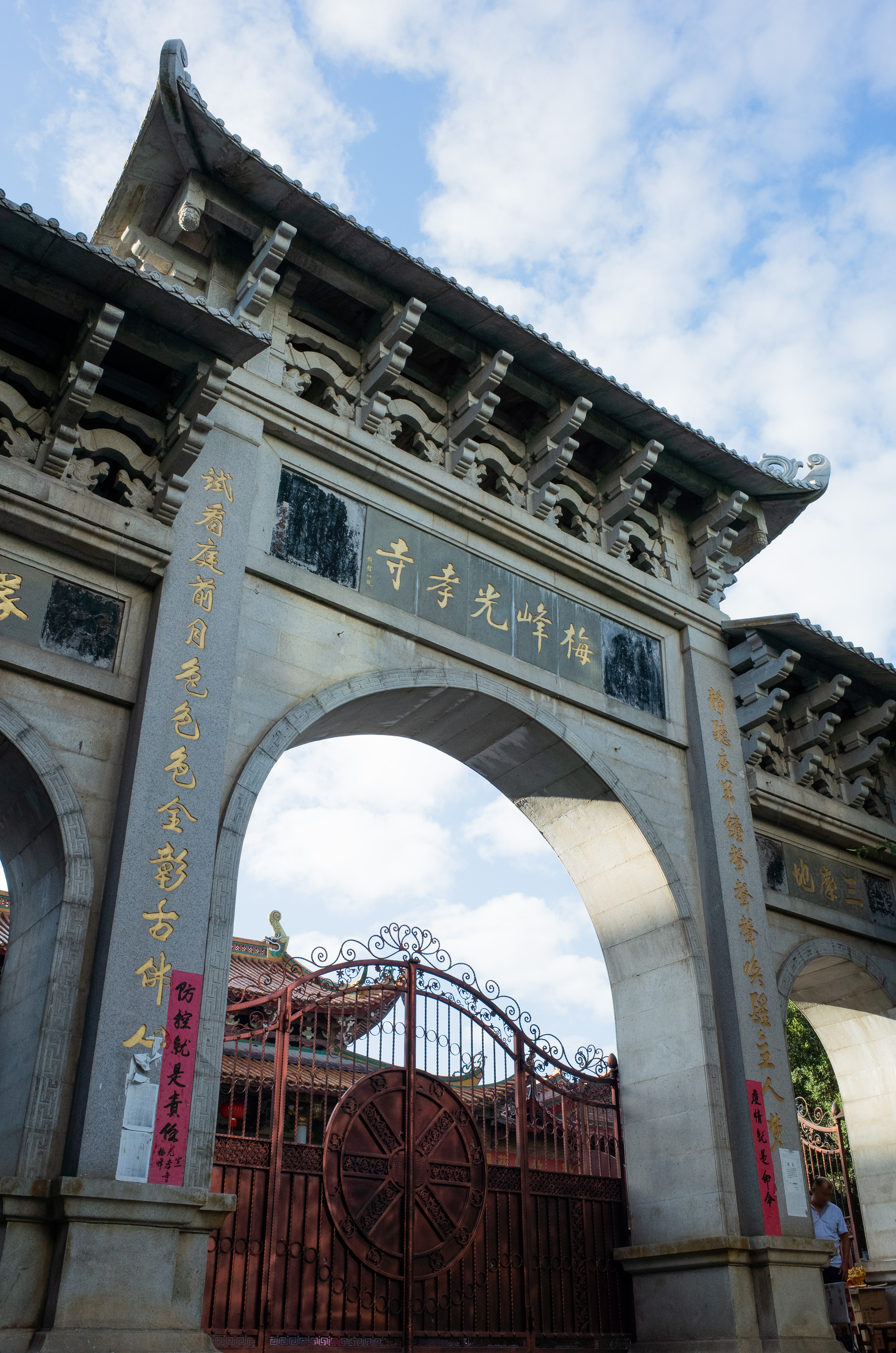

- Location within Fujian

Religion
- Affiliation: Buddhism
- Sect: Chan Buddhism
- Leadership: Shi Jiezhou (Chinese: 释戒舟)

Location
- Location: Chengxiang District, Putian, Fujian
- Country: China
- Coordinates: 25°26′32″N 119°01′13″E

Architecture
- Style: Chinese architecture
- Founder: Li Pangu
- Established: 1085 (李泮固)
- Completed: 1980s (reconstruction)

Guangxiao Temple (Chinese: 光孝寺; pinyin: Guāngxiào Sì) is a Buddhist temple located in Chengxiang District of Putian, Fujian, China. It has been burned down and rebuilt a number of times, due to the natural disasters and wars. The present version was completed in the 1980s. Alongside Guanghua Temple, Guishan Temple and Nangshan Temple, it is hailed as one of the "Four Famous Buddhist Temples in Puyang".

== History ==
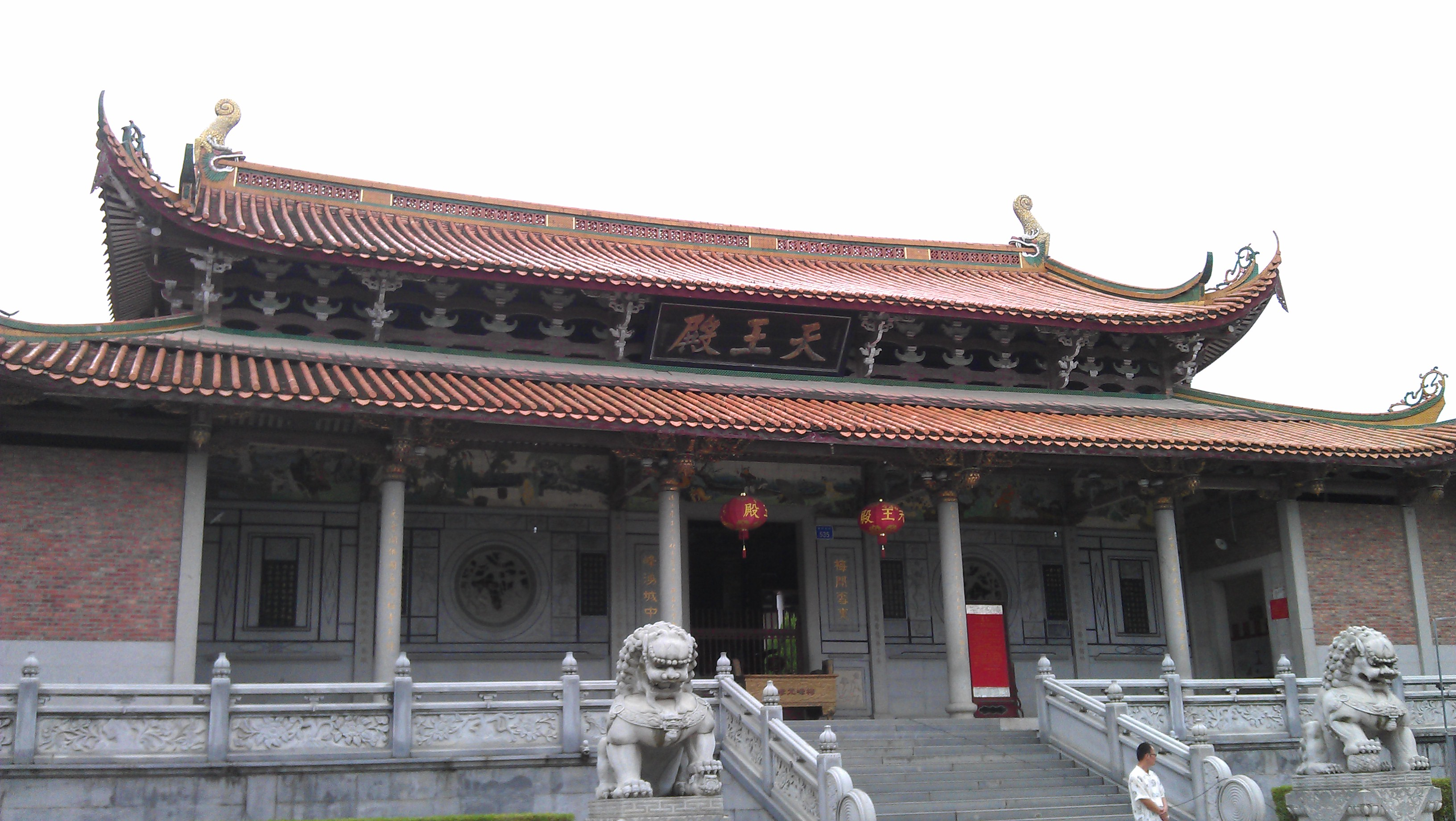
The Four Heavenly Kings Hall at Guangxiao Temple.

=== Sui dynasty ===
The temple traces its origins to the former Guanyin Pavilion (观音亭), founded in the Sui dynasty (589–618).

=== Song dynasty ===
In 1085, in the 8th year of Yuanfeng era (1078–1085) of the Song dynasty (960–1279), Li Pangu (李泮固), a landlord of Mount Mei, donated more than 100 mu lands to establish a Buddhist temple when he got a son after worshiping Guanyin.

In 1103, in the 2nd year of Chongning (1102–1106), Emperor Huizong inscribed a plaque with Chinese characters "Buddhist State in Meilin" (梅林佛国) to the temple. In the following year, he renamed the temple "Chongning Chan Temple" (崇宁禅寺). In 1111, in the 1st year of Zhenghe period (1111–1118), Emperor Huizong changed it name into "Tianning Wanshou Temple" (天宁万寿寺). The temple was renovated and redecorated by abbot Huizhao (惠照).

In 1137, in the 7th year of Shaoxing period (1131–1162), Emperor Gaozong honored the name "Bao'en Guangxiao Temple" (报恩光孝寺), more commonly known as "Guangxiao Temple", this name has been used to date. Eighteen years later, abbot Huaixiu (怀琇) asked ironworker Cai Tong (蔡通) to cast a bronze bell. When the bell rings, the toll can be heard very far away.

=== Ming dynasty ===
In 1408, in the 6th year of Yongle era (1402–1424) of the Ming dynasty (1368–1644), abbot Guiyong (规永) restored the temple.

In 1562, in the reign of Jiajing Emperor (1522–1566), the Japanese pirates set a fire to demolish the temple. Most of its buildings were burned down, only the Mahavira Hall and Drum tower survived.

In 1578, in the 6th year of Wanli period (1573–1620), abbot Yuezhen (月珍) rebuilt the temple, KKitchen, Dharma Hall, Shanmen, Hall of Sangharama Palace and Zhanbai Pavilion (瞻拜亭) were gradually added to the temple.

=== Qing dynasty ===
During the Qing dynasty (1644–1911), Guangxiao Temple underwent three renovations, respectively in the ruling of Shunzhi Emperor (1644–1661) and in the reign of Kangxi Emperor (1662–1722) and in the Yongzheng era (1723–1735).

In 1887, in the 13th year of Guangxu period (1875–1908), the Song dynasty bronze bell was melted down while the Bell tower caught fire and in ruins. Twelve years later, Weijia (微嘉) was proposed as the new abbot of Guangxiao Temple. He raised funds to restore the Mahavira Hall, Abbot's Room, Reception Hall, Bell tower, Drum tower, Hall of Skanda and Meditation Hall. And a new bell was cast. It is 1.64-metre (5 ft 5 in) high and weights over 1,500-kilogram (3,300 lb), its outer diameter is 1.04-metre (3 ft 5 in). Outside the bell engraved 543 words of Nīlakaṇṭha Dhāraṇī and Bell Mantra.

=== People's Republic of China ===
After the establishment of the Communist State, the Fujian Provincial Government provided great protection for Guangxiao Temple.

In 1966, Mao Zedong launched the Cultural Revolution, Guangxiao Temple was completely destroyed by the Red Guards with only the Qing dynasty bell remaining.

After the 3rd Plenary Session of the 11th Central Committee of the Chinese Communist Party, according to the national policy of free religious belief, Guangxiao Temple was officially reopened to the public. A modern restoration of the entire temple complex was carried out in 1980 and lasted ten years. Guangxiao Temple has been designated as a National Key Buddhist Temple in Han Chinese Area by the State Council of China in 1983.

== Architecture ==
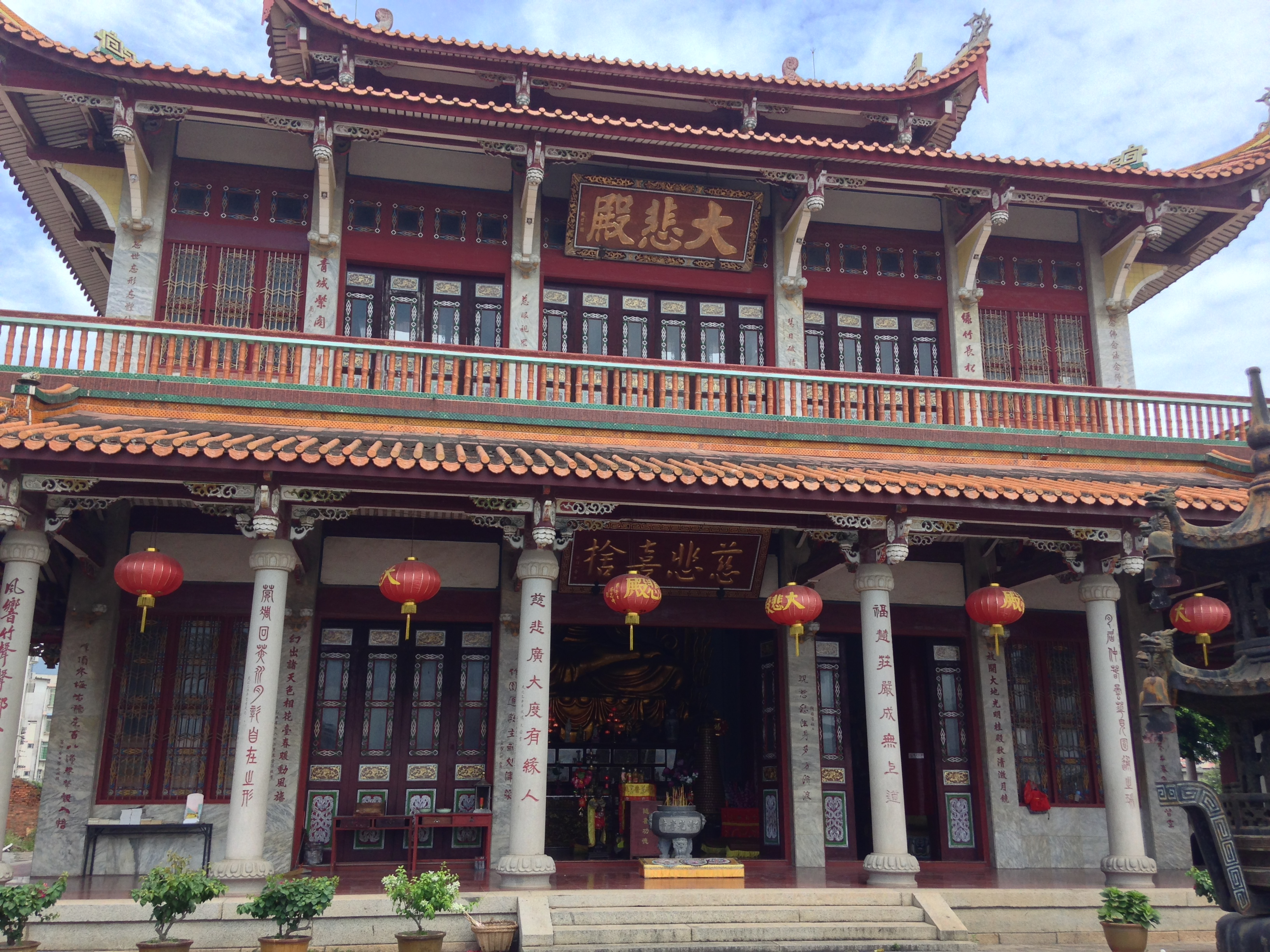
The Great Compassion Hall at Guangxiao Temple.

Guangxiao Temple occupies a building area of 18,000 square metres (190,000 sq ft) and the total area including temple lands, forests and mountains is over 53,000 square metres (570,000 sq ft).

Guangxiao Temple is built along the up and down of mountains and divided into the central, east and west routes. Along the central axis are the Shanmen, Four Heavenly Kings Hall, Zhanbai Pavilion, Mahavira Hall, Dharma Hall and Great Compassion Hall. There are over ten halls and rooms on both sides, including Guru Hall, Abbot's Hall, Monastic Dining Hall, Monastic Reception Hall, Bell tower, Drum tower and Meditation Hall.

=== Great Compassion Hall ===
The Great Compassion Hall is 22 metres (72 ft) high with triple-eaves gable and hip roof. A 14.2-metre (47 ft) tall sitting statue of Guanyin is enshrined in the middle of the hall.
