= Licheng =

Licheng may refer to the following locations:

- Licheng County (黎城县), of Changzhi, Shanxi
- Licheng District, Jinan (历城区), Shandong
- Licheng District, Putian (荔城区), Fujian
- Licheng District, Quanzhou (鲤城区), Fujian
- Licheng Subdistrict, Xianyou County (鲤城街道), Fujian
- Licheng Subdistrict, Guangzhou (荔城街道), subdivision of Zengcheng District, Guangzhou, Guangdong
- Licheng, Guangxi (荔城镇), town in and subdivision of Lipu County, Guangxi
- Licheng, Jinhu County (黎城镇), town in and subdivision of Jinhu County, Jiangsu
- Licheng, Liyang (溧城镇), town in and subdivision of Liyang, Jiangsu
