= Kuang-hsiao Temple =

Kuang-hsiao Temple may refer to:

- Guangxiao Temple (Guangzhou), in Guangzhou, Guangdong, China
- Guangxiao Temple (Putian), in Putian, Fujian, China
- Guangxiao Temple (Jian'ou), in Jian'ou, Fujian, China
- Guangxiao Temple (Taizhou), in Taizhou, Jiangsu, China
