= Yuanmiao Temple (Putian) =

Former Taoist temple in Putian, China

- 元妙观
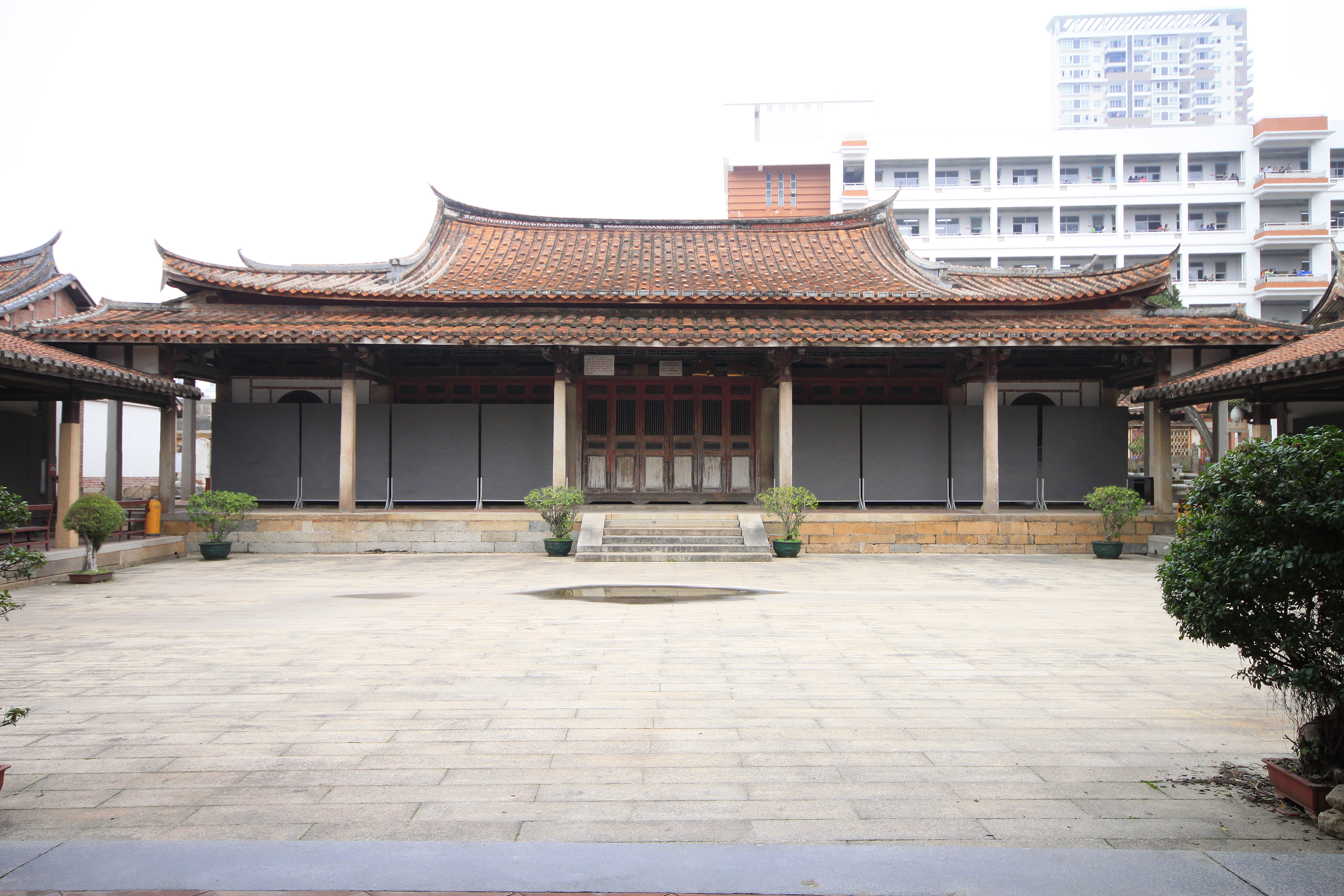
- The Shanmen at Yuanmiao Temple.

- Location within Fujian

Religion
- Affiliation: Taoism

Location
- Location: Chengxiang District, Putian, Fujian
- Country: China
- Interactive map of Yuanmiao Temple
- Coordinates: 25°26′17.03″N 119°00′48.51″E

Architecture
- Style: Chinese architecture
- Established: 628

Yuanmiao Temple (simplified Chinese: 元妙观; traditional Chinese: 元妙觀; pinyin: Yuánmiào Guàn) is a former Taoist temple located in Chengxiang District of Putian, Fujian, China.

== History ==
Xuanmiao Temple was originally built in 628, under the Tang dynasty (618–907). The name was changed into "Tianqing Temple" (天庆观) during the Song dynasty (960–1279), and then to the "Xuanmiao Temple" (玄妙观) in 1296 in the following Yuan dynasty (1271–1368). In 1662, Qing dynasty (1644–1911) Kangxi Emperor ascended the throne, due to the social taboo of "Xuan" ("Xuan" is the name of Kangxi Emperor), its name was changed into "Yuanmiao Temple" (元妙观).

In 1407, in the early Ming dynasty (1368–1644), Taoist priest Fang Rudiao (方汝调) and Bu Zhisheng (步志升) repaired the Hall of Jade Emperor. In 1564, Magistrate Yi Daotan (易道谭) restored the Shanmen. In 1582, Hall of Three Purities, Hall of Dongyue, Hall of Wenchang and Hall of Zhenwu were gradually renovated and refurbished by Lin Zhao'en (林兆恩).

Yuanmiao Temple underwent three renovations in the Qing dynasty (1644–1911), respectively in the ruling of Jiaqing Emperor (1797), in the reign of Xianfeng Emperor (1851–1861) and in the Gaungxu era (1875–1908).

During the Republic of China, the temple was used as barracks for the Nationalists.

After the establishment of the Communist State, the temple was used as campus for Putian No. 4 High School and Putian Normal College.

In October 1956, the Ministry of Culture appropriated a large sum of money for reconstructing the Hall of Three Purities.

In 1961, the Fujian Provincial Government inscribed it as a provincial level cultural heritage. Repairs were carried out in 1975 and again in 1986.

In 1996, it was listed among the fourth batch of "Major National Historical and Cultural Sites in Fujian" by the State Council of China.

== Architecture ==
Along the central axis of the temple stand five buildings including the Shanmen, Hall of Three Purities (三清殿), Hall of Jade Emperor (玉皇殿), Hall of Four Officials (九御四官殿) and Hall of Wenchang (文昌殿). Subsidiary structures were built on both sides of the central axis including the Hall of Five Emperors (五帝殿), Hall of Dongyue (东岳殿), Hall of Wuxian (五显殿), Hall of Xiyue (西岳殿), Hall of Lord Guan (关帝殿) and Hall of the God of Blessing (福神殿).

=== Hall of Three Purities ===
The Hall of Three Purities in the main hall in the temple with double-eaves gable and hip roofs. It is 7 rooms wide and 6 rooms deep and still maintains the architectural style of Song dynasty (960–1279).

== Gallery ==
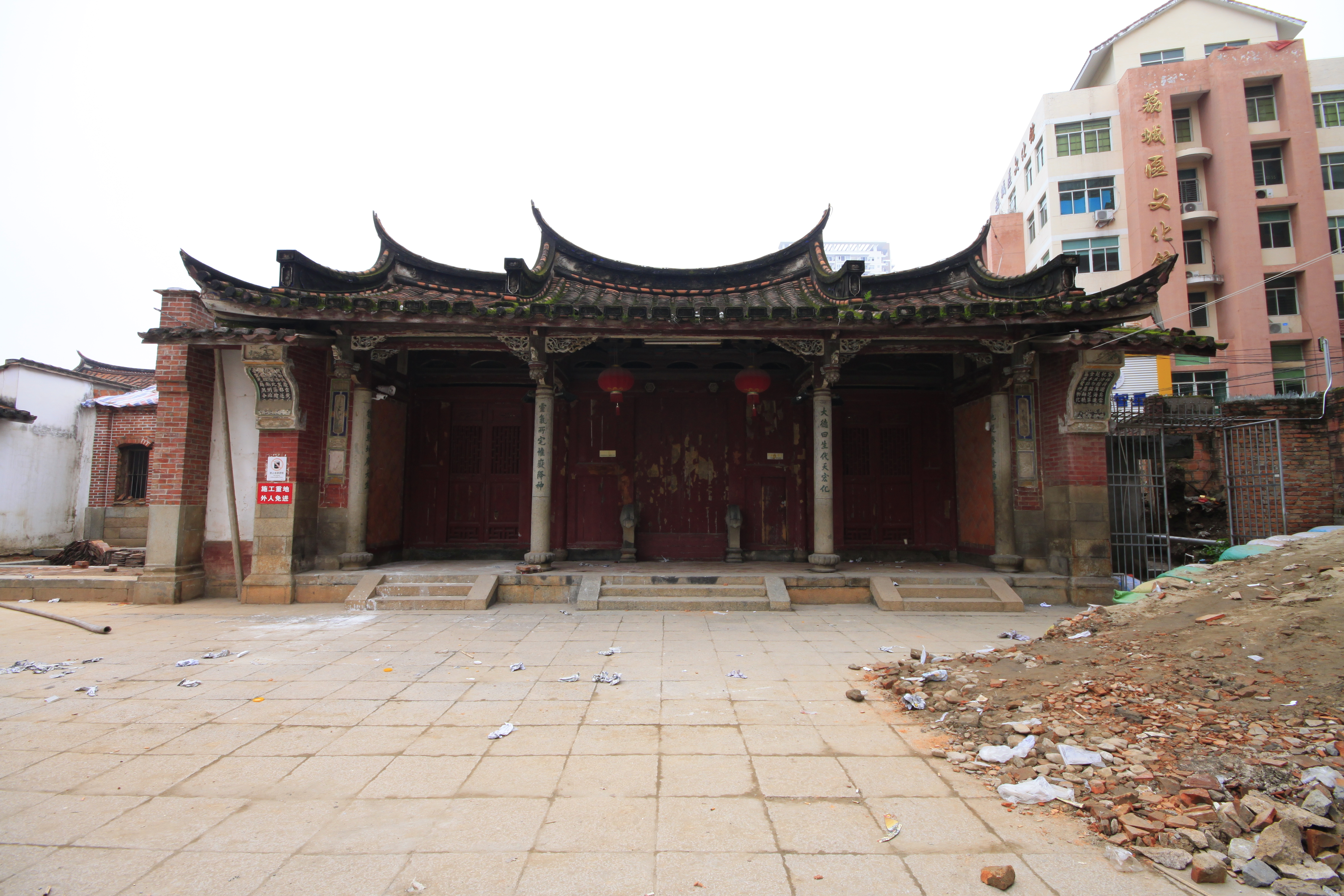
Frontal view of the Shanmen.

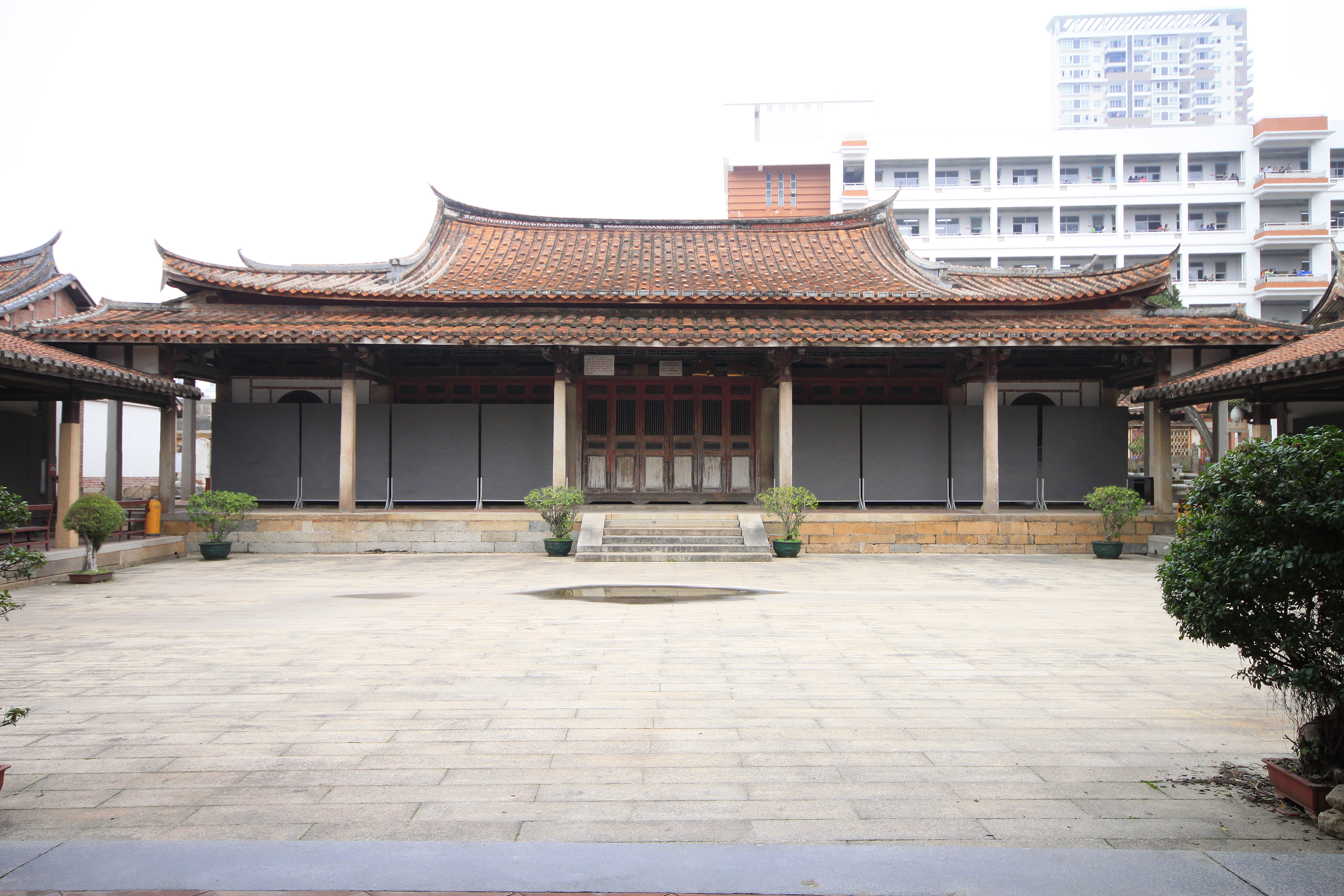
Hall of Three Purities.

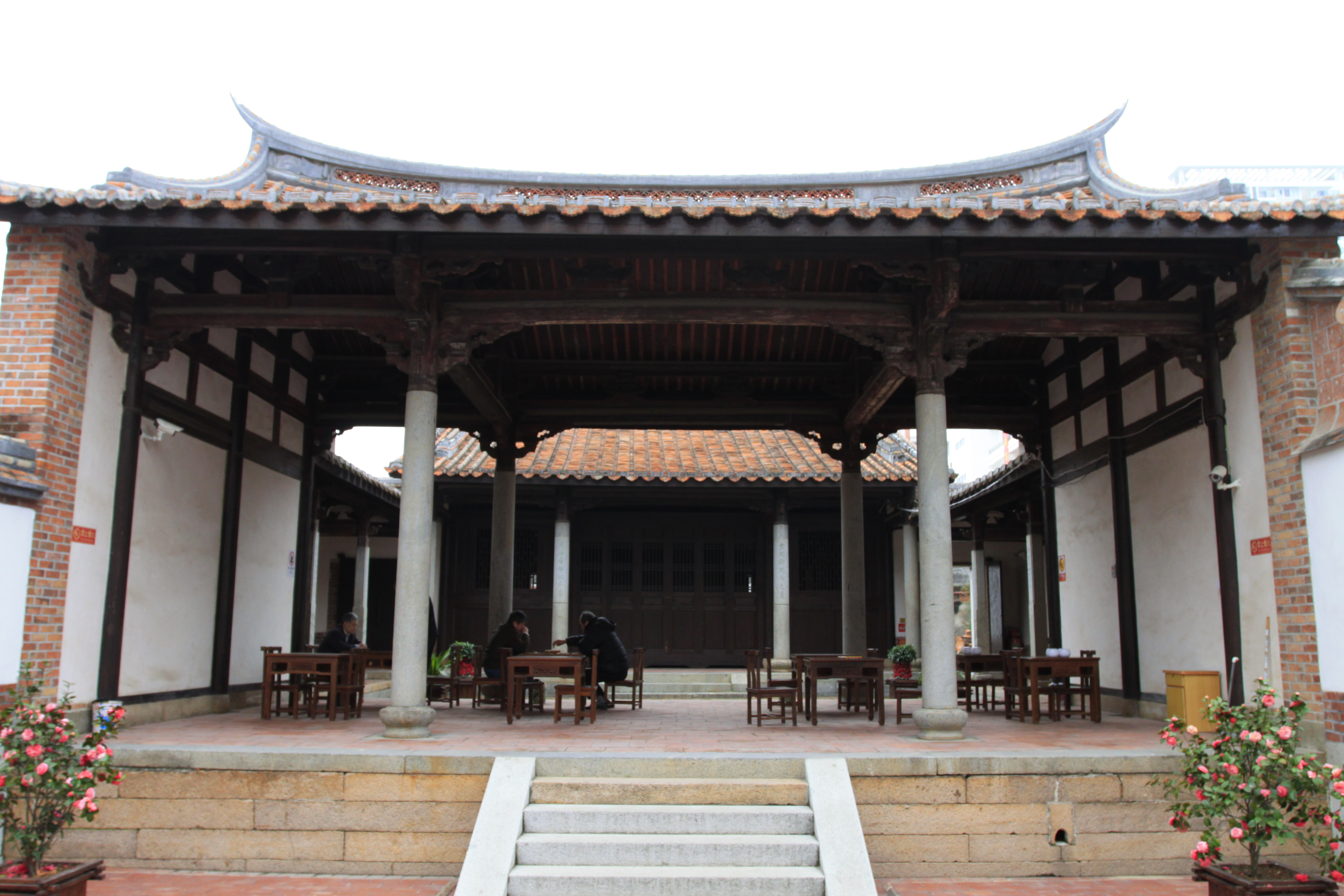
Weiqi club.

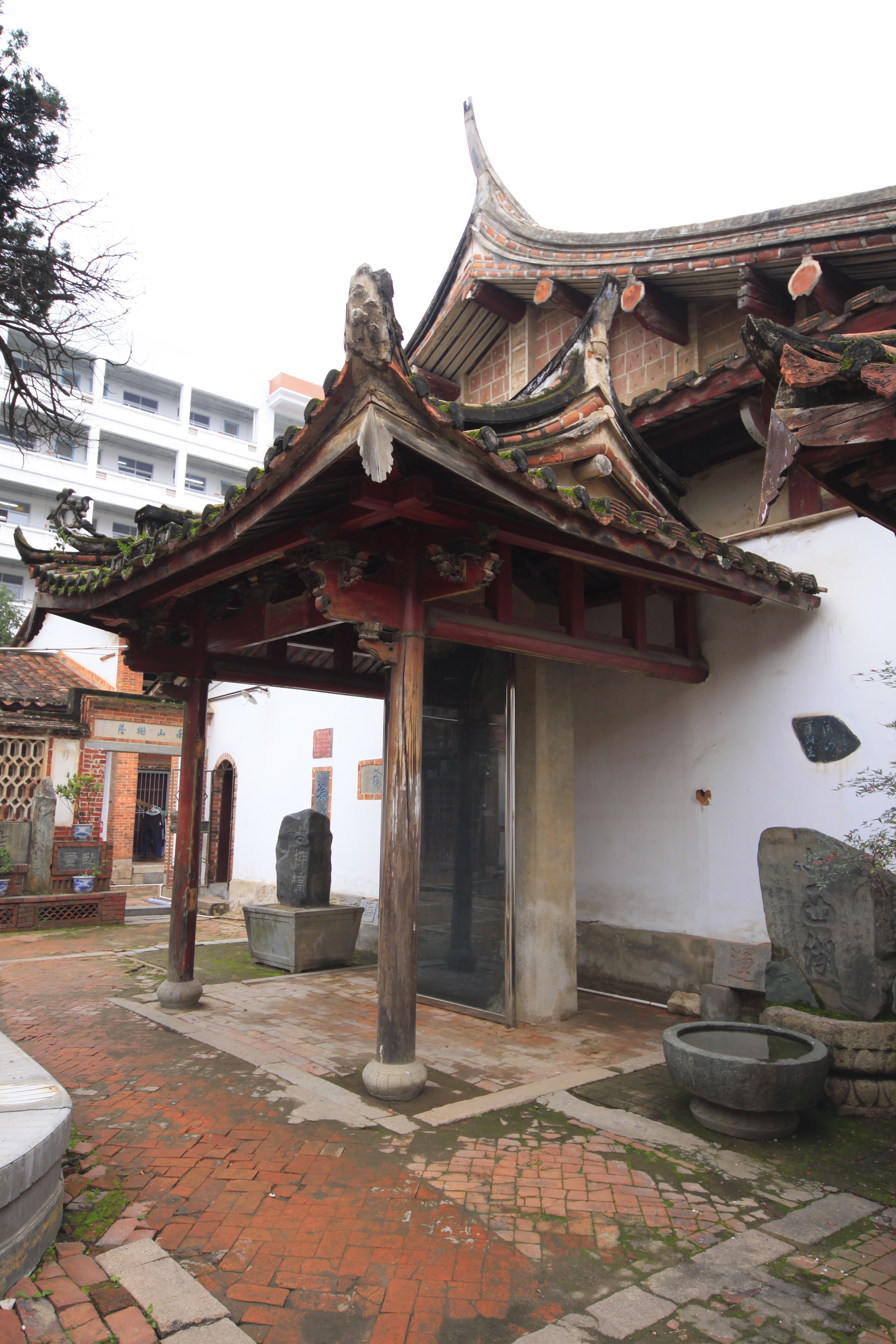
