= Operation Yellowstone =

Operation Yellowstone may refer to:

- Operation Yellowstone (Vietnam War) (1967–1968), a military engagement in the Vietnam War
- Operation Yellow Stone, a 2004 military operation during the Iraq War

== See also ==
- Yellowstone (disambiguation)
