= Ninghai (disambiguation) =

Ninghai or Ning Hai is a county in Ningbo Prefecture, Zhejiang Province, China.

It is also the atonal pinyin romanization of various Chinese names and words, particularly Nínghǎi (t 寜海, s 宁海) meaning "peaceful", "pacified", or "pacifying the sea(s)".

It may refer to:

- Ninghai, a medieval village on the shores of Houhai Lake now known as Qiaodou Village in Licheng District in Putian, Fujian, China
- Ninghai Bridge, an ancient stone bridge over a branch of the Mulan in Qiaodou
- Ninghai New Bridge across the Mulan in Putian
- Chinese cruiser Ning Hai, a light cruiser in the Chinese fleet
- Ning Hai-class cruisers, including the Ning Hai and its sister ship
- Muping District, which was formerly known as "Ninghai"
