= Chengxiang =

Chengxiang may refer to:

- Grand chancellor (China), the highest-ranking executive official in imperial Chinese governments
- Chengxiang District, a district in Putian, Fujian, China
