= Huangshi, Putian =

Huangshi 黄石镇
- Town
- Location in Fujian
- Coordinates: 25°22′39″N 119°4′24″E
- Country: People's Republic of China
- Province: Fujian
- Prefecture-level city: Putian

Area
  - Total: 61.5 km^{2} (23.7 sq mi)

Population (2010)
  - Total: 148,000
  - Density: 2,410/km^{2} (6,230/sq mi)
- Time zone: UTC+8 (China Standard)
- Website: http://www.ptlc.gov.cn/hsz/

Huangshi
- Traditional Chinese: 黃石
- Simplified Chinese: 黄石
- Literal meaning: Yellow Rock(s); Yellowstone(s)
Transcriptions
Standard Mandarin
- Hanyu Pinyin: Huángshí

Huangshi Town is a town in Putian's Licheng District on the central coast of Fujian Province, China. It had about 148,000 people during the 2010 census.

== Geography ==
Huangshi comprises the north-central part of Putian's Licheng District, southwest of Xinghua Bay on the Taiwan Strait. It covers 61.5 square kilometers (23.7 sq mi) of the extensively irrigated southern Putian Plain, an area known as the Nanyang (南洋).

== History ==
The territory of present-day Huangshi was largely reclaimed from tidal marshes through land reclamation efforts begun during the late Tang and continuing til the mid-Ming, a period stretching from the 9th to the 16th centuries. Huangshi proper was a market town by the time of the Ming.

== Administrative divisions ==
Huangshi is composed of the 2 neighborhoods of Huangshi (黄石居委会, Huángshí Jūwěihuì) and Changxi (常溪居委会, Chángxī Jūwěihuì) and the 36 villages of Shaban (沙坂村, Shābǎn Cūn), Shuinan (水南村, Shuǐnán Cūn), Dengyun (登云村, Dēngyún Cūn), Jinghou (井后村, Jǐnghòu Cūn), Heping (和平村, Hépíng Cūn), Hengtang (横塘村, Héngtáng Cūn), Qijing (七境村, Qījìng Cūn), Yaotai (瑶台村, Yáotái Cūn), Fengshan (凤山村, Fèngshān Cūn), Dingzhuang (定庄村, Dìngzhuāng Cūn), Shadi (沙堤村, Shādī Cūn), Tianma (天马村, Tiānmǎ Cūn), Huishang (惠上村, Huìshàng Cūn), Huixia (惠下村, Huìxià Cūn), Pingshan (屏山村, Píngshān Cūn), Dounan (斗南村, Dòunán Cūn), Dongshan (东山村, Dōngshān Cūn), Dongyang (东洋村, Dōngyáng Cūn), Dongdai (东埭村, Dōngdài Cūn), Jinshan (金山村, Jīnshān Cūn), Xucuo (徐厝村, Xúcuò Cūn), Dongjia (东甲村, Dōngjiǎ Cūn), Zhelang (遮浪村, Zhēlàng Cūn), Haibian (海边村, Hǎibiān Cūn), Jiangdong (江东村, Jiāngdōng Cūn), Huadong (华东村, Huádōng Cūn), Huazhong (华中村, Huázhōng Cūn), Huadi (华堤村, Huádī Cūn), Qiaodou (桥兜村, Qiáodōu Cūn), Xiadai (下埭村, Xiàdài Cūn), Xiajiangtou (下江头村, Xiàjiāngtóu Cūn), Xili (西利村, Xīlì Cūn), Xihong (西洪村, Xīhóng Cūn), Qingzhong (清中村, Qīngzhōng Cūn), Qinghou (清后村, Qīnghòu Cūn), and Qingqian (清前村, Qīngqián Cūn).

== Religion ==
The village of Qiaodou, known as Ninghai during the Song and Ming, is the site of the earliest-attested temple to the Chinese sea goddess Mazu, the deified form of the 10th-century shamaness Lin Moniang. Supposedly, Lin was born on nearby Meizhou Island, usually regarded as the cradle of her cult, but she probably spent her adult life on the mainland.

At present, Shuinan's Tianhou Palace (水南天后宫) is Huangshi's main temple. It was first constructed during the Hongwu Era of the Ming. It was rebuilt and adapted for use as Shuinan's guildhall (水南会馆) in 1795. The town holds religious processions every year on the 15th day of the first month of the Chinese lunar calendar and during the intercalary month of each year which has one. The main temple in the Qiaodou area is its Jiucha Temple (纠察庙) honoring the Great God of Jiucha (纠察大神). Its religious processions occur on the second and third days of the second lunar month.

== Transportation ==
The S201 highway connects central Huangshi to Hanjiang to the north and Xiuyu to the south. The G15 Expressway is nearby.
