= Putian University =

University in Putian, China

Coordinates: 25.034633°N 117.019522°E

- 莆田学院 (Chinese)
- Motto: 厚德·博学·慎思·笃行
- Type: Public university
- Established: 2002
- Location: Putian, Fujian, China
- Campus: Suburban
- Website: http://www.ptu.edu.cn/

Chinese name
- Simplified Chinese: 莆田学院
- Traditional Chinese: 莆田學院
Transcriptions
Standard Mandarin
- Hanyu Pinyin: Pútián Xué Yuán

Putian University (Chinese: 莆田学院) is a public university located in Putian, Fujian, China.
