= Kaiyuan Temple =

Kaiyuan Temple (simplified Chinese: 开元寺; traditional Chinese: 開元寺; pinyin: kāi yuán sì) could be several Buddhist temples:

- Kaiyuan Temple (Quanzhou), in Quanzhou, Fujian, China
- Kaiyuan Temple (Chaozhou), in Chaozhou, Guangdong, China
- Kaiyuan Temple (Taiwan), in Tainan, Taiwan
- A former name of the Shanhua Temple in Datong, Shanxi Province, China
- A former name of the Yuanmiao Temple in Huizhou, Guangdong, China

== See also ==
- Meiyuan Kaiyuan Temple Station, Wuxi, Jiangsu, China
