= Kaiyuan Subdistrict, Xiamen =

Subdistrict of Xiamen, Fujian, China

Coordinates: 24.4675°N 118.0954°E

Kaiyuan Subdistrict (simplified Chinese: 开元街道; traditional Chinese: 開元街道; pinyin: Kāiyuán Jiēdào; Pe̍h-ōe-jī: Khai-gôan-koe-tō) is a subdistrict of Siming District, Xiamen, Fujian Province, People's Republic of China. It covers an area of 5.7 square kilometres (2.2 sq mi) and has a registered population of 63,362.

It is located in central Xiamen Island, north of the original Siming District and south of Huli District. It is named after a street meaning "Initiating the First (Year)".

== History ==
In October 1945, Kaiyuan was created as a district (Kaiyuan District 開元區) along with Zhongxin District (中心區), Gulangyu District (鼓浪嶼區) and Heshan District (禾山區). In August 1966, it was renamed Dongfeng (lit. East Wind) District (东风), but this was reverted in October 1979. Finally, in April 2003, Kaiyuan and Gulangyu Districts were merged into Siming District.
