= Yellowstone (disambiguation) =

Yellowstone often refers to Yellowstone National Park in the United States.

Yellowstone may also refer to:

== Places ==
- Yellowstone, Alberta, a village
- Yellowstone, Indiana, an unincorporated community
- Yellowstone, Wisconsin, an unincorporated community
- Yellowstone County, Montana
- Yellowstone Caldera, volcanic caldera and supervolcano under Yellowstone National Park
- Yellowstone River

== Film and television ==
- Yellowstone (film), a 1936 film
- Yellowstone (British TV series), 2009 BBC documentary series about Yellowstone National Park
- Yellowstone (American TV series), a 2018 television drama

== Ships ==
- Yellowstone (steamboat), an 1831 side-wheeler packet boat
- USS Yellowstone (ID-2657), a cargo ship in commission from 1918 to 1919
- USS Yellowstone (AD-27), a destroyer tender in commission from 1946 to 1974
- USS Yellowstone (AD-41), a destroyer tender in commission from 1980 to 1996

== Other uses ==
- Yellowstone (supercomputer), at the NCAR-Wyoming Supercomputing Center
- Yellowstone Bourbon, an alcoholic beverage
- Boeing Yellowstone Project, a Boeing Company project to replace its entire civil aircraft portfolio with advanced technology aircraft
- 2-8-8-4 or Yellowstone, a locomotive type

== See also ==
- Huangshi (disambiguation)
- USS Yellowstone, a list of ships
- Guri i Kuq (translated as "yellow rock" from Albanian), a mountain in Kosovo
- Wong Shek (translated as "yellow stone" in Cantonese), a place in Hong Kong.
