= Xinghua Bay =

Inlet in Fujian, China

Coordinates: 25.37°N 119.36°E

- Traditional Chinese: 興化灣
- Simplified Chinese: 兴化湾
Transcriptions
Standard Mandarin
- Hanyu Pinyin: Xīnghuà Wān
- Wade–Giles: Hsing-hua Wan

Xinghua Bay is an inlet of the Taiwan Strait beside Putian in Fujian, China. It is fed by the Mulan River and Qiulu Creek (萩芦溪, Qiūlú Xī). Administratively, it is surrounded by Putian's Xiuyu, Licheng, and Hanjiang Districts to the south and west and by Fuzhou's city of Fuqing and the islands of its Pingtan County to the north and northeast.

== See also ==
- Xinghua Prefecture
