= Mulan River =

Coordinates: 25°23′20″N 119°08′20″E

Mulan

Location
- Country: China
- Region: Fujian Province

Physical characteristics
- Mouth
  - location: East China Sea
- Length: 168 km (104 mi)
- Basin size: 1,732 km^{2} (669 sq mi)

Basin features
- Tributaries
  - left: Xikou River, Dajixi River

Mulan River
- Traditional Chinese: 木蘭溪
- Simplified Chinese: 木兰溪
- Literal meaning: Magnolia Creek
Transcriptions
Standard Mandarin
- Hanyu Pinyin: Mùlán Xī
- Wade–Giles: Mu-lan Hsi

The Mulan River or Creek is a river in Fujian, China, which drains into Xinghua Bay on the Taiwan Strait between the East and South China Seas. It is the largest river in Central Fujian.
