= Yuanmiao Temple (Huizhou) =

Taoist temple in Huizhou, Guangdong, China

- 元妙观
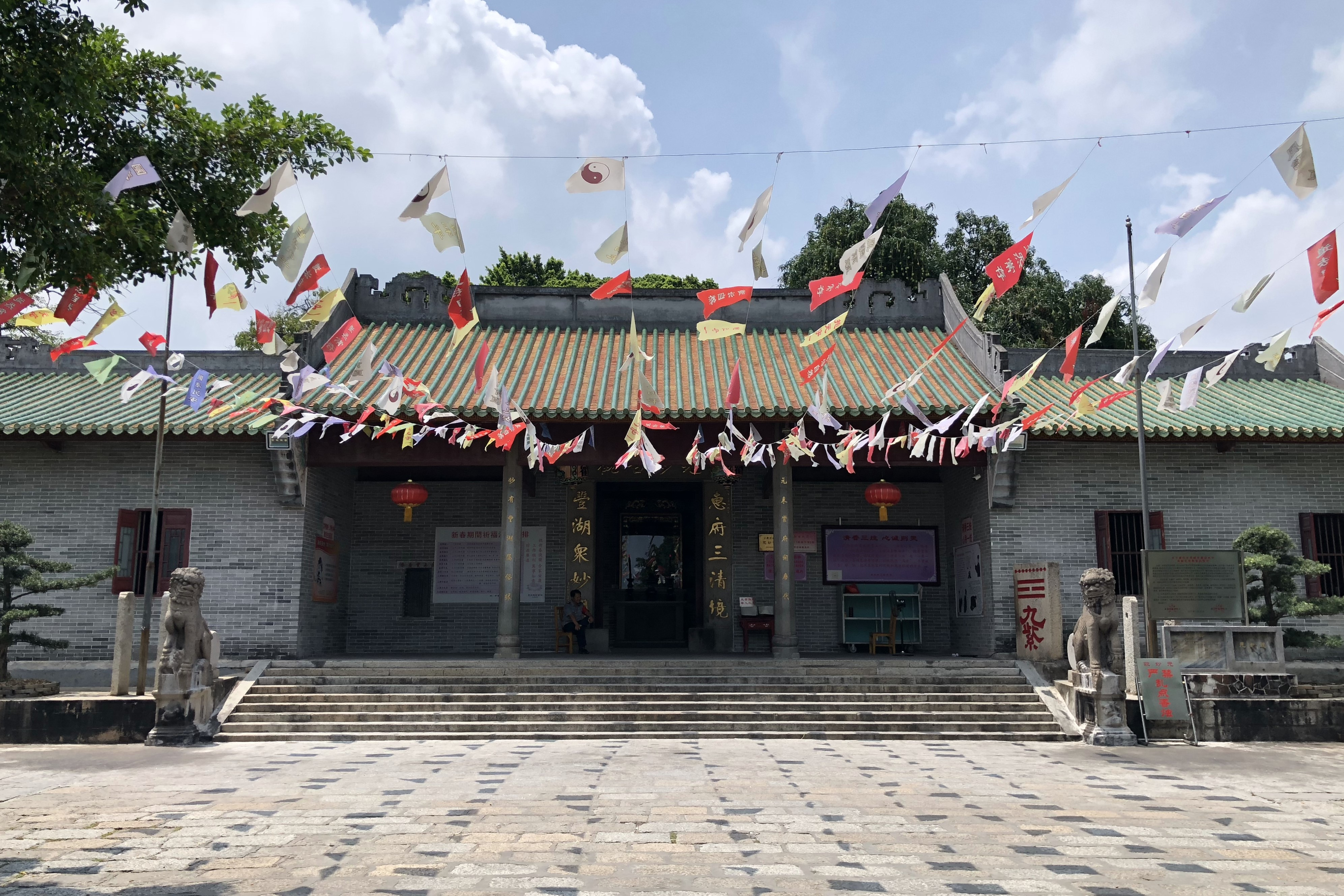
- Shanmen at Yuanmiao Temple.

- Location within Guangdong

Religion
- Affiliation: Taoism

Location
- Location: Huicheng District, Huizhou, Guangdong
- Country: China
- Interactive map of Yuanmiao Temple
- Coordinates: 23°06′16″N 114°24′19″E

Architecture
- Style: Chinese architecture
- Established: 633
- Completed: 1982 (reconstruction)

Yuanmiao Temple (simplified Chinese: 元妙观; traditional Chinese: 元妙觀; pinyin: Yuánmiào Guàn) is a Taoist temple located in Huicheng District of Huizhou, Guangdong, China. It is the site of Huizhou Taoist Association. It is hailed as one of "Three Largest Taoist Temples" alongside Sanyuan Palace and Chongxu Temple (冲虚观).

== History ==
Yuanmiao Temple was originally built in 633, under the Tang dynasty (618–907). It was renamed "Chaoyuan Temple" (朝元观) and later "Kaiyuan Temple" (开元观) after enlarging in 748.

The temple was restored in 1296 in the reign of Temür Khan in the Yuan dynasty (1271–1368).

The temple was destroyed and rebuilt many times in the following Ming (1368–1644) and Qing dynasties (1644–1911).

In 1942, the Hall of Three Purities, Hall of Jade Emperor and wing hall were completely destroyed during the Japanese invasion of the Second Sino-Japanese War.

In 1966, Mao Zedong launched the ten-year Cultural Revolution, the Red Guards had attacked the temple, almost all of the scriptures, historical documents, and other works of art were either removed, damaged or destroyed in the massive socialist movement.

After the 3rd Plenary Session of the 11th Central Committee of the Chinese Communist Party, a policy of some religious freedom was implemented. The temple was renovated and refurbished in 1982. That same year, it was officially reopened to the public.

Under the support of locals, the Hall of Jade Emperor and Hall of Three Purities were added to the temple in 1989.

Yuanmiao Temple was designated as a municipal-level cultural preservation unit in 1990.

== Architecture ==
Now the existing main buildings include the Hall of Jade Emperor, Hall of Three Purities, Hall of Guanyin, Hall of Lord Guan, Bell tower, Drum tower, and Hall of Bao Zheng.

== Gallery ==
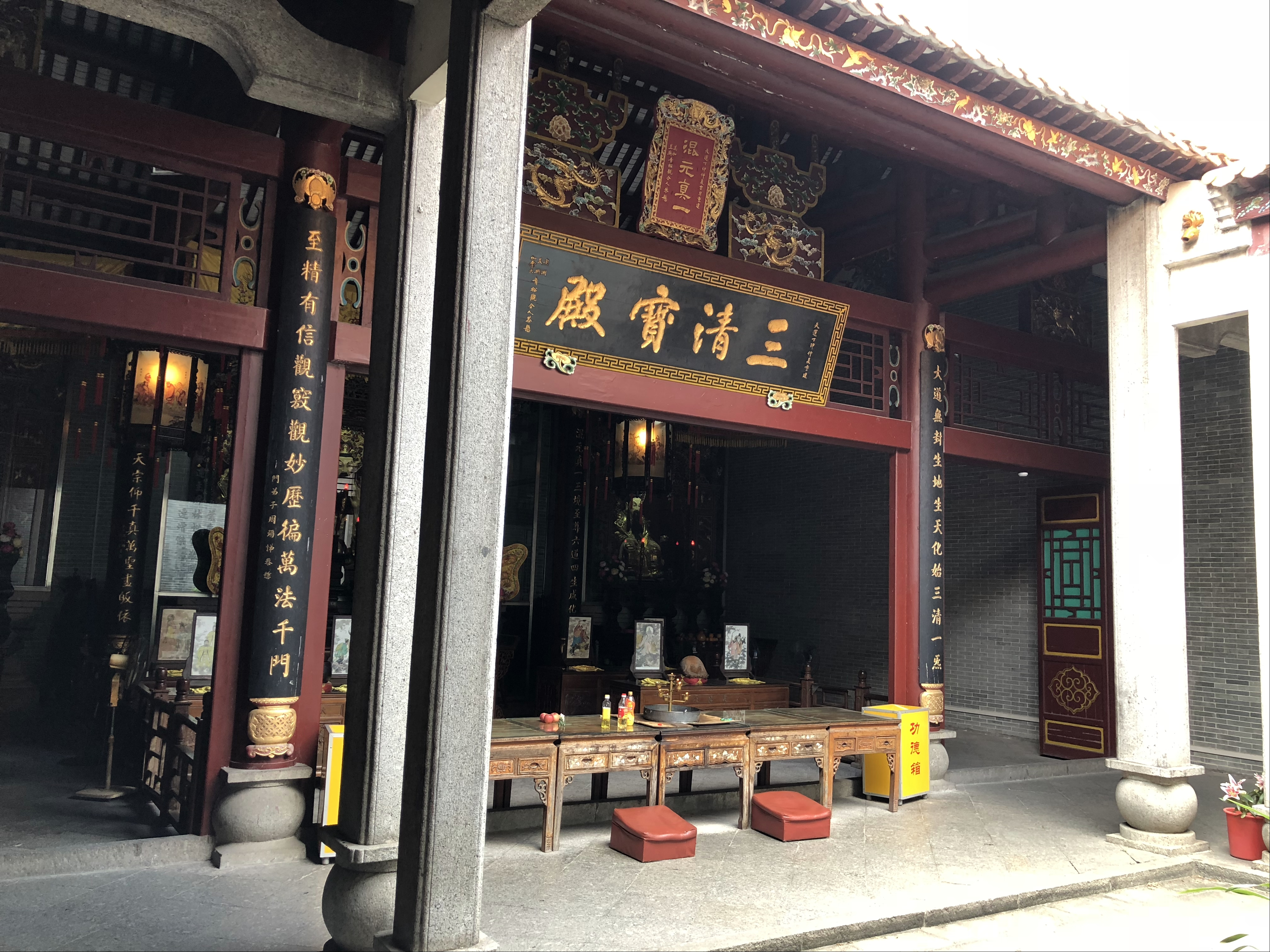
Hall of Three Purities (Sanqingdian).

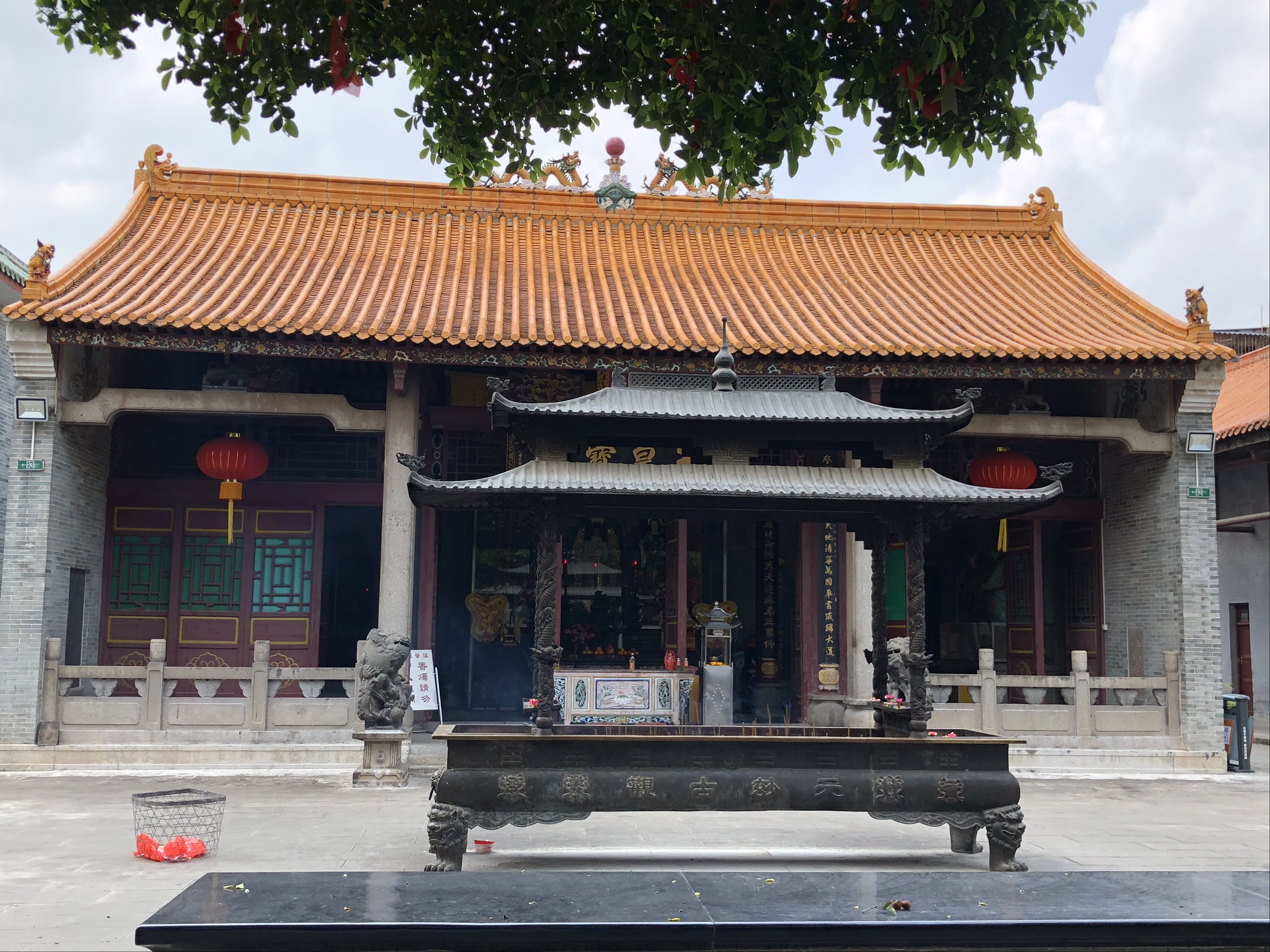
Hall of Jade Emperor.

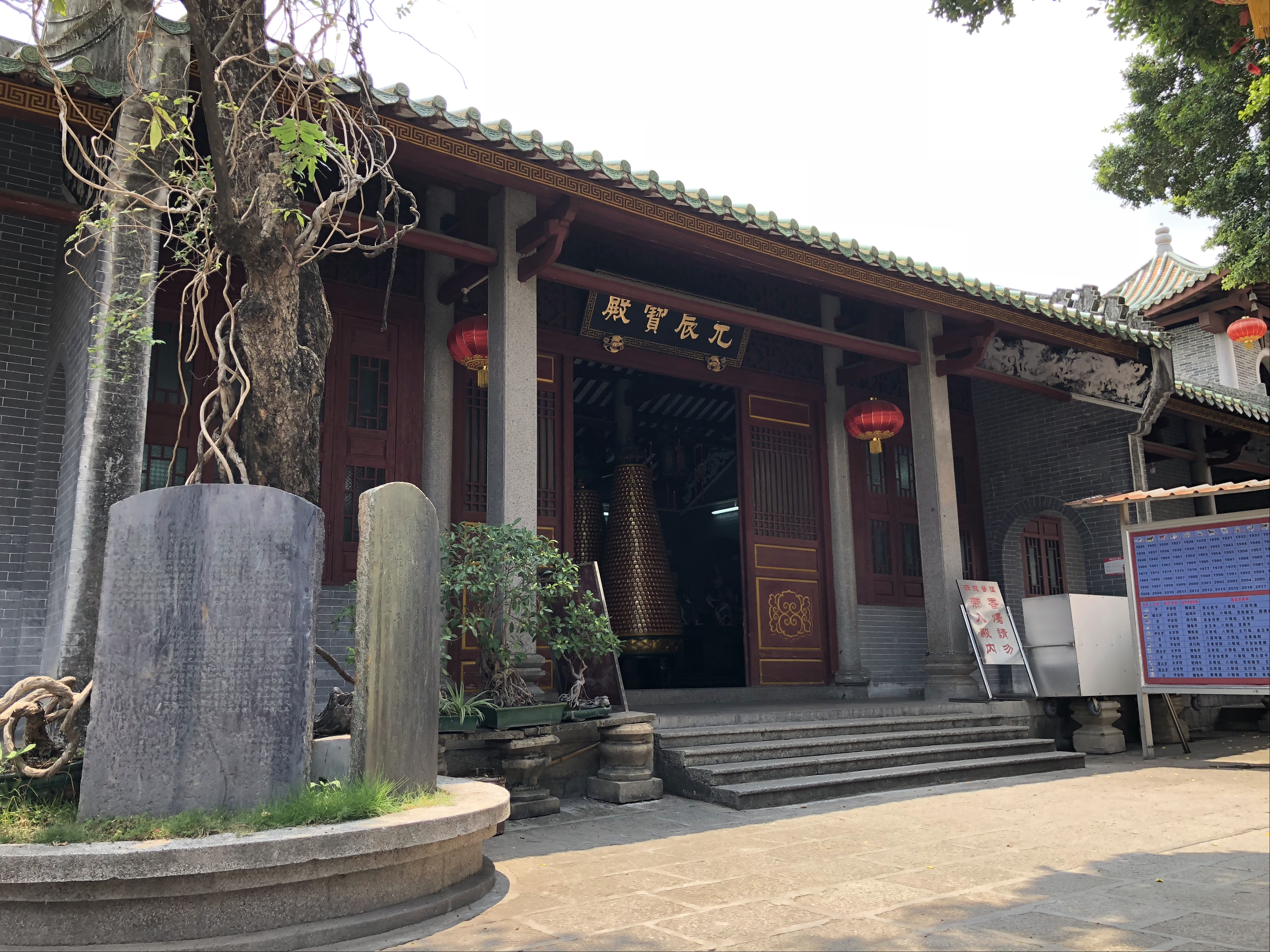
Hall of Yuanchen.

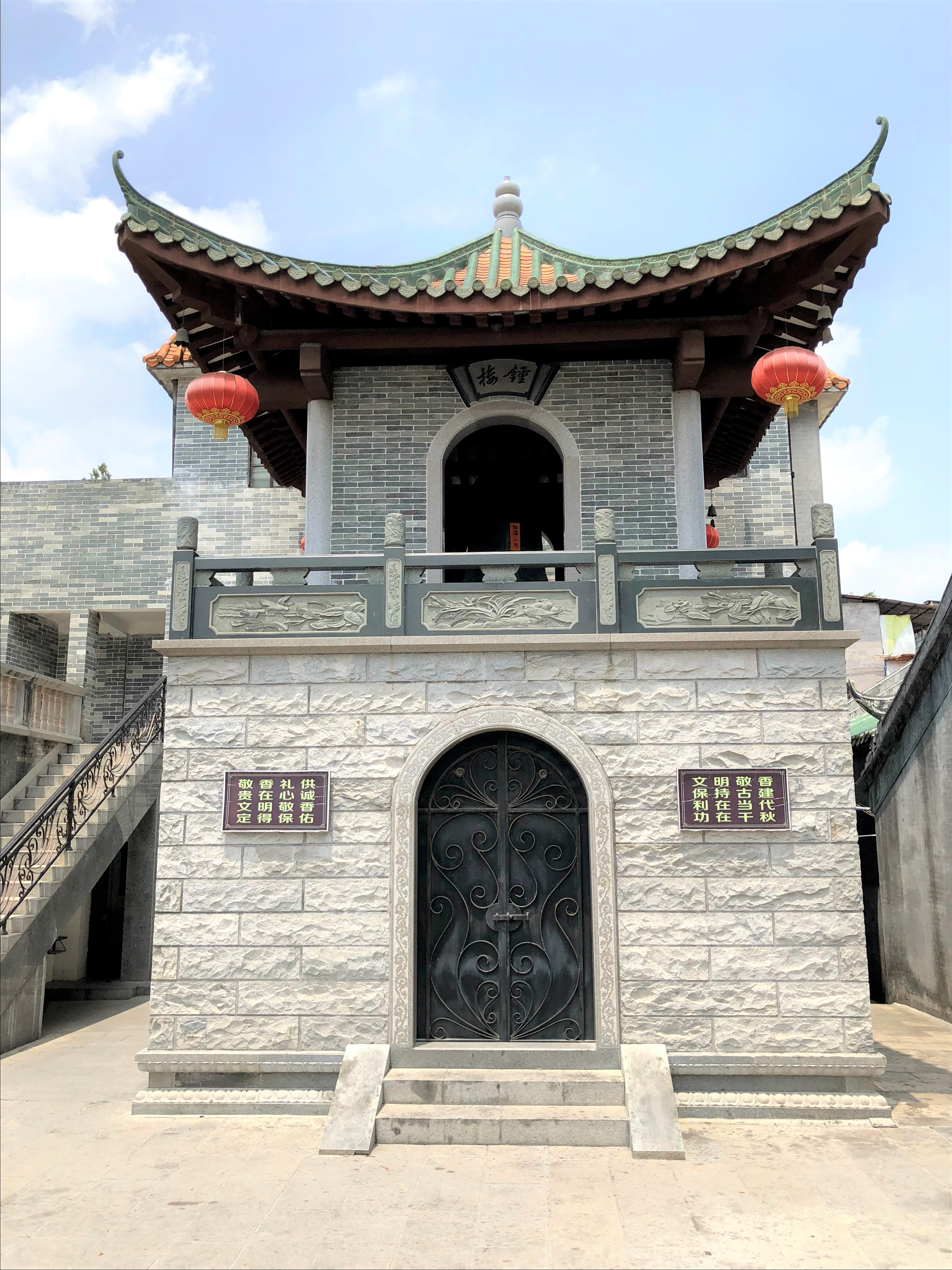
Bell tower.

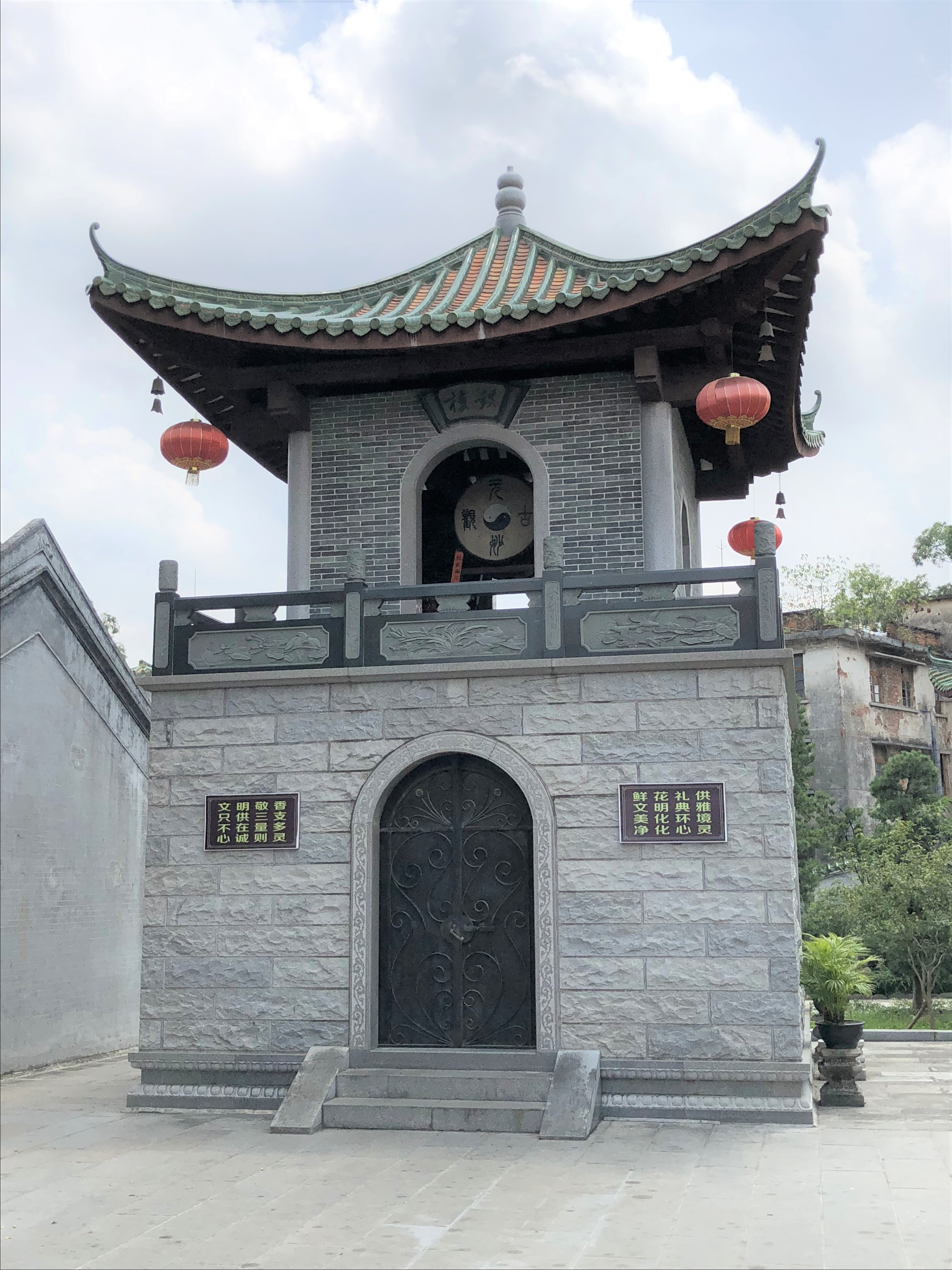
Drum tower.

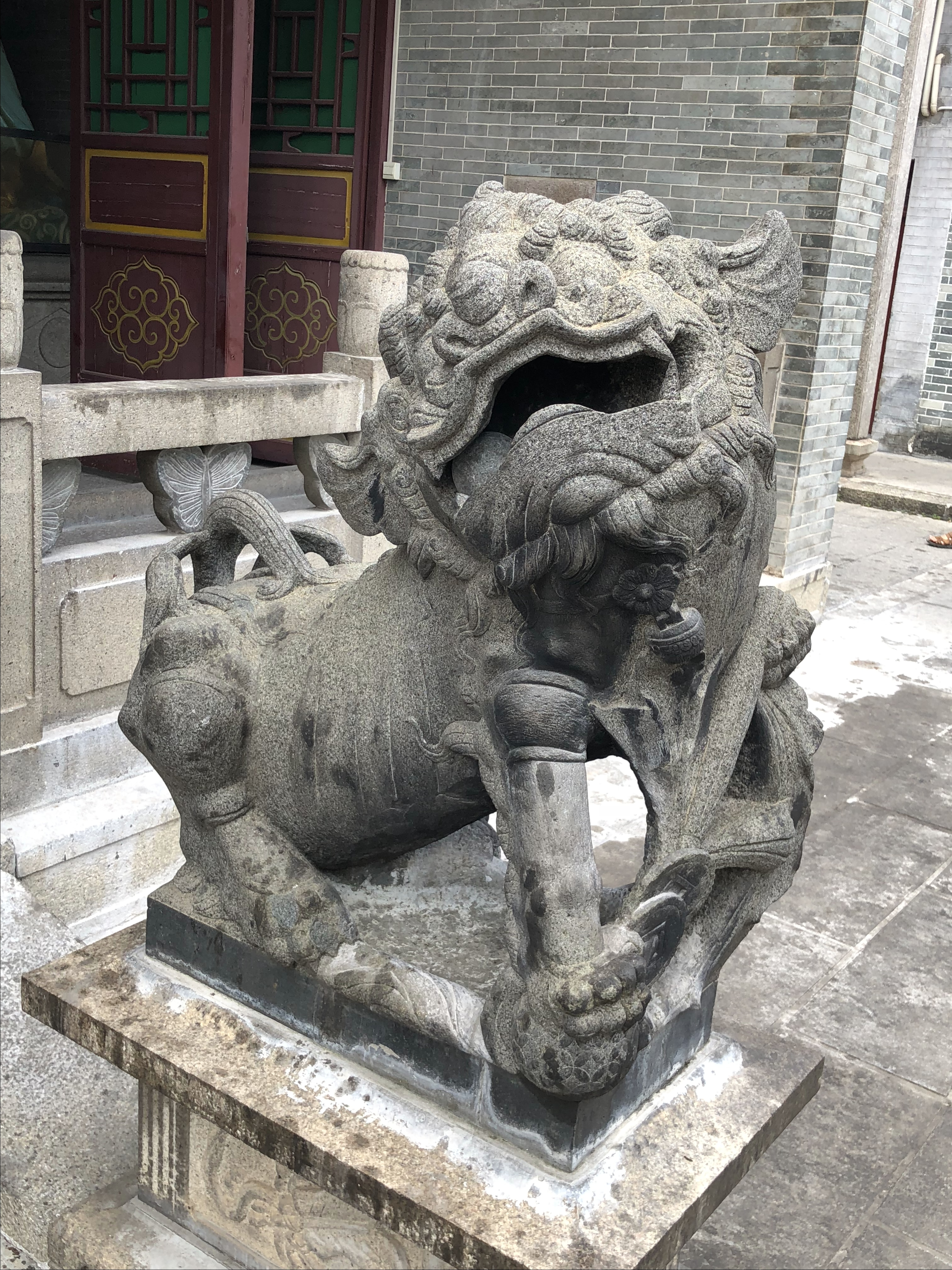
Chinese guardian lion.
