= Licheng, Putian =

Licheng 荔城区
- District
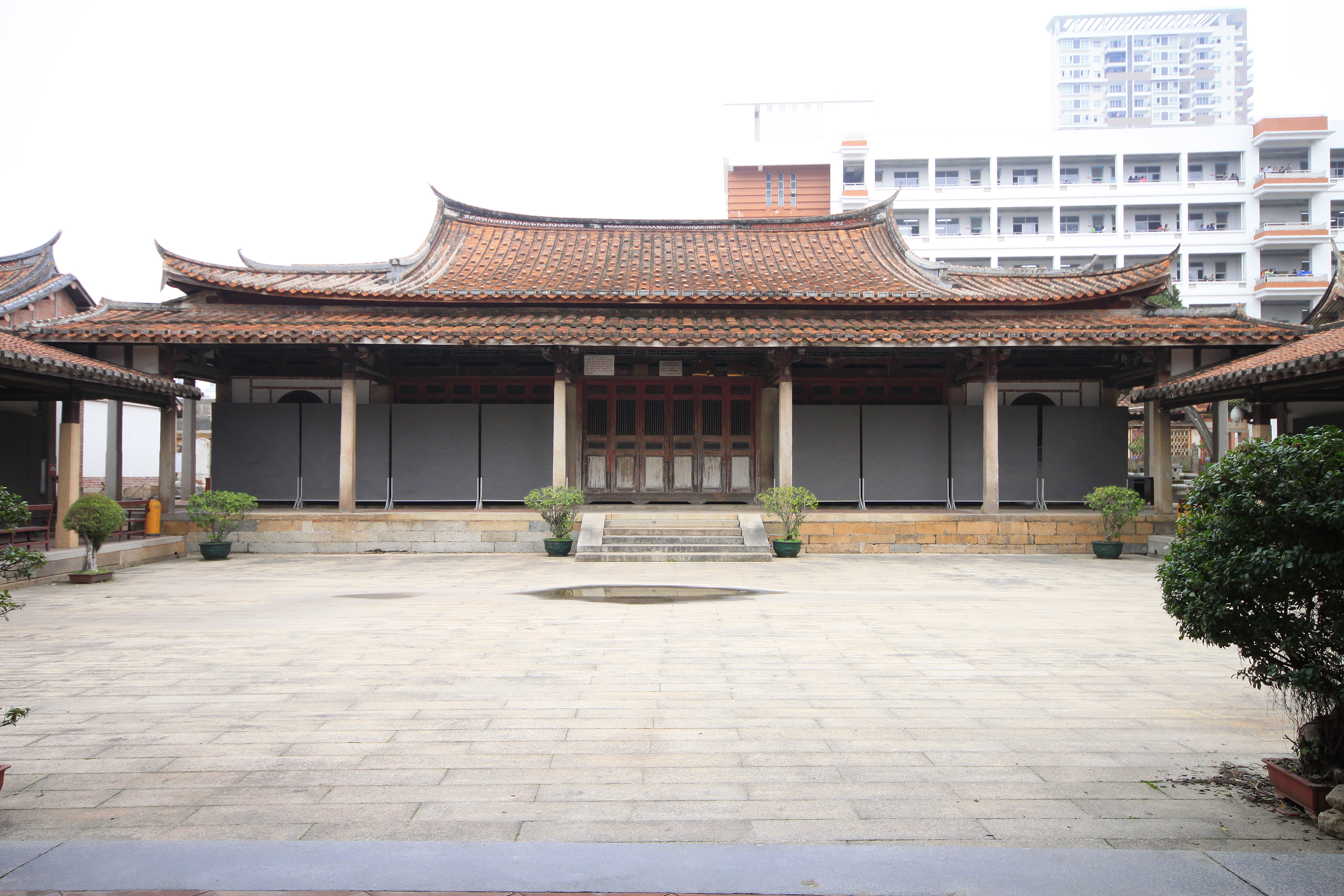

- Location in Fujian
- Coordinates: 25°25′54″N 119°00′57″E
- Country: People's Republic of China
- Province: Fujian
- Prefecture-level city: Putian

Government
  - Type: City district
  - Party Secretary: Liu Jitang
  - Mayor: Huang Canhuang (acting)

Area
  - Total: 279.0 km^{2} (107.7 sq mi)

Population (2020)
  - Total: 673,935
  - Density: 2,416/km^{2} (6,256/sq mi)
- Time zone: UTC+8 (China Standard)

Licheng
- Chinese: 荔城
- Literal meaning: Lychee City
Transcriptions
Standard Mandarin
- Hanyu Pinyin: Lìchéng

Licheng District is an urban district of Putian on the southeast coast of Fujian Province (Minnan), China.

== Geography ==
Licheng comprises the southern shore of Xinghua Bay on the Taiwan Strait and its hinterland. It forms the southeastern corner of Putian's prefecture, bordering Houhai Lake and Quanzhou, and covers most of the extensively irrigated southern Putian Plain, an area known as the Nanyang (南洋).

== Administrative divisions ==
Licheng is composed of the 2 subdistricts of Zhenhai (镇海街道, Zhènhǎi Jiēdào) and Gongchen (拱辰街道, Gǒngchén Jiēdào) and the 4 towns of West Tianwei (西天尾镇, Xītiānwěi Zhèn), Huangshi, Xindu (新度镇, Xīndù Zhèn), and Beigao.
