= Chengxiang, Putian =

Chengxiang 城厢区
- District
- Location in Fujian
- Coordinates: 25°25′10″N 118°59′38″E
- Country: People's Republic of China
- Province: Fujian
- Prefecture-level city: Putian

Area
  - Total: 483.7 km^{2} (186.8 sq mi)

Population (2020 census)
  - Total: 547,422
  - Density: 1,132/km^{2} (2,931/sq mi)
- Time zone: UTC+8 (China Standard)

Chengxiang (Chengxiang; simplified Chinese: 城厢区; traditional Chinese: 城廂區; pinyin: Chéngxiāng Qū) is a district of the city of Putian, Fujian province, People's Republic of China.

== Administrative divisions ==
Subdistricts:

- Xialin Subdistrict (霞林街道), Fenghuangshan Subdistrict (凤凰山街道), Longqiao Subdistrict (龙桥街道)

Towns:

- Changtai (常太镇), Huating (华亭镇), Lingchuan (灵川镇), Donghai (东海镇)
