= Putian =

Putian 莆田市
- Prefecture-level city
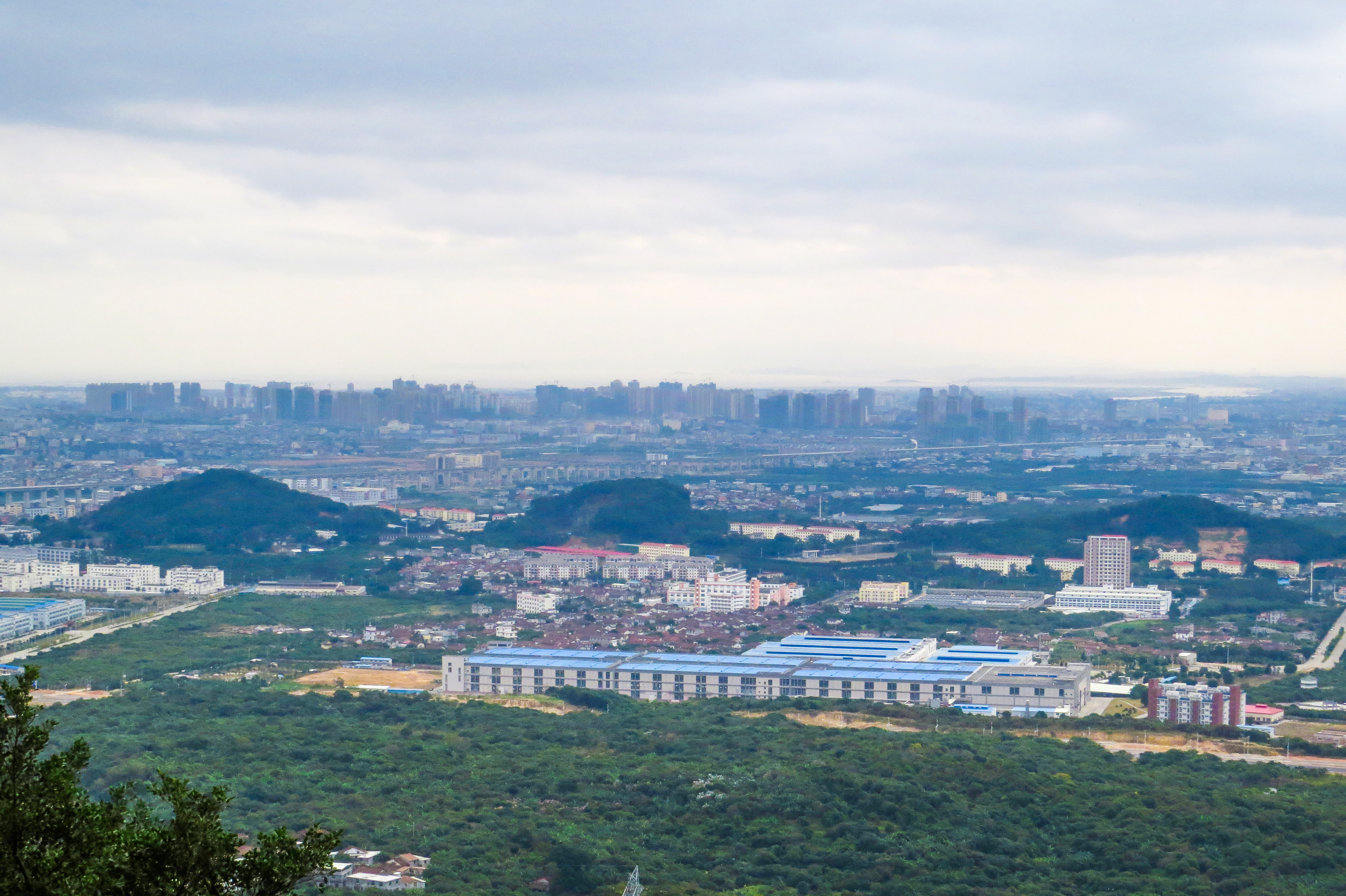
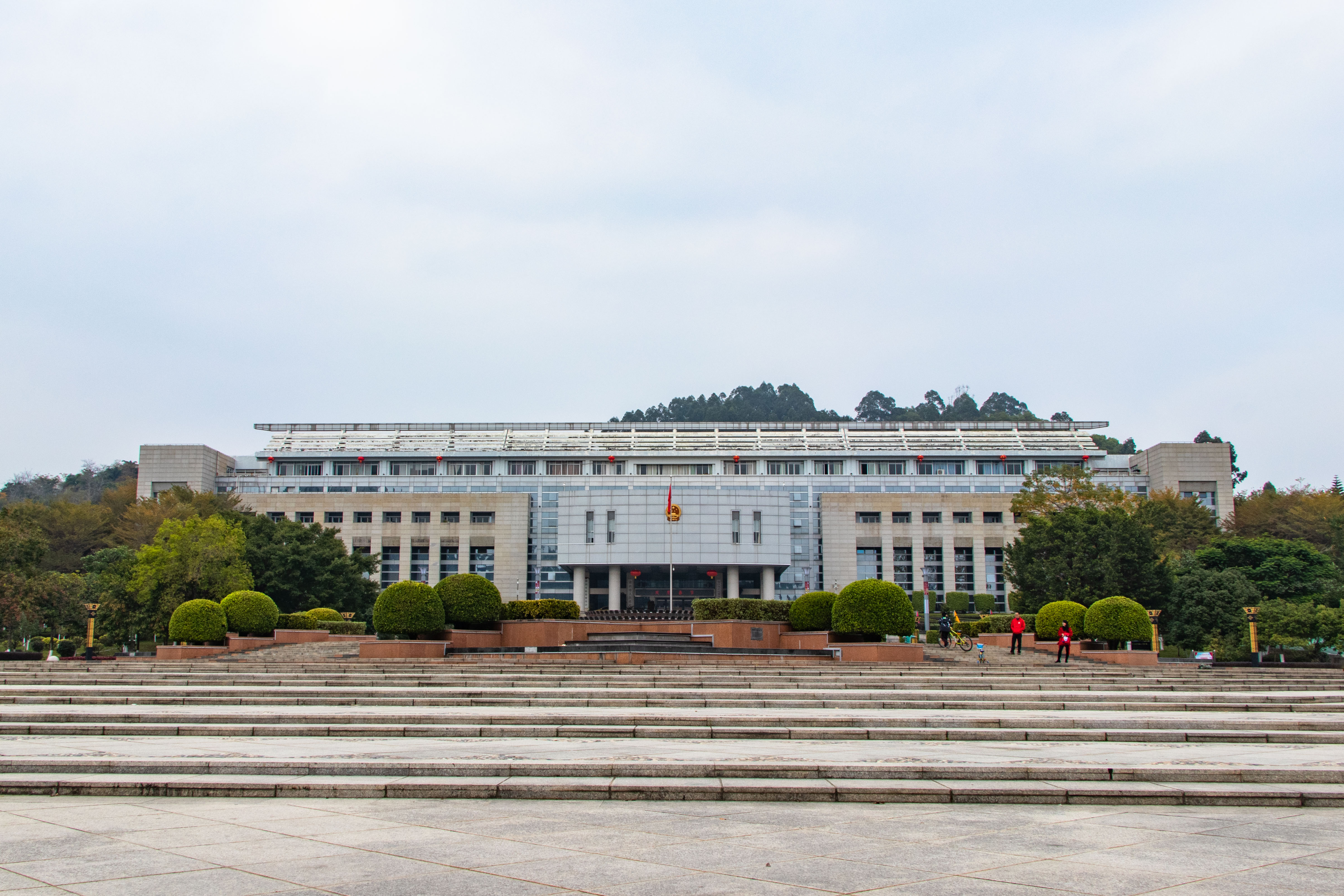
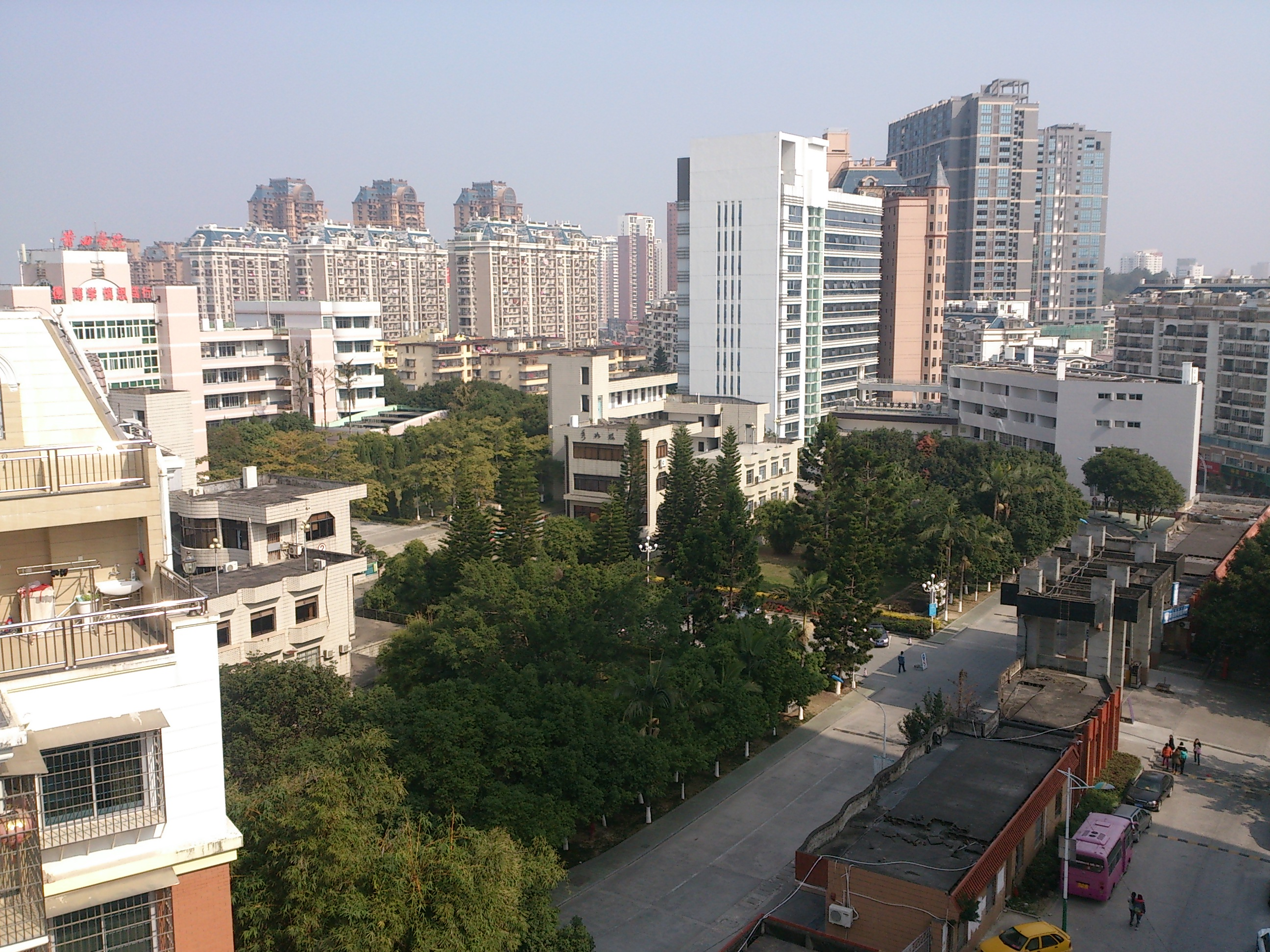
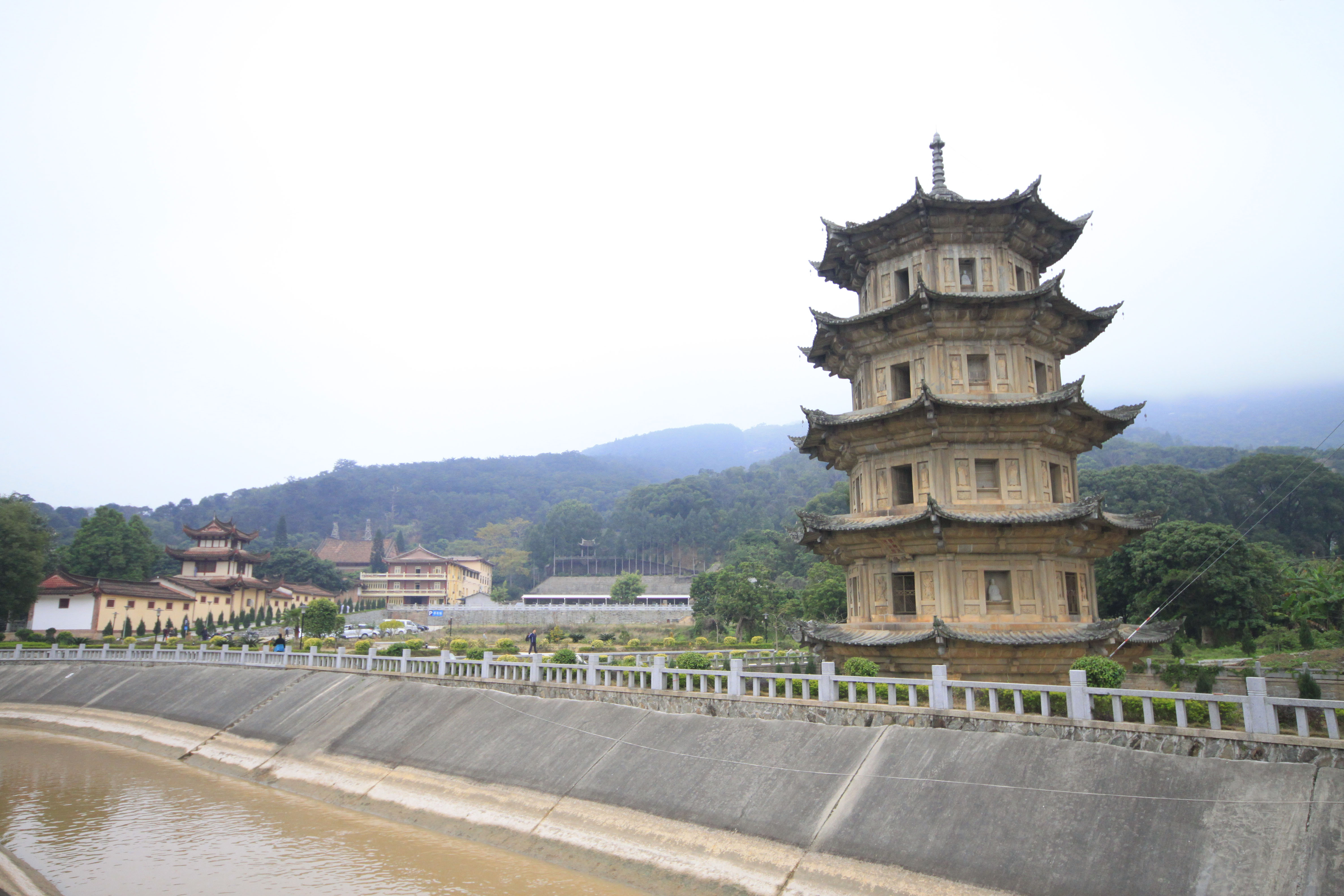
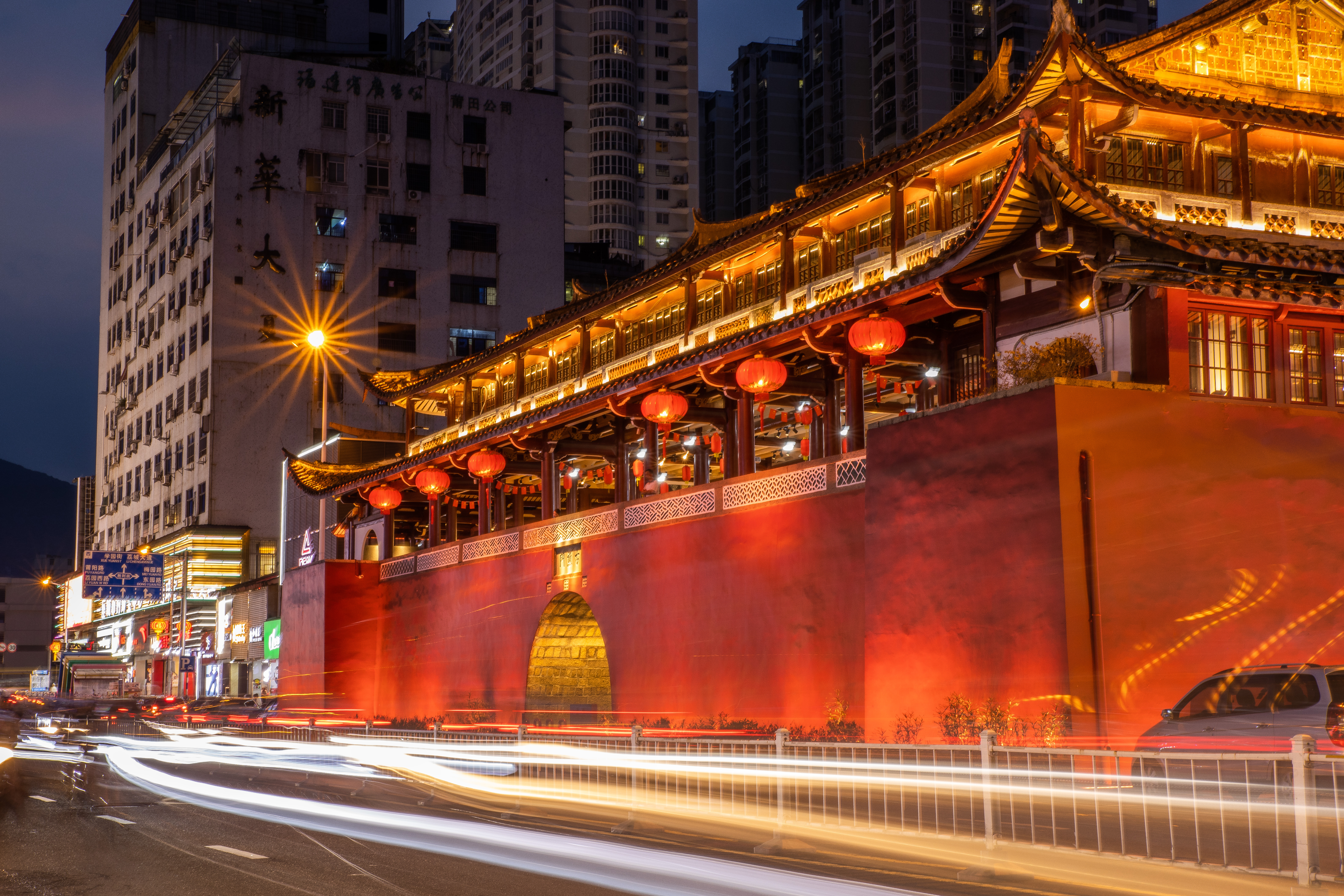
- Clockwise from top: Licheng District, Putian University, Guqiaolou Temple, Guanghua Temple in Chengxiang District, the Municipal Government building of Putian.

- Location of Putian in Fujian

- Location within Fujian Location within China
- Coordinates (Putian Government Plaza): 25°27′09″N 119°00′28″E
- Country: China
- Province: Fujian
- Municipal seat: Chengxiang District

Government
  - CPC Secretary: Fu Chaoyang
  - Mayor: Lin Xuyang

Area
  - Prefecture-level city: 4,119 km^{2} (1,590 sq mi)
  - Urban: 2,284 km^{2} (882 sq mi)
  - Metro: 2,284 km^{2} (882 sq mi)

Population (2020 census)
  - Prefecture-level city: 3,210,714
  - Density: 779.5/km^{2} (2,019/sq mi)
  - Urban: 2,305,646
  - Urban density: 1,009/km^{2} (2,615/sq mi)
  - Metro: 2,305,646
  - Metro density: 1,009/km^{2} (2,615/sq mi)

GDP
  - Prefecture-level city: CN¥ 277 billion US$ 38.3 billion
  - Per capita: CN¥ 94,109; US$ 12,995
- Time zone: UTC+8 (Time in China)
- Postal code: 351100, 351200
- Area code: 594
- License Plate Prefixes: 闽B
- Local variety: Puxian Min
- Website: www.putian.gov.cn

Putian
- Simplified Chinese: 莆田
- Postal: Putian
Transcriptions
Standard Mandarin
- Hanyu Pinyin: Pútián
- Wade–Giles: P'u^{2}-t'ien^{2}
Hakka
- Romanization: Phû-thièn
Southern Min
- Hokkien POJ: Phô͘-chhân
Eastern Min
- Fuzhou BUC: Può-dièng
Pu-Xian Min
- Hinghwa BUC: Pó-chéng

Putian (Chinese: 莆田, Putian dialect: Pó-chéng), also known as Puyang (莆阳) and Puxian (莆仙), historically known as Hinghwa, Hinghua, or Henghua (simplified Chinese: 兴化; traditional Chinese: 興化), is a prefecture-level city in Fujian Province, People's Republic of China. It borders Fuzhou to the north, Quanzhou to the south, and the Taiwan Strait's Xinghua Bay to the east. Mulan River flows through the city.

== History ==
Putian was first founded as an administrative area in the year of 568 as a city county during the Chen dynasty. Putian was later established as a military administered city in 979.

Putian is known as the counterfeit sneaker capital with counterfeiters protected from internationally intellectual property law enforcement by the notoriously corrupt local courts.

== Language ==
Pó-chéng-uā (莆田话), a sub-dialect of Min Chinese is spoken.

== Economy ==
Putian has become an export base for Fujian products. The main industries are shoe-making, brewing, electronics, garments, fruits, vegetables, machinery and electrical goods. In particular, the area is known for high-quality counterfeits of shoes and the domination of Chinese private healthcare under the so-called "Putian system", where approximately 80% of private Chinese hospitals during the mid-2010s were owned by people connected to Putian, which was brought to Chinese public attention by the death of the cancer patient Wei Zexi in 2016 due to an unproven treatment used at a private hospital connected to the system.

== Culture ==
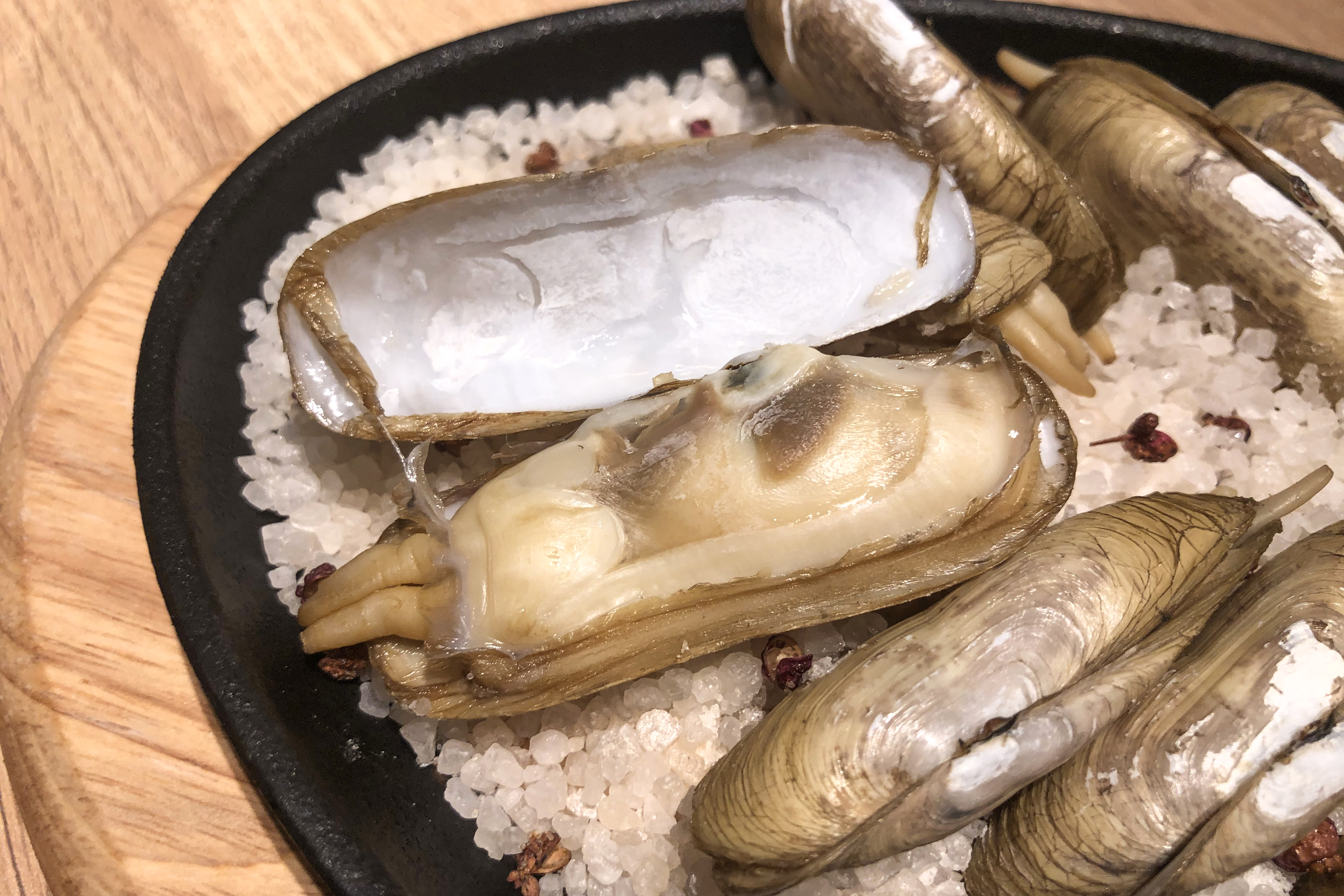
Salt-baked duotou clams

Putian is known for Putian (Henghwa) cuisine, a unique style of cuisine that places a heavy emphasis on fresh seafood. Duotou clams (哆头蛏, Sinonovacula constricta), locally harvested around the village of Duotou (哆头), are particularly well known.

== Tourism ==
Meizhou Island, most famous for being the legendary birthplace of the goddess Mazu, is located closely offshore of Putian. According to legends, Mazu in her earthly incarnation died on the seashore of Xianliang Harbor, in the coastal area of Putian, where Xianliang Mazu Temple hosts pilgrims from different Chinese provinces and from Taiwan, particularly for the ceremonies commemorating the goddess' death held in October. Because of its hosting "the most sacred places for Mazu believers," Putian is known as "Mazu's hometown."

== Higher education ==
- Putian University
- Meizhouwan Vocational Technology College

== Climate ==
On September 4 2026 the city was struck by severe flooding caused by the landfall of Typhoon Saudel causing widespread damage.

Climate data for Putian, elevation 81 m (266 ft), (1991–2020 normals, extremes 1981–present)
Month	Jan	Feb	Mar	Apr	May	Jun	Jul	Aug	Sep	Oct	Nov	Dec	Year
Record high °C (°F)	27.0 (80.6)	31.1 (88.0)	31.0 (87.8)	32.0 (89.6)	36.0 (96.8)	35.6 (96.1)	38.9 (102.0)	36.7 (98.1)	36.4 (97.5)	34.7 (94.5)	31.1 (88.0)	28.4 (83.1)	38.9 (102.0)
Mean daily maximum °C (°F)	16.4 (61.5)	16.9 (62.4)	19.3 (66.7)	23.7 (74.7)	27.2 (81.0)	30.3 (86.5)	33.1 (91.6)	32.7 (90.9)	30.8 (87.4)	27.0 (80.6)	23.3 (73.9)	18.7 (65.7)	25.0 (76.9)
Daily mean °C (°F)	12.6 (54.7)	12.9 (55.2)	15.1 (59.2)	19.5 (67.1)	23.5 (74.3)	26.7 (80.1)	29.0 (84.2)	28.7 (83.7)	27.1 (80.8)	23.4 (74.1)	19.7 (67.5)	15.0 (59.0)	21.1 (70.0)
Mean daily minimum °C (°F)	10.1 (50.2)	10.4 (50.7)	12.4 (54.3)	16.6 (61.9)	20.7 (69.3)	24.1 (75.4)	26.0 (78.8)	25.8 (78.4)	24.5 (76.1)	21.0 (69.8)	17.3 (63.1)	12.5 (54.5)	18.5 (65.2)
Record low °C (°F)	1.5 (34.7)	4.1 (39.4)	2.8 (37.0)	9.1 (48.4)	15.0 (59.0)	16.2 (61.2)	22.0 (71.6)	21.5 (70.7)	19.8 (67.6)	13.2 (55.8)	6.3 (43.3)	1.8 (35.2)	1.5 (34.7)
Average precipitation mm (inches)	47.1 (1.85)	73.2 (2.88)	116.3 (4.58)	123.9 (4.88)	199.6 (7.86)	274.0 (10.79)	183.1 (7.21)	251.3 (9.89)	145.8 (5.74)	57.3 (2.26)	42.7 (1.68)	37.3 (1.47)	1,551.6 (61.09)
Average precipitation days (≥ 0.1 mm)	8.0	10.6	15.1	14.3	15.8	15.6	9.9	13.3	8.8	4.9	5.8	6.9	129
Average snowy days	0.1	0	0	0	0	0	0	0	0	0	0	0	0.1
Average relative humidity (%)	71	74	76	76	79	82	77	77	71	65	67	66	73
Mean monthly sunshine hours	121.5	101.9	116.4	130.9	137.1	153.7	243.2	213.7	182.5	179.2	140.8	135.8	1,856.7
Percentage possible sunshine	37	32	31	34	33	37	58	53	50	51	43	42	42
Source: China Meteorological Administration all-time extreme temperature all-time May high all-time Oct high

all-time Oct high

== Administration ==
Putian's municipal executive, legislature and judiciary are in Chengxiang District (城厢区). The municipal region comprises three other districts and one county:

- Hanjiang District (涵江区)
- Licheng District (荔城区)
- Xiuyu District (秀屿区)
- Xianyou County (仙游县)

Map
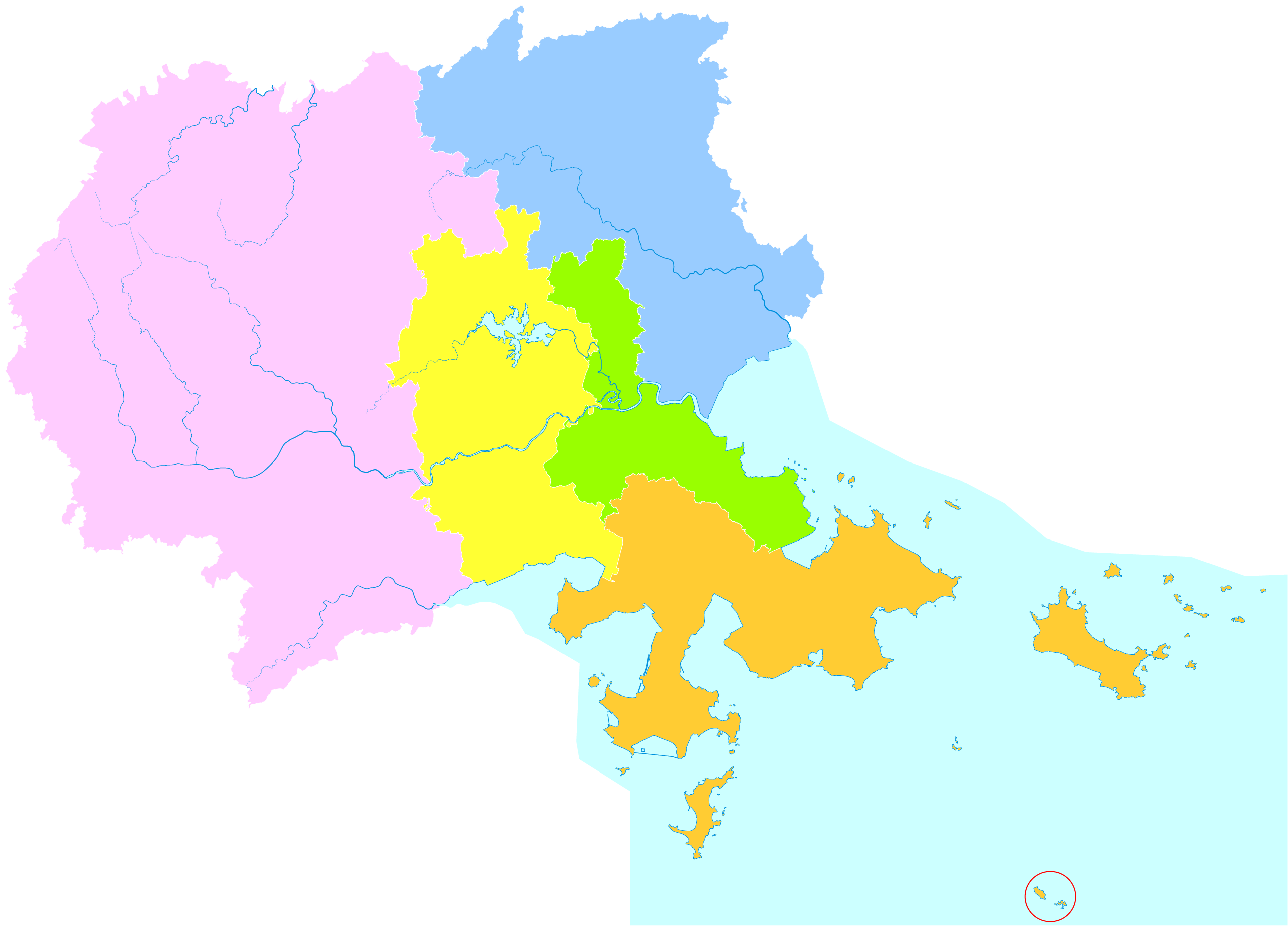
